= Echo Peak (disambiguation) =

Echo Peak may refer to:

- Echo Peak, a mountain peak in California
- Echo Peak (Wyoming), a mountain peak in Yellowstone National Park, Wyoming
- Echo Peak (Arizona), a mountain peak in Arizona
- Echo Peak (Mariposa County, California), a mountain peak in California
- Echo Peak (Idaho), a mountain peak in Idaho
- Echo Peak (Montana), a mountain peak in Montana
- Echo Peak (South Dakota), a mountain peak in South Dakota
- Echo Peak (Washington), a mountain peak in Washington state

== See also ==
- Echo Mountain (disambiguation)
