= List of mountains and mountain ranges of Yellowstone National Park =

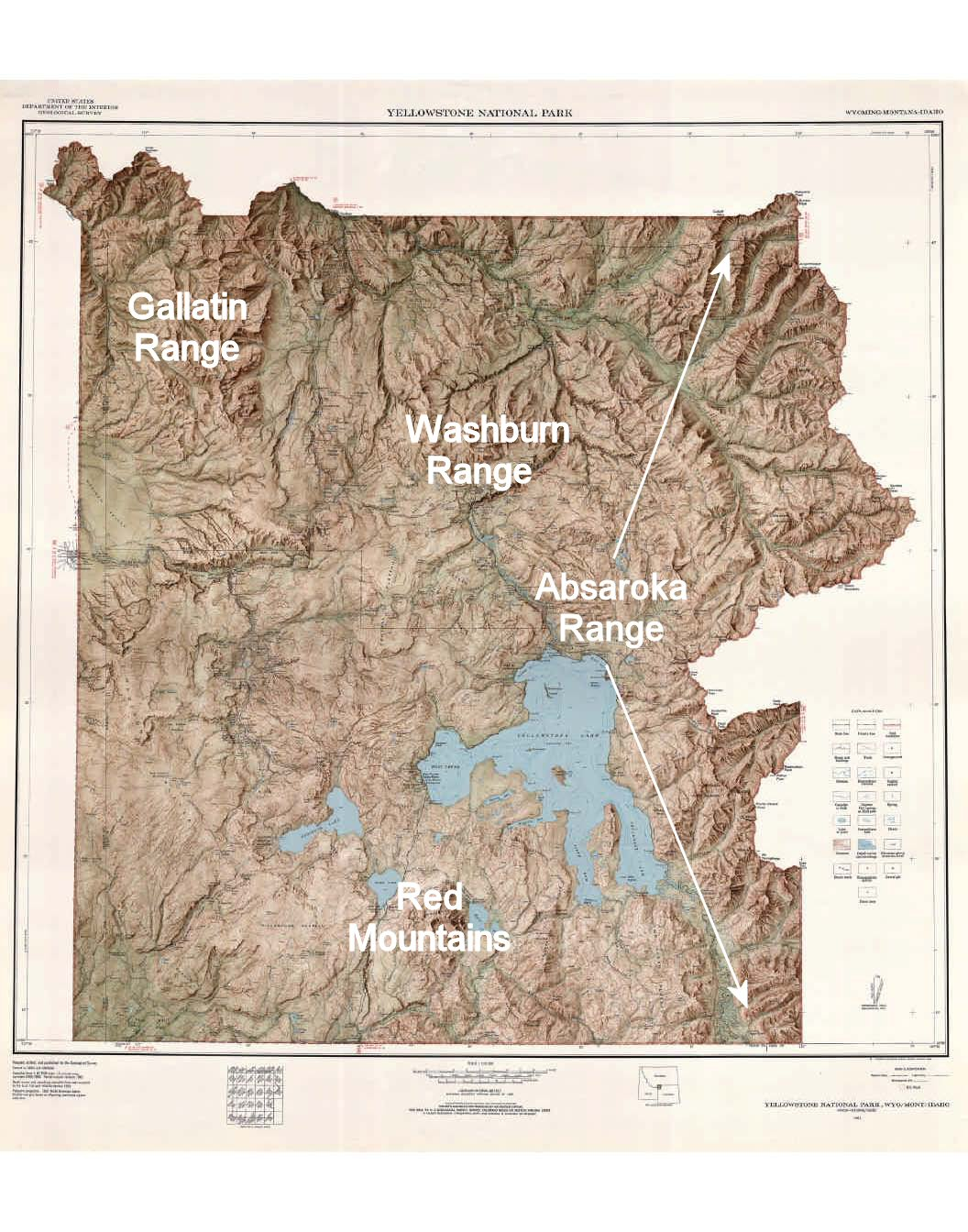
Mountain Ranges of Yellowstone

Yellowstone National Park, located primarily in the U.S. state of Wyoming, though the park also extends into Montana and Idaho and its Mountains and Mountain Ranges are part of the Rocky Mountains. There are at least 70 named mountain peaks over 8,000 feet (2,400 m) in Yellowstone in four mountain ranges. Two of the ranges—The Washburn Range and the Red Mountains—are minor and completely enclosed within park boundaries. The other two ranges are major, multi-state ranges that extend far beyond the boundaries of the park. The Gallatin Range begins approximately 75 miles (121 km) north of Yellowstone near Bozeman, Montana, and dominates the northwest corner of the park. The Absaroka Range, the largest range in the park, begins approximately 80 miles (130 km) north of the park near Livingston, Montana, along the Yellowstone River and runs southeast into, then south through the entire eastern side of the park to the Gros Ventre Range in Wyoming. The highest peak in the park, Eagle Peak is in the Absaroka Range. Yellowstone also has several isolated peaks over 8,000 feet (2,400 m) on the plateaus that dominate the central, western and southwestern sections of the park.

== Absaroka Range ==
- Eagle Peak - el. 11,358 feet (3,462 m); 44°19′15″N 110°01′40″W
- Mount Schurz - el. 11,165 feet (3,403 m); 44°20′33″N 110°04′19″W
- Table Mountain - el. 11,060 feet (3,370 m); 44°17′45″N 110°03′19″W
- Mount Humphreys - el. 10,952 feet (3,338 m); 44°19′58″N 110°03′43″W
- Abiathar Peak - el. 10,928 feet (3,331 m); 44°58′31″N 110°01′56″W
- Atkins Peak - el. 10,928 feet (3,331 m); 44°22′33″N 110°04′08″W
- Pollux Peak - el. 10,984 feet (3,348 m); 44°40′00″N 109°55′45″W
- Grant Peak - el. 10,850 feet (3,310 m); 44°37′49″N 109°56′50″W
- Turret Mountain - el. 10,840 feet (3,300 m); 44°16′22″N 110°03′38″W
- Castor Peak - el. 10,804 feet (3,293 m); 44°39′25″N 109°57′19″W
- Cutoff Mountain - el. 10,695 feet (3,260 m); 45°01′55″N 110°06′56″W
- Colter Peak - el. 10,640 feet (3,240 m); 44°18′06″N 110°06′36″W
- Mount Langford - el. 10,623 feet (3,238 m); 44°24′25″N 110°06′37″W
- The Trident - el. 10,620 feet (3,240 m); 44°11′36″N 110°00′43″W
- Reservation Peak - el. 10,617 feet (3,236 m); 44°25′54″N 110°01′37″W
- Silvertip Peak - el. 10,613 feet (3,235 m); 44°31′27″N 110°06′13″W
- Hoodoo Peak - el. 10,571 feet (3,222 m); 44°44′04″N 109°52′01″W
- First Peoples Mountain - el. 10,551 feet (3,216 m); 44°24′49″N 110°08′53″W
- Cathedral Peak - el. 10,548 feet (3,215 m); 44°34′14″N 110°06′39″W
- The Thunderer - el. 10,495 feet (3,199 m); 44°54′12″N 110°03′24″W
- Meridan Peak - el. 10,466 feet (3,190 m); 45°01′38″N 110°00′09″W
- Avalanche Peak (Wyoming) - el. 10,440 feet (3,180 m); 44°29′23″N 110°08′28″W
- Republic Peak - el. 10,410 feet (3,170 m); 44°57′03″N 109°56′59″W
- Saddle Mountain - el. 10,394 feet (3,168 m); 44°42′39″N 109°59′01″W
- Arthur Peak - el. 10,364 feet (3,159 m); 44°25′29″N 110°02′21″W
- Barronette Peak - el. 10,354 feet (3,156 m); 44°58′31″N 110°05′19″W
- Hoyt Peak - el. 10,344 feet (3,153 m); 44°28′38″N 110°07′43″W
- Hague Mountain - el. 10,292 feet (3,137 m); 44°42′21″N 110°00′02″W
- Amphitheater Mountain - el. 10,239 feet (3,121 m); 44°58′21″N 110°00′25″W
- Mount Stevenson - el. 10,230 feet (3,120 m); 44°24′06″N 110°09′34″W
- Sunset Peak - el. 10,201 feet (3,109 m); 45°02′43″N 110°00′01″W
- Cody Peak - el. 10,138 feet (3,090 m); 44°30′03″N 110°01′45″W
- Parker Peak - el. 10,095 feet (3,077 m); 44°43′24″N 109°53′39″W
- Mount Chittenden - el. 10,088 feet (3,075 m); 44°32′48″N 110°10′16″W
- Top Notch Peak - el. 10,062 feet (3,067 m); 44°27′08″N 110°08′40″W
- Mount Hornaday - el. 10,003 feet (3,049 m); 44°56′42″N 110°08′46″W
- Grizzly Peak - el. 9,915 feet (3,022 m); 44°28′07″N 110°10′34″W
- The Needle - el. 9,862 feet (3,006 m); 44°51′56″N 110°00′13″W
- Mount Norris - el. 9,842 feet (3,000 m); 44°52′28″N 110°05′41″W
- Cache Mountain - el. 9,593 feet (2,924 m); 44°53′40″N 109°58′35″W
- Druid Peak - el. 9,577 feet (2,919 m); 44°54′16″N 110°10′45″W
- Frederick Peak - el. 9,475 feet (2,888 m); 44°55′45″N 110°11′36″W
- Bison Peak - el. 8,924 feet (2,720 m); 44°56′33″N 110°13′37″W
- Hellroaring Mountain - el. 8,347 feet (2,544 m); 45°00′10″N 110°26′40″W

== Gallatin Range ==
Gallatin Range Panorama
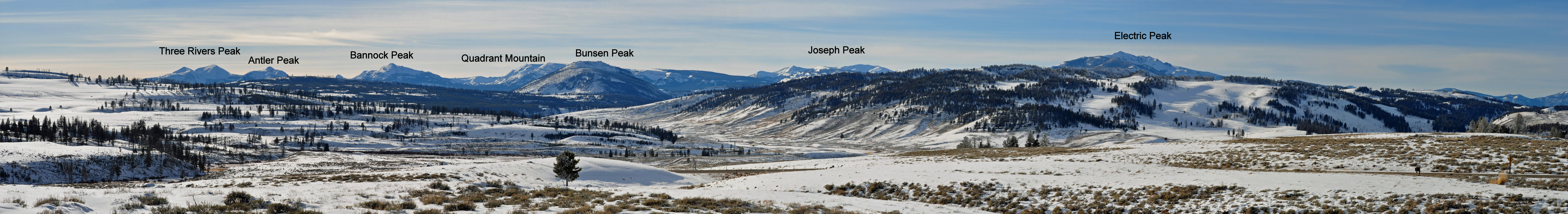
From Blacktail Plateau, 2010
- Electric Peak - el. 10,969 feet (3,343 m); 45°00′19″N 110°50′12″W
- Joseph Peak - el. 10,420 feet (3,180 m); 44°57′31″N 110°53′05″W
- Mount Holmes - el. 10,331 feet (3,149 m); 44°49′08″N 110°51′21″W
- Gray Peak - el. 10,298 feet (3,139 m); 44°56′41″N 110°52′49″W
- Bannock Peak - el. 10,292 feet (3,137 m); 44°53′30″N 110°52′21″W
- Antler Peak - el. 10,063 feet (3,067 m); 44°52′07″N 110°50′11″W
- Trilobite Point - el. 10,010 feet (3,050 m); 44°49′01″N 110°50′38″W
- Quadrant Mountain - el. 9,954 feet (3,034 m); 44°54′14″N 110°49′56″W
- Big Horn Peak - el. 9,935 feet (3,028 m); 45°03′58″N 111°03′23″W
- Dome Mountain - el. 9,826 feet (2,995 m); 44°50′22″N 110°50′27″W
- Three Rivers Peak - el. 9,764 feet (2,976 m); 44°51′01″N 110°53′00″W
- Sepulcher Mountain - el. 9,642 feet (2,939 m); 44°59′25″N 110°46′01″W
- Echo Peak - el. 9,570 feet (2,920 m); 44°50′52″N 110°52′59″W
- White Peaks - el. 9,472 feet (2,887 m); 44°48′52″N 110°52′25″W
- Meldrum Mountain - el. 9,468 feet (2,886 m); 45°02′51″N 111°00′57″W
- Bunsen Peak - el. 8,527 feet (2,599 m); 44°55′54″N 110°42′25″W
- Purple Mountain - el. 8,392 feet (2,558 m); 44°40′02″N 110°51′44″W
- Mount Jackson - el. 8,231 feet (2,509 m); 44°39′09″N 110°55′46″W
- Mount Haynes - el. 8,218 feet (2,505 m);44°37′58″N 110°56′46″W
- Clagett Butte - el. 8,041 feet (2,451 m); 44°57′52″N 110°44′06″W
- Terrace Mountain - el. 8,002 feet (2,439 m) 44°57′20″N 110°44′08″W
- Three Brothers Mountains - el. 7,116 feet (2,169 m) 44°37′59″N 110°53′16″W
- Mount Everts - el. 7,831 feet (2,387 m); 44°58′30″N 110°39′41″W

== Washburn Range ==
- Mount Washburn - el. 10,223 feet (3,116 m); 44°47′51″N 110°26′00″W
- Dunraven Peak - el. 9,869 feet (3,008 m); 44°46′58″N 110°28′10″W
- Cook Peak - el. 9,754 feet (2,973 m); 44°50′34″N 110°34′31″W
- Hedges Peak - el. 9,669 feet (2,947 m); 44°46′39″N 110°28′47″W
- Amethyst Mountain - el. 9,609 feet (2,929 m); 44°49′43″N 110°15′15″W
- Prospect Peak - el. 9,527 feet (2,904 m); 44°53′17″N 110°30′10″W
- Observation Peak - el. 9,390 feet (2,860 m); 44°46′19″N 110°32′53″W
- Folsom Peak - el. 9,334 feet (2,845 m); 44°52′22″N 110°32′51″W
- Specimen Ridge - el. 8,379 feet (2,554 m); 44°52′13″N 110°17′48″W

== Red Mountains ==
- Mount Sheridan- el. 10,298 feet (3,139 m); 44°15′58″N 110°31′46″W
- Factory Hill - el. 9,527 feet (2,904 m); 44°17′42″N 110°32′01″W

== Isolated summits ==
- Mount Hancock - el. 10,223 feet (3,116 m); 44°09′19″N 110°25′03″W
- Barlow Peak - el. 9,609 feet (2,929 m); 44°10′58″N 110°22′38″W
- Channel Mountain - el. 8,750 feet (2,670 m); 44°16′35″N 110°22′29″W
- Elephant Back Mountain - el. 8,592 feet (2,619 m); 44°33′15″N 110°28′02″W
- Trischman Knob - el. 8,573 feet (2,613 m); 44°20′22″N 110°52′39″W
- Douglas Knob - el. 8,507 feet (2,593 m); 44°18′48″N 110°50′51″W
- Horseshoe Hill - el. 8,274 feet (2,522 m); 44°50′14″N 110°40′50″W
- Roaring Mountain - el 8,153 feet (2,485 m); 44°46′38″N 110°43′39″W

== See also ==
- Plateaus of Yellowstone National Park
- List of mountain ranges in Wyoming
