= Prospect Peak =

Prospect Peak may refer to:

- Prospect Peak (Park County, Wyoming), U.S.
- Prospect Peak Fire Lookout, Lassen Volcanic National Park, near Mineral, California, U.S.
