= Dome Mountain (Wyoming) =

Mountain in Wyoming, United States

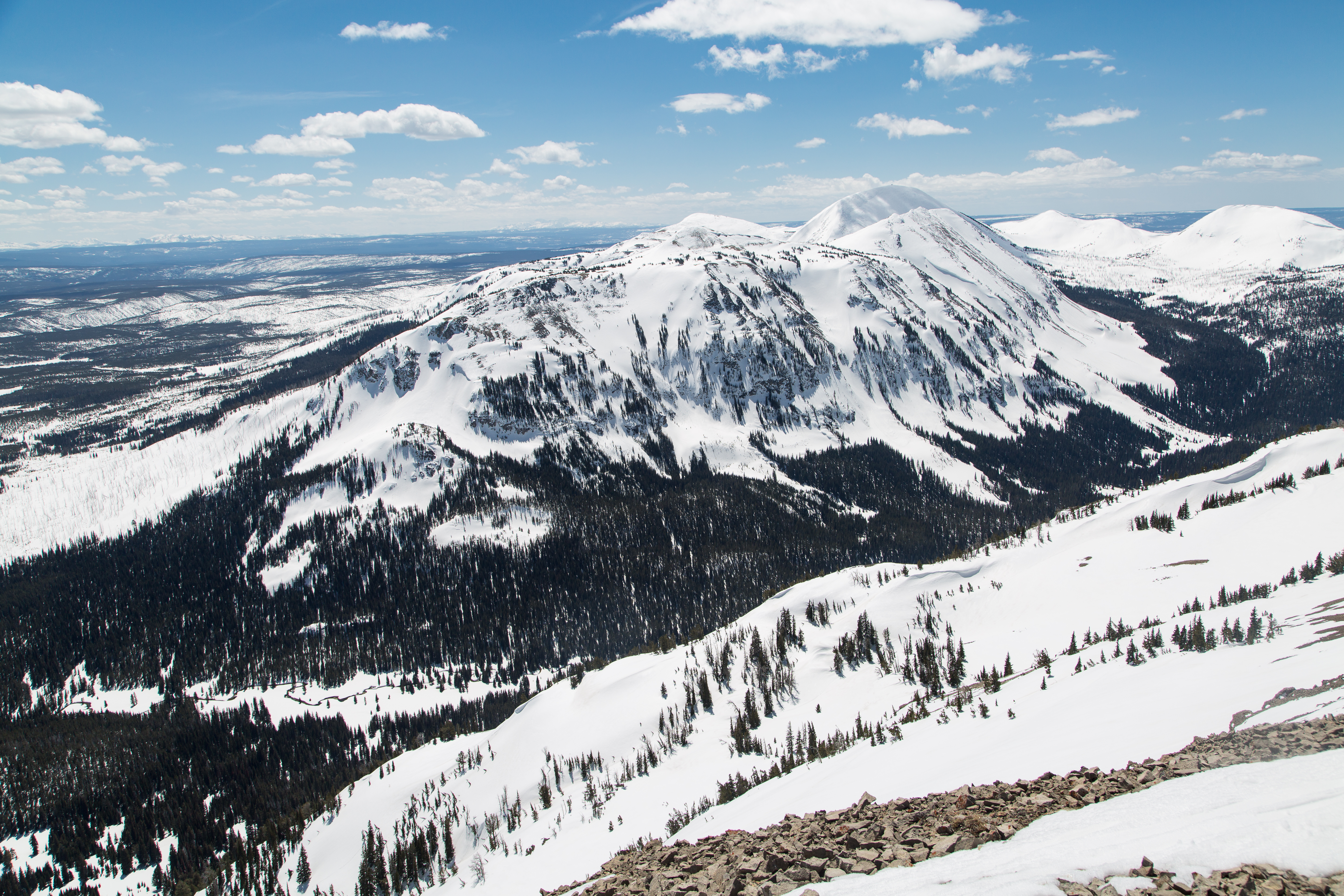
- North aspect, from Antler Peak

Highest point
- Elevation: 9,903 ft (3,018 m)
- Prominence: 263 ft (80 m)
- Isolation: 0.57 mi (0.92 km)
- Coordinates: 44°50′22″N 110°50′27″W

Geography
- Location within Wyoming Location within the United States
- Location: Yellowstone National Park; Park County, Wyoming
- Parent range: Gallatin Range
- Topo map: USGS Mount Holmes

Dome Mountain, elevation 9,903 feet (3,018 m), is a mountain peak in the southern section of the Gallatin Range in Yellowstone National Park, in the U.S. state of Wyoming.

== Climate ==
Location in the southern Gallatin Range of northern Wyoming

According to the Köppen climate classification system, Dome Mountain has an alpine subarctic climate with long, cold, snowy winters, and cool to mild summers. Winter temperatures can drop below −10 °F with wind chill factors below −30 °F.

== See also ==
- Mountains and mountain ranges of Yellowstone National Park
