= Terrace Mountain (Wyoming) =

Mountain in Wyoming, United States

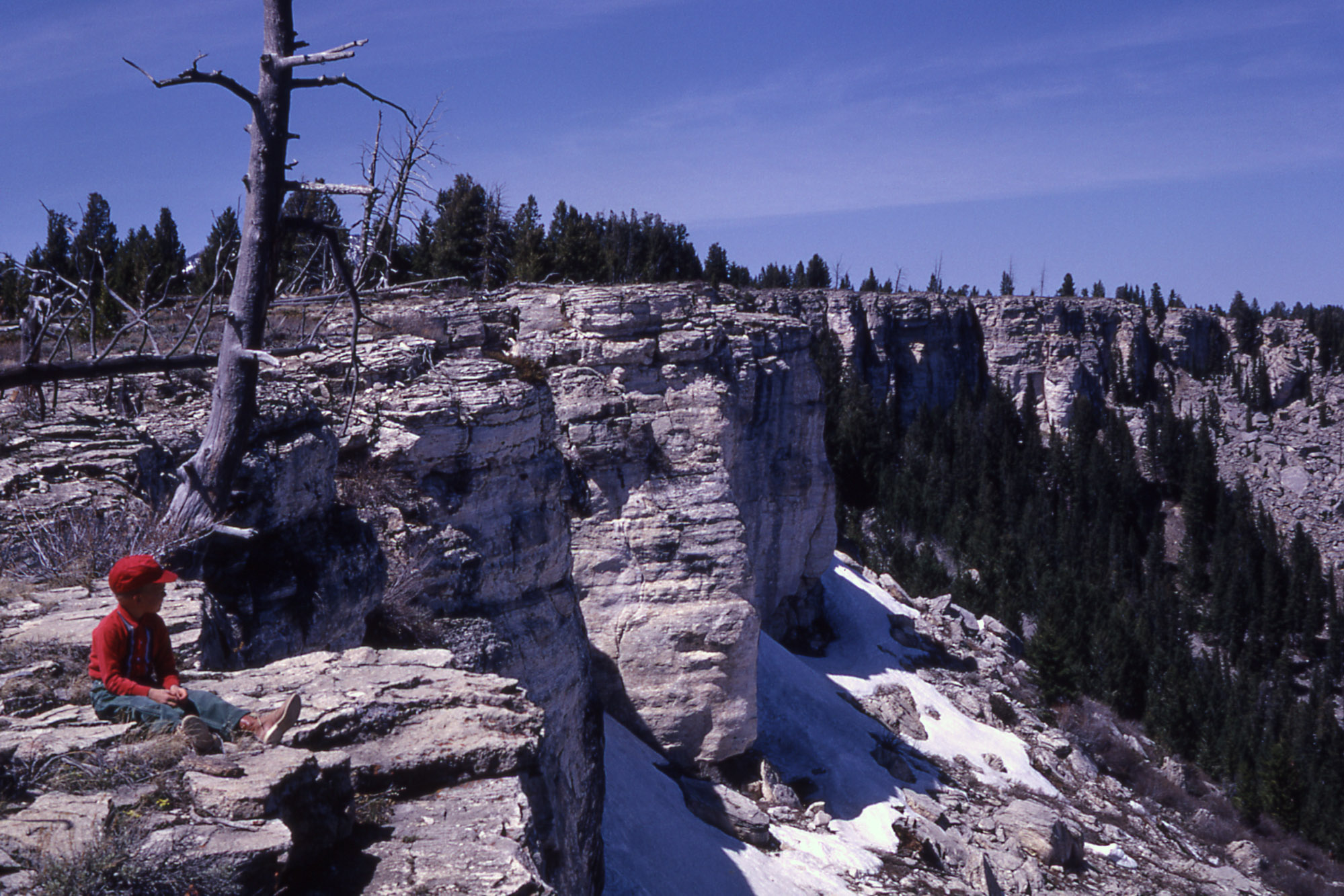
- Summit, 1966

Highest point
- Elevation: 8,002 ft (2,439 m)
- Coordinates: 44°57′20″N 110°44′08″W

Geography
- Location: Yellowstone National Park, Park County, Wyoming
- Parent range: Gallatin Range
- Topo map: Mammoth

Terrace Mountain (elev. 8,002 ft or 2,439 m) is a mountain peak in the Gallatin Range in Yellowstone National Park in Park County, Wyoming, United States. The mountain is located 2.2 miles (3.5 km) southwest of Mammoth Hot Springs. Terrace Mountain was named by the 1878 Hayden Geological Survey because of its proximity to the travertine terraces at Mammoth and because it too is an ancient travertine terrace. The mountain has also been known as "Soda Mountain" and "White Mountain".

Although there are no maintained trails to the summit, Terrace Mountain is flanked within .5 miles (0.80 km) by the Snow Pass, Fawn Pass and Hoodoo trails.

== See also ==
- List of mountains of Wyoming
- Mountains and mountain ranges of Yellowstone National Park
