= Gray Peak (Wyoming) =

Mountain in Wyoming, United States

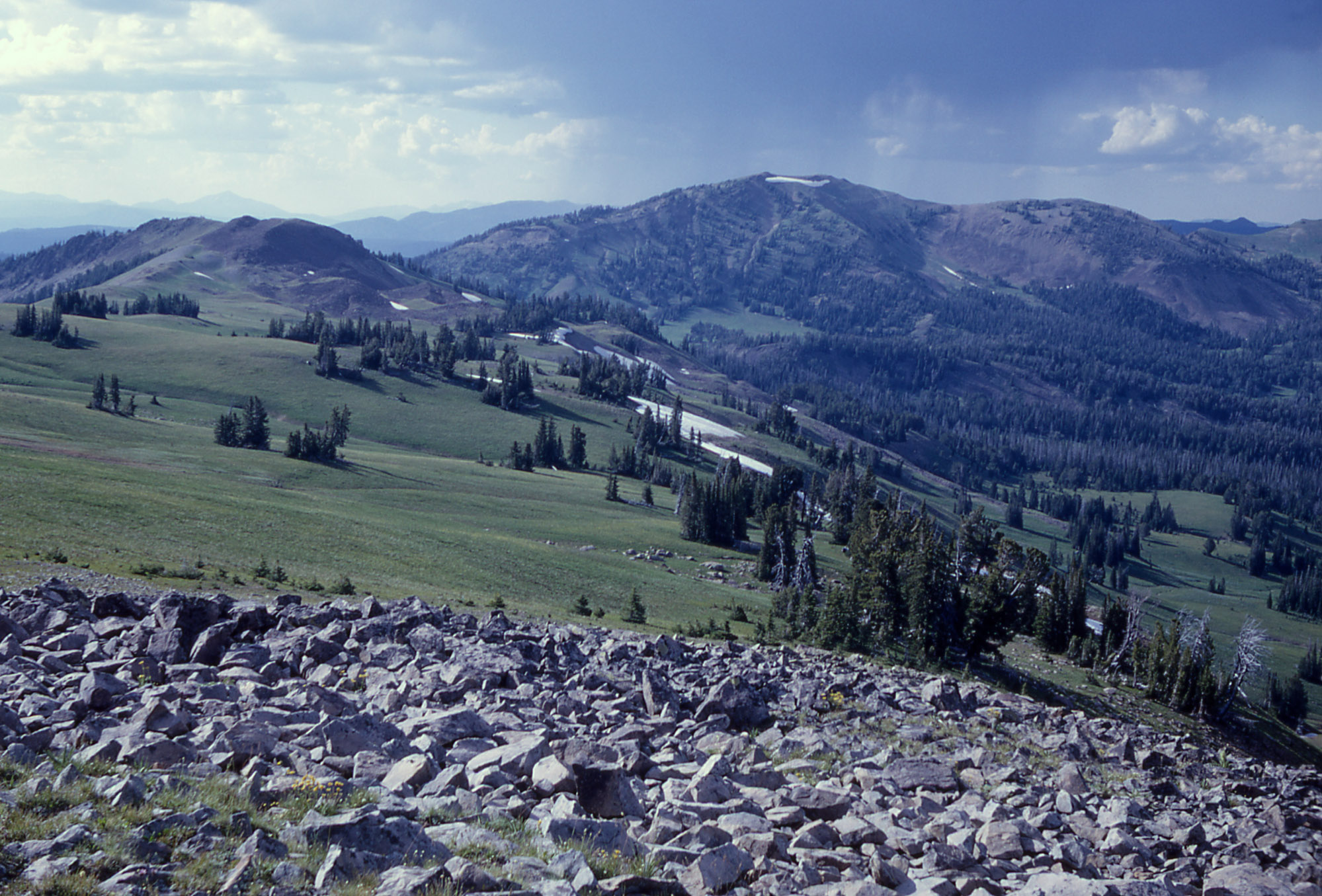
- Gray Peak from the west, 1965

Highest point
- Elevation: 10,298 ft (3,139 m)
- Coordinates: 44°56′41″N 110°52′49″W

Geography
- Location within Wyoming
- Location: Yellowstone National Park, Park County, Wyoming, U.S.
- Parent range: Gallatin Range
- Topo map: USGS Joseph Peak

Gray Peak el. 10,298 feet (3,139 m) is a prominent mountain peak in the Gallatin Range in the remote northwest section of Yellowstone National Park, Wyoming. The peak is approximately 9.1 miles (14.6 km) west-southwest of Mammoth Hot Springs and 8.9 miles (14.3 km) north of Mount Holmes. There are no maintained trails to the summit. The closest maintained trail is the Fawn Pass Trail which skirts the southern face approximately 1 mile (1.6 km) south of the peak.

== See also ==
- Mountains and mountain ranges of Yellowstone National Park

== Notes ==
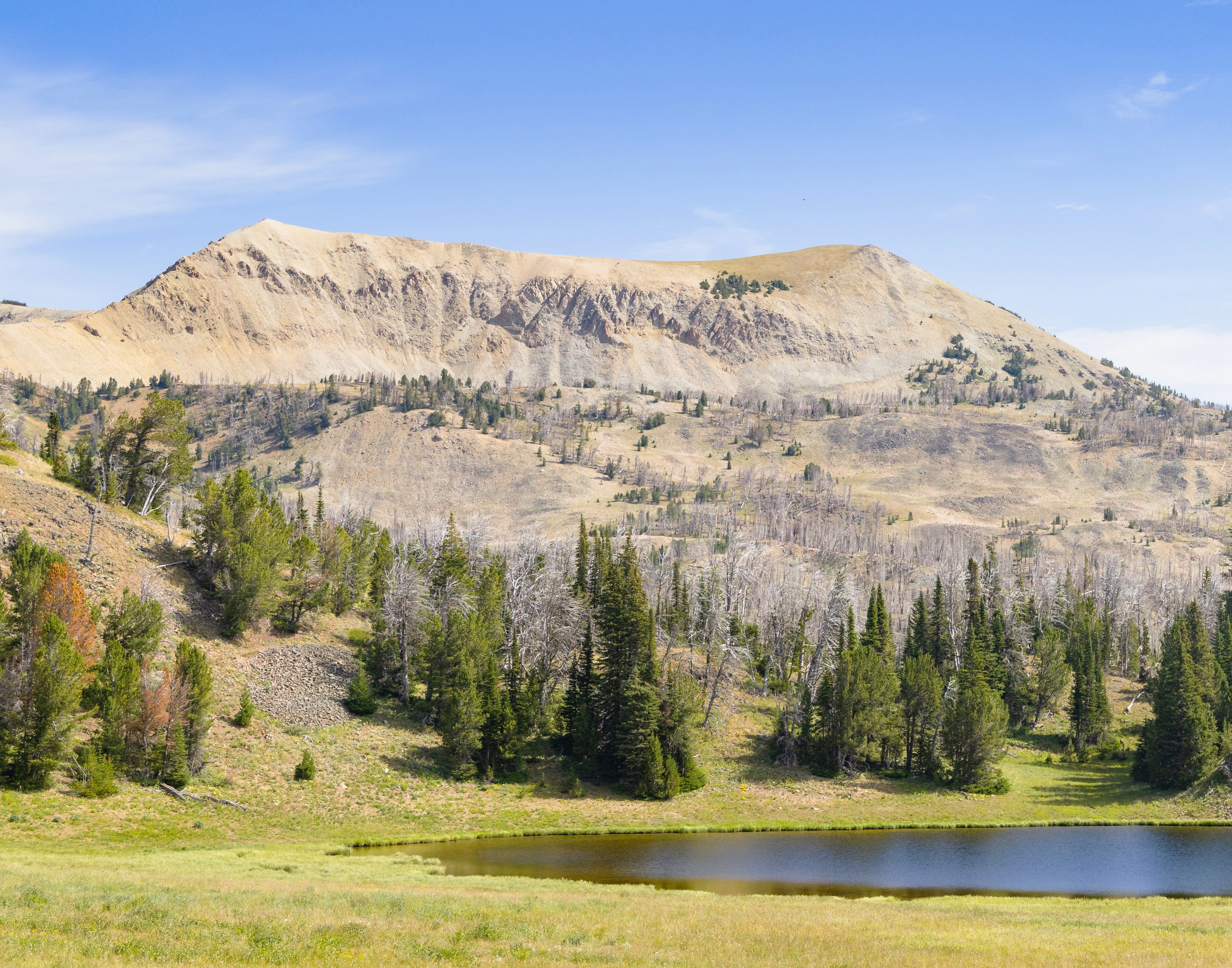
Southwest aspect of Gray Peak from the Fawn Pass area
