= Quadrant Mountain =

Mountain in Wyoming, United States

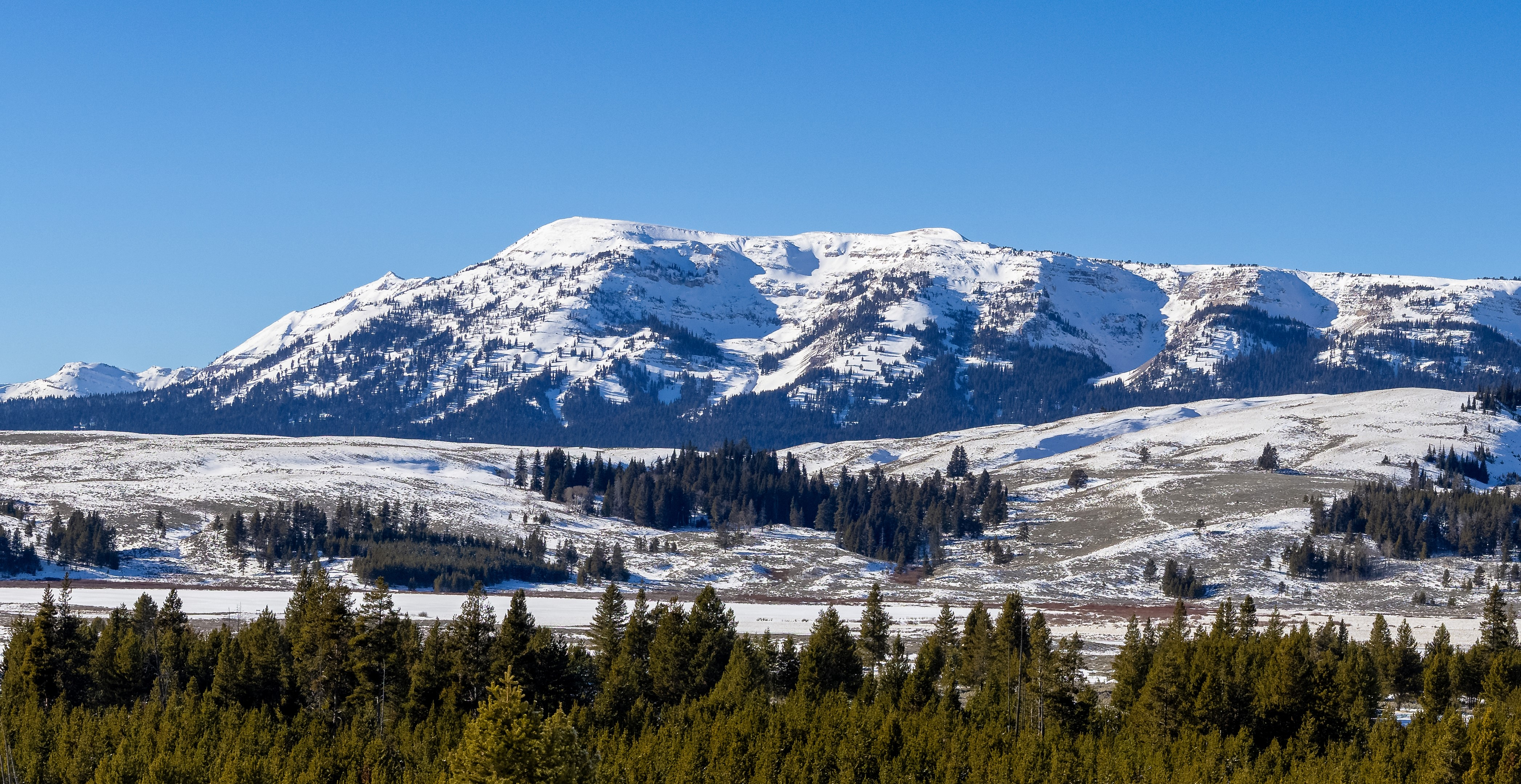
- East aspect

Highest point
- Elevation: 10,217 ft (3,114 m)
- Prominence: 541 ft (165 m)
- Coordinates: 44.9028733°N 110.8602558°W

Geography
- Location within Wyoming Location within the United States
- Country: United States
- State: Wyoming
- County: Park
- Protected area: Yellowstone National Park
- Parent range: Gallatin Range
- Topo map: USGS Quadrant Mountain

Quadrant Mountain, elevation 10,217 feet (3,114 m), is a summit in the southern section of the Gallatin Range in Yellowstone National Park of Wyoming, United States. The mountain's toponym was officially adopted in 1930 by the United States Board on Geographic Names.

== See also ==
- Mountains and mountain ranges of Yellowstone National Park
