= Mount Chittenden =

Mountain in Montana, United States

- Location within Wyoming

Highest point
- Elevation: 10,182 ft (3,103 m) NGVD 29
- Prominence: 577 ft (176 m)
- Coordinates: 44°32′48″N 110°10′16″W

Geography
- Location: Yellowstone National Park, Park County, Wyoming
- Parent range: Absaroka Range
- Topo map: Mount Chittenden

Mount Chittenden, elevation 10,182 feet (3,103 m), is a mountain peak in the Absaroka Range in Yellowstone National Park. The peak was named by Henry Gannett of the Hayden Geological Survey of 1878 for George B. Chittenden, a surveyor who had worked with Gannett, Hayden and others in surveys in Montana, Idaho and Wyoming. Chittenden never participated in any of the Yellowstone surveys.

Mount Chittenden was not named for Major Hiram M. Chittenden, the U.S. Army Engineer famous for his road and bridge work in the park.

== See also ==
- Mountains and mountain ranges of Yellowstone National Park
