= Atkins Peak =

Mountain in Wyoming, United States

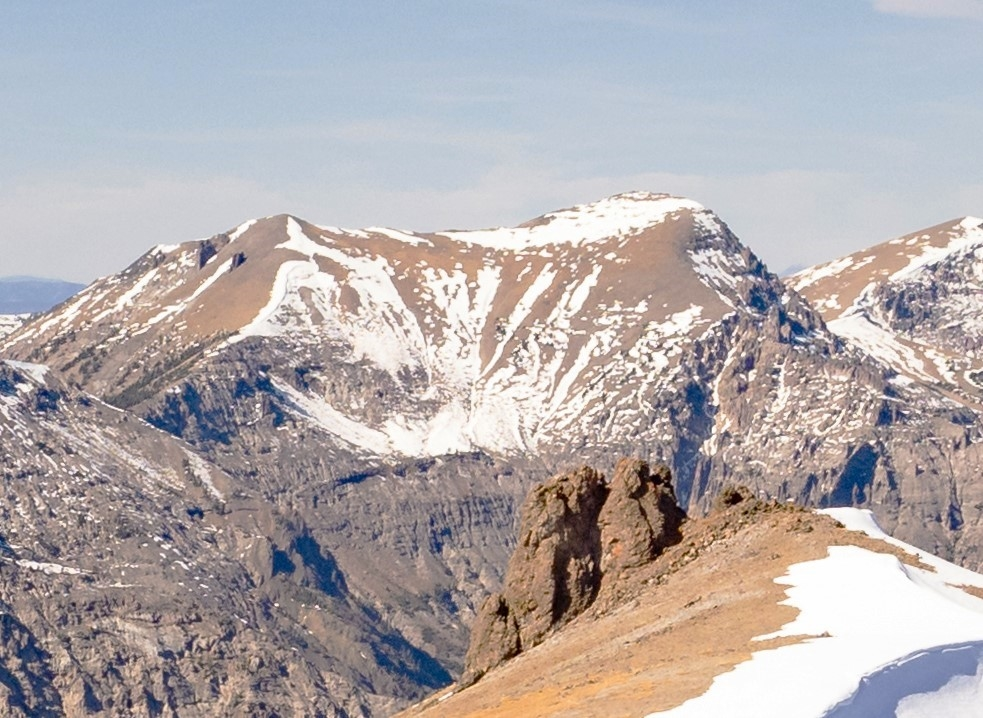
- South-southeast aspect

Highest point
- Elevation: 10,928 ft (3,331 m)
- Coordinates: 44°22′33″N 110°04′08″W

Geography
- Location: Yellowstone National Park, Park County, Wyoming
- Parent range: Absaroka Range

Atkins Peak, elevation 10,928 feet (3,331 m), is a mountain peak in the eastern section of the Absaroka Range in Yellowstone National Park, in the U.S. state of Wyoming.

== See also ==
- Mountains and mountain ranges of Yellowstone National Park
