= Hedges Peak =

Mountain in Wyoming, United States

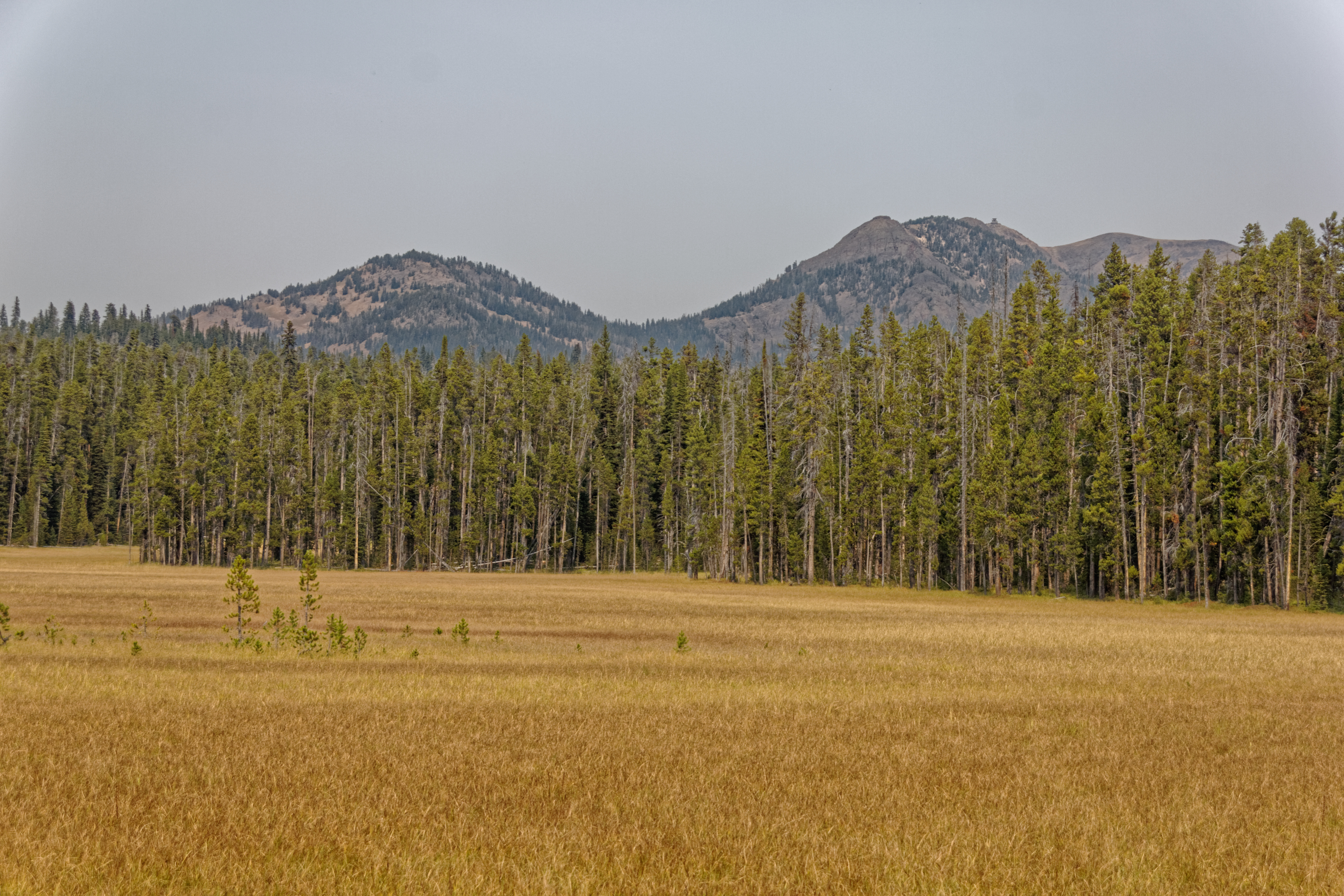
- Hedges Peak (left) and Dunraven Peak (right)

Highest point
- Elevation: 9,669 ft (2,947 m)
- Coordinates: 44°46′39″N 110°28′47″W

Geography
- Location within Wyoming
- Location: Yellowstone National Park, Park County, Wyoming
- Parent range: Washburn Range
- Topo map: USGS Mount Washburn

Hedges Peak, elevation 9,669 feet (2,947 m), is a mountain peak in the Washburn Range in Yellowstone National Park, in the U.S. state of Wyoming. The peak was named in 1895 by geologist Arnold Hague to honor Cornelius Hedges (1837–1907), a member of the Washburn–Langford–Doane Expedition of 1871 and a prominent Montana lawyer. Hedges' accounts of the expedition in the Helena Daily Herald newspaper contributed to the campaign to create Yellowstone National Park. Prior to 1895 the peak had been named Surprise Peak by geologist J.P. Iddings in 1883.

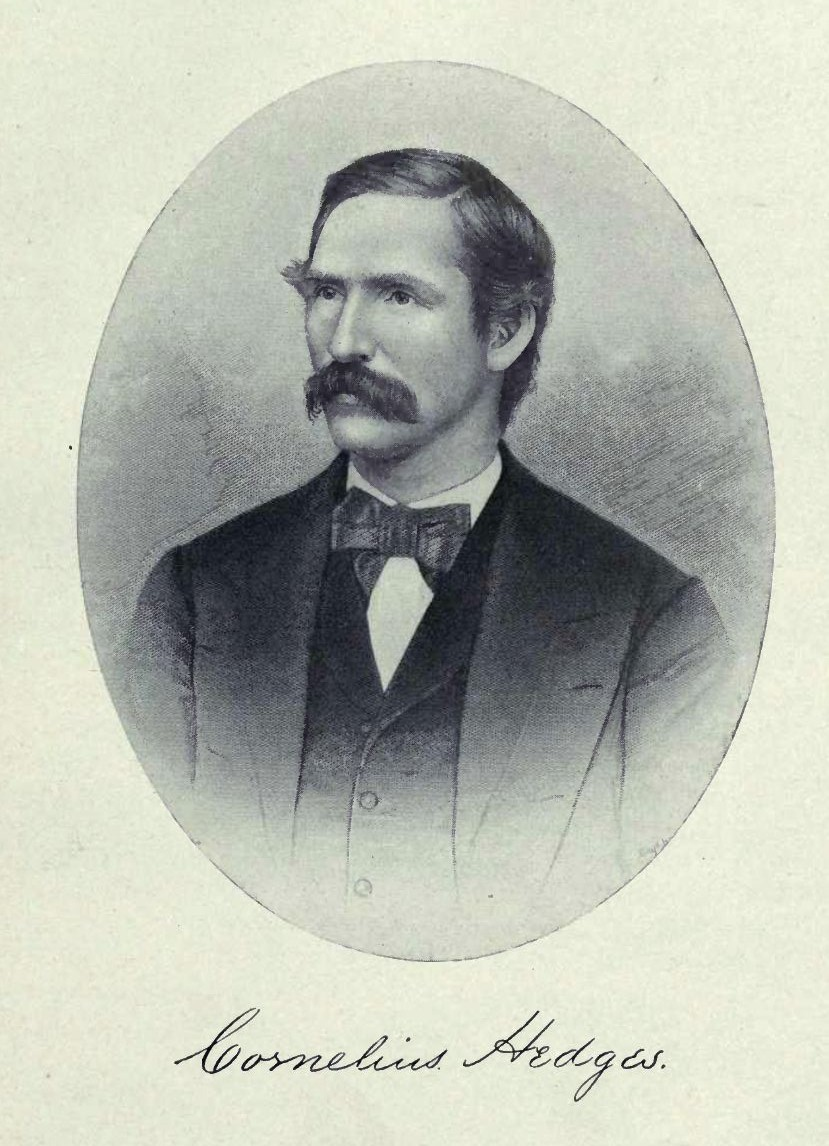
Hedges Peak's namesake, Cornelius Hedges

== See also ==
- Mountains and mountain ranges of Yellowstone National Park
