= Bannock Peak =

Mountain in Wyoming, United States

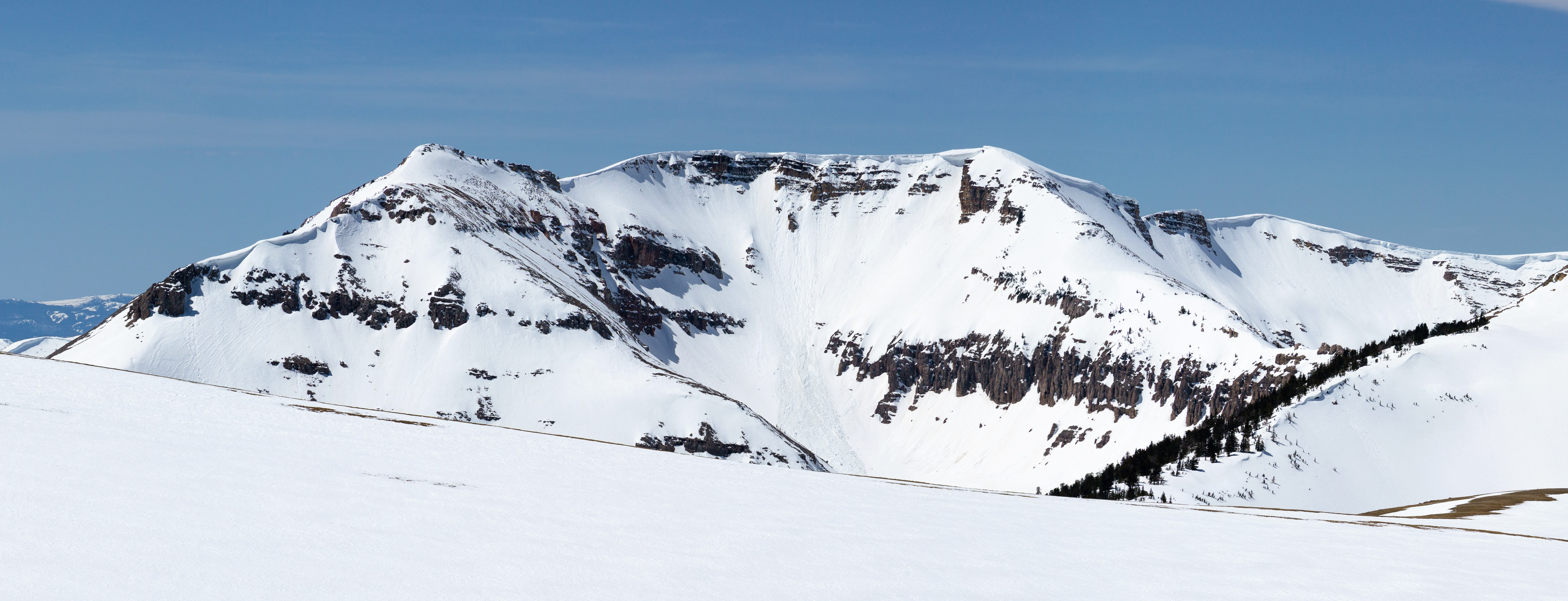
- Northeast aspect

Highest point
- Elevation: 10,329 ft (3,148 m)
- Prominence: 1,227 ft (374 m)
- Parent peak: Mount Holmes
- Isolation: 4.64 mi (7.47 km)
- Coordinates: 44.8921399°N 110.8720818°W

Naming
- Etymology: Bannock Trail

Geography
- Location within Wyoming Location within the United States
- Country: United States
- State: Wyoming
- County: Park
- Protected area: Yellowstone National Park
- Parent range: Gallatin Range; Rocky Mountains
- Topo map: USGS Quadrant Mountain

Bannock Peak is a 10,329-foot (3,148-metre) mountain summit in the southern section of the Gallatin Range in Yellowstone National Park, in the U.S. state of Wyoming. The peak ranks as the sixth-highest peak in the Gallatin Range. Precipitation runoff from the mountain drains west into headwaters of the Gallatin River and east into Panther Creek which is a tributary of the Gardner River. Topographic relief is significant as the summit rises nearly 2,000 feet (610 meters) above Panther Creek in one mile (1.6 km). This mountain's toponym was officially adopted in 1897 by the United States Board on Geographic Names.

== Climate ==
Based on the Köppen climate classification, the mountain is located in a subarctic climate zone characterized by long, usually very cold winters, and mild summers. Winter temperatures can drop below 0 °F with wind chill factors below −10 °F.

== See also ==
- Mountains and mountain ranges of Yellowstone National Park
