= Factory Hill =

Mountain in Wyoming, United States

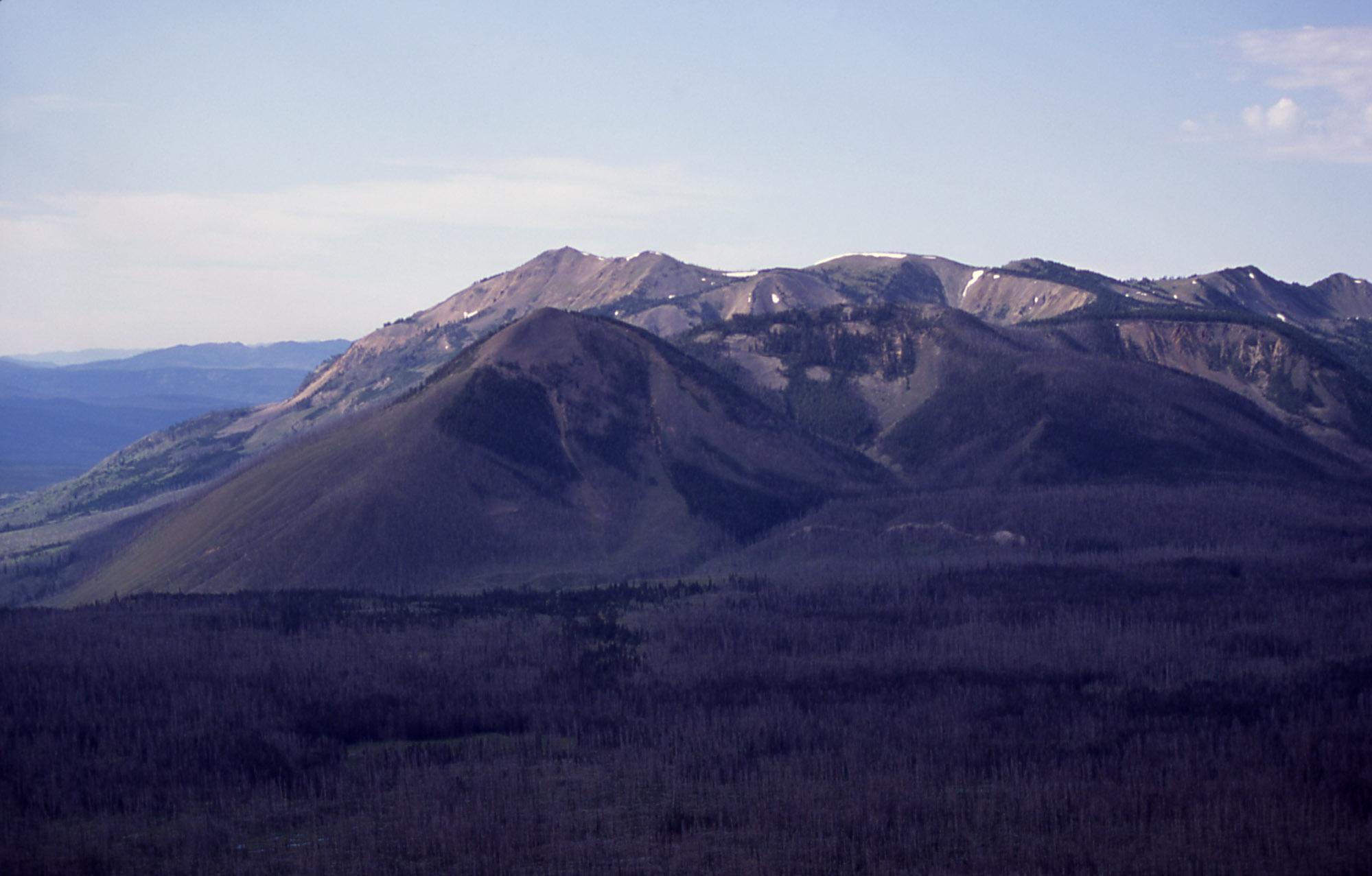
- Red Mountains, Factory Hill in foreground

Highest point
- Elevation: 9,527 ft (2,904 m)
- Coordinates: 44°17′42″N 110°32′01″W

Geography
- Location within Wyoming
- Location: Yellowstone National Park, Park County, Wyoming, US
- Parent range: Red Mountains
- Topo map: USGS Mount Sheridan

Factory Hill el. 9,527 feet (2,904 m) is a mountain peak in the Red Mountains of Yellowstone National Park. It is directly north of Mount Sheridan and west of the Heart Lake Geyser Basin. Early in the history of Yellowstone, this peak was called Red Mountain by the Hayden surveys, a name later transferred to the range in which it resides. In 1885, the Hague Geological Survey gave the peak its present name based on the following passage by Nathaniel P. Langford in his 1871 Scribner's account of the Washburn–Langford–Doane Expedition. Langford's party was camped near the south arm of Yellowstone Lake at the time.

Factory Hill was so named because the noise and steam proceeding from them resembled in this respect an active factory town.

Through the hazy atmosphere we beheld, on the shore of the inlet opposite our camp, the steam ascending in jets from more than fifty craters [Heart Lake Geyser Basin] giving it much the appearance of a New England factory village.

— Nathaniel P. Langford, Scribner's, February, 1871

== See also ==
- Mountains and mountain ranges of Yellowstone National Park
