= Hoodoo Peak (Wyoming) =

Mountain in Wyoming, United States

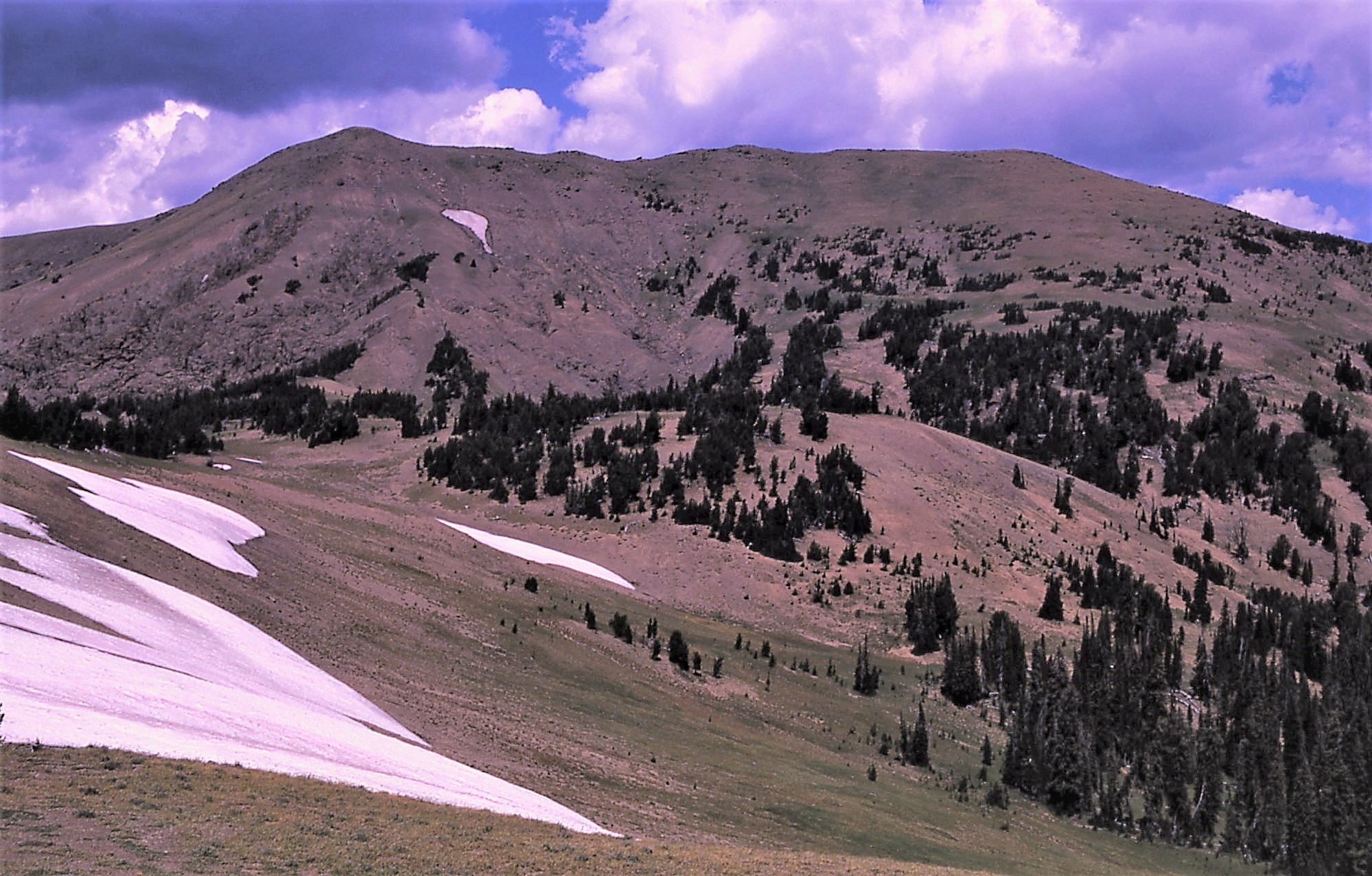
- South aspect, circa 1964

Highest point
- Elevation: 10,571 ft (3,222 m)
- Prominence: 821 ft (250 m)
- Parent peak: Peak 10660
- Isolation: 2.80 mi (4.51 km)
- Coordinates: 44°44′04″N 109°52′01″W

Naming
- Etymology: hoodoo

Geography
- Location within Wyoming Location within the United States
- Location: Yellowstone National Park; Park County, Wyoming, U.S.
- Parent range: Absaroka Range; Rocky Mountains
- Topo map: USGS Stinkingwater Peak

Geology
- Rock type: volcanic breccia

Hoodoo Peak is a 10,571-foot-elevation (3,222-meter) mountain summit located in Park County, Wyoming, United States.

== Description ==
This remote peak is situated along the common border shared by Yellowstone National Park and North Absaroka Wilderness, and it ranks as the 24th-highest peak in the park. It is part of the Absaroka Range which is a subset of Rocky Mountains. Topographic relief is significant as the south aspect rises over 2,000 feet (610 meters) above Hoodoo Basin in 1.5 mile, and the east aspect rises 1,800 feet (550 meters) above Hoodoo Creek in one mile. From the summit one can see 30 miles north to Granite Peak which is the highest point in Montana, and as far south as the Tetons, 80 miles distant.

== History ==
Prospectors named Hoodoo Basin, below the southern slopes of the peak, which refers to geologic formations called hoodoos found there. When Philetus Norris, the second superintendent of Yellowstone Park, climbed the peak in 1880, he took note of the hoodoos. In his report he used an aneroid barometer to measure the summit elevation to be 10,700 feet and wrote: "Here, extending from 500 to 1,500 below the summit, the frosts and storms of untold ages in an Alpine climate have worn about a dozen labyrinths of countless deep, narrow, tortuous channels amid the long, slender, tottering pillars, shafts, and spires of the conglomerate breccia and other remaining volcanic rocks. Here the sharp-cornered fragments of rocks of nearly every size, form, formation, and shade of coloring, by a peculiar volcanic cement attached sidewise, endwise, and upon the tops, sides, and, apparently, unsupported, upon each other, represent every form, garb, and posture of gigantic human beings, as well as of birds, beasts, and reptiles. In fact, nearly every form, animate or inanimate, real or chimerical, ever actually seen or conjured by the imagination, may here be observed." The mountain has also been known as Goblin Peak, but the mountain's hoodoo name was officially adopted in 1895 by the United States Board on Geographic Names.

== Climate ==
According to the Köppen climate classification system, Hoodoo Peak is located in an alpine subarctic climate zone with long, cold, snowy winters, and cool to mild summers. Winter temperatures can drop below −10 °F with wind chill factors below −30 °F. Precipitation runoff from the mountain drains west into headwaters of the Lamar River, and east into tributaries of the Clarks Fork Yellowstone River.

== Gallery ==
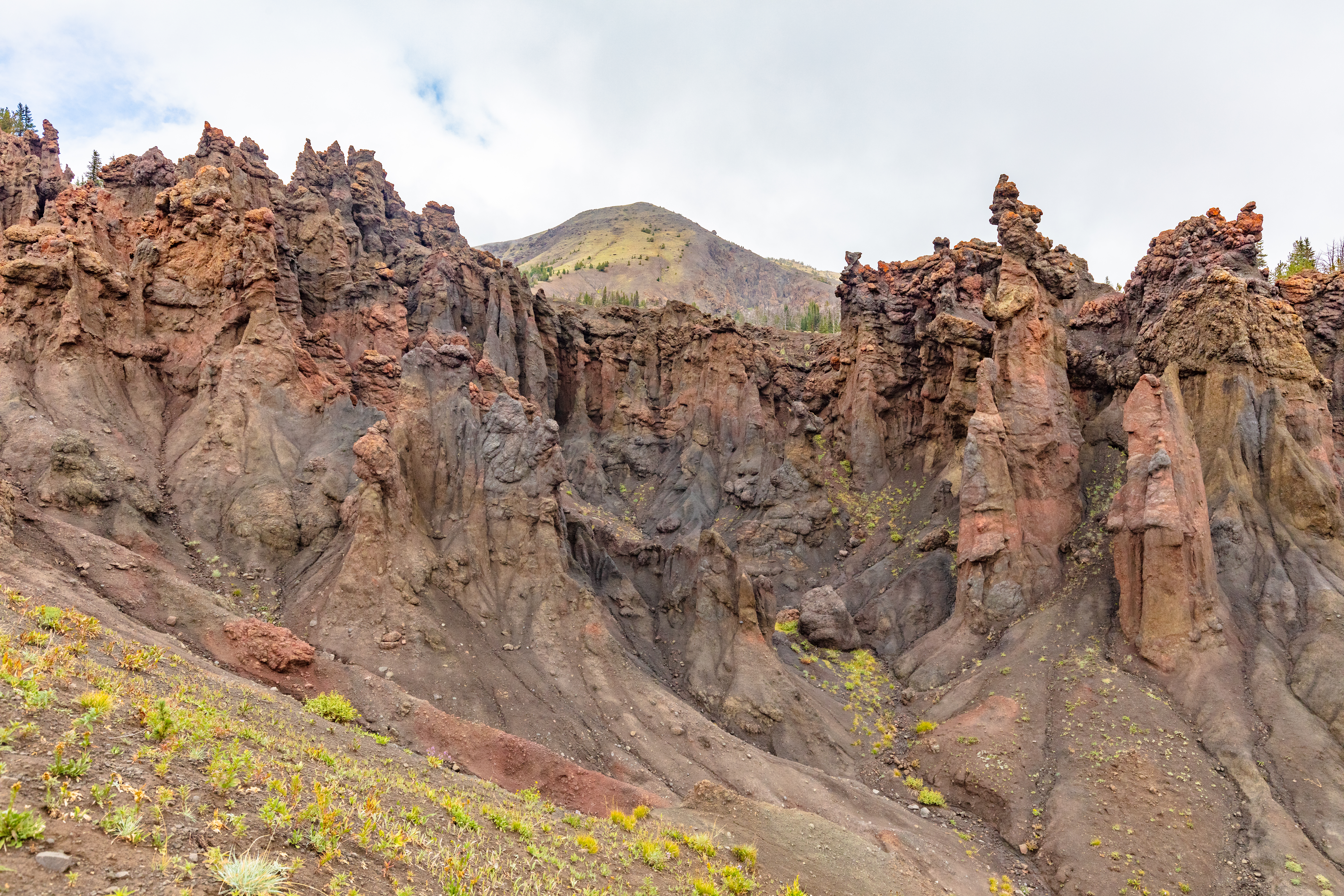
Hoodoo Peak framed by features in Hoodoo Basin

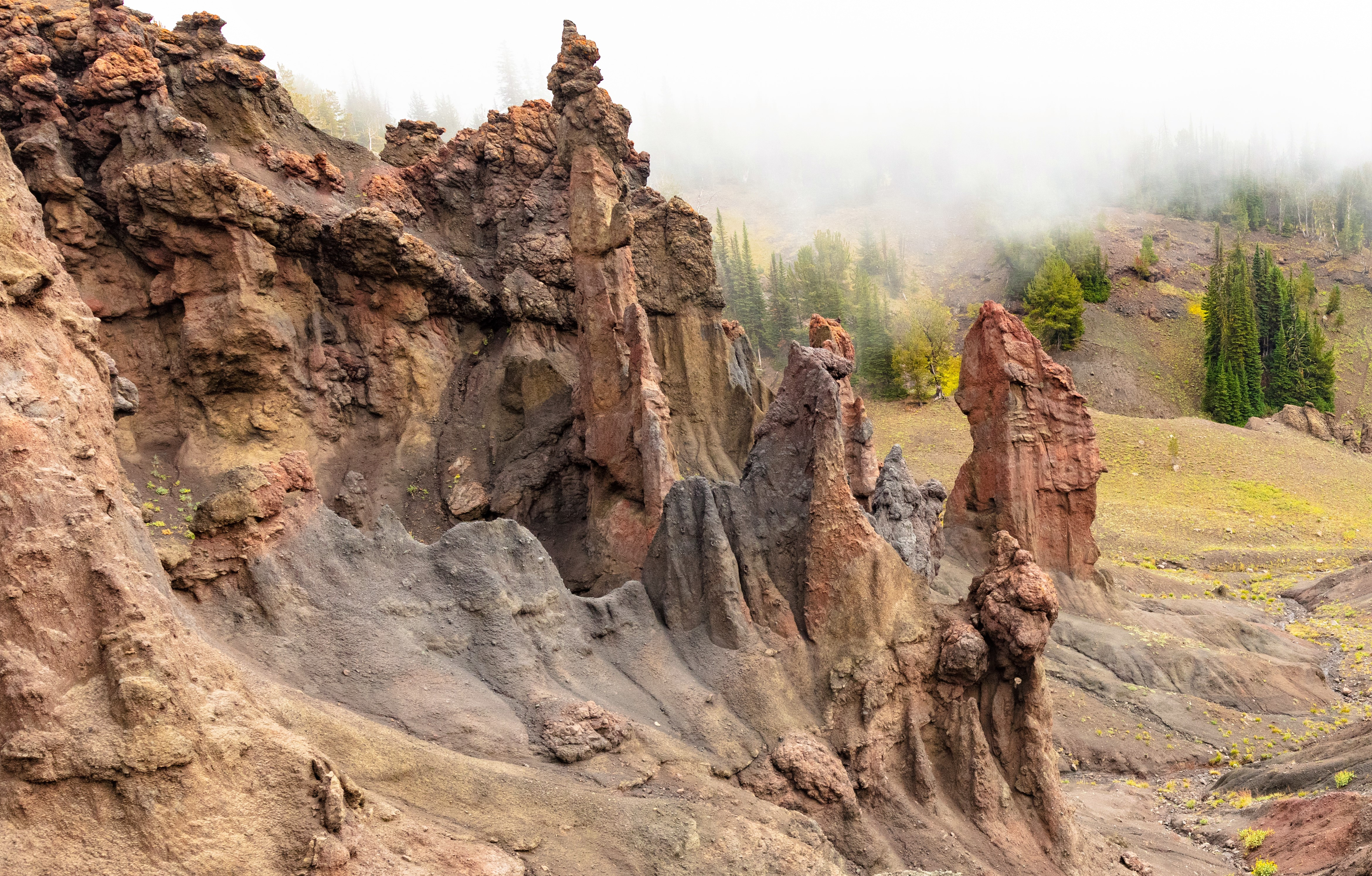
Hoodoos in Hoodoo Basin

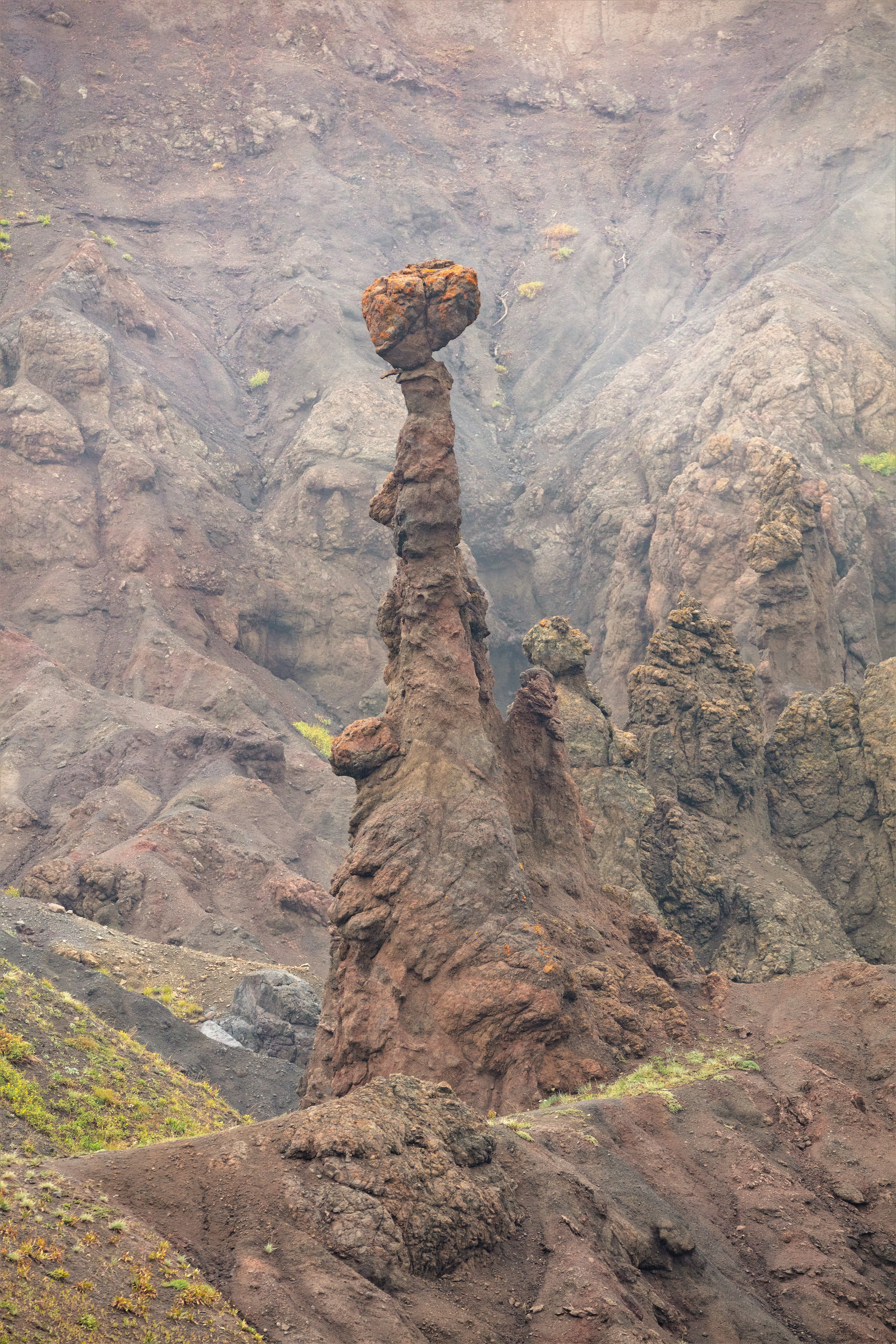
Hoodoo in Hoodoo Basin

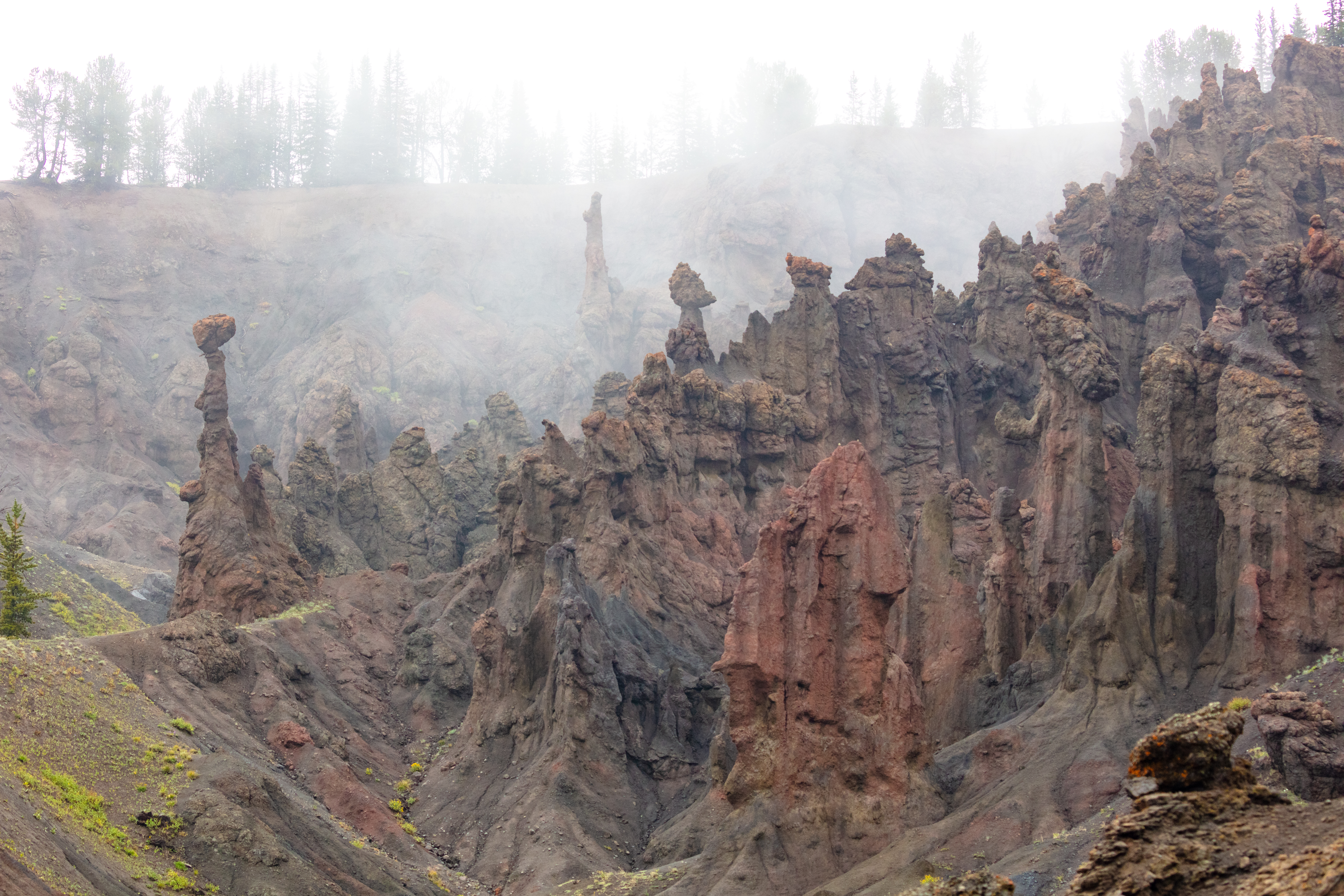
Hoodoo Basin

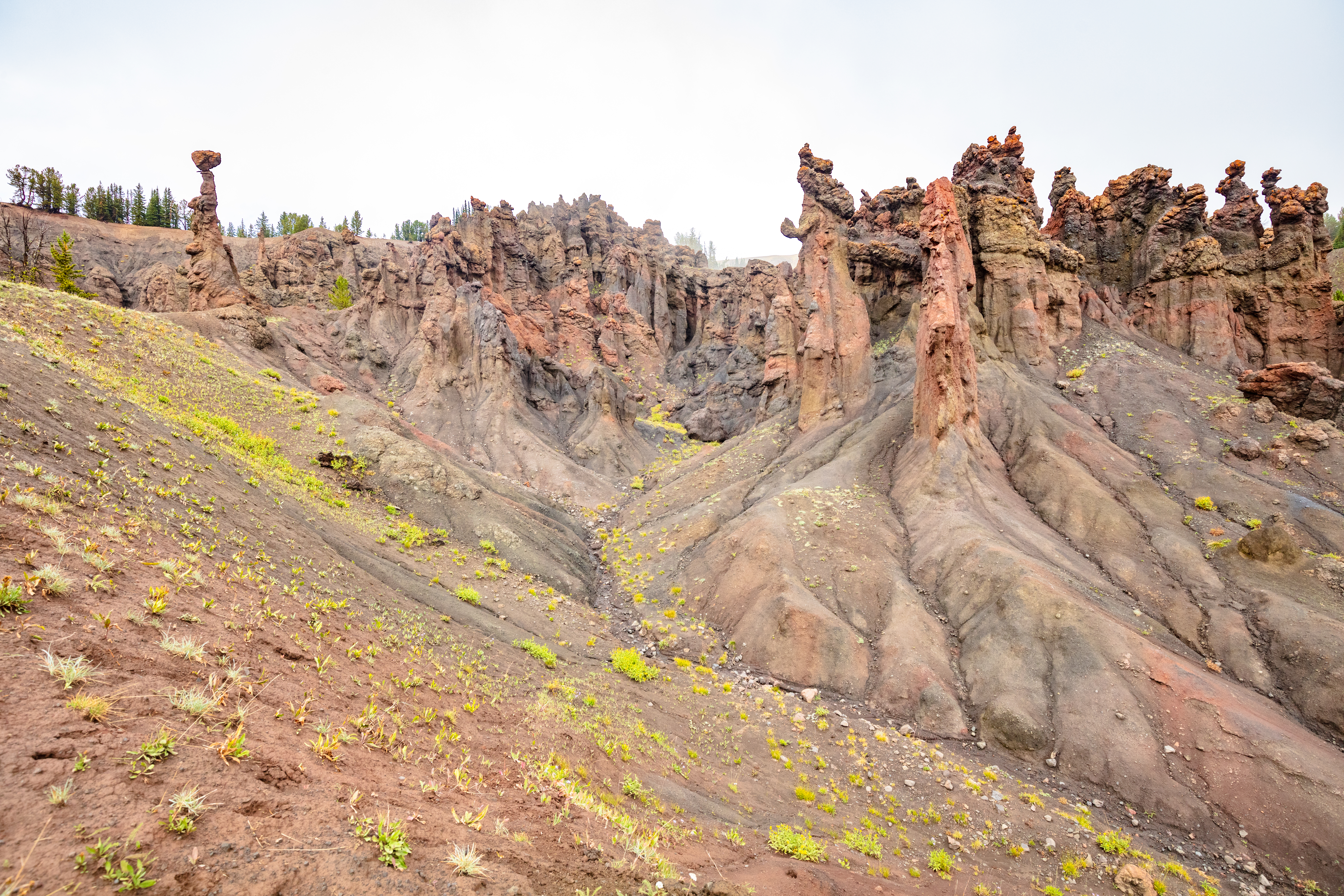
Hoodoo Basin

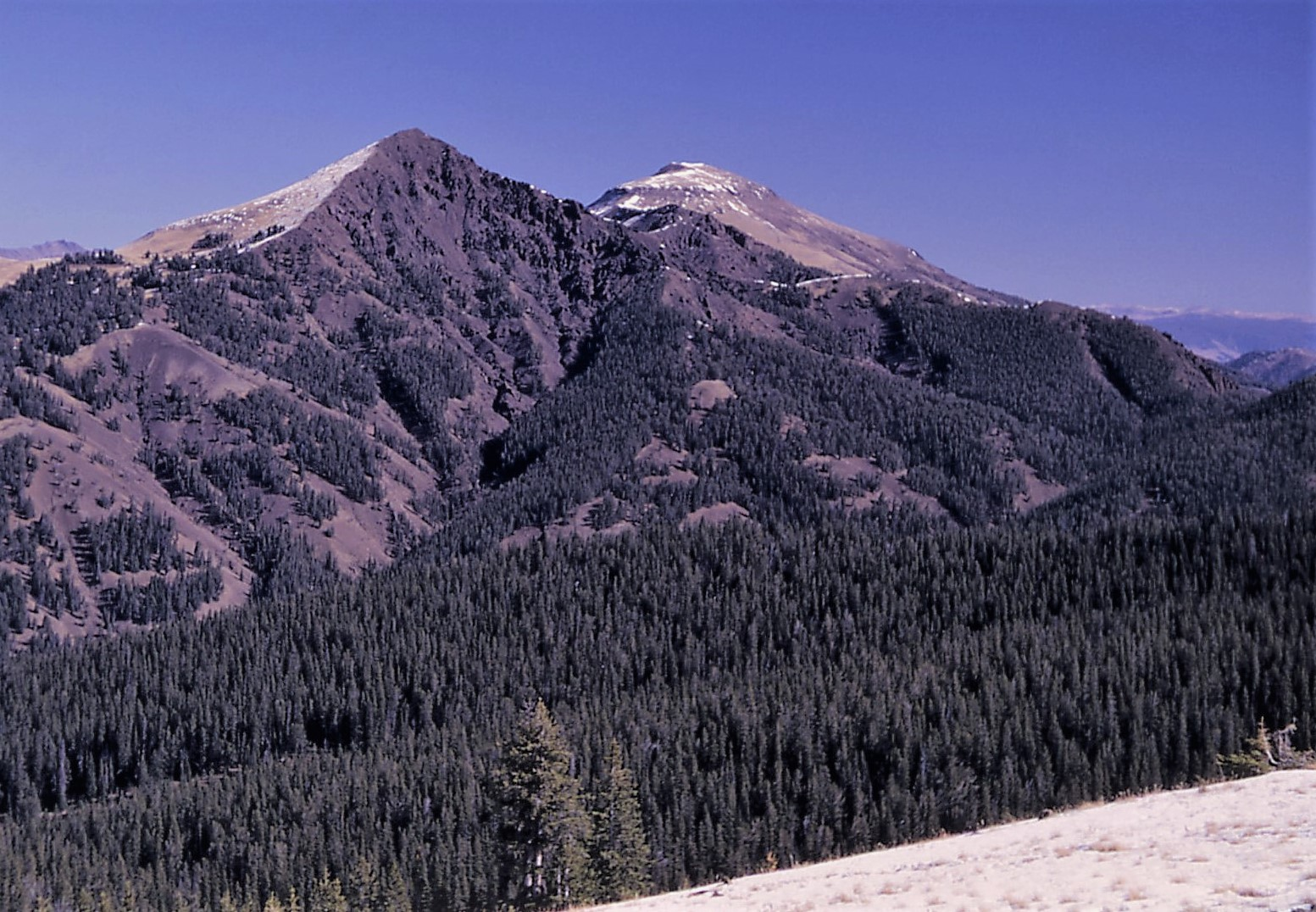
Hoodoo Peak in 1966

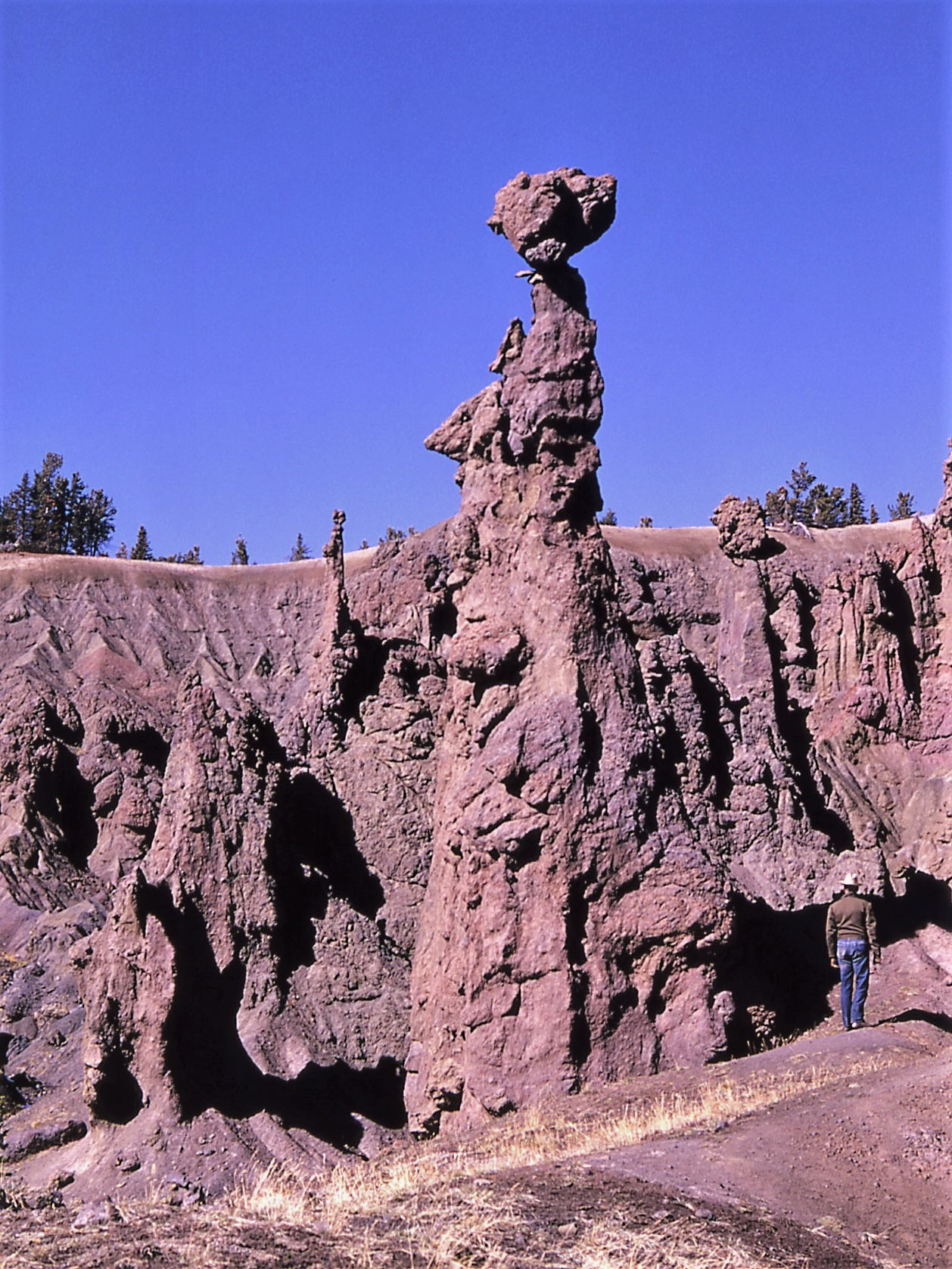
Hoodoo in Hoodoo Basin

== See also ==
- List of mountains and mountain ranges of Yellowstone National Park
