= Mount Haynes =

Mountain in Wyoming, United States

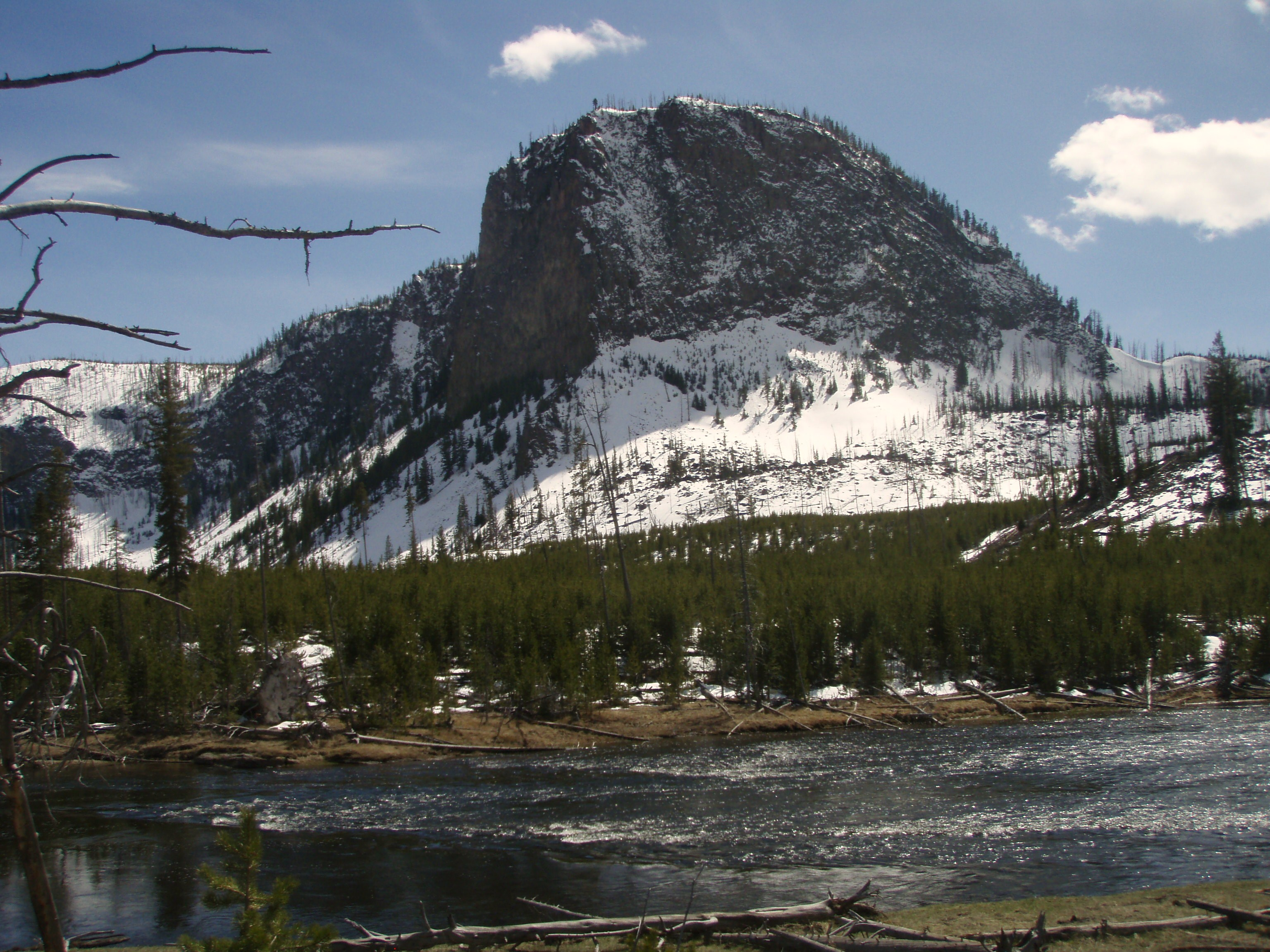
- Mount Haynes, 2009

Highest point
- Elevation: 8,235 ft (2,510 m) NAVD 88
- Coordinates: 44°37′58″N 110°56′46″W

Geography
- Location within Wyoming
- Location: Yellowstone National Park, Teton County, Wyoming, U.S.
- Parent range: Gallatin Range
- Topo map: Mount Jackson

Mount Haynes el. 8,218 feet (2,505 m) is a prominent peak adjacent to the Madison River in Yellowstone National Park. The peak was named by then Yellowstone superintendent Horace Albright to honor Frank Jay Haynes (1853–1921), the first official photographer of the park. Prior to being named Mount Haynes, the peak was unofficially called Mount Burley for D. E. Burley of the Union Pacific Railroad. Today there is an interpretive overlook along the Madison River just opposite the peak.

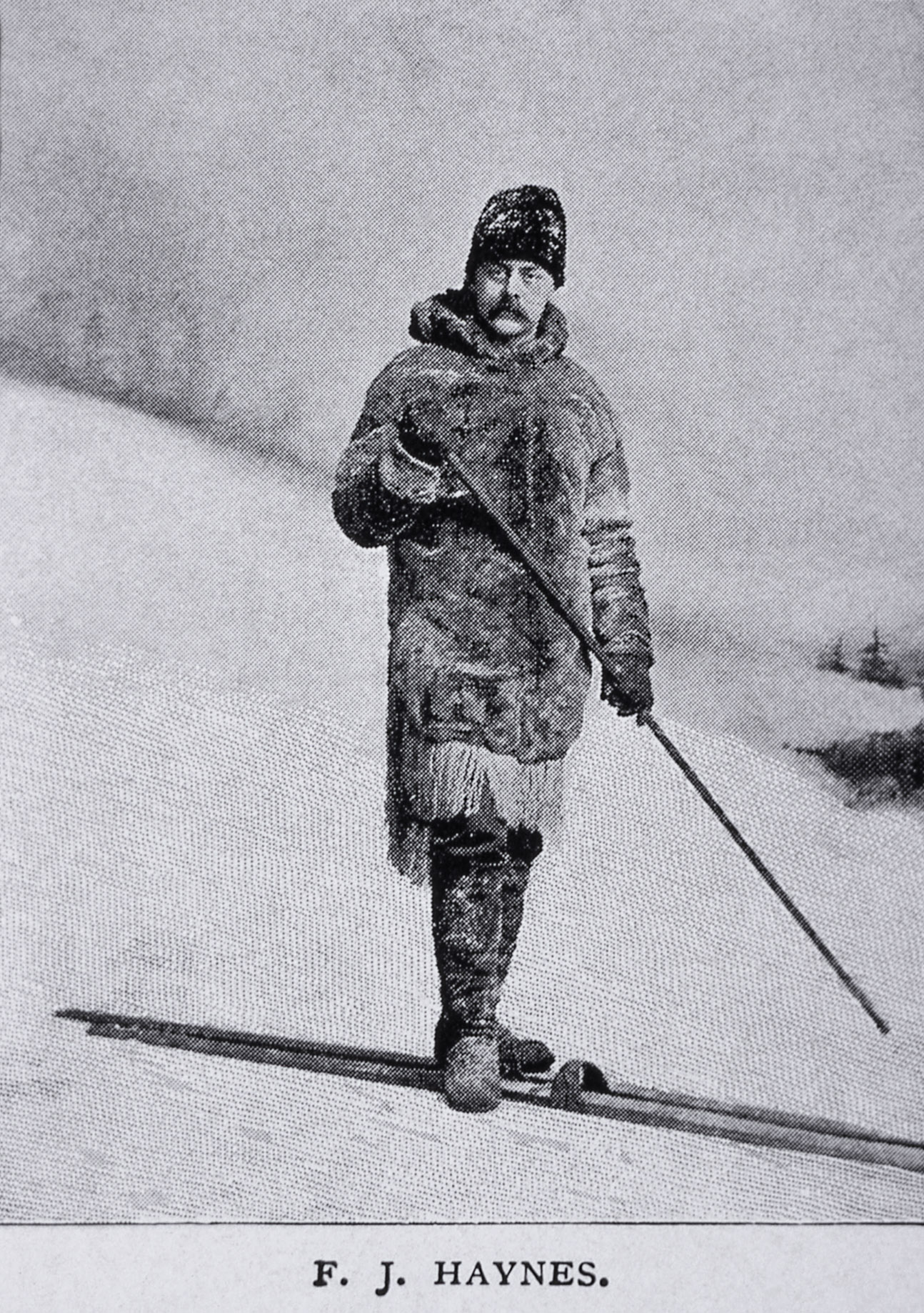
Mount Haynes namesake, Frank Jay Haynes

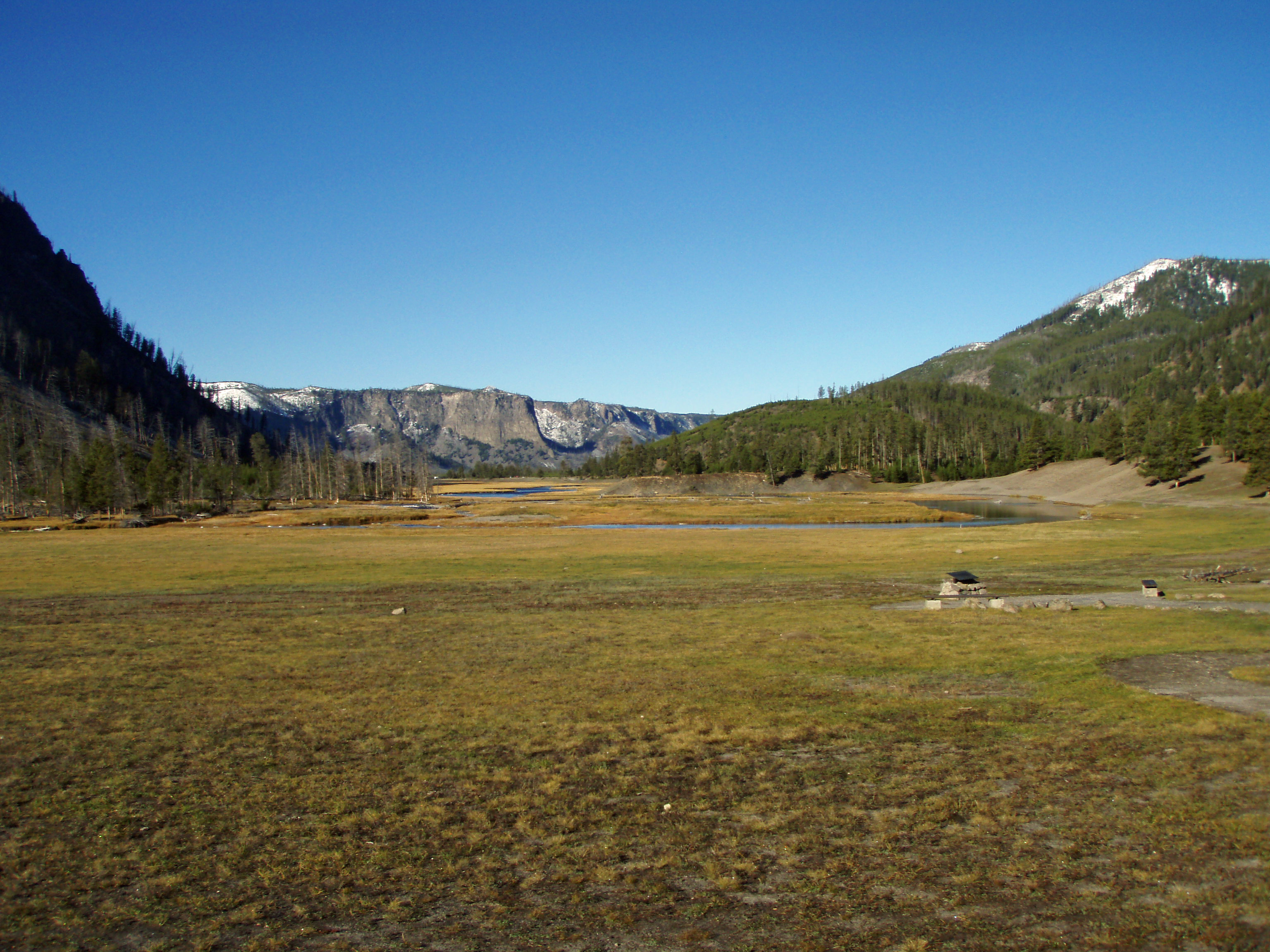
National Park Meadow with Mount Haynes on the horizon

== See also ==
- Mountains and mountain ranges of Yellowstone National Park
