= Echo Mountain (disambiguation) =

Echo Mountain may refer to:

- Echo Mountain, a mountain in California
- Echo Mountain (Colorado), a mountain summit in Colorado
- Echo Mountain (ski area), a ski area in Colorado
- Echo Mountain (album), an album by K's Choice
- Echo Mountain Recording, a professional recording studio in Asheville, NC

== See also ==
- Ekho Mountain
- Echo Peak (disambiguation)
