= Antler Peak (Wyoming) =

Mountain in Wyoming, United States

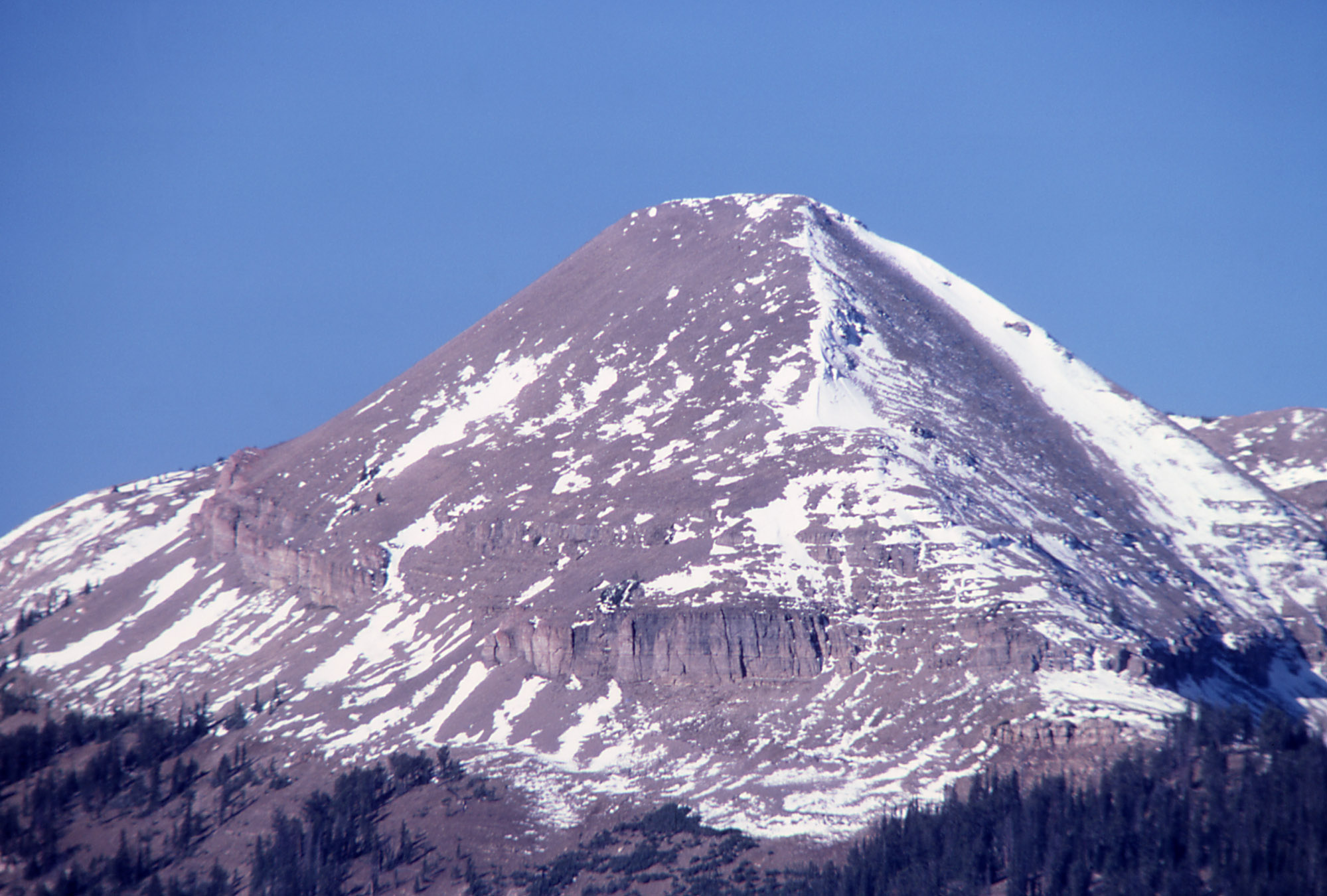
- Antler Peak from the northwest

Highest point
- Elevation: 10,063 ft (3,067 m)
- Prominence: 943 ft (287 m)
- Listing: List of mountains in the United States
- Coordinates: 44°52′07″N 110°50′11″W

Geography
- Location within Wyoming
- Location: Yellowstone National Park, Park County, Wyoming, U.S.
- Parent range: Gallatin Range
- Topo map: Mount Holmes

Antler Peak, el. 10,063 feet (3,067 m) is a prominent mountain peak in the Gallatin Range in Yellowstone National Park. The peak was originally named Bell's Peak in honor of an Assistant Secretary of the Interior by either Philetus Norris, the second park superintendent or W.H.Holmes, a U.S. Geological Survey geologist in 1878. However, in 1885, Arnold Hague of the U.S. Geological Survey renamed the peak Antler Peak because of the numerous shed elk and deer antlers found on its slopes.

Although Antler Peak is clearly visible from the Grand Loop Road as it passes through Swan Lake Flats and the Indian Creek area, there are no maintained trails to the summit. The Bighorn Pass Trail, with its trailhead at Indian Creek passes approximately 2 miles (3 km) north of the peak.

Images of Antler Peak
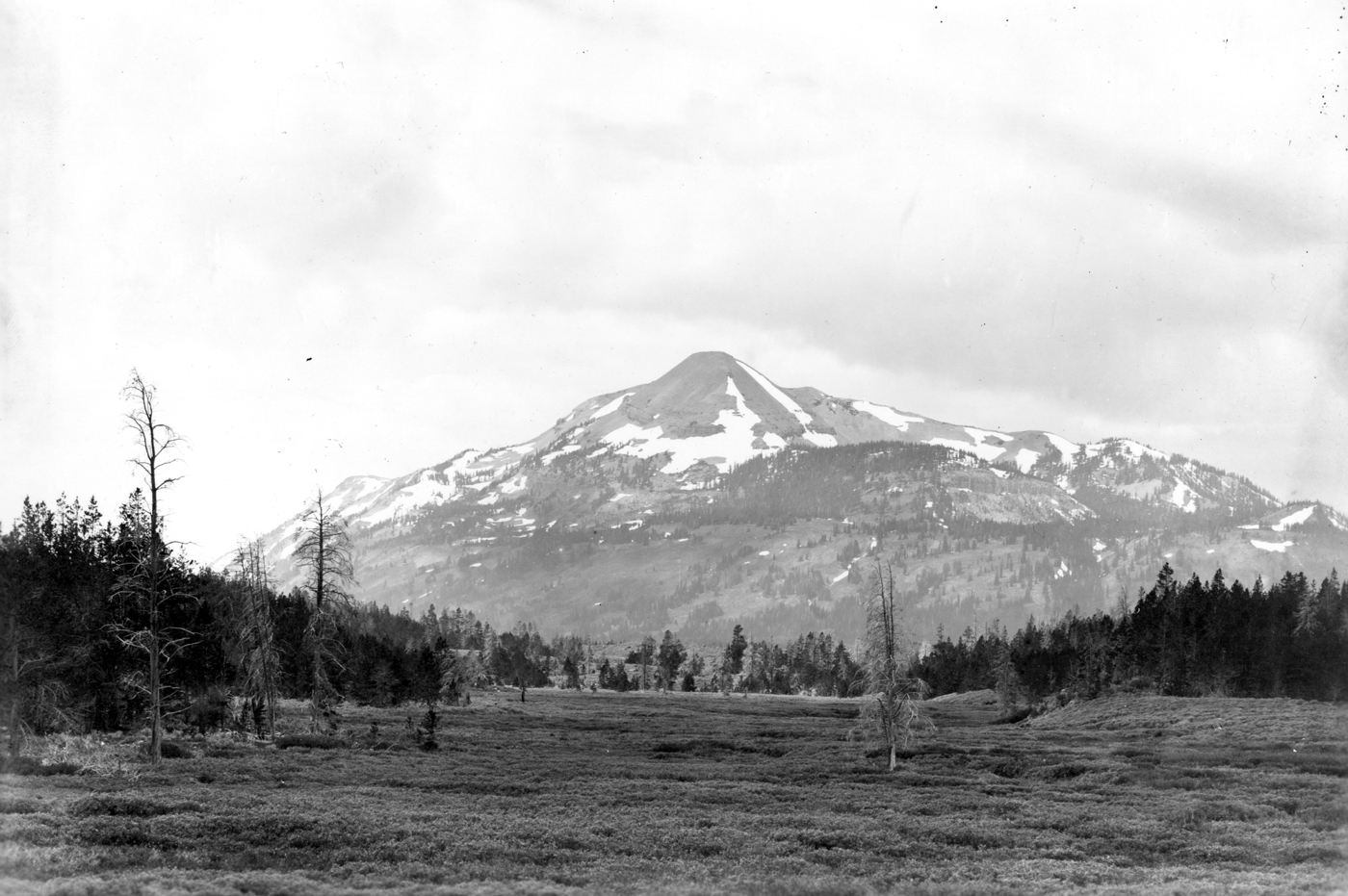
Antler Peak from Indian Creek, ca 1890

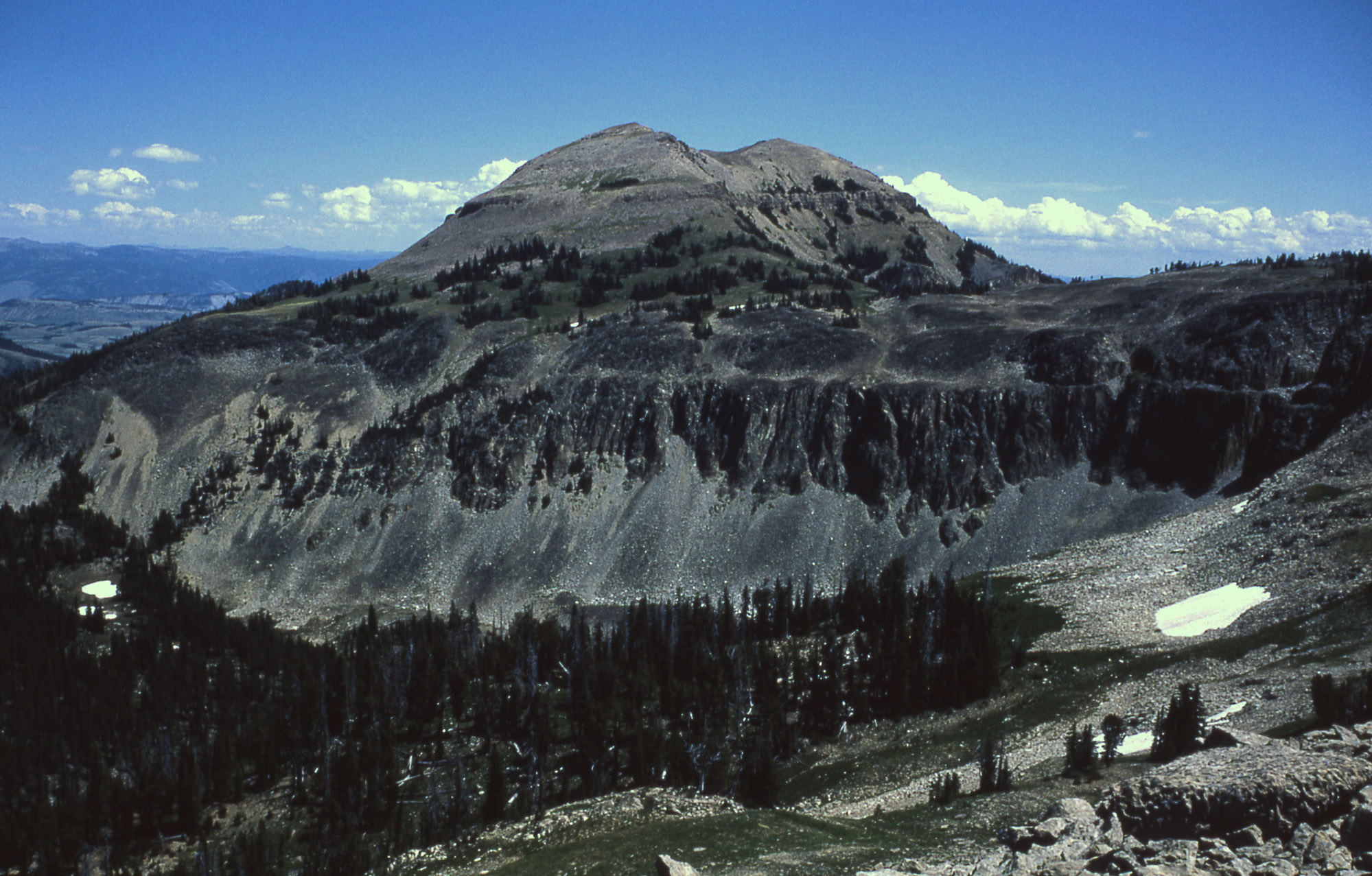
Antler Peak, 1964

== See also ==
- Mountains and mountain ranges of Yellowstone National Park
