= White Peaks =

Mountains in Wyoming, United States

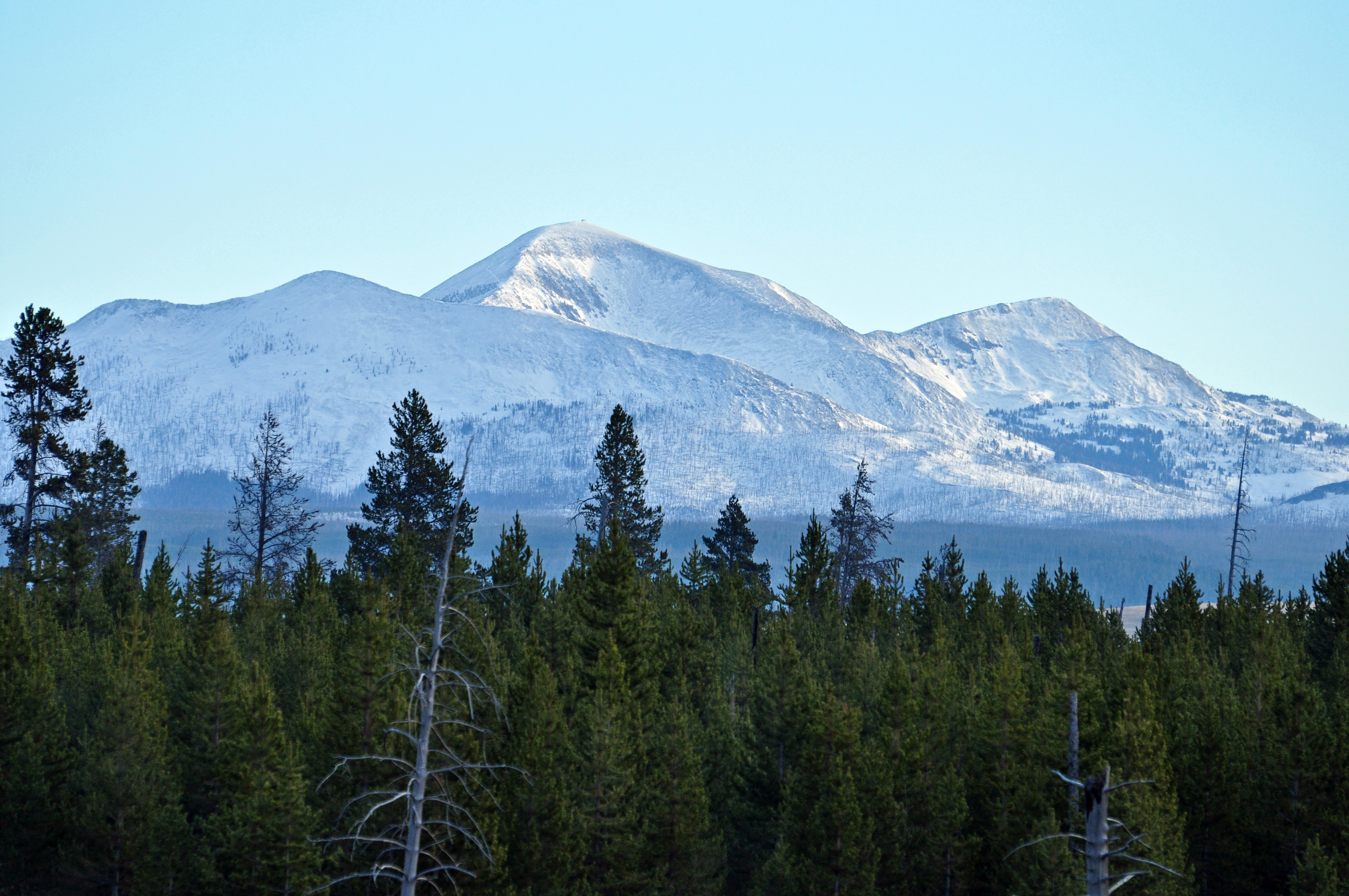
- White Peaks (foreground left) of Mount Holmes from the Madison River

Highest point
- Elevation: 9,472 ft (2,887 m)
- Coordinates: 44°48′52″N 110°52′25″W

Geography
- Location: Yellowstone National Park, Park County, Montana
- Parent range: Gallatin Range

White Peaks el. 9,472 feet (2,887 m) is a small group of mountain peaks in the southern section of the Gallatin Range in Yellowstone National Park.

== See also ==
- Mountains and mountain ranges of Yellowstone National Park
