= Douglas Knob =

Mountain in Wyoming, United States

- Location within Wyoming

Highest point
- Elevation: 8,507 ft (2,593 m)
- Coordinates: 44°18′48″N 110°50′51″W

Geography
- Location: Yellowstone National Park, Teton County, Wyoming
- Parent range: Madison Plateau
- Topo map: Shoshone Geyser Basin

Douglas Knob el. 8,507 feet (2,593 m) is an isolated mountain peak in the southwest section of Yellowstone National Park. Located just east of the Littler Fork of the Bechler River at the southern extent of the Madison Plateau, Douglas Knob is named for Joseph O. Douglas. In 1962, then Assistant Chief Ranger, William S. Chapman named the summit for Douglas who was an early Park Ranger. In 1921, Douglas was the Assistant Chief Ranger as well as the park's chief Buffalo Keeper. The summit is less than .25 miles (0.40 km) east of the Bechler River trail.

== See also ==
- Mountains and mountain ranges of Yellowstone National Park
