= Trilobite Point =

Mountain in Montana, United States

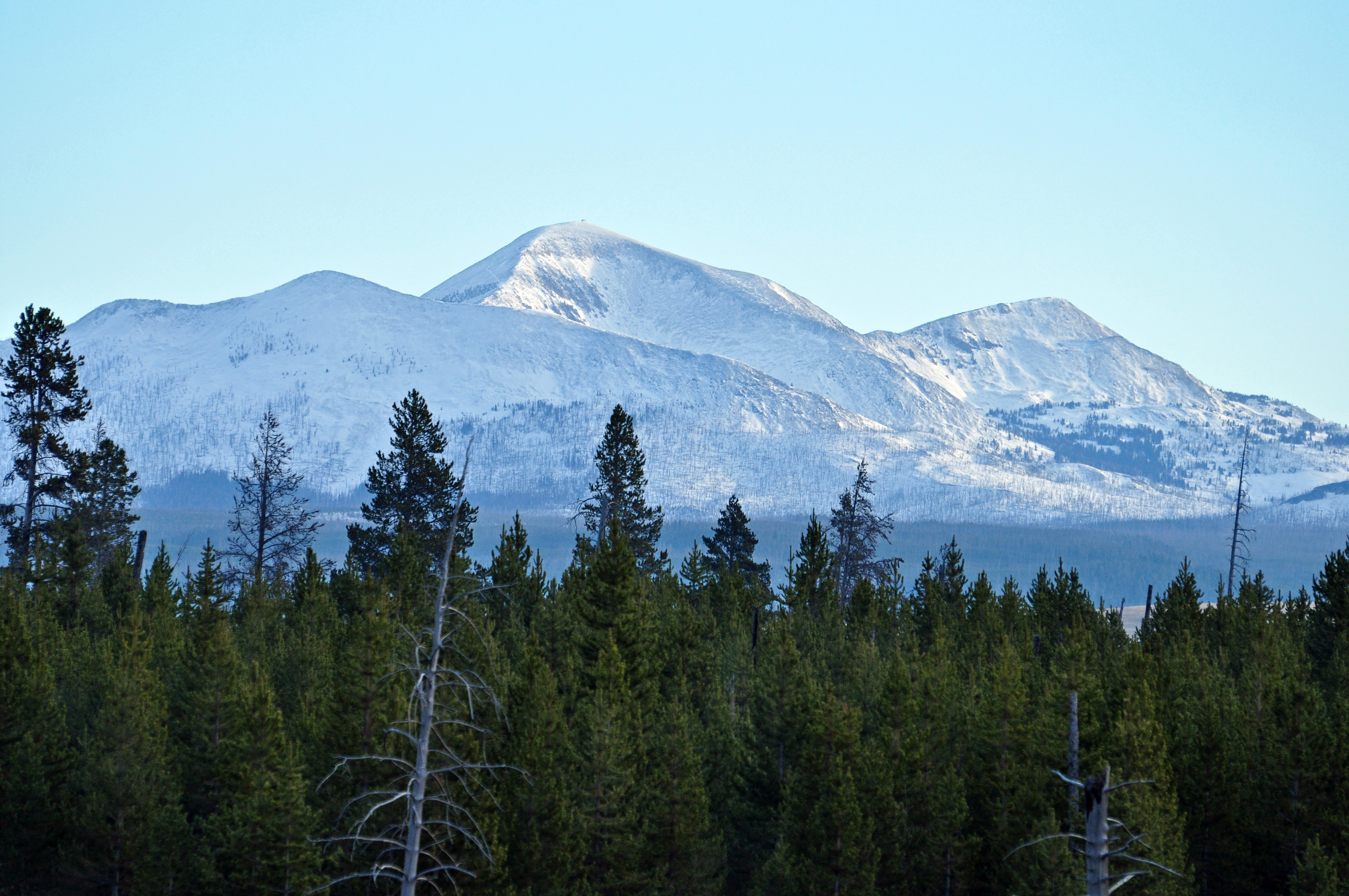
- Trilobite Point (right of Mount Holmes) from Madison River

Highest point
- Elevation: 10,010 ft (3,050 m)
- Coordinates: 44°49′01″N 110°50′38″W

Geography
- Location: Yellowstone National Park, Park County, Montana
- Parent range: Gallatin Range

Trilobite Point is a mountain peak in the southern section of the Gallatin Range in Yellowstone National Park. It has an elevation of 10,010 feet (3,050 m). In 1883, William Henry Holmes of the Hayden expedition named it after trilobite-bearing exposures of Cambrian sedimentary strata that he found just below its summit and around it.

== Geology ==
Location in the southern Gallatin Range

The summit of Trilobite Point consists of an erosional outlier of the unfossiliferous cherty dolomites of the Ordovician Bighorn Dolomite. Underlying the Bighorn Dolomite and exposed in steep slopes, from youngest to oldest, are the Cambrian limestones, dolomites, shales, and sandstones of the Snowy Range Formation, Pilgrim Limestone, Park Shale, Meagher Formation, Wolsey Shale, and Flathead Sandstone. The Flathead Sandstone is underlain by Precambrian metamorphic rocks. These strata are intruded by two, thin rhyodacite porphyry sills. A third, thicker rhyodacite porphyry sill separates the Flathead Sandstone from the underlying gneissic metamorphic rocks.

== Fossils ==
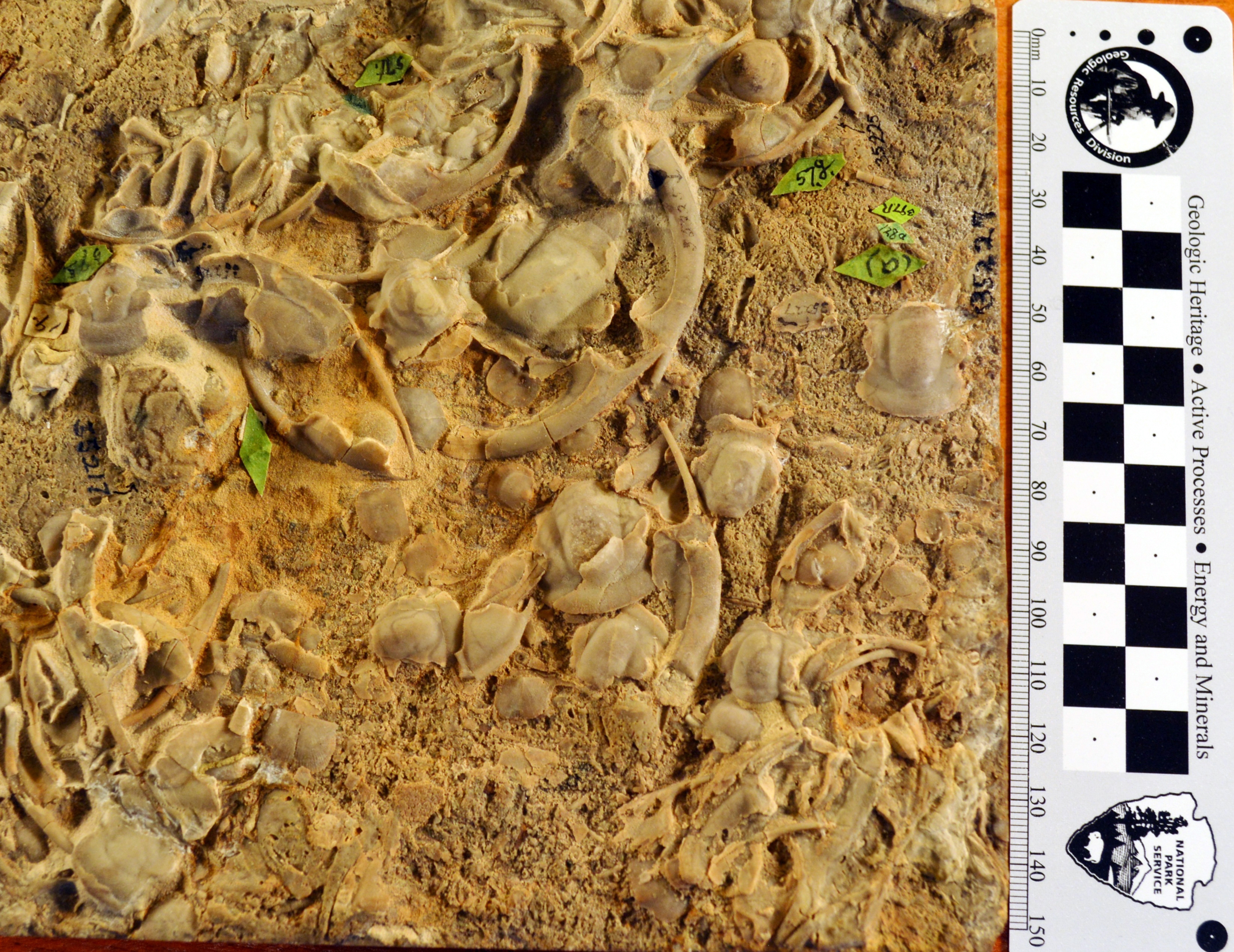
Fossil hash composed of the Cambrian trilobite Wilbernia walcotti from Snowy Range Formation, Yellowstone National Park

The most fossiliferous of these geologic formations is the Pilgrim Limestone. Abundant trilobite fragments have been observed, often as a fossil hash, as discrete beds in its lower and middle parts. Within Yellowstone National Park, the Pilgrim Limestone has yielded fossils of the enigmatic Chancelloria, hyoliths, brachiopods, trilobites, and conodonts. One of Walcott’s trilobites, Solenopleura? weedi, is now attributed to the Pilgrim Limestone. Cambrian sponge spicules, hyoliths, brachiopods, trilobites, crinoid fragment, and invertebrate trace fossils have been collected from 11 outcrops within the vicinity of Trilobite Point.

== Hebgen Lake earthquake of August 17, 1959 ==
During Hebgen Lake earthquake of August 17, 1959, the fire lookout on Mount Holmes reported that a crack opened across the ridge between Mount Holmes and Trilobite Point. It was not determined whether it was a either a small fault scarp caused by vertical displacement along a bedrock fault or the result of slumping in unconsolidated regolith.

== See also ==
- Mountains and mountain ranges of Yellowstone National Park
