= Three Rivers Peak =

Mountain in Wyoming, United States

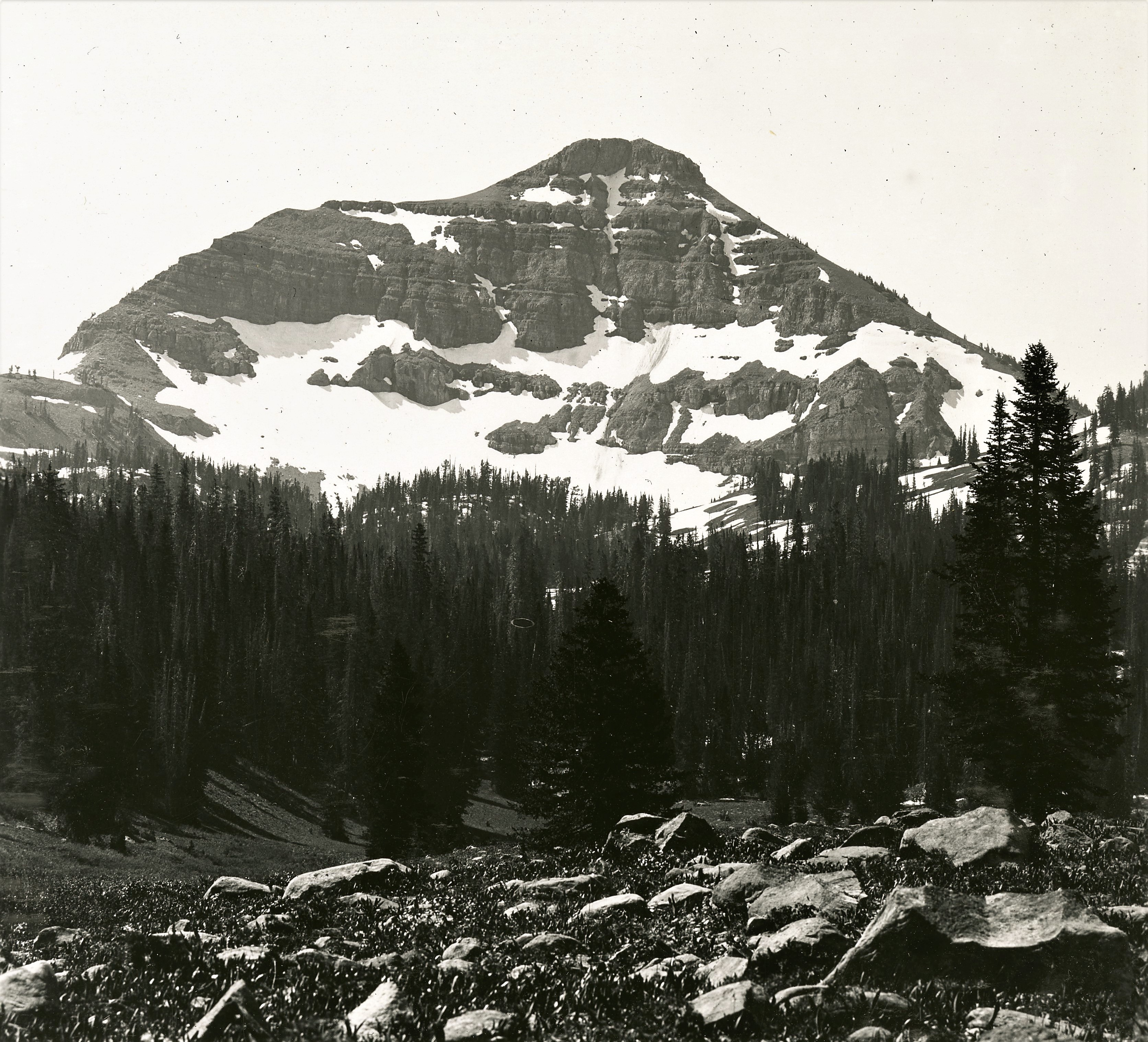
- North aspect, circa 1890

Highest point
- Elevation: 9,958 ft (3,035 m)
- Prominence: 858 ft (262 m)
- Isolation: 1.84 mi (2.96 km)
- Coordinates: 44°51′01″N 110°53′00″W

Geography
- Location within Wyoming Location within the United States
- Location: Yellowstone National Park; Park County, Wyoming
- Parent range: Gallatin Range
- Topo map: USGS Three Rivers Peak

Three Rivers Peak is a 9,958-foot (3,035 m) mountain summit in the southern section of the Gallatin Range in Yellowstone National Park, in the U.S. state of Wyoming. The peak is loosely connected to Crowfoot Ridge, and Lake Gallatin lies at its foot.

== History ==
Film photographs of Three Rivers and surrounding peaks in Yellowstone were taken by Joseph P. Iddings for the United States Geological Survey in 1890. Explorers to the area recounted seeing 150 elk at the foot of the mountain, publishing details of their journey in The Land of Sunshine magazine in 1901.

== Climate ==
According to the Köppen climate classification system, it is located in a subarctic climate zone with long, cold, snowy winters, and cool to warm summers. Winter temperatures can drop below −10 °F with wind chill factors below −30 °F.

== Gallery ==
Film photograph by Joseph P. Iddings (1890)

Location in the southern Gallatin Range of northern Wyoming

== See also ==
- Mountains and mountain ranges of Yellowstone National Park
