= Meridian Peak (Montana) =

Mountain in the American state of Montana

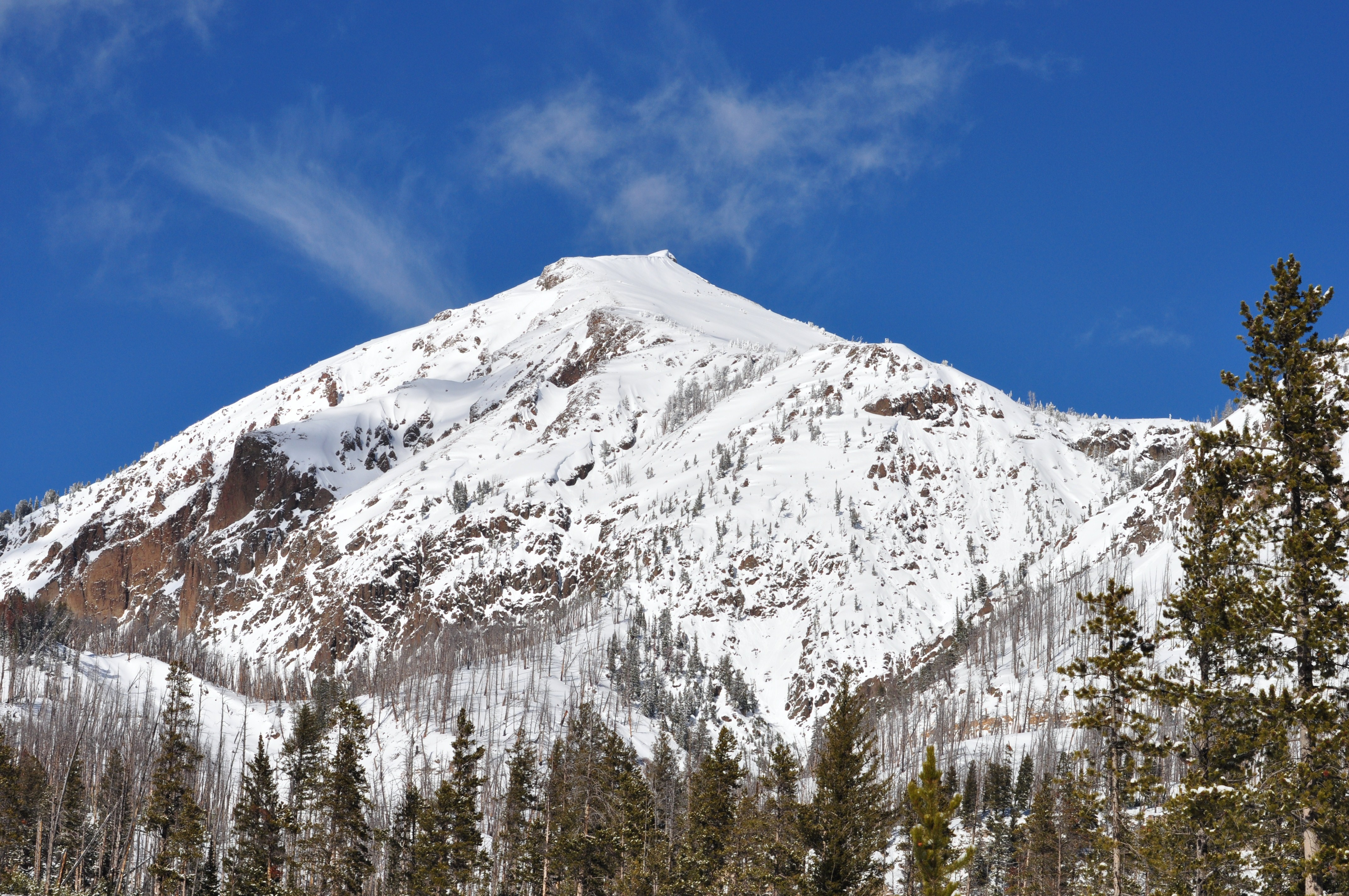
- Meridian Peak

Highest point
- Elevation: 10,466 ft (3,190 m)
- Coordinates: 45°01′38″N 110°00′09″W

Geography
- Location within Montana
- Location: Montana, U.S.
- Parent range: Absaroka Range
- Topo map: USGS Cutoff Mountain

Meridian Peak is a mountain in the Absaroka Range in the state of Montana, United States. It has an elevation of 10,466 feet (3,190 m) and is located in Park County, Montana. The mountain is included in Yellowstone National Park.

== Etymology ==
According to the United States Geological Survey, the name variation Meridan Peak is due to a misspelling.
