= Echo Peak (Wyoming) =

Mountain in Wyoming, United States

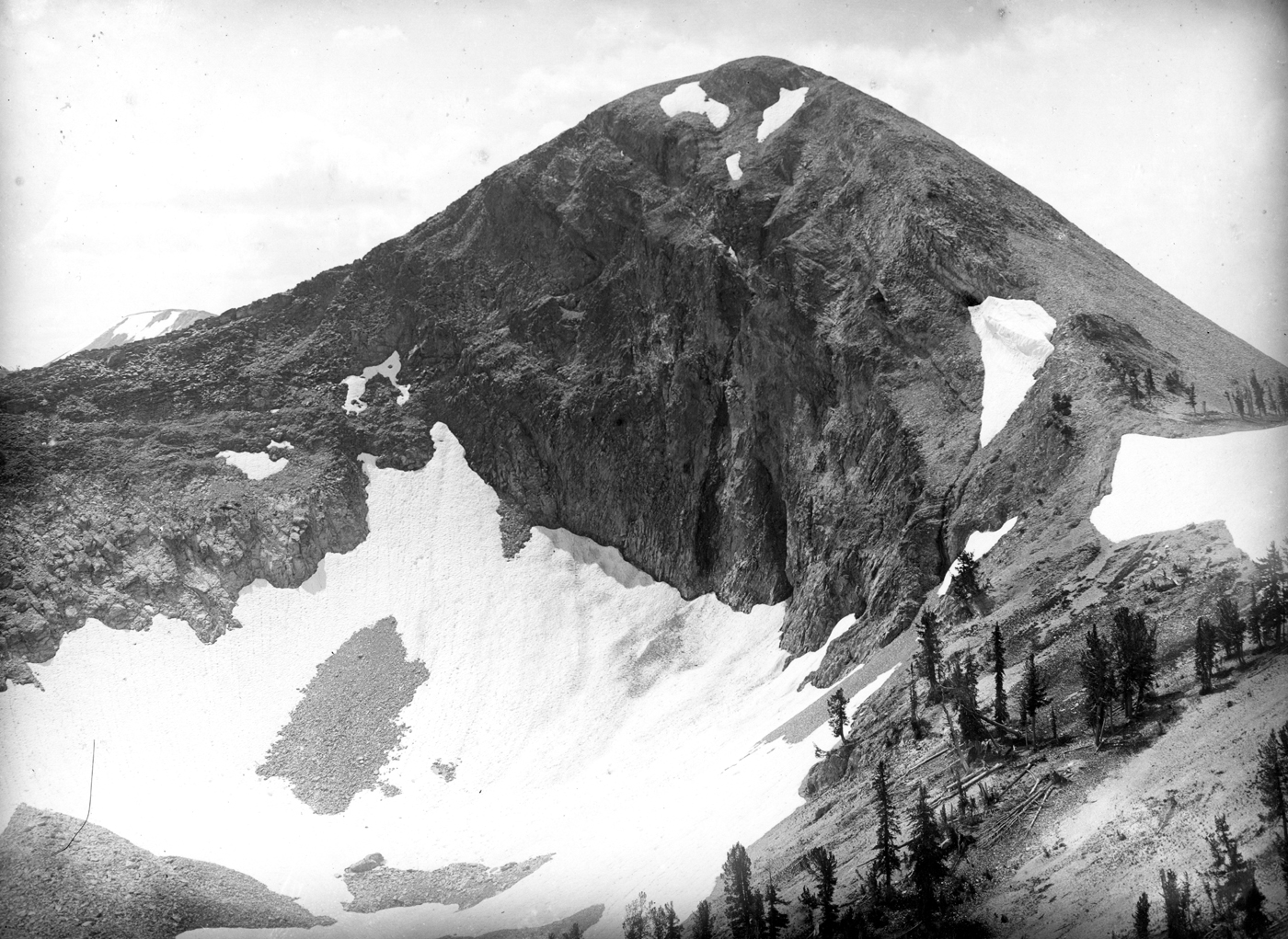
- Film photograph by Joseph P. Iddings c. 1890

Highest point
- Elevation: 9,570 ft (2,920 m)
- Coordinates: 44°50′52″N 110°52′59″W

Geography
- Location within Montana
- Location: Yellowstone National Park, Park County, Wyoming
- Parent range: Gallatin Range

Echo Peak, elevation 9,570 feet (2,920 m), is a mountain peak in the southern section of the Gallatin Range in Yellowstone National Park, in the U.S. state of Wyoming.

Location in the southern Gallatin Range

Echo Peak is so named because of its remarkable echo.

== See also ==
- Mountains and mountain ranges of Yellowstone National Park
