= Prospect Peak (Park County, Wyoming) =

Mountain in Wyoming, United States

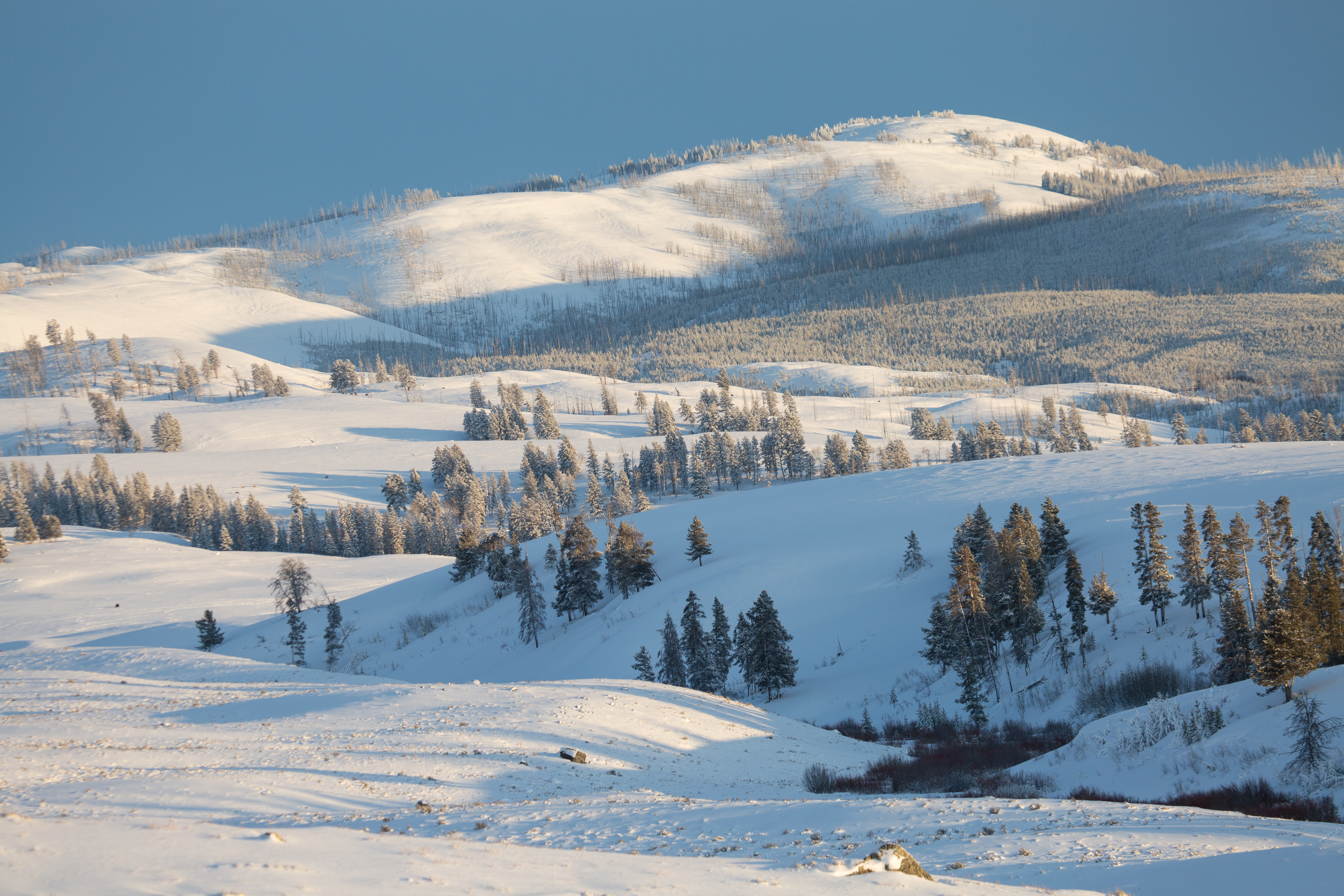
- Winter sunset on Prospect Peak

Highest point
- Elevation: 9,527 ft (2,904 m)
- Coordinates: 44°53′17″N 110°30′10″W

Geography
- Location within Wyoming Location within the United States
- Location: Yellowstone National Park; Park County, Wyoming, US
- Parent range: Washburn Range
- Topo map: USGS Blacktail Deer Creek

Prospect Peak el. 9,527 feet (2,904 m) is a mountain peak in the Washburn Range of Yellowstone National Park. The summit is located approximately 6 miles (9.7 km) west southwest of Tower Junction. Between 1883 and 1885, members of the Arnold Hague Geological Surveys named the peak Surprise Peak for reasons not now known. In 1880, then superintendent Philetus Norris had named the peak Mount Stephans for one of his assistants, C. N. Stephans. However, in 1885 Arnold Hague, for reasons again not known today, gave the peak its present name—Prospect Peak. The USGS has also mapped this summit as Mount Stephens. and also cited Surprise Peak as an alternate name.

== See also ==
- Mountains and mountain ranges of Yellowstone National Park
