= Nez Perce flight through Yellowstone =

1877 flight of native American group

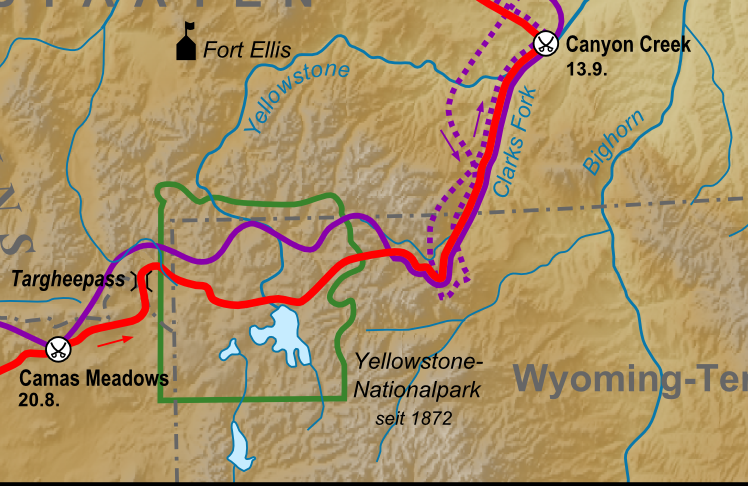
A map of the route of the Nez Perce (red) and General Howard (purple) across Yellowstone National Park and vicinity. The dotted purple line shows the route of Colonel Sturgis.

The Nez Perce Native Americans fled through Yellowstone National Park between August 20 and Sept 7, during the Nez Perce War in 1877. As the U.S. army pursued the Nez Perce through the park, a number of hostile and sometimes deadly encounters between park visitors and the Indians occurred. Eventually, the army's pursuit forced the Nez Perce off the Yellowstone plateau and into forces arrayed to capture or destroy them when they emerged from the mountains of Yellowstone onto the valley of Clark's Fork of the Yellowstone River.

== Background ==
In June 1877, several bands of the Nez Perce, numbering about 750 men, women, and children and resisting relocation from their native lands on the Wallowa River in northeast Oregon to a reservation in west-central Idaho on the Clearwater river, attempted to escape to the east through Idaho, Montana and Wyoming over the Rocky Mountains into the Great Plains. By late August, the Nez Perce had travelled hundreds of miles and fought several battles in which they defeated or held off the U.S. army forces pursuing them. The Nez Perce had the mistaken notion that after crossing the next mountain range or defeating the latest army sent to oppose them they would find a peaceful new home.

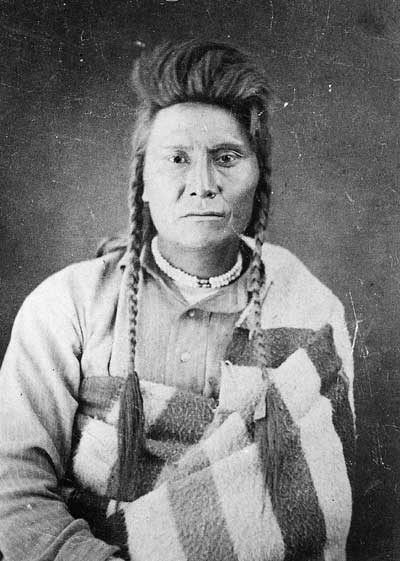
The Nez Perce leader Chief Joseph in 1877.

The Nez Perce War was extensively reported in the nation's press. The fighting retreat of the Nez Perce had made their leader Chief Joseph something of a national hero and a military genius in the eyes of many in the American public. On August 9, 1877, the Nez Perce engaged the U.S. Army under the command of Colonel John Gibbon at the Battle of the Big Hole near the headwaters of the West fork of the Big Hole River in Montana. By all accounts, this battle was a draw with heavy casualties on both sides, but the Nez Perce escaped to the south and into Idaho. General Oliver O. Howard's force, just a day's ride to the west from the Big Hole encounter, pursued the Nez Perce into Idaho. The Army was embarrassed by its failure to defeat the Nez Perce.

=== Into the Yellowstone ===
On August 20, 1877, the Nez Perce and the U.S. Army engaged again at the Battle of Camas Creek just west of Henrys Lake, Idaho. The Nez Perce raided a camp of soldiers, stealing mostly mules and a few horses and supplies. The ensuing fight lasted a full day, but resulted in few casualties. On the evening of the 20th, the Nez Perce headed east, crossed Red Rock Pass leaving Idaho into Montana then entering Yellowstone National Park and Wyoming near the present-day west entrance 44°39′44″N 111°06′15″W on August 23, 1877. General Howard's Bannock scouts and White scout Stanton G. Fisher followed the Nez Perce a day behind. They reported back to Howard and he predicted correctly that the Nez Perce's objective was to cross the Yellowstone plateau and then head for the Crow agency on the Yellowstone River. Howard's command was exhausted and did not immediately pursue the Nez Perce into the park, electing to remain in the vicinity of Henry's Lake to regroup.

While Howard with 600 men took up the pursuit of the Nez Perce again on August 27, after resting his soldiers for four days at Henrys Lake, his superior, General William Tecumseh Sherman, was laying a trap for the Nez Perce when they emerged from Yellowstone Park. Lt. Gustavus C. Doane and about 100 men plus Crow scouts was dispatched to guard the north entrance of Yellowstone Park at Mammoth Hot Springs. Colonel Samuel D. Sturgis and 360 men would guard the Clarks Fork on the east. Major Hart with 250 cavalry and 100 Indian scouts was to guard the Shoshone River exit also on the east. To the south, Colonel Wesley Merritt with 500 men was positioned on the Wind River. To the North at Fort Keogh in Montana, Colonel Nelson Miles was standing by with a force of several hundred soldiers.

Against 2,000 soldiers plus hundreds of Indian scouts, the Nez Perce fighting men probably numbered fewer than 200. Poker Joe, one-half White and fluent in English, was their guide through Yellowstone. Their leadership was collective, drawn from each of the five bands of the tribe represented among the refugees. Looking Glass was probably the most influential war leader. Although Chief Joseph is credited with being the overall leader of the Nez Perce, his role was more focused on the management of the camp of women and children than fighting. The chiefs attempted to restrain their young men from taking revenge on White non-combatants, but not always with success.

== Hostile encounters with tourists and prospectors ==
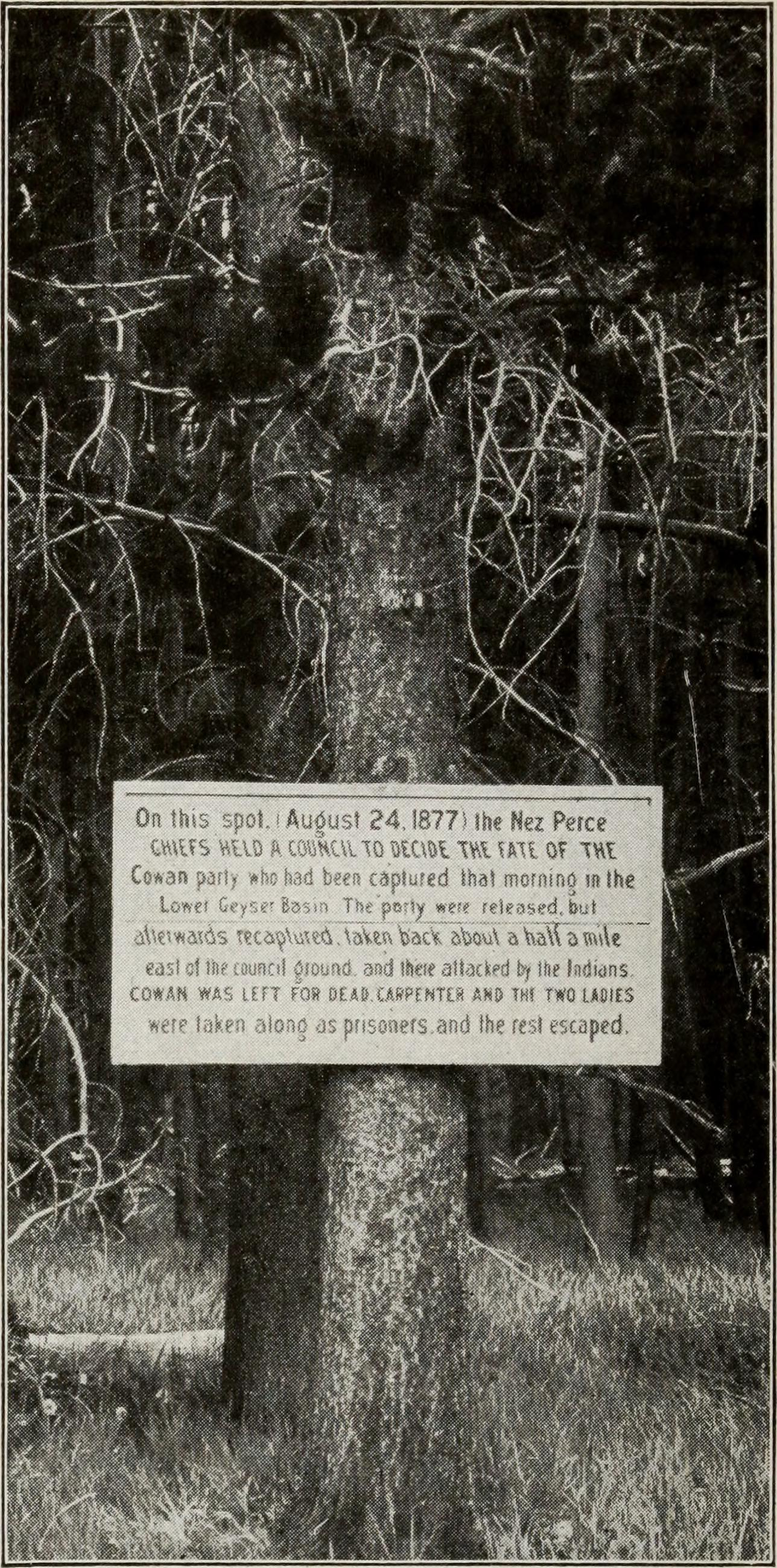
Sign detailing the encounter of the Nez Perce with the Cowan party

When the Nez Perce entered Yellowstone there were eight or nine parties of tourists totaling at least 35 persons in the park, plus several groups of prospectors. Two of these parties would experience hostile encounters with elements of the Nez Perce. The Radersburg Party as they became known, nine tourists from Radersburg, Montana had been in the park on August 23, 1877, for eight days. Made up of George F. and Emma Cowan, Emma's brother and sister, Frank and Ida Carpenter, Charles Mann and Henry Meyers, this group also included A.J. Arnold, William Dingee and Albert Oldham from Helena, Montana. They were camped just west of the Lower Geyser Basin. General Sherman himself had been in the park as a tourist only a few days before. His scout reportedly assured members of the Radersburg party that they would be perfectly safe from the Nez Perce. However, one of the tourists, Emma Cowan, noted that the Sherman party "preferred being elsewhere, as they left...that same night."

A second group of tourists, made up of entirely young men became known as the Helena party. On the evening the August 23, Andrew Weikert, Richard Dietrich, Charles Kenck, Frederick Pfister, Jack Stewart, Leonard Duncan, Joseph Roberts, August Foller, Leslie Wilke and an African American cook named Benjamin Stone were in camp at Yellowstone Falls. Not far from the Radersburg party were John Shively, a lone prospector, James Irwin, a recently discharged soldier, and a dishevelled lone tourist encountered on the Yellowstone river near Mount Washburn was "Texas Jack" (John Omohondro), a scout with a small party of English tourists.

=== Encounter with the Radersburg party ===
After entering the park, the band of Nez Perce moved up the Madison and Firehole Rivers to the Lower Geyser Basin near Fountain Flats. A small scouting party of Nez Perce led by Yellow Wolf led the way. In the late afternoon of August 23, Yellow Wolf's scouts captured John Shively at the confluence of the East Fork of the Firehole River (Nez Perce Creek) 44°34′50″N 110°49′57″W and the Firehole River. They forced him to act as a guide for the Nez Perce through Yellowstone. On the morning of August 24, Yellow Wolf's scouting party rode into the Radersburg party camp and forced the group to accompany them up the Mary Mountain trail east toward the Yellowstone River to the main Nez Perce camp. By noon, upon the advice of Poker Joe, the Nez Perce chiefs decided to allow the party to leave and head west out of the park, but only on the condition that they abandon all their supplies and horses to the Nez Perce, which they did. About 30 minutes after they were released and on their way west down the edges of the Mary Mountain trail, the party encountered a group of 20-30 Nez Perce stragglers who wanted to return the tourists into the hands of the chiefs. Shooting erupted, George Cowan was shot point blank in the head and Albert Oldham suffered a painful face wound. The remainder of the party was unhurt and scattered into the forest to the north. Upon learning of the encounter, a Nez Perce chief came to the rescue of several of the tourists. Frank Carpenter, Ida Carpenter and Emma Cowan were returned to the Nez Perce camp and given the protection of Chief Joseph. On August 25, the Nez Perce continued east to Trout Creek on the Yellowstone river in what is today known as Hayden Valley. By late afternoon on the 25th, the Nez Perce has crossed the Yellowstone near Mud Volcano at what became known as Nez Perce Ford44°37′05″N 110°25′01″W. During the day Nez Perce scouts encountered James Irwin hiding in a ravine and brought him into their camp as well. On the evening of August 25, the Nez Perce released the Carpenters, and Emma Cowan giving them two horses. They safely made their way north where they found protection from elements of Lt. Doane's 2nd cavalry near Mount Washburn. James Irwin and John Shively remained as guides for the Nez Perce. Over the next couple of days, other members of the Radersburg party made their way out of the park via the Madison River and into the safety of General Howard's forces at Henry's Lake. On August 30, Howard's forces, moving up the Madison river, found George Cowan and Albert Oldham alive, but in poor condition.

=== Encounter with the Helena party ===
Unfortunately for the members of the Helena party, James Irwin had disclosed the location of their camp near the forks of Otter Creek44°41′22″N 110°35′15″W while in the hands of the Nez Perce. At dawn on August 26, a Nez Perce war party found the Helena party's camp. Two of the members Weikert and Wilke had already left the camp. The Nez Perce attacked the camp with gunfire. Charles Kenck was shot dead. John Stewart was wounded in the leg and captured by the Nez Perce. The other members of the party, including Richard Dietrich, scattered into the forest. Stewart bribed his release from the Nez Perce with $263 and a silver watch. After cleaning his wounds, he made his way north out of the park. When Weikert and Wilke return to camp, they discovered the raid and immediately headed north out of the park. They also had a brief encounter with the Nez Perce war party, and Weikert sustained a shoulder wound. On August 27, the main Nez Perce force moved further east up Pelican Creek 44°33′12″N 110°21′37″W from the tourists and the army. Also on the 27th, Weikert who had already reached Mammoth Hot Springs headed south to search for Dietrich and the other members of the Helena party. By the end of the day, Dietrich and Ben Stone were safe at McCartney's Hotel and bath house at Mammoth Hot Springs. James McCartney and Weikert agreed to go back to Otter Creek to locate Kenck, Stewart and the others.

=== The burning of Henderson's ranch ===
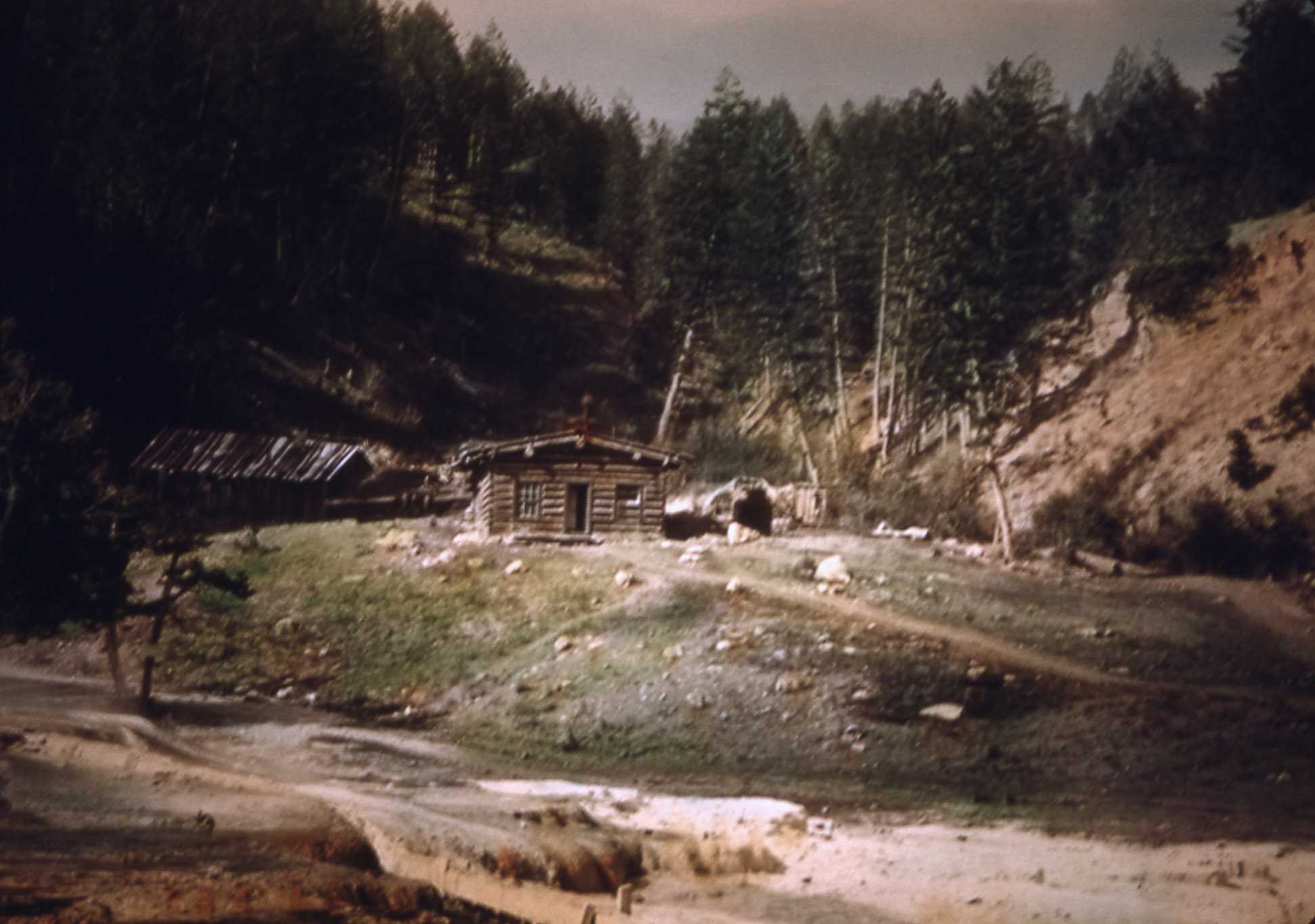
Richard Dietrich was killed in one of these buildings that made up McCartney's Hotel at Mammoth Hot Springs (ca 1871)

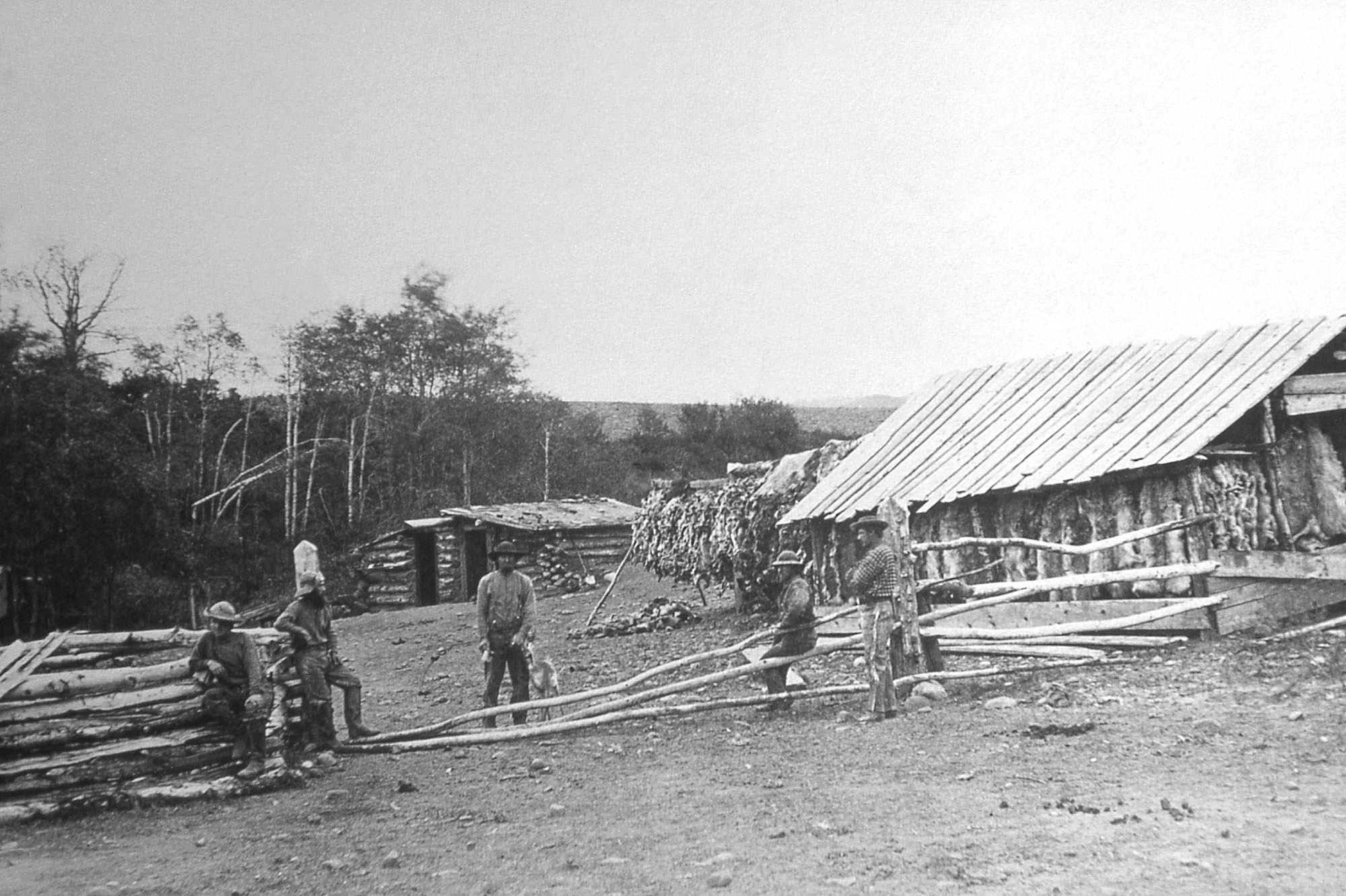
The Henderson ranch must have looked much like this in 1877. Photo of the Bottler ranch (just a few miles north of Hendersons) (ca 1871)

Unbeknownst to Weikert and McCartney as they traveled south to Otter Creek, a band of 20-30 Nez Perce were moving north toward Mammoth Hot Springs where Dietrich and Stone were staying. The Indians had already burned Baronett's Bridge (the first bridge across the Yellowstone River near its confluence with the East Fork of the Yellowstone (Lamar River) built by Jack Baronett, a trader and Yellowstone guide in 1871). The Nez Perce found Dietrich and Stone and chased them into the forest where they successfully evaded confrontation with the Indians. On the morning of August 31, the band of Nez Perce moved north of the mouth of the Gardner River45°01′46″N 110°42′03″W and attacked the Henderson Ranch which was a homestead established in 1871 a mile or so north of the park. A two-hour gunfight resulted in no casualties. Sterling Henderson and his hands abandoned the ranch for the safety of the river and the Nez Perce sacked and burned the buildings. Shortly after the attack on the ranch, a force of cavalry under the command of Lt. Doane was moving up the river near Devil's Slide45°05′32″N 110°47′59″W. They quickly engaged the Nez Perce and drove them back into the park. Unfortunately for Dietrich, believing the Nez Perce had left the Mammoth Hot Springs area took refuge in one of McCartney's buildings. As the Nez Perce fled south they found Dietrich and killed him. Wiekert and McCartney had found Charles Kenck's body at Otter Creek and buried him. Upon their return to Mammoth, they found Dietrich dead as well. Fearing that Ben Stone might be dead and Mammoth Hot Springs no longer a safe place, they made their way north into the safety of Lt. Doane's camp, where they found Ben Stone, the negro cook, safe as well. Although there were a few other skirmishes between soldiers and the Nez Perce while the Indians were still in the park, they resulted in only minor casualties.

== The Nez Perce's escape ==
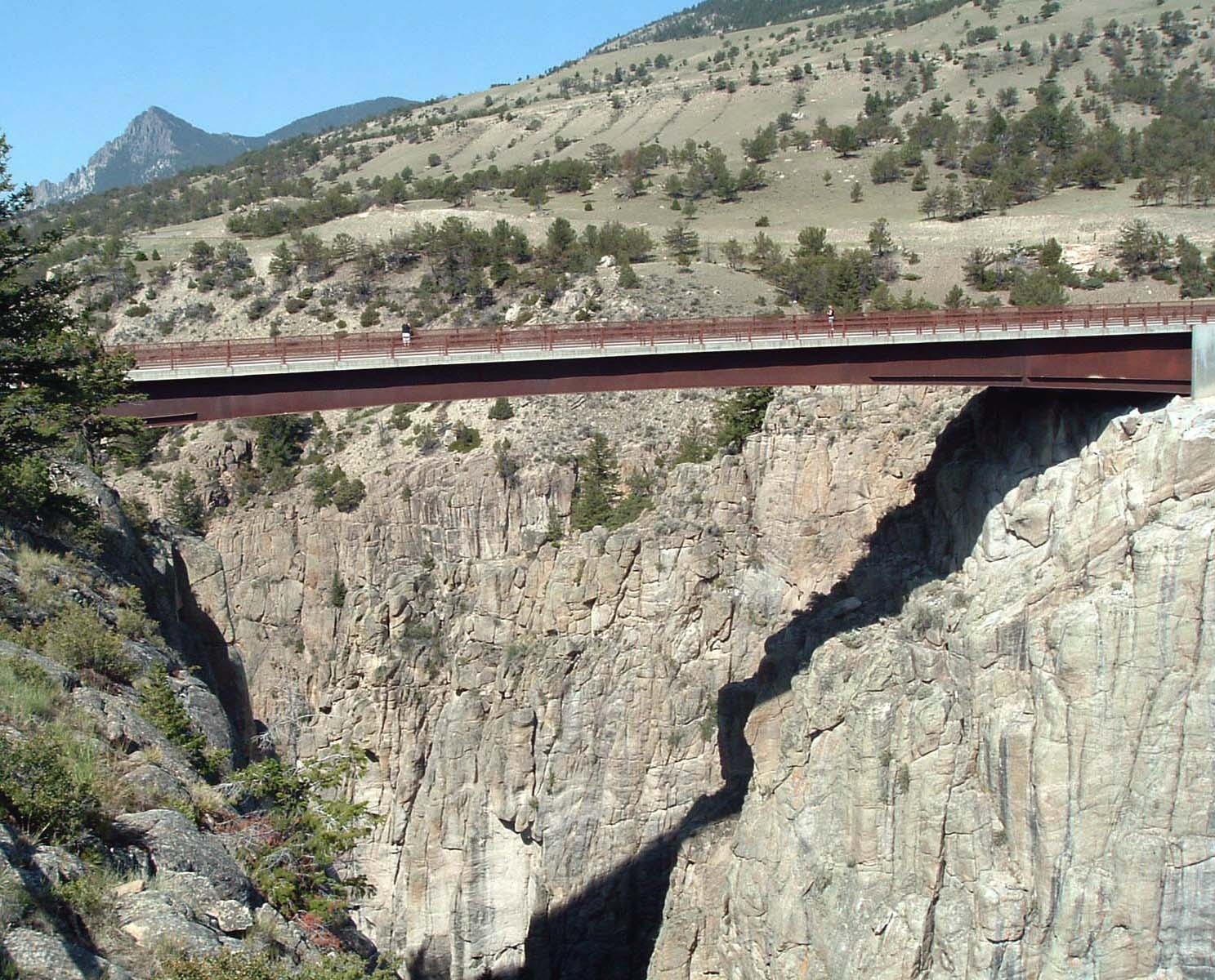
Sunlight Bridge today spans a canyon that the Nez Perce crossed on horseback.

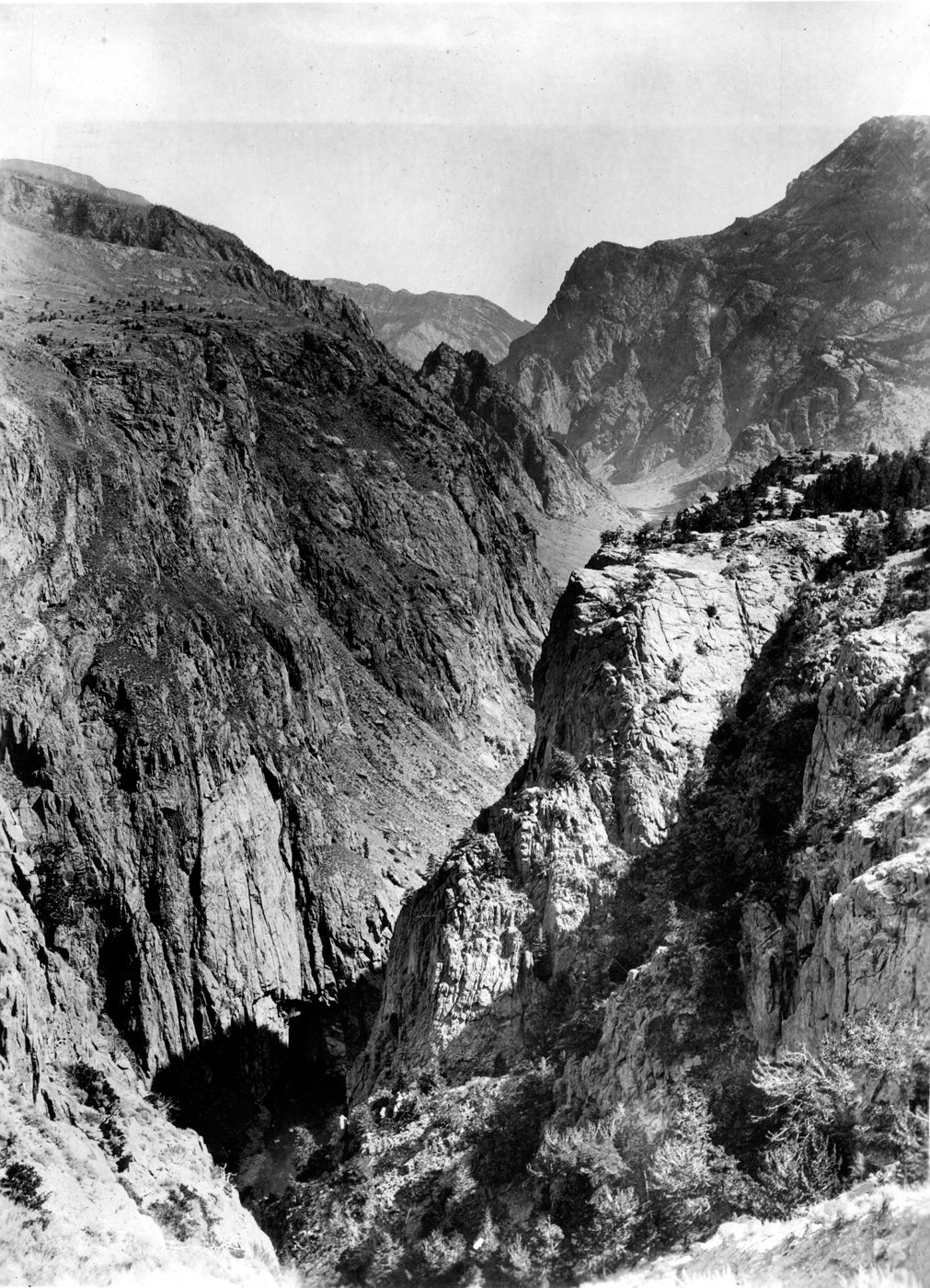
Clarks Fork Canyon. The Nez Perce descended into the Canyon via a narrow defile in the rock walls.

The Nez Perce entered Yellowstone National Park on August 23, 1877, near the Madison river. On September 6, 1877, they left the northeast corner of the park via Crandall Creek 44°49′03″N 109°47′13″W en route to the Clark's Fork of the Yellowstone. Once inside the park, the Nez Perce knew of three routes by which they could escape, northwest via the Yellowstone River, northeast via Clark's Fork of the Yellowstone or east via the Shoshone River. The Nez Perce, suspecting the Army would be waiting for them at all the usual exits, selected an unknown and most difficult route over the Absaroka Range reaching an elevation of nearly 10,000 feet (3,000 m). Fisher, following them, said it was "the roughest country I ever undertook to pass through. About every foot of it was obstructed with dead and fallen timber and huge blocks of grammar." After Fisher and his group of Bannocks had a skirmish with the rear guard of the Nez Perce, he broke off the chase and turned back to find General Howard and his soldiers. Once the main body of Nez Perce left the Yellowstone river, they moved up Pelican Creek onto the Mirror Plateau. It was there that James Irwin escaped. James Shively escaped a few days later. They continued east crossing the Lamar River and ascending one of the major creeks—Calfee, Miller or Cache. They reached the divide on the evening of September 5, 1877. On the morning of September 6, they continued northeast down Crandall Creek and into the canyon of the Clark's Fork of the Yellowstone. Although his forces had never been very far from the Nez Perce, Howard never engaged the Indians while in the park and chose an easier route to the Clark's Fork.

== The trap ==
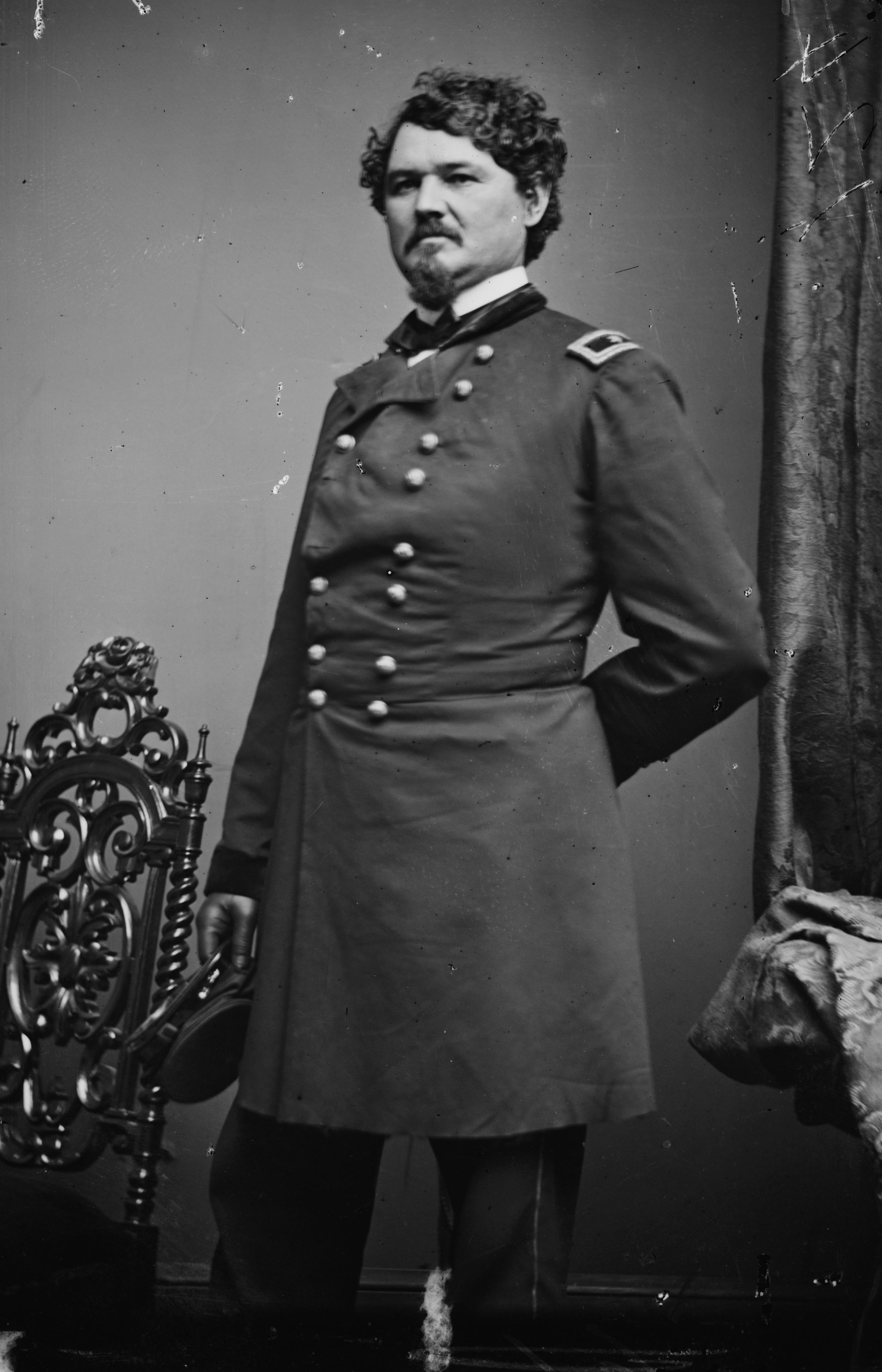
Col. Samuel D. Sturgis. His son had been killed in the Battle of the Little Bighorn. He was out-foxed by the Nez Perce when they emerged from the mountains of Yellowstone Park onto the Great Plains.

Howard and his soldiers crossed Yellowstone by a more northerly and easier route and reached the Northeast corner of the Park on Clark's Fork on September 7. From Fisher's scouting, the Army was now aware that the Nez Perce would emerge from the mountains near the Clark's Fork or the Shoshone Rivers. Howard continued on down the Clark's Fork River hoping to trap the Nez Perce between his force and that of Sturgis waiting below.

To prevent any news of their location getting to the army during their difficult passage down from the summit of the Absarokas to the Plains the Nez Perce hunted down and killed White prospectors and hunters in the area. Ten men were known to have been killed by the Indians and additional bodies were discovered over the next several months.

As other army troops ordered to guard the Yellowstone exits were not yet in place, Sturgis set up his base on the Plains from where he had an expansive view and could move quickly toward either Clark's Fork or to the Shoshone River. He seems to have discounted the Clark's Fork exit, "finding that no trail could possibly lead through it." The lower several miles of Clark's Fork passed through a narrow canyon with vertical walls 800 feet high. On September 8, when the Nez Perce reached a point six miles from Sturgis's force on top of a ridge near what is now called Dead Indian Pass, their advance scouts observed the soldiers far below. If the Indians took the open and easy route to reach the Plains, their 2,000 horses and 700 people would be easily visible. Instead they attempted a difficult maneuver to mislead the soldiers. They took a route going south toward the Shoshone River, and then, invisible to army scouts, milled their horses in a big circle to conceal their trail and sell the army on the idea that they were heading south. They then sneaked back north, concealed by heavy timber, and traversed Dead Indian Gulch down to the Clark's Fork River. Dead Indian Gulch was a narrow, steep-sided slit in the rock, dropping almost vertically for 1,000 feet and barely wide enough for two horses to go side-by-side. "In a cleanly executed maneuver," said a military historian, "the Nez Perce had countered an extremely serious threat and won a brilliant, though temporary respite."

Sturgis took the bait and led his soldiers away from the Clark's Fork and headed south to the Shoshone. The Nez Perce passed out onto the plains unopposed. Sturgis quickly realized his error and turned around. He met up with Howard on September 11 who had descended the Clark's Fork following the Nez Perce's route, but the two military forces were now two days and 50 miles behind the Nez Perce.

== Aftermath ==
Howard ordered Sturgis to take up pursuit of the Nez Perce whose trail led north into Montana. He would catch up with them on September 13 at the indecisive Battle of Canyon Creek.45°43′14″N 108°35′34″W Colonel Miles would later take Chief Joseph's surrender in the Bear Paw Mountains just miles from the Canada–US border on October 5, 1877.

George Cowan and Albert Oldham completely recovered from their injuries in Radersburg. Cowan would spend a lot of time in the park in later years telling visitors about his encounter with the Nez Perce. Wiekert and McCartney eventually recovered the bodies of Kenck and Dietrich and both are buried in Helena, Montana.

In 1902, Major Hiram M. Chittenden, U.S. Army Corps of Engineers, Yellowstone's chief road builder embarked on a campaign to mark all the historic spots in the park from the 1877 Nez Perce war. By 1904, with the help of participants George and Emma Cowan and others, signs marked the locations of all the key encounters during the Nez Perce flight through the park. By the 1930s, the signs were all gone. The only memorial today is "The Chief Joseph Story" roadside marker where Nez Perce Creek crosses the Grand Loop Road.

A portion of the route of the Nez Perce is followed today by Wyoming Highway 296 which is named the Chief Joseph Scenic Byway. Sunlight Creek Bridge, Dead Indian Hill and Dead Indian Campground are along the approximate route of the Nez Perce before they feinted a movement to the south to confuse the soldiers on the plain below.

=== Park features named from the event ===
- Nez Perce Creek (the East fork of the Firehole river in 1877). Also known as Hayden's fork (1871), east fork of the Madison River (pre-1871) Officially designated Nez Perce Creek in 1885 during the Arnold Hague Geological Surveys of the park.
- Nez Perce Ford is the location of Chief Joseph's crossing of the Yellowstone River on August 25, 1877. First named by superintendent Philetus Norris in 1880, the ford has also been known as Chief Joseph's Crossing and Buffalo Ford (1946).
- Joseph Peak el. 10,420 feet (3,180 m)44°57′31″N 110°53′05″W in the Gallatin Range southwest of Electric Peak. Named by members of the Arnold Hague survey in 1885 to honor Chief Joseph's flight through the park.
- Cowan Creek44°35′42″N 110°41′40″W, a tributary of Nez Perce Creek about 6 miles (9.7 km) west of the Lower Geyser Basin on the Mary Mountain trail. It was named in honor of George F. Cowan who was wounded by Nez Perce near the mouth of the creek. Chief Park Naturalist, David Condon officially named the creek in 1956. It was formerly known as both Yellowstone Creek and Willow Creek.

== See also ==
- Nez Perce National Historic Trail, https://www.fs.usda.gov/npnht/, accessed 31 Jan 2012
- Online copy of Nez Perce Joseph : an account of his ancestors, his lands, his confederates, his enemies, his murders, his war, his pursuit and capture (1881)
- Northern Cheyenne Exodus
