= Sepulcher Mountain =

Mountain in Wyoming, United States

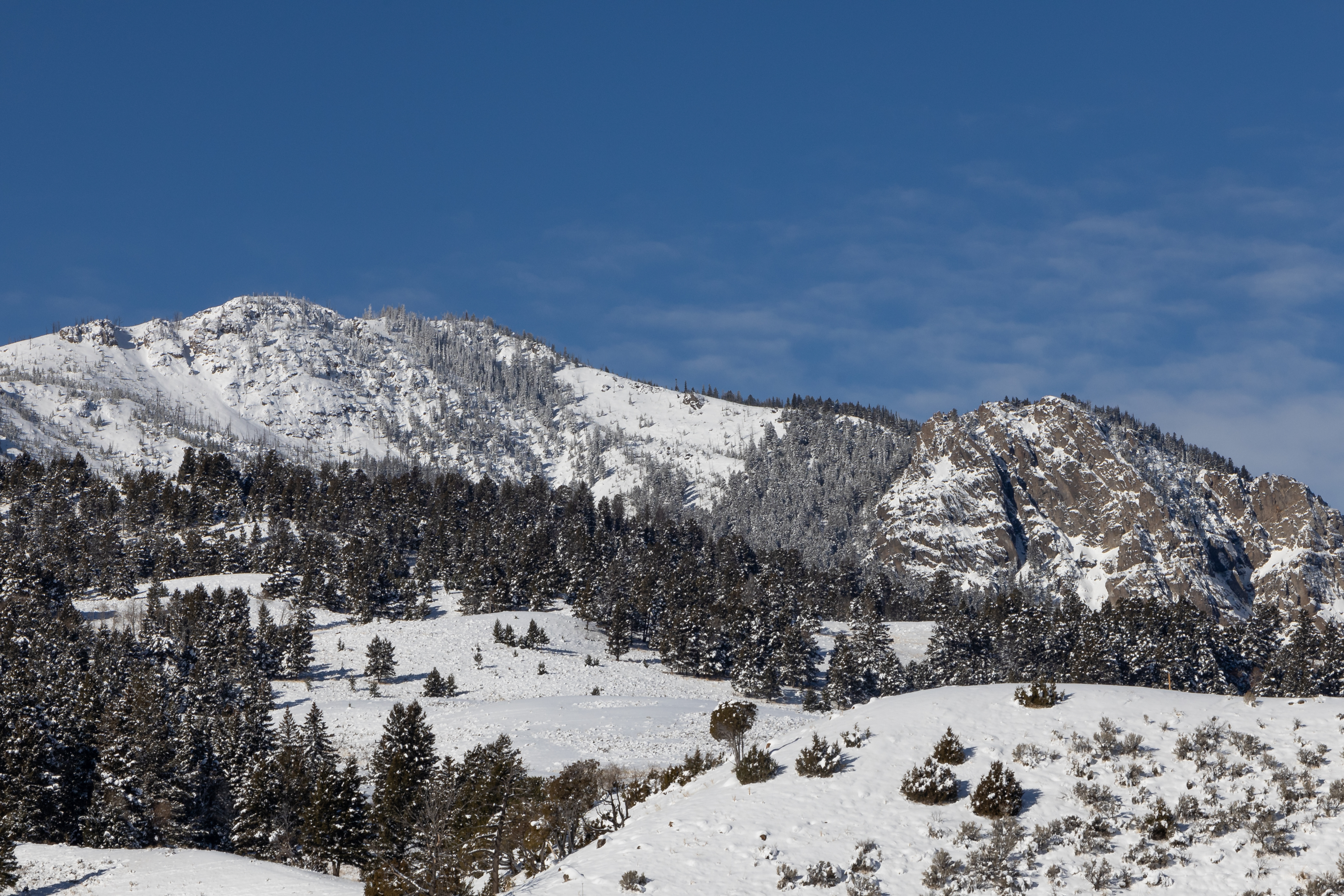
- Sepulcher Mountain, 2009

Highest point
- Elevation: 9,642 ft (2,939 m)
- Coordinates: 44°59′25″N 110°46′01″W

Geography
- Location within Wyoming
- Location: Northeast Mammoth Hot Springs, Yellowstone National Park, Park County, Wyoming, U.S.
- Parent range: Gallatin Range
- Topo map: Quadrant Mountain

Sepulcher Mountain, elevation 9,642 feet (2,939 m), is a moderate mountain peak in northwest Yellowstone National Park halfway between the summit of Electric Peak and Mammoth Hot Springs. The peak was named Sepulcher by U.S. Army Captain John W. Barlow in 1871 because of its resemblance to a crypt when viewed from Gardiner, Montana.

The summit of Sepulcher Mountain can be reached by a 7.2-mile (11.6 km) trail from the mouth of Clematis Creek at Mammoth Hot Springs.

== Gallery ==
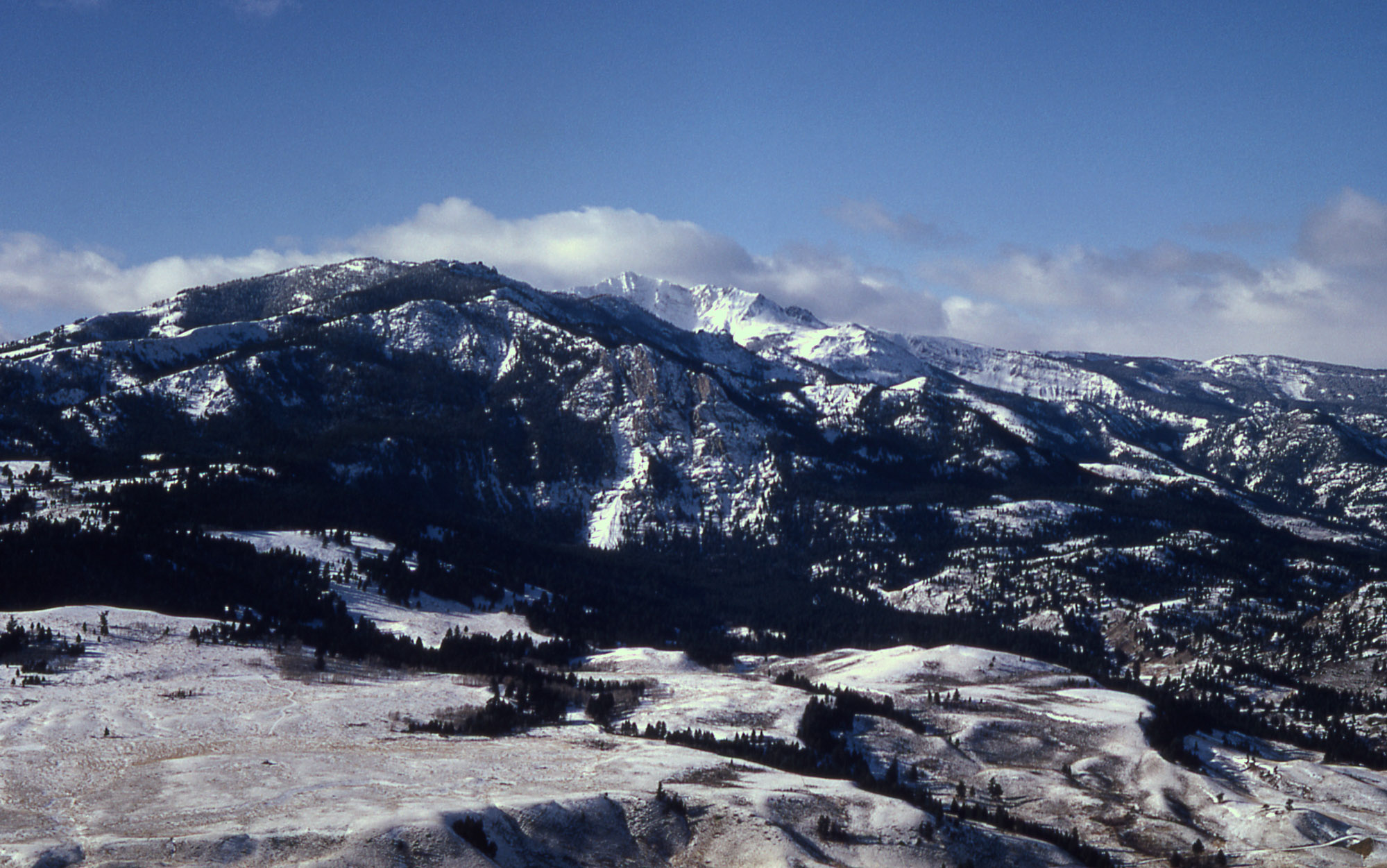
Sepulcher with Electric Peak behind, 1966

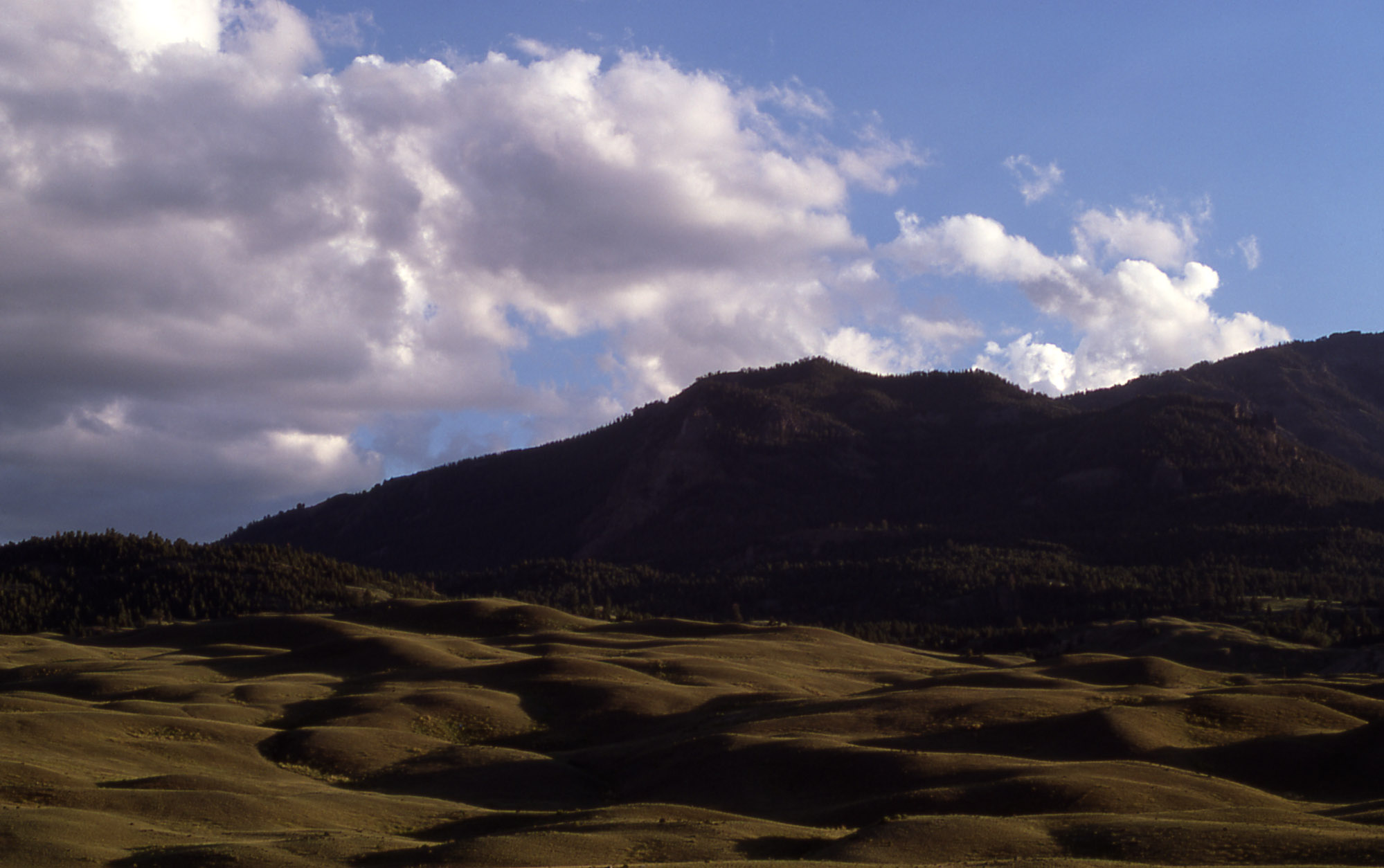
Sepulcher Mountain, NW, 1977

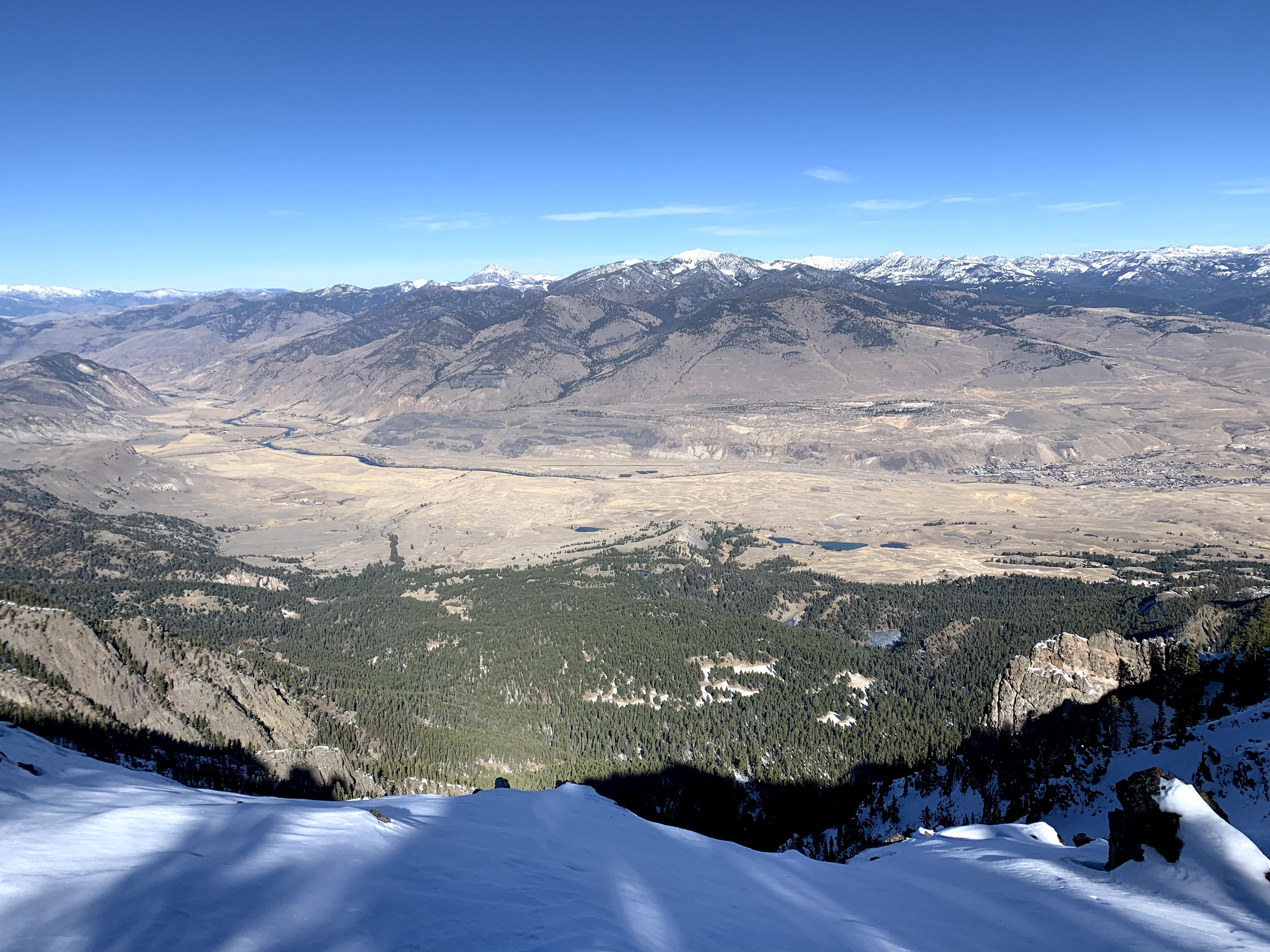
View of Gardiner, Montana from close to the summit

== See also ==
- Mountains and mountain ranges of Yellowstone National Park
