= Gardner River =

River in the United States of America

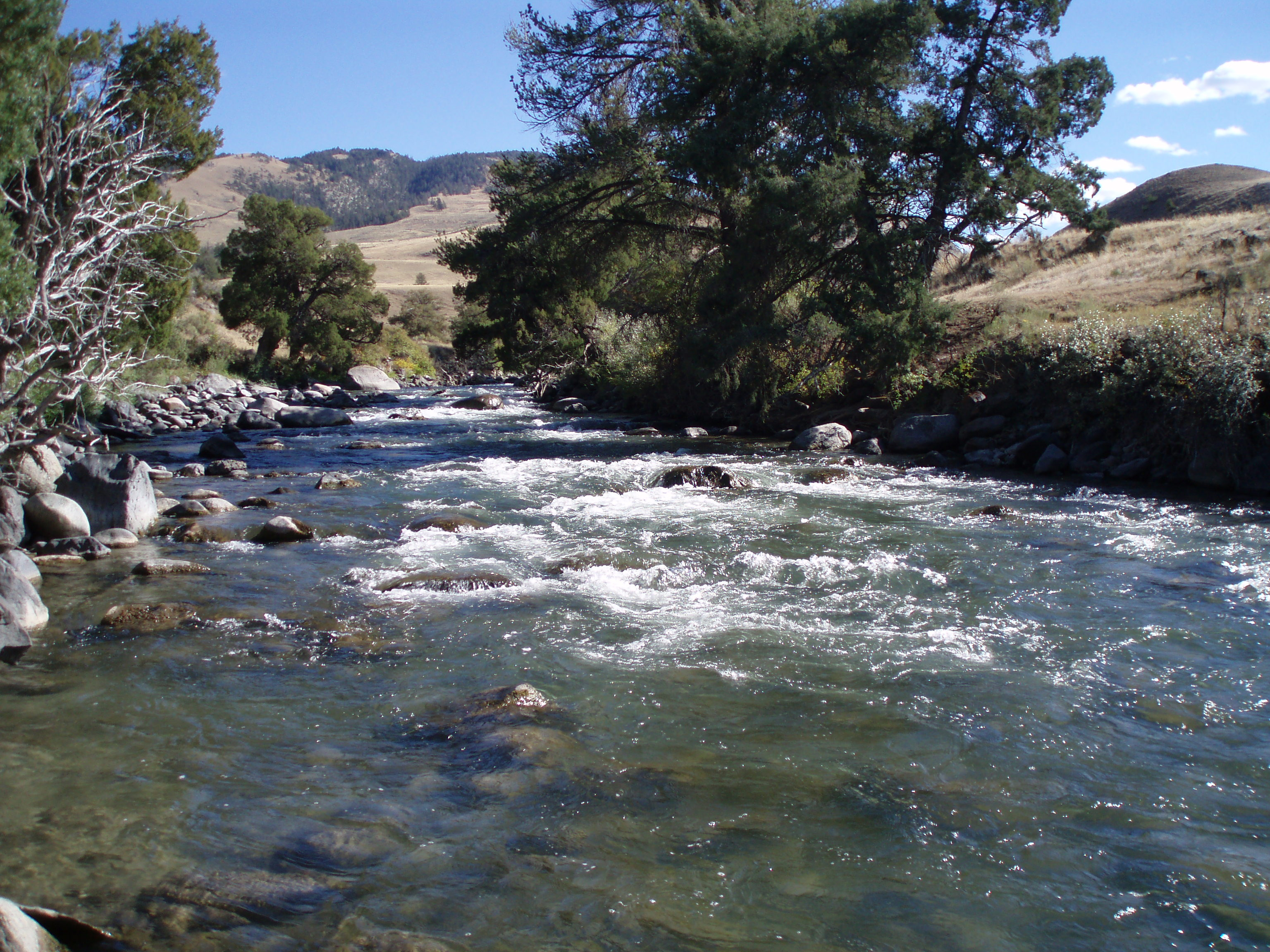
- Gardner River near its confluence with the Yellowstone River

- Location of the mouth within Montana Gardner River (the United States)

Location
- Country: United States
- States: Wyoming, Montana

Physical characteristics
- Source
  - location: Joseph Peak, Yellowstone National Park, Wyoming
  - coordinates: 44°57′15″N 110°52′03″W
- Mouth: Yellowstone River
  - location: Gardiner, Montana
  - coordinates: 45°01′47″N 110°42′01″W
- Length: 25 mi (40 km)
- Basin size: 202 sq mi (520 km^{2})
- Discharge
  - location: near Mammoth
  - average: 213 cu ft/s (6.0 m^{3}/s)

Basin features
- Tributaries
  - left: Lava Creek, Obsidian Creek
  - right: Glen Creek, Indian Creek (Wyoming)

The Gardner River (also known as the Gardiner River) is a tributary of the Yellowstone River, approximately 25 miles (40 km) long, in northwestern Wyoming and south central Montana in the United States. The entire river is located within Yellowstone National Park. It rises on the slope of Joseph Peak, Gallatin Range in the northwestern part of the park, and winds southeast through Gardner's Hole, a broad subalpine basin which is a popular trout fishing location. The Gardner falls within the Native Trout Conservation Area and anglers are allowed to take an unlimited number of brown and rainbow trout. Mountain whitefish and Yellowstone cutthroat trout must be released. Angling on the Gardner is governed by Yellowstone National Park fishing regulations. After merging with Panther Creek, Indian Creek and Obsidian Creek, it then turns north and flows through a steep canyon where it cuts through a basaltic flow from approximately 500,000 years ago known as Sheepeater Cliffs. Below Sheepeater, Glen Creek out of Golden Gate Canyon and Lava Creek out of Lava Creek Canyon join the Gardner near Mammoth Hot Springs. The river crosses the 45th parallel in Gardner Canyon and is also home to a popular hot spring known as The Boiling River. The river continues north through Gardner Canyon and empties into the Yellowstone near Gardiner, Montana.

== History ==
The river and the town of Gardiner were named for Johnson Gardner who was a free trapper in the early 19th century. In the 1830s, he worked northwestern Yellowstone and sold his furs to the American Fur Company. On September 13, 1869, the Cook–Folsom–Peterson Expedition entered the park region and crossed the river at its mouth on their way up the Yellowstone. On August 26, 1870, the Washburn-Langford-Doane Expedition entered what was to become the northern boundary of Yellowstone National Park at Gardiner and camped near the confluence before they crossed the river and proceeded south up the Yellowstone river. Both these expeditions did not explore the Gardner and thus did not encounter the geothermal features of Mammoth Hot Springs. The 1871 Geological Survey of the park region by F. V. Hayden did explore the Gardner and describe Mammoth Hot Springs, but the Mammoth area itself was named by an illegal concessionaire, Harry R. Hohr, who tried to claim land in early 1871 in the newly explored park region.

The lower few miles of the river is paralleled by the North Entrance Road Historic District.

The river was affected by the 2022 Montana floods.

Images of the Gardner River
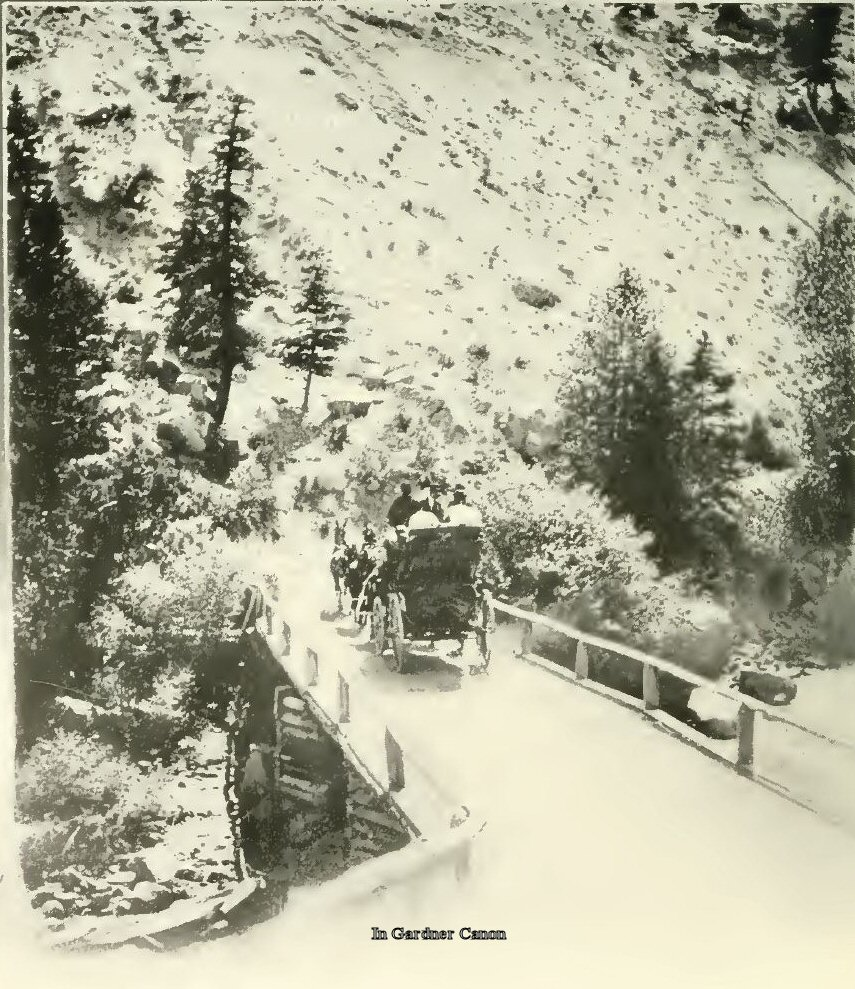
Gardner River Crossing, 1901

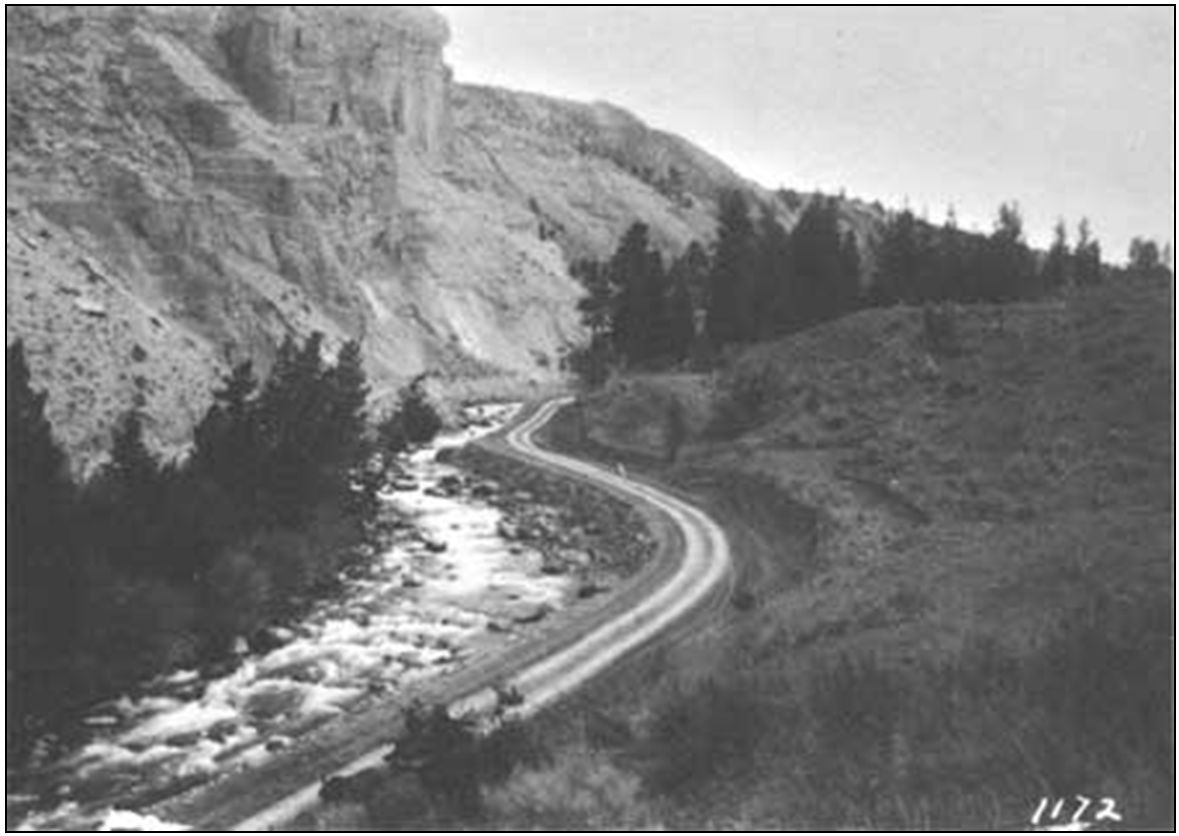
Lower Gardner River road, 1912

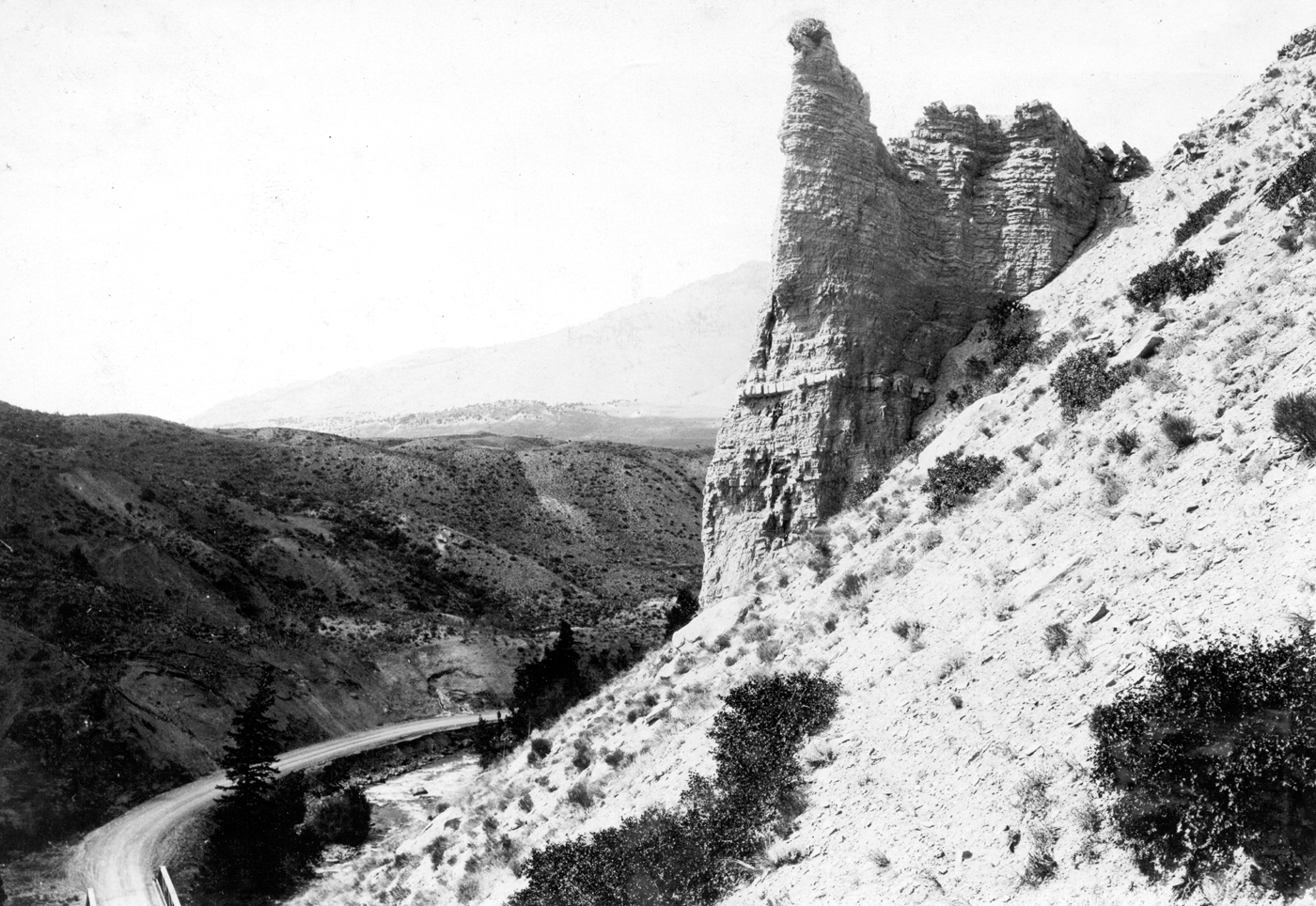
Eagle Nest Rock, an Osprey nesting site in Gardner River Canyon, 1921

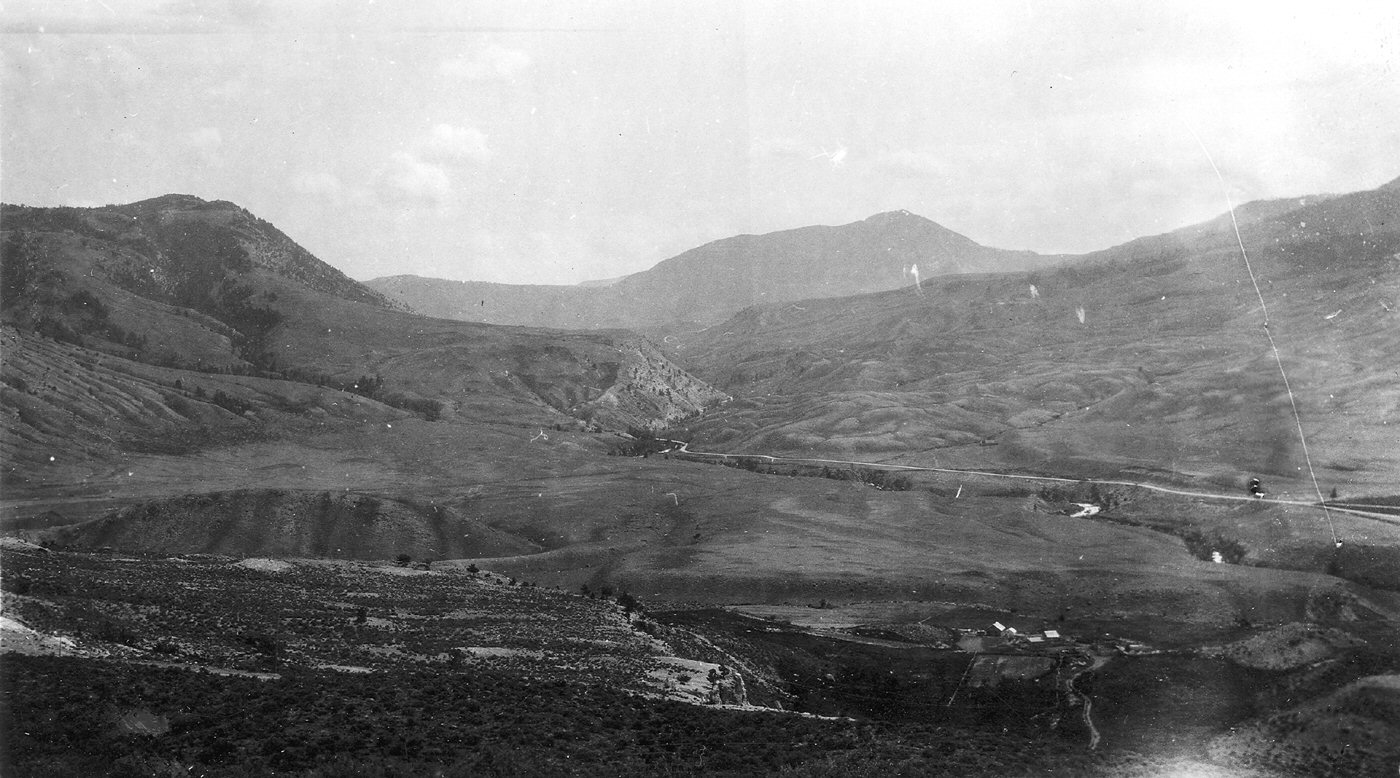
Lower Gardner River, 1923

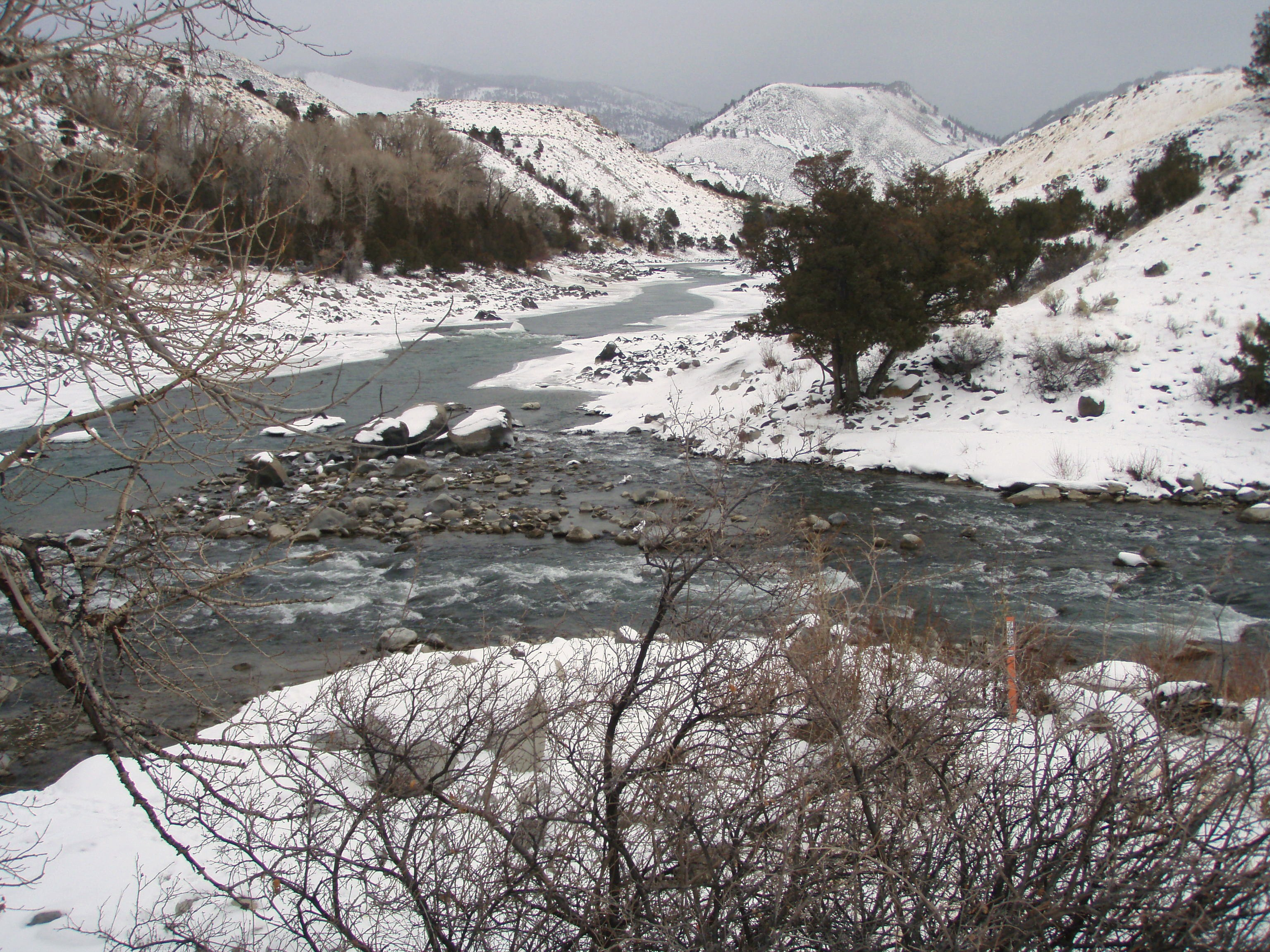
Confluence of Yellowstone and Gardner rivers

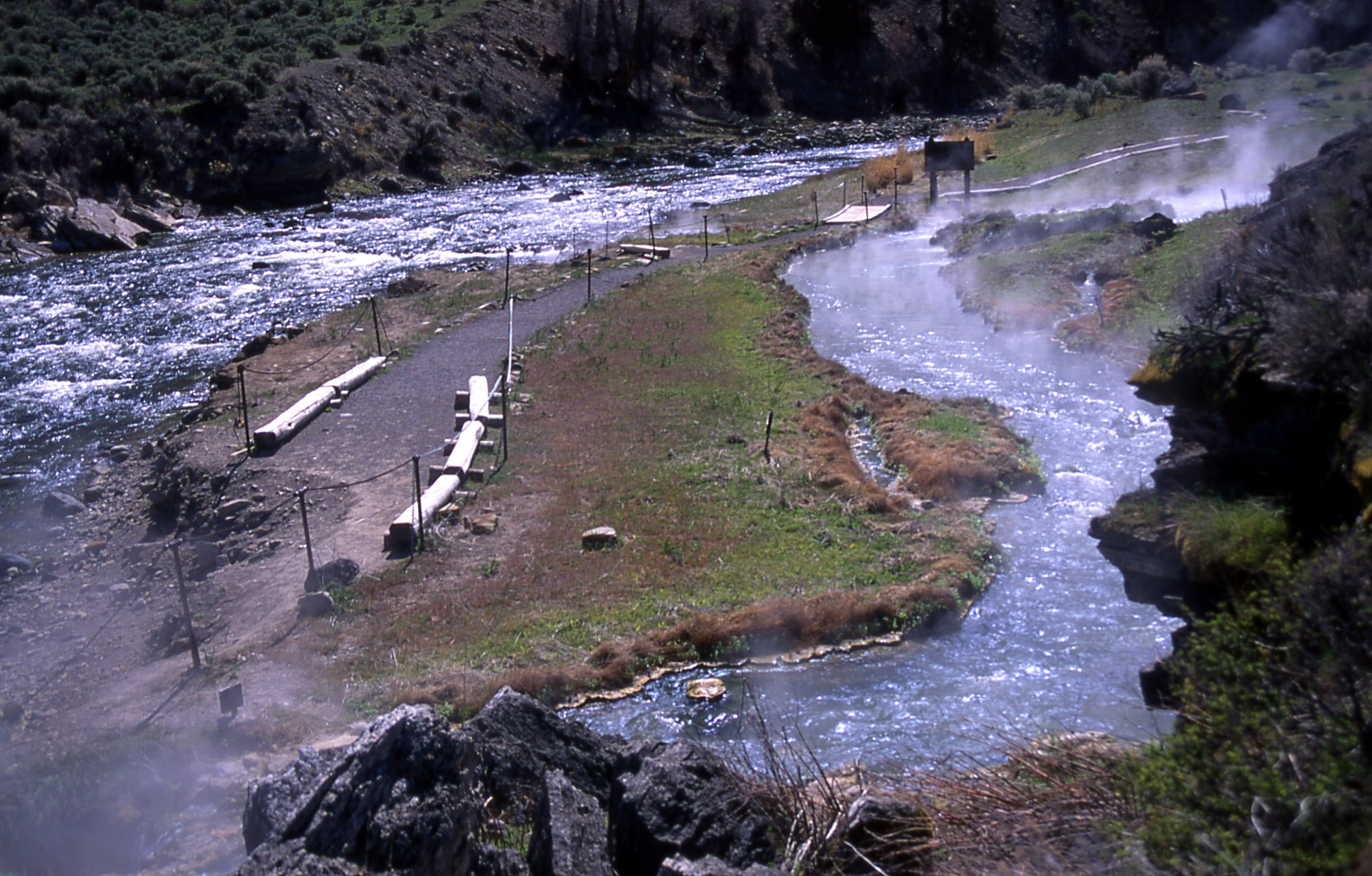
Boiling River section of the Gardner

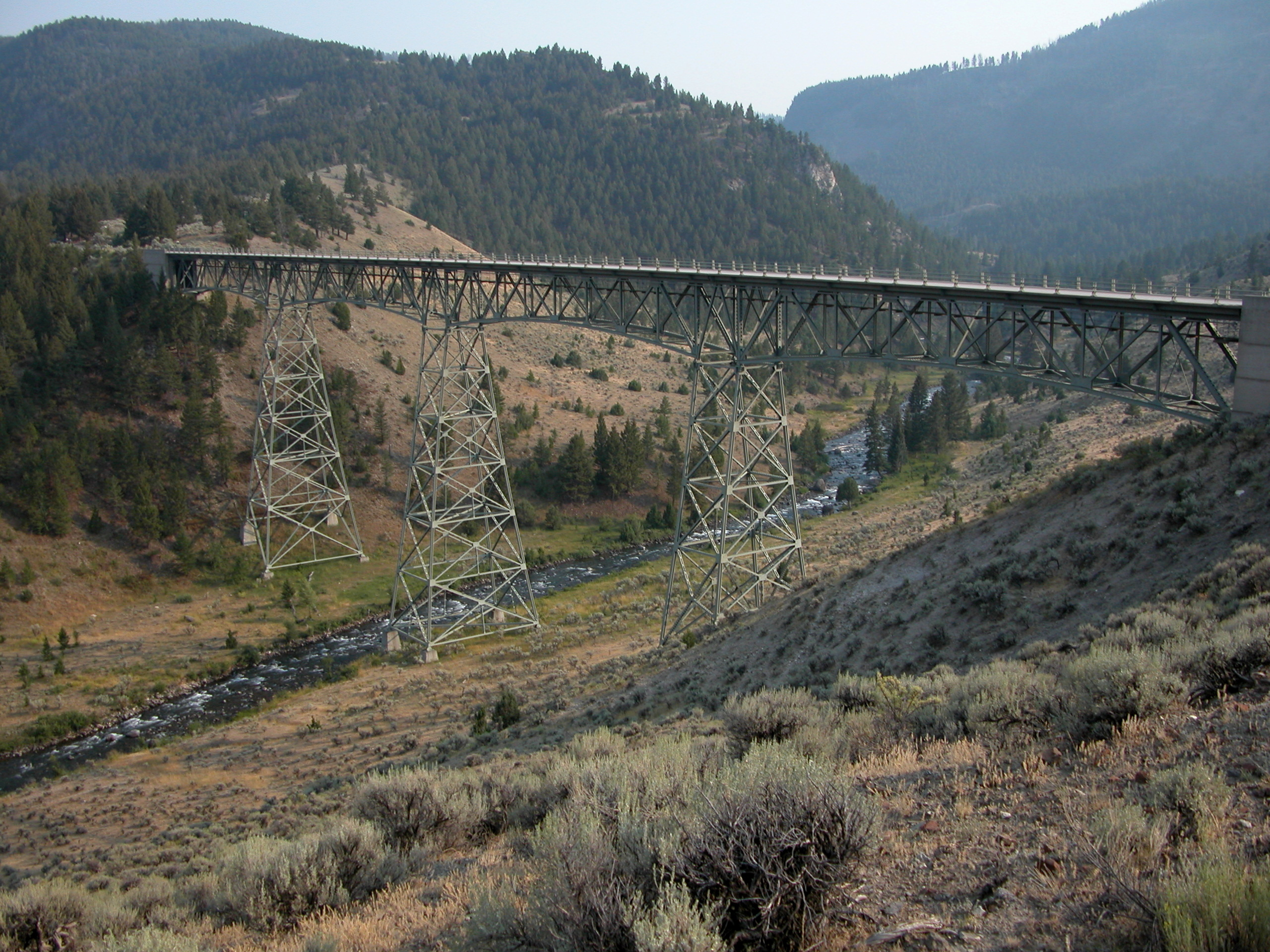
Grand Loop bridge over Gardner River

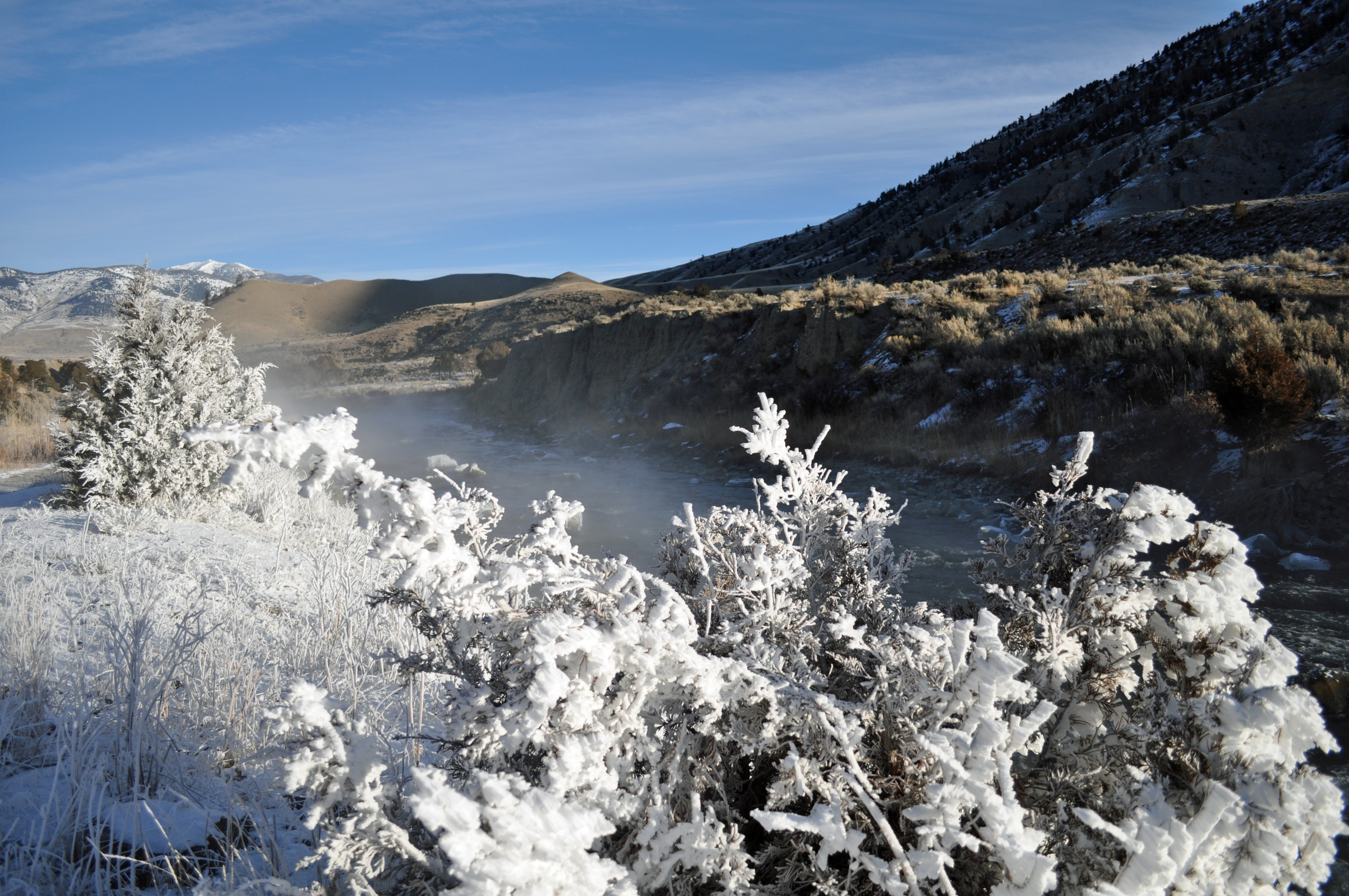
Winter 2009

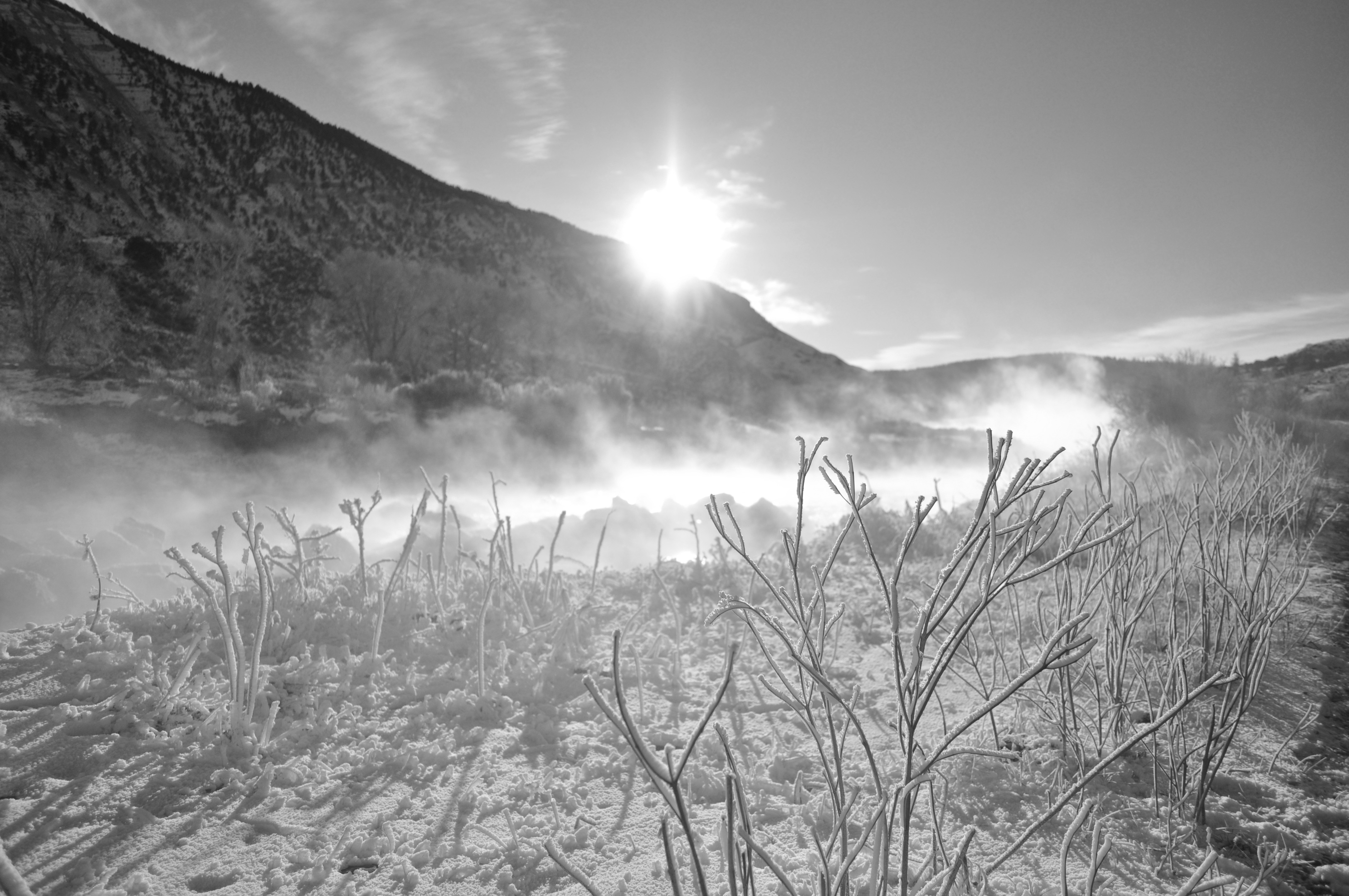
Winter 2009 near Boiling River

== See also ==
- Angling in Yellowstone National Park
- Fishes of Yellowstone National Park
- North Entrance Road Historic District
- List of Montana rivers
- List of Wyoming rivers
