= Steamboat Mountain (Gallatin County, Montana) =

Mountain in Montana, United States

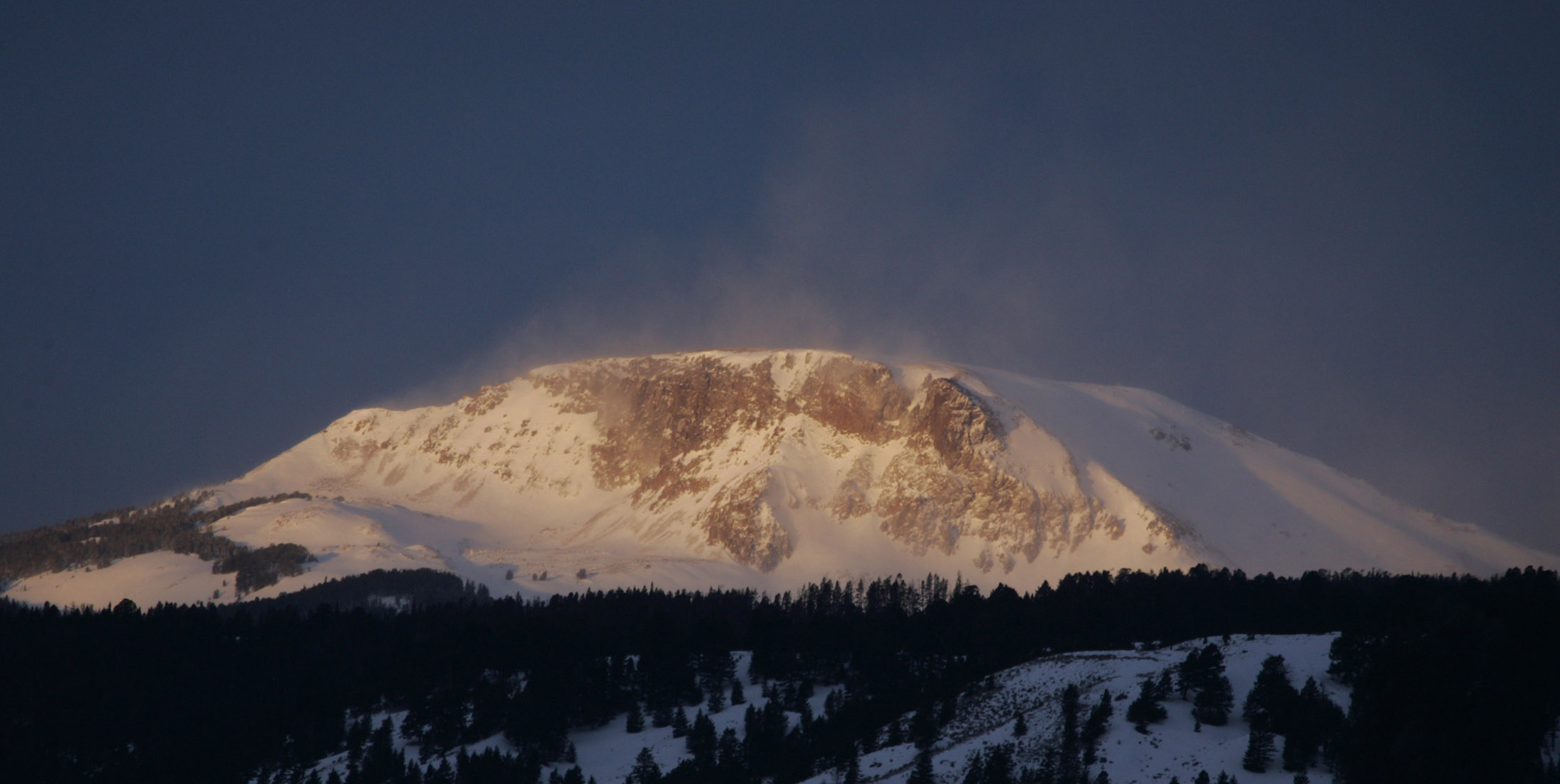
- East aspect

Highest point
- Elevation: 10,030 ft (3,057 m)
- Prominence: 666 ft (203 m)
- Parent peak: Twin Peaks
- Isolation: 1.55 mi (2.49 km)
- Coordinates: 45°10′49″N 111°03′33″W

Geography
- Location within Montana Location within the United States
- Country: United States
- State: Montana
- County: Gallatin
- Protected area: Gallatin National Forest
- Parent range: Gallatin Range; Rocky Mountains
- Topo map: USGS Ramshorn Peak

Steamboat Mountain is a 10,030-foot (3,057-metre) mountain summit in Gallatin County, Montana, United States.

== Description ==
Steamboat Mountain is located 33 miles (53 km) south of Bozeman in the Gallatin National Forest and the Hyalite Porcupine Buffalo Horn Wilderness Study Area. The peak is part of the Gallatin Range which is a subrange of the Rocky Mountains. Precipitation runoff from the mountain's slopes drains west to Rock Creek and east to Tom Miner Creek which are both tributaries of the Yellowstone River. Topographic relief is significant as the summit rises over 1,900 feet (579 meters) above Rock Creek in one mile (1.6 km). The mountain's toponym was officially adopted in 1918 by the United States Board on Geographic Names.

== Climate ==
Based on the Köppen climate classification, Steamboat Mountain is located in a subarctic climate zone characterized by long, usually very cold winters, and mild summers. Winter temperatures can drop below 0 °F with wind chill factors below −10 °F.

== See also ==
- Geology of the Rocky Mountains
