= Electric Peak (Montana) =

Mountain in Montana, United States

- Aerial view of Electric Peak in autumn

Highest point
- Elevation: 10,969 ft (3,343 m)
- Prominence: 3,389 ft (1,033 m)
- Coordinates: 45°00′19″N 110°50′15″W

Geography
- Location within Montana
- Location: Yellowstone National Park, Park County, Montana, U.S.
- Parent range: Gallatin Range
- Topo map: USGS Electric Peak

Climbing
- First ascent: 1872 in Henry Gannett and party
- Easiest route: Hike

Electric Peak is the tallest mountain in the Gallatin Range of southern Montana, close to the Wyoming border and rising to an altitude of 10,969 feet (3,343 m). The peak has some of the greatest physical relief in Yellowstone National Park, rising 3,389 ft (1,033 m) above its base.

Electric Peak was named during the first ascent in 1872 by the United States Geological Survey. Members of the Hayden Survey led by Henry Gannett experienced electrical discharges from their hands and hair after a lightning event on the summit.

== Climate ==
Climate data for Electric Peak 45.0101 N, 110.8423 W, Elevation: 10,325 ft (3,147 m) (1991–2020 normals)
| Month | Jan | Feb | Mar | Apr | May | Jun | Jul | Aug | Sep | Oct | Nov | Dec | Year |
|---|---|---|---|---|---|---|---|---|---|---|---|---|---|
| Mean daily maximum °F (°C) | 22.5 (−5.3) | 21.9 (−5.6) | 26.7 (−2.9) | 32.2 (0.1) | 41.6 (5.3) | 51.6 (10.9) | 63.0 (17.2) | 62.7 (17.1) | 52.9 (11.6) | 39.3 (4.1) | 27.5 (−2.5) | 21.5 (−5.8) | 38.6 (3.7) |
| Daily mean °F (°C) | 14.1 (−9.9) | 12.6 (−10.8) | 16.8 (−8.4) | 21.4 (−5.9) | 30.2 (−1.0) | 39.5 (4.2) | 49.3 (9.6) | 48.9 (9.4) | 40.2 (4.6) | 28.5 (−1.9) | 19.2 (−7.1) | 13.5 (−10.3) | 27.9 (−2.3) |
| Mean daily minimum °F (°C) | 5.8 (−14.6) | 3.4 (−15.9) | 6.8 (−14.0) | 10.7 (−11.8) | 18.9 (−7.3) | 27.3 (−2.6) | 35.6 (2.0) | 35.2 (1.8) | 27.4 (−2.6) | 17.7 (−7.9) | 10.8 (−11.8) | 5.4 (−14.8) | 17.1 (−8.3) |
| Average precipitation inches (mm) | 4.02 (102) | 3.74 (95) | 3.97 (101) | 4.78 (121) | 4.90 (124) | 4.63 (118) | 2.27 (58) | 2.27 (58) | 2.55 (65) | 3.64 (92) | 3.80 (97) | 4.20 (107) | 44.77 (1,138) |
Source: PRISM Climate Group

== Gallery ==
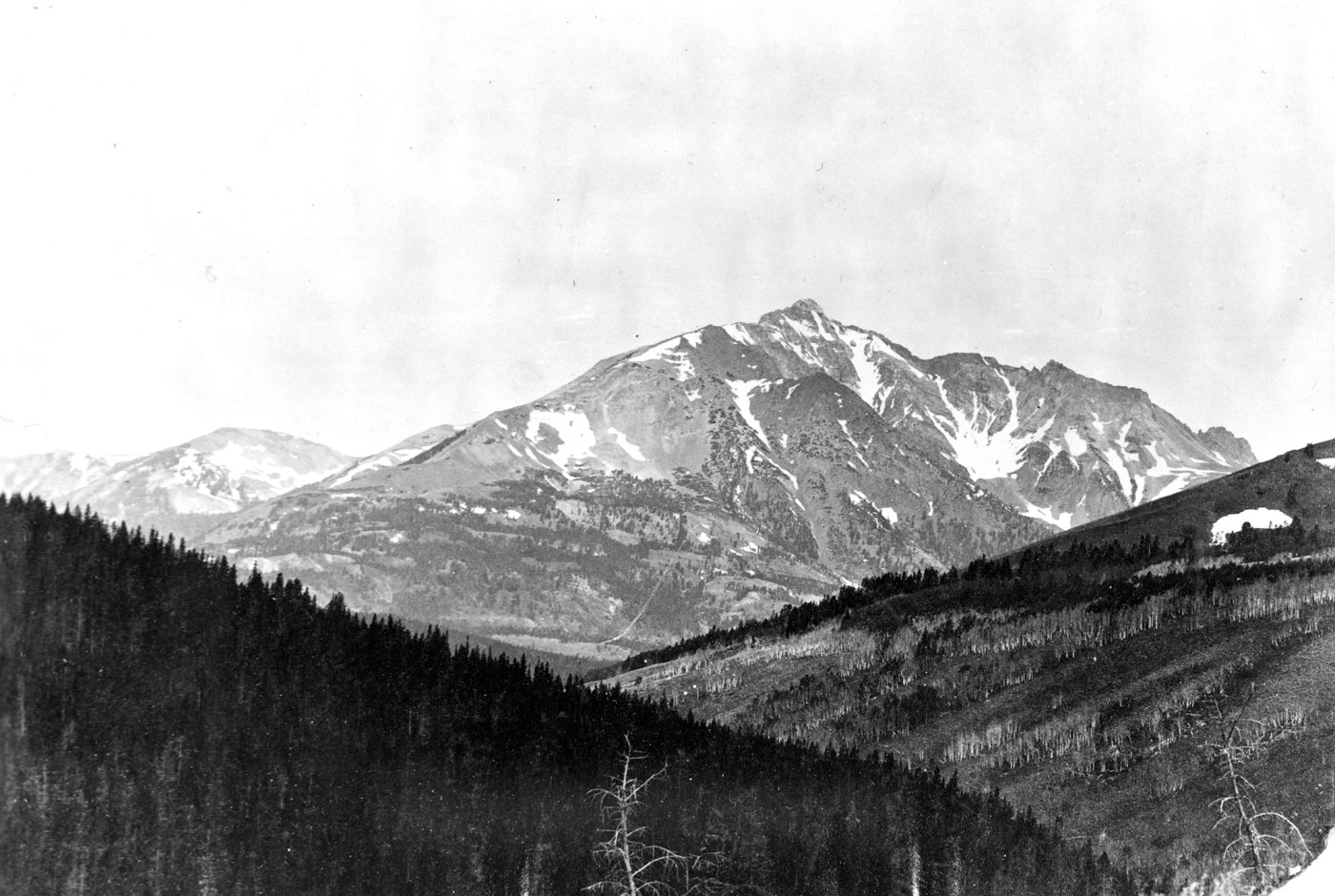
Film photograph by Joseph P. Iddings (1890)

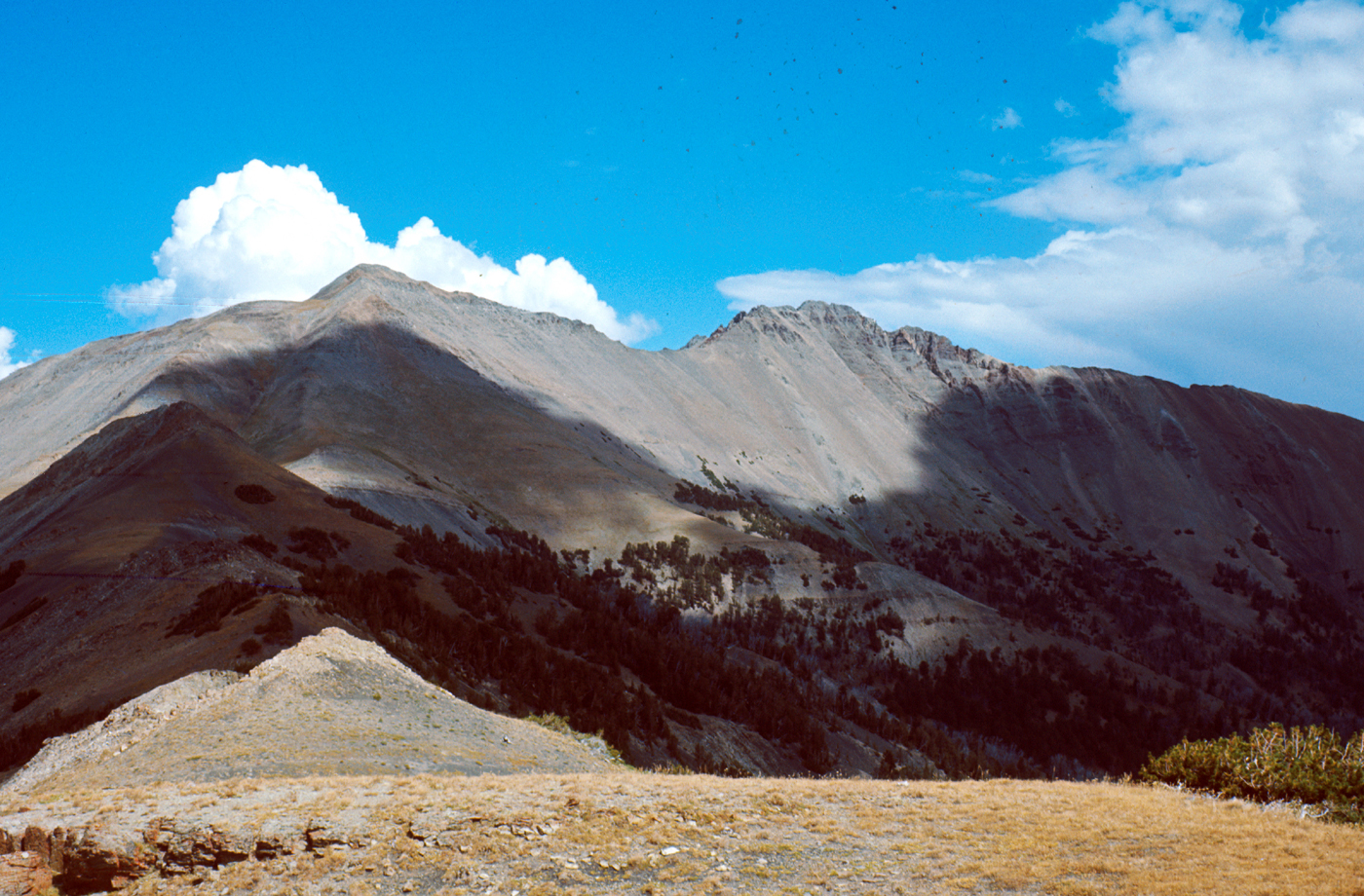
Western aspect (1967)

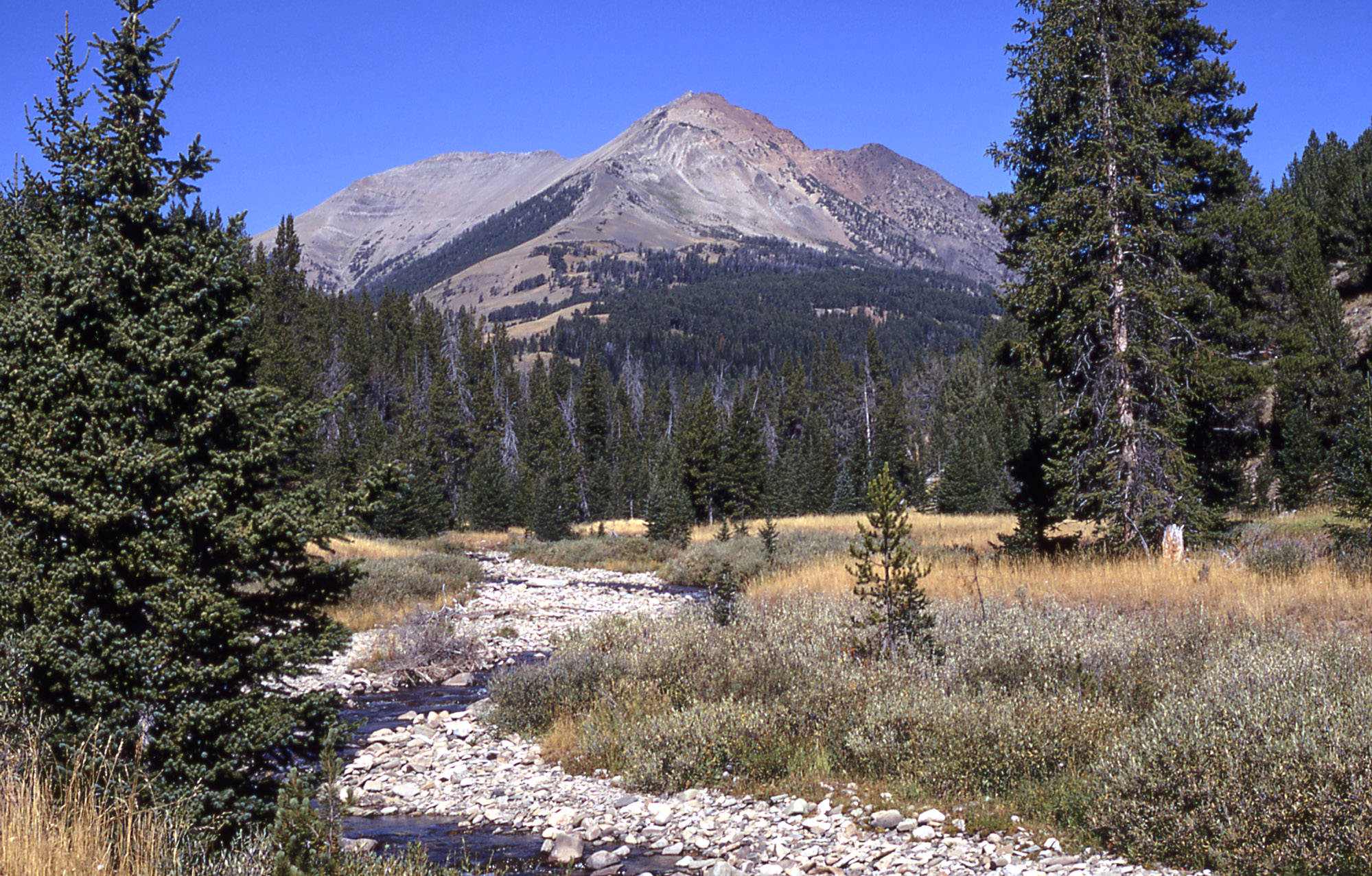
View from base (2006)

Electric Peak and Rescue Creek (2012)

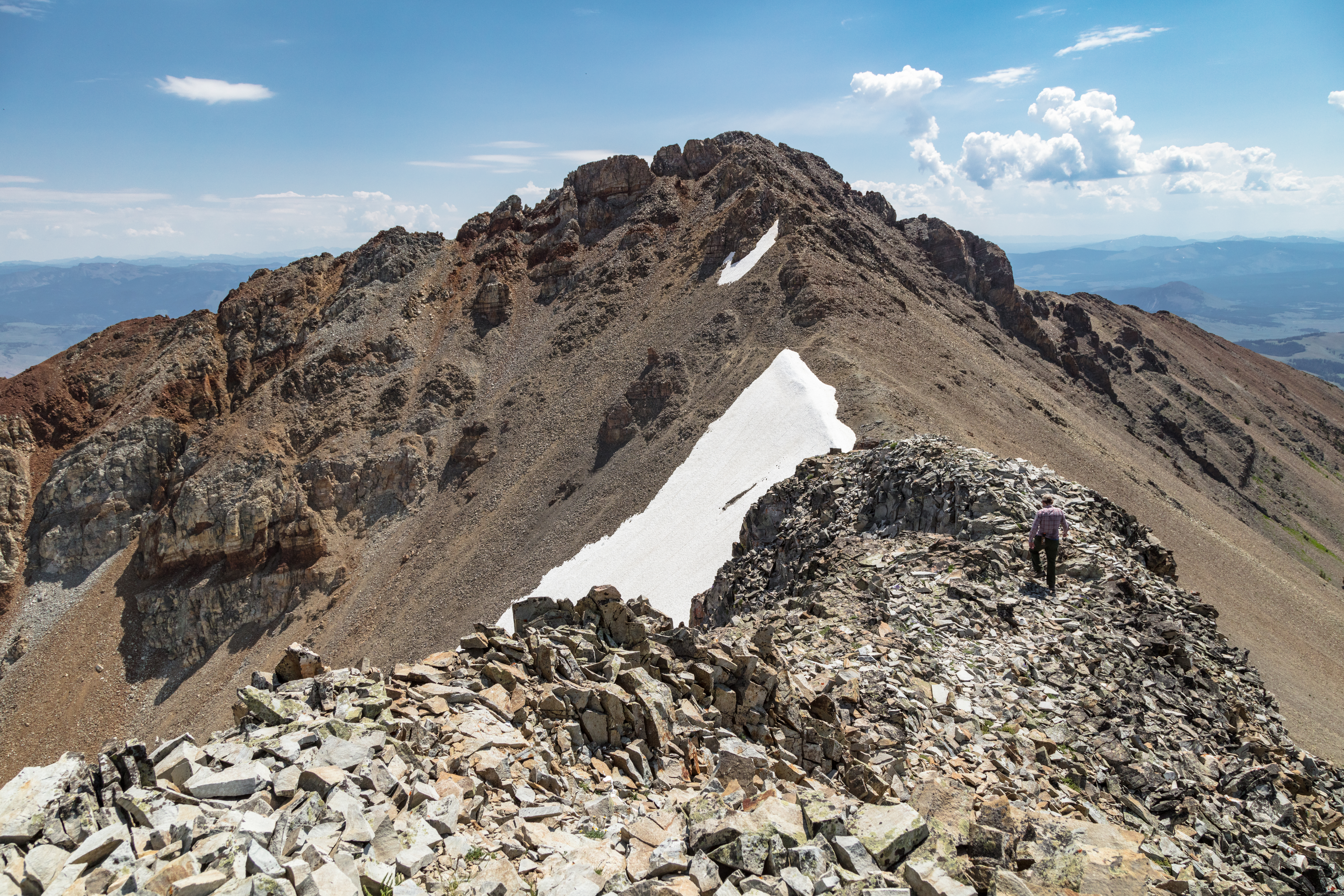
Summit ridge (2017)

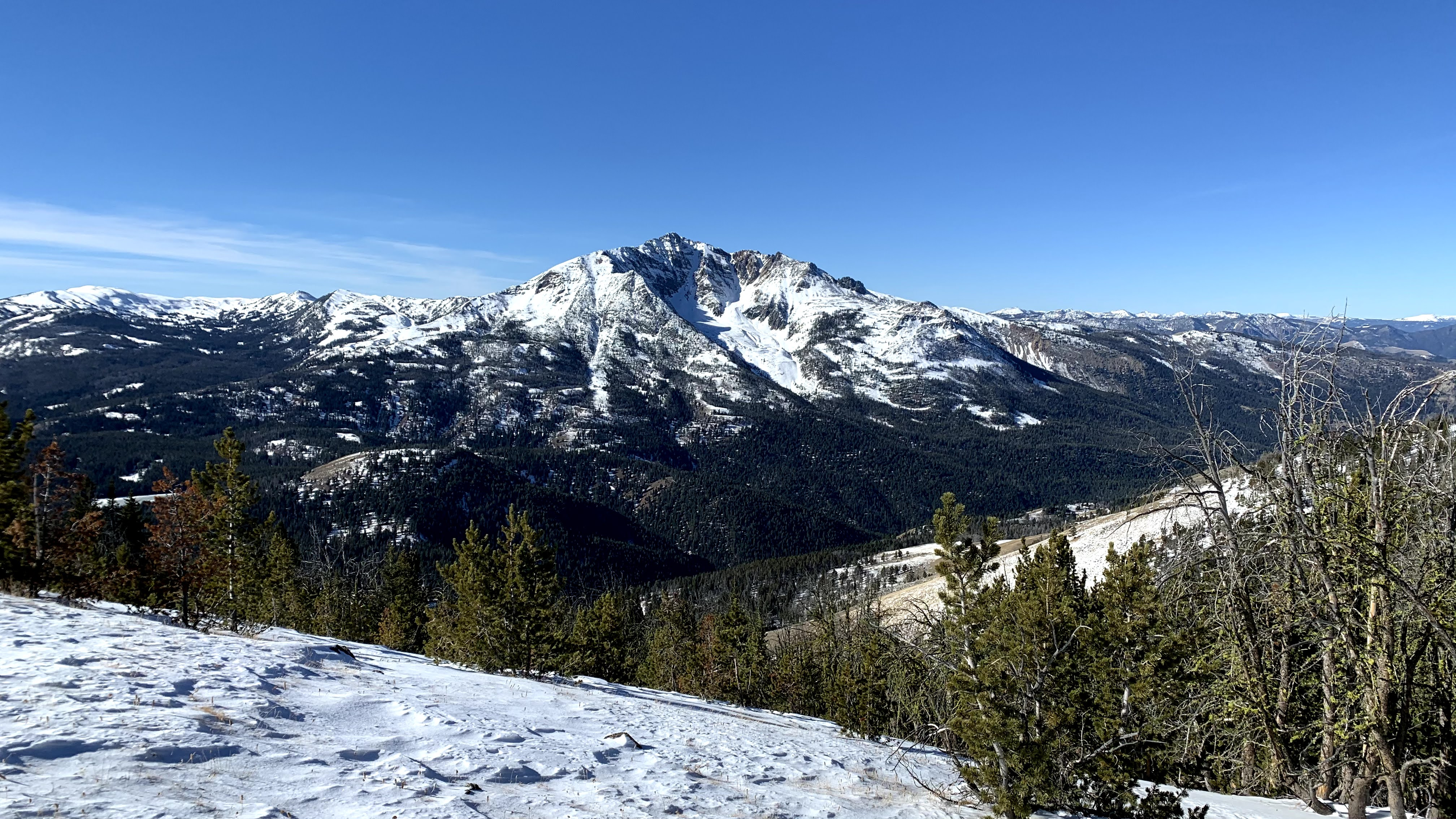
Electric Peak from Sepulcher Mountain (2020)

== See also ==
- Mountains and mountain ranges of Yellowstone National Park
- Gallatin National Forest
