= Joseph Peak =

Mountain in Montana, United States

- Location within Montana

Highest point
- Elevation: 10,420 ft (3,180 m)
- Coordinates: 44°57′31″N 110°53′05″W

Geography
- Location: Yellowstone National Park, Park County, Montana
- Parent range: Gallatin Range

Joseph Peak is a mountain peak in the southern section of the Gallatin Range in Yellowstone National Park, in the U.S. state of Montana. It was named for Chief Joseph. It has an elevation of 10,420 feet (3,180 m).

== See also ==
- Mountains and mountain ranges of Yellowstone National Park
