= Gallatin Range =

Mountain range in Montana and Wyoming, United States

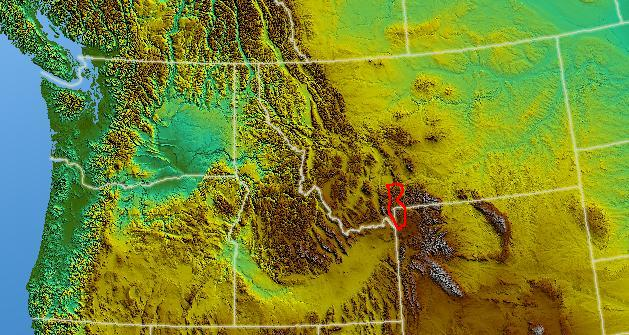

Highest point
- Peak: Electric Peak
- Elevation: 10,969 ft (3,343 m)
- Coordinates: 45°00′19″N 110°50′12″W

Geography
- Country: United States
- States: Montana and Wyoming
- Parent range: Rocky Mountains

The Gallatin Range is a mountain range of the Rocky Mountains, located in the U.S. states of Montana and Wyoming. It includes more than 10 mountains over 10,000 feet (3,000 m). The highest peak in the range is Electric Peak at 10,969 feet (3,343 m).

The Gallatin Range was named after Albert Gallatin, the longest-serving US Secretary of the Treasury. The range extends 75 miles (121 km) north to south and averages 20 miles (32 km) in width.

== Geography ==
Aerial view of the southern Gallatin Range in Wyoming

The southernmost peaks of the range are in the northwestern section of Yellowstone National Park. However, the majority of the range is in Gallatin National Forest. The Yellowstone River flows north on the eastern flank of the range. The Madison Range parallels the Gallatins to the west. The northern end of the range is near Livingston, Montana and Bozeman Pass separates the Gallatins from the Bridger Mountains to the north.

The range is an integral part of the Greater Yellowstone Ecosystem and has grizzly bears, wolves and other threatened and endangered species also found in Yellowstone National Park.

=== Gallatin Petrified Forest ===
Within the Gallatin Range, the Gallatin Petrified Forest is one of the largest petrified forests of the Eocene Epoch. The petrified wood that comprise it consist of the mineralized fossils of a mixture of transported logs and in place (in situ) wooden tree trunks rooted. The in place tree trunks are rooted in moderately developed fossil soils, (paleosols). The petrified logs, stumps, and trunks found in the Gallatin Range were buried by volcanic lahars. The lahar deposits sometimes have been reworked and redeposited by small streams. These sediments accumulated approximately 50 million year ago. The U.S. Forest Service has a 2-mile (3.2 km) long interpretive trail which details the petrified trees.

In regard to these fossil forests and other fossils, collecting of fossils in Yellowstone National Park is illegal. In addition, visitors should stay on marked and maintained trails.

Images of the Gallatin Range
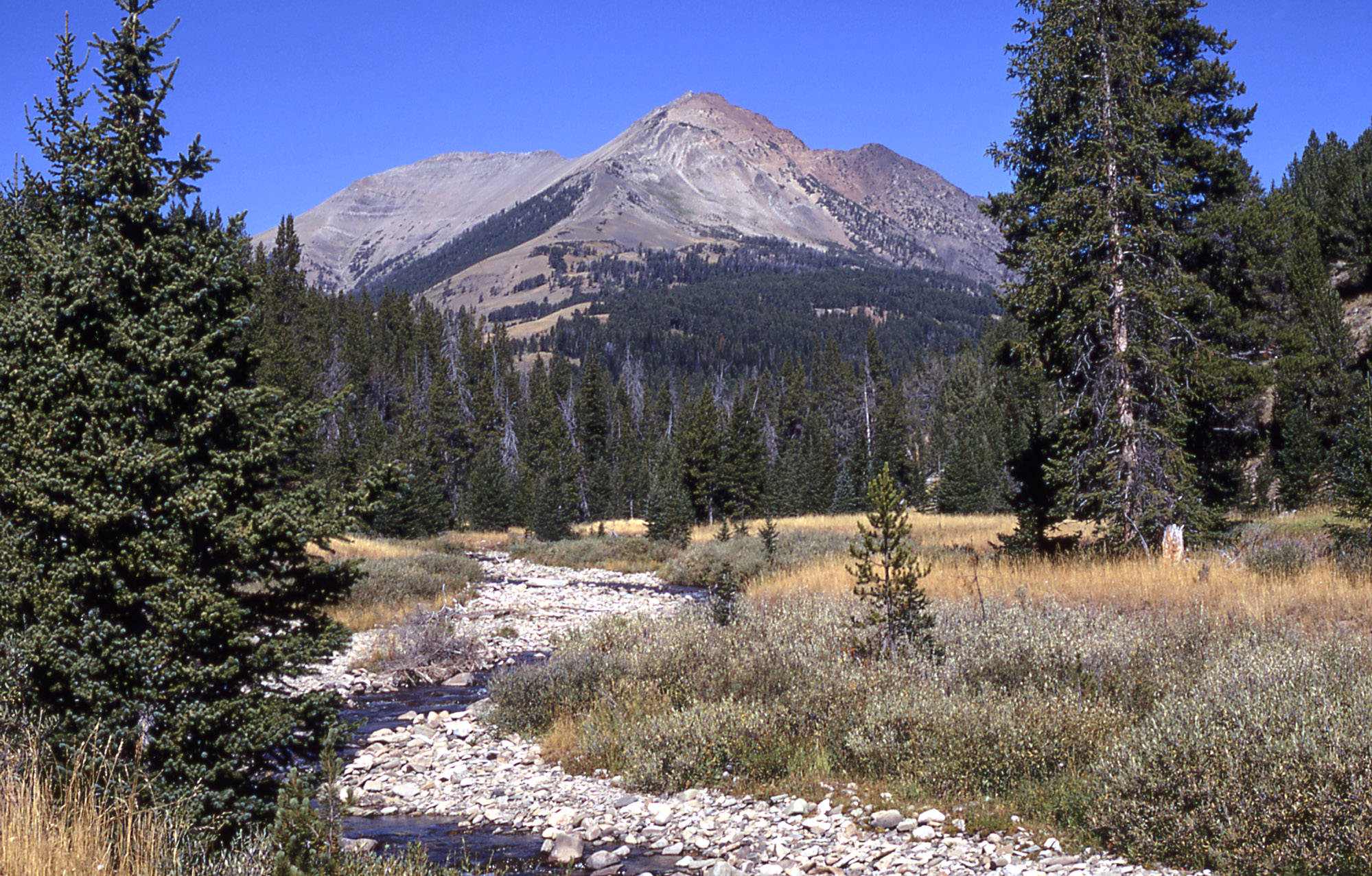
Electric Peak

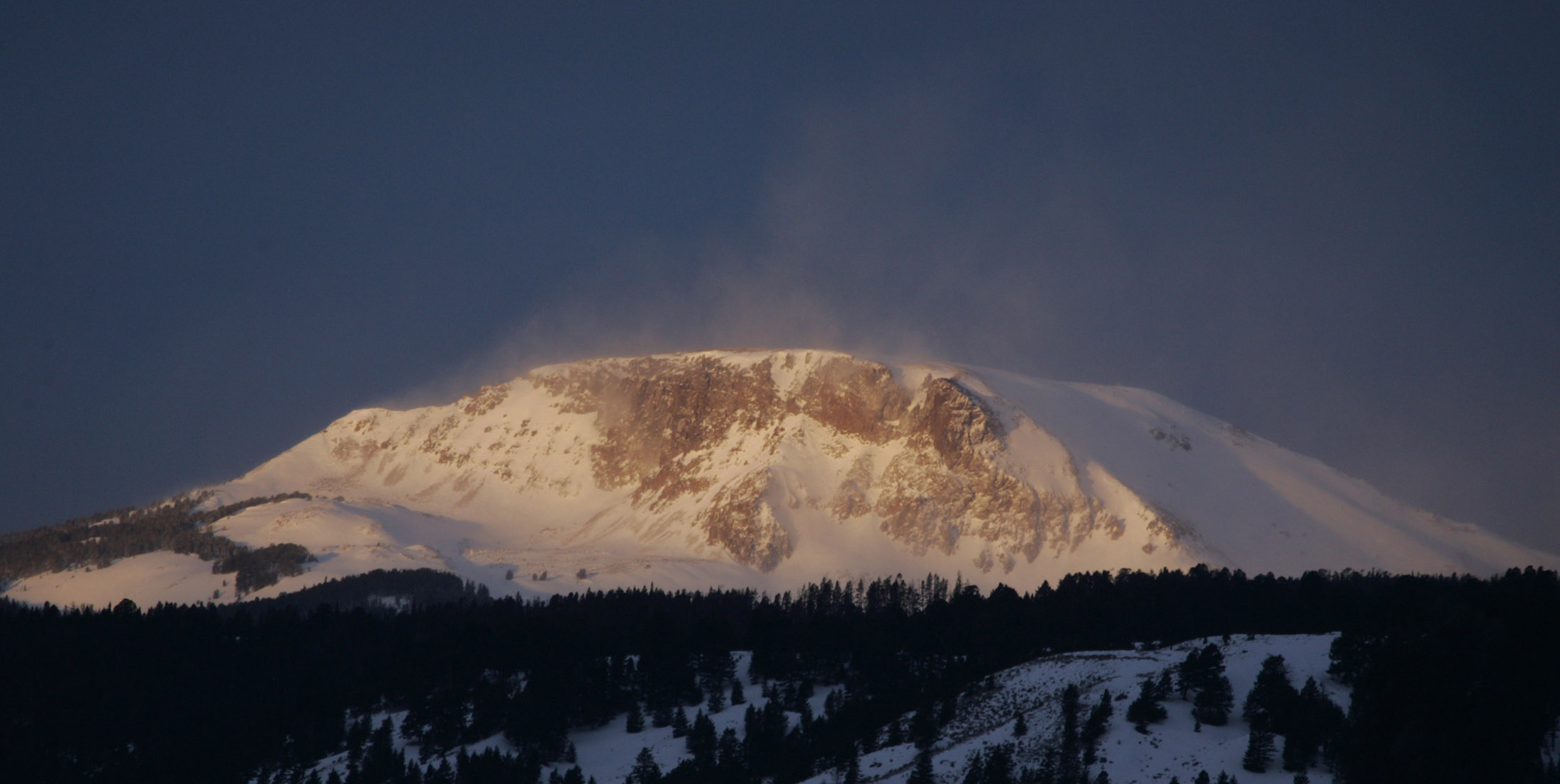
Steamboat Mountain in January 2006

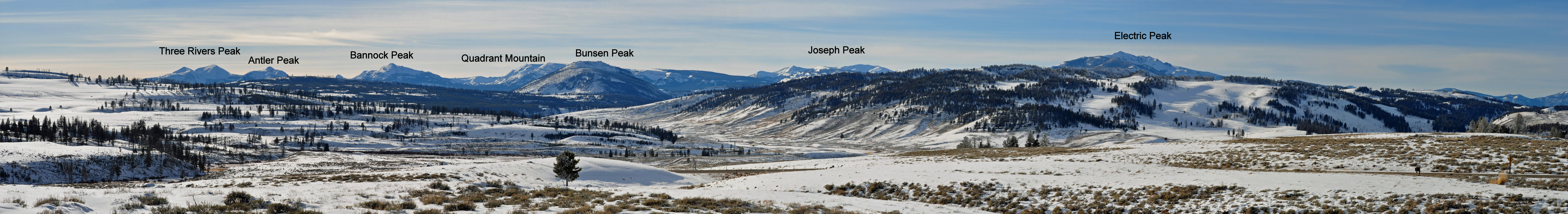
Panorama from Blacktail Plateau, Yellowstone National Park

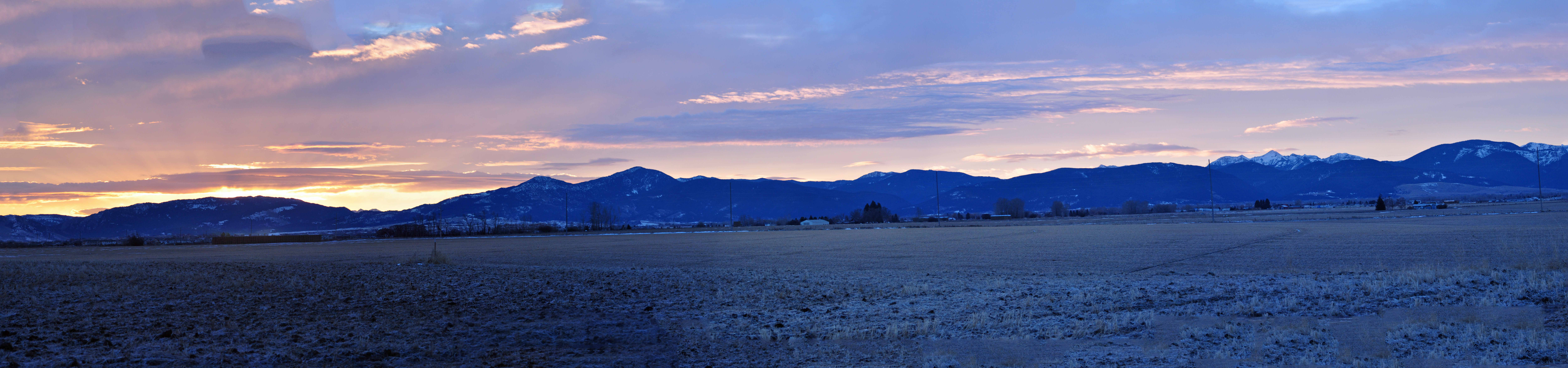
Sunrise over Gallatin Range from Bozeman, Montana

== See also ==
- Mountains and mountain ranges of Yellowstone National Park
- List of mountain ranges in Montana
- List of mountain ranges in Wyoming
