= Sulfur (disambiguation) =

Sulfur (or sulphur) is a chemical element with symbol S and atomic number 16.

Sulfur or sulphur may also refer to:

== Biology ==
- Coliadinae, a subfamily of butterflies commonly known as the sulphurs or yellows
- Dercas, a genus of Coliadinae commonly called the sulphurs
- Colias, a genus of Coliadinae commonly called the sulphurs (in North America) or clouded yellows (elsewhere)
- Phoebis, a genus of Coliadinae that is not itself called the sulphurs but that contains a number of species which are
- Eurema, a genus of Coliadinae that is not itself called the sulphurs but that contains a few species which are

== Geography ==
=== Canada ===
- Sulphur, Yukon

=== United States ===
- Sulphur, Indiana
- Sulphur, Kentucky
- Sulphur, Louisiana
- Sulphur, Nevada
- Sulphur, Oklahoma
- Sulphur, South Dakota
- Sulphur, Bowie County, Texas
- Sulphur, Trinity County, Texas
- Sulphur Peak (Utah)
- Sulphur River, in Texas and Arkansas
- Sulphur Spring, a geyser in Yellowstone National Park

=== Various ===
- Sulphur Creek (disambiguation)
- Sulphur Mountain (disambiguation)
- Sulphur Springs (disambiguation)

== Music ==
- Sulfur (band), a 1990s American rock band
- Sulfur (EP), by Gnaw Their Tongues, 2013
- "Sulfur" (song), by Slipknot, 2009
- "Sulfur", a song by Katatonia from Teargas, 2000

== Other uses ==
- Sulfur (magazine), an American literary magazine 1981–2000
- Sulfur (pharmacy), pharmaceutical uses of sulfur
- Fedora 9, codenamed Sulphur, a Linux distribution

== See also ==
- Isotopes of sulfur
- Sulfur cycle, a biogeochemical cycle
- Sulpher, a musical group composed of Rob Holliday and Steve Monti
- Sulpher, a character in the video game Mana Khemia
- S (disambiguation)
