= Dunraven =

Dunraven may refer to:

- Earl of Dunraven and Mount-Earl, title in the peerage of Ireland, held by seven earls from 1822 to 2011
- Dunraven Castle, mansion on the South Wales coast belonging to the Wyndham family and passing by marriage to the earls of Dunraven
- HMS Dunraven, British Royal Navy ship during World War I
- SS Dunraven, ship sunk in the Red Sea in 1876
- Dunraven School, London
- Dunraven, Kentucky
- Dunraven Peak, mountain peak in the Washburn Range of Yellowstone National Park, named in honour of the Fourth Earl
- Dunraven Pass, mountain pass in Yellowstone National Park, near to Dunraven Peak
- Dunraven Street, Mayfair, London, named after the Earl of Dunraven
- Dunraven, New York, a hamlet in Delaware County, New York, United States
