= Sulphur Creek =

Sulphur Creek may refer to:

== Streams ==
- Sulphur Creek (Alameda County), in California, a tributary of San Lorenzo Creek
- Sulphur Creek (California), a tributary of Aliso Creek in Orange County
- Sulphur Creek (Santa Clara County, California), a tributary of Smith Creek
- Sulphur Creek (Crane Pond Creek), a stream in Missouri
- Sulphur Creek (Cuivre River), a stream in Missouri
- Sulphur Creek (South Dakota)
- Sulphur Creek (Fremont River), a stream in Wayne County, Utah, United States
- Sulphur Creek (Washington), a tributary of the Baker River

== Settlements ==
- Sulphur Creek, Tasmania, a locality in Tasmania, Australia

== See also ==
- Sulphur Spring
- Sulphur Springs (disambiguation)
