= Sulphur Springs =

Sulphur Springs or Sulfur Springs may refer to the following locations:

- United States:
  - Sulphur Springs, Alabama
  - Sulphur Springs Valley, Arizona
  - Sulphur Springs, Arkansas (disambiguation), several locations
  - Sulphur Springs, Indiana
  - Sulphur Springs, Crawford County, Indiana
  - Sulphur Springs, Indian Territory (modern Oklahoma)
  - Sulphur Springs, Iowa
  - Sulphur Springs, Missouri
  - Sulphur Springs was an early name for the village of Clifton Springs, New York
  - Sulphur Springs, Ohio
  - Sulphur Springs, Tampa, Florida.
  - Sulphur Springs, Texas
  - Sulphur Springs Valley, in Cochise County, Arizona
  - Sulphur Springs Station Site in Carbon County, Wyoming
- Elsewhere
  - Sulphur Springs, Saint Lucia
  - Schwefelquelle Östringen, Germany.

In fiction:

- Secrets of Sulphur Springs, set in the fictional Louisiana town of Sulphur Springs

== See also ==
- Sulphur Spring
- White Sulphur Springs
- Mineral spring, of which a sulphur spring is one type
