= White Sulphur Springs =

White Sulphur Springs may refer to:

- White Sulphur Springs (California)
- White Sulphur Springs, Florida, a former name or the natural spring of White Springs, Florida
- White Sulphur Springs, Hall County, Georgia, an unincorporated community
- White Sulphur Springs, Meriwether County, Georgia, an unincorporated community
- White Sulphur Springs (Jena, Louisiana), listed on the NRHP in La Salle Parish
- White Sulphur Springs, Indiana
- White Sulphur Springs, Montana
- White Sulphur Springs, New York
- White Sulphur Springs, North Carolina
- White Sulphur Springs, West Virginia
  - White Sulphur Springs (Amtrak station)

== See also ==
- Sulphur spring
