= National Register of Historic Places listings in LaSalle Parish, Louisiana =

Location of LaSalle Parish in Louisiana

This is a list of the National Register of Historic Places listings in LaSalle Parish, Louisiana.

This is intended to be a complete list of the properties on the National Register of Historic Places in LaSalle Parish, Louisiana, United States. The locations of National Register properties for which the latitude and longitude coordinates are included below, may be seen in a map.

There are 6 properties listed on the National Register in the parish.

This National Park Service list is complete through NPS recent listings posted October 9, 2026.

== Current listings ==
	Name on the Register	Image	Date listed	Location	City or town	Description
1	Breithaupt-Moseley House		December 8, 2025 (#100012367)	150 Daisy Hill Lane; 31°37′40″N 92°02′15″W	Jena	
2	Carter-Carraway House		December 3, 2025 (#100012366)	2973 N. First Street; 31°41′13″N 92°07′57″W	Jena	
3	Good Pine Lumber Company Building	Good Pine Lumber Company Building	October 26, 1982 (#82000440)	1606 Front Street; 31°41′32″N 92°09′48″W	Jena	Also known as LaSalle Parish Museum Building and Jena Cultural Center.
4	Jena Historic District		October 9, 2026 (#100013509)	Portions of E and W Oak (Hwy 84); N and S 1st through 5th Streets; and E and W Elm Stree; 31°40′59″N 92°07′56″W	Jena	
5	Trout-Good Pine School	Trout-Good Pine School	May 20, 1999 (#99000592)	1412 School Street; 31°41′27″N 92°10′03″W	Jena Vicinity	
6	White Sulphur Springs	White Sulphur Springs	December 17, 1982 (#82000441)	Along LA 8, about 10.2 miles (16.4 km) southwest of Jena; 31°36′03″N 92°16′35″W	Jena vicinity	

== See also ==
- List of National Historic Landmarks in Louisiana
- National Register of Historic Places listings in Louisiana
