= Good Pine, Louisiana =

- Census-designated place
- Location within Louisiana Location within the United States
- Coordinates: 31°41′36″N 92°09′49″W
- Country: United States
- State: Louisiana
- Parish: La Salle

Area
  - Total: 0.78 sq mi (2.01 km^{2})
  - Land: 0.77 sq mi (1.99 km^{2})
  - Water: 0.0077 sq mi (0.02 km^{2})
- Elevation: 210 ft (64 m)

Population (2020)
  - Total: 259
  - Density: 336.6/sq mi (129.96/km^{2})
- Time zone: UTC-6 (Central (CST))
  - Summer (DST): UTC-5 (CDT)
- Area code: 318
- GNIS feature ID: 2805367

Good Pine is an unincorporated community and census-designated place (CDP) in La Salle Parish, Louisiana, United States. It was first listed as a CDP in the 2020 census with a population of 259.

Good Pine is located on U.S. Route 84, 1.8 miles (2.9 km) west-northwest of downtown Jena but much of the area has been annexed so it is increasingly a neighborhood of Jena. The Good Pine Lumber Company Building and the Trout-Good Pine School, which are both listed on the National Register of Historic Places, are located in Good Pine.

== Demographics ==
Historical population
Census	Pop.	Note	%±
2020	259		—
U.S. Decennial Census; 2020

Good Pine first appeared as a census designated place in the 2020 U.S. census.

=== 2020 census ===
Good Pine CDP, Louisiana – Demographic Profile (NH = Non-Hispanic)
Race / Ethnicity	Pop 2020	% 2020
White alone (NH)	138	53.28%
Black or African American alone (NH)	104	40.15%
Native American or Alaska Native alone (NH)	1	0.39%
Asian alone (NH)	3	1.16%
Pacific Islander alone (NH)	0	0.00%
Some Other Race alone (NH)	0	0.00%
Mixed Race/Multi-Racial (NH)	9	3.47%
Hispanic or Latino (any race)	4	1.54%
Total	259	100.00%

Note: the US Census treats Hispanic/Latino as an ethnic category. This table excludes Latinos from the racial categories and assigns them to a separate category. Hispanics/Latinos can be of any race.
