= Dunraven Peak =

Mountain in the American state of Wyoming

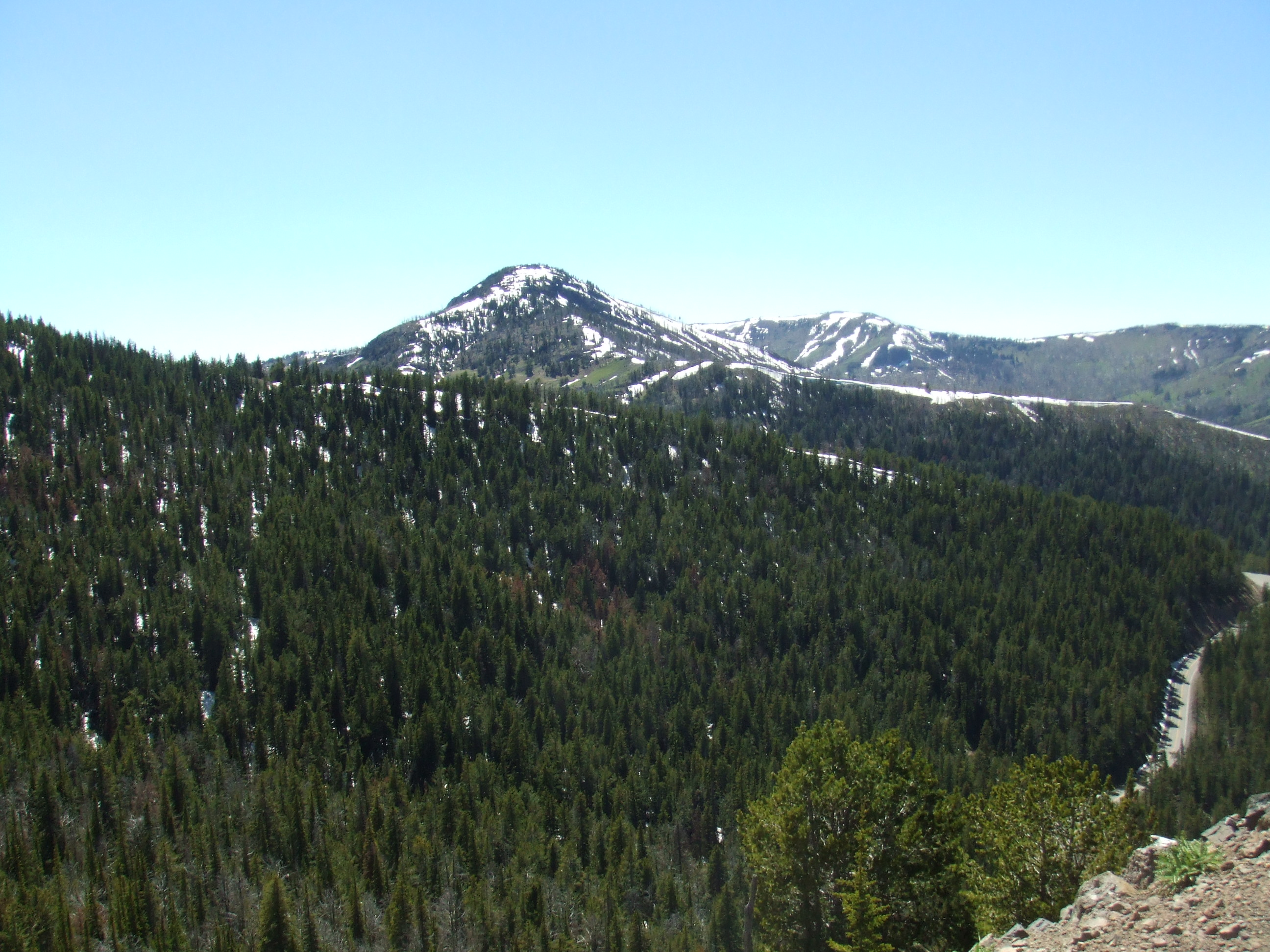
- Dunraven Peak (center), viewed from the Mount Washburn trail

Highest point
- Elevation: 9,869 ft (3,008 m)
- Coordinates: 44°46′58″N 110°28′10″W

Geography
- Location within Wyoming
- Location: Yellowstone National Park, Park County, Wyoming
- Parent range: Washburn Range
- Topo map: Mount Washburn

Dunraven Peak el. 9,869 feet (3,008 m) is a mountain peak in the Washburn Range of Yellowstone National Park. In 1874, just two years after the park's creation, The 4th Earl of Dunraven and Mount-Earl, an Anglo-Irish peer, made a visit to Yellowstone in conjunction with a hunting expedition led by Texas Jack Omohundro to the Northern Rockies. Lord Dunraven was so impressed with the park, that he devoted well over 150 pages to Yellowstone in his The Great Divide, published in London in 1874. The Great Divide was one of the earliest works to praise and publicize the park.

In 1878, during a U.S. Geological Survey of the park, Henry Gannett, a geographer working with the survey, named a peak just two miles southwest of Mount Washburn in honor of Lord Dunraven and the service his book had done for the park. In 1879, Philetus Norris, the park Superintendent, gave a pass on the Grand Loop Road between Tower and Canyon the name Dunraven Pass because of its proximity to Dunraven Peak.

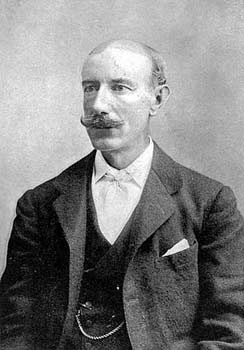
Dunraven Peak's namesake, Lord Dunraven, an Irish nobleman.

== See also ==
- Mountains and mountain ranges of Yellowstone National Park
