= Trout-Good Pine School =

- U.S. National Register of Historic Places
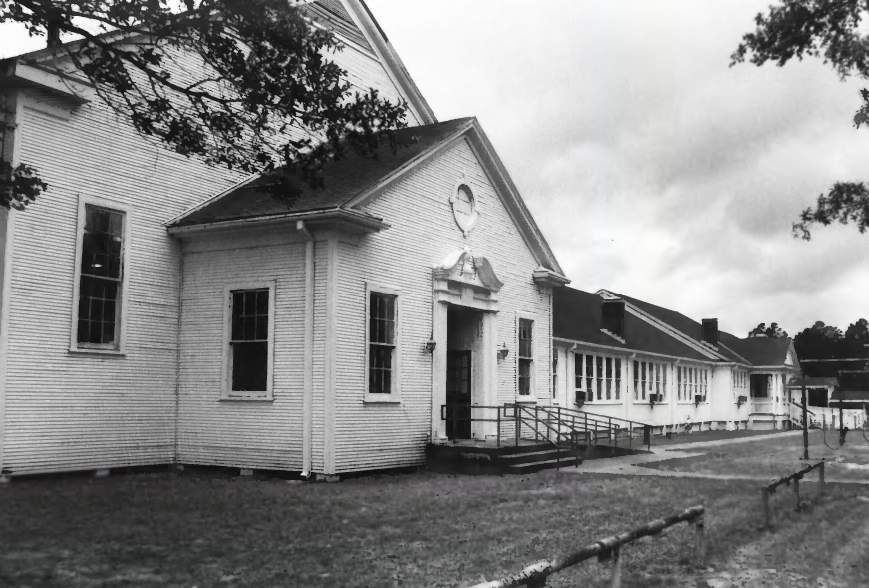

- Location within Louisiana Location within the United States
- Location: 1412 School Street, Jena, Louisiana
- Coordinates: 31°41′27″N 92°10′03″W
- Area: 2 acres (0.81 ha)
- Built: 1938
- Built by: Gremillion Brothers
- Architectural style: Colonial Revival
- NRHP reference No.: 99000592
- Added to NRHP: May 20, 1999

The Trout-Good Pine School, located at 1412 School Street in the unincorporated community of Good Pine near Jena in LaSalle Parish, Louisiana, was built in 1938. It was listed on the National Register of Historic Places on May 20, 1999.

Built by the Gremillion Brothers, it includes elements of Colonial Revival architecture at its doorways.

The school was built to replace its predecessor, which burned in a lightning-caused fire on June 27, 1937. It is significant as a well-preserved example of a school still in use in 1999 with a historic interior. It is now used as a Head Start center.

== See also ==
- National Register of Historic Places listings in LaSalle Parish, Louisiana
