= Hayden Valley =

Valley in Wyoming, United States

Coordinates: 44.643764°N 110.455352°W

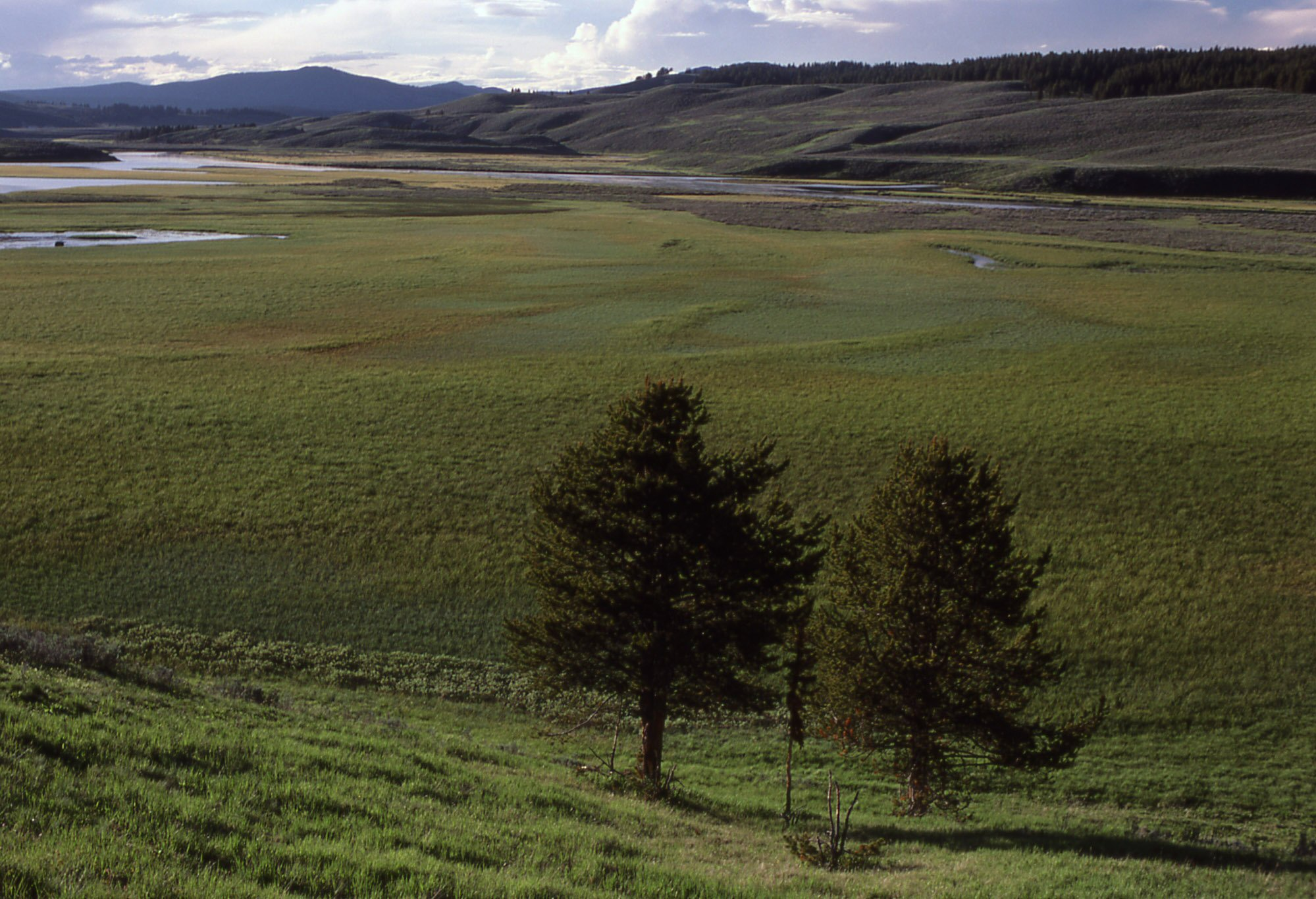
- Hayden Valley, 1977
- Interactive map of Hayden Valley
- Location: Yellowstone National Park, Wyoming
- Named for: Named for Ferdinand V. Hayden

Hayden Valley is a large, sub-alpine valley within Yellowstone National Park straddling the Yellowstone River between Yellowstone Falls and Yellowstone Lake. The valley floor along the river is an ancient lake bed from a time when Yellowstone Lake was much larger.

The valley is well known as one of the best locations to view wildlife in Yellowstone national park.

== History ==
The valley was the natural route to Yellowstone Lake as trappers, explorers and natives made their way up the Yellowstone River. On August 29, 1870, when Henry D. Washburn and Gustavus Cheyney Doane ascended Mount Washburn during the Washburn-Langford-Doane Expedition, they saw the great expanse of the Hayden Valley between Yellowstone Falls and the lake.

In Doane's journal he described the valley as seen from Mount Washburn thus:

A grassy valley, branching between low ridges, running from the river toward the center of the basin. A small stream rose in this valley, breaking through the ridges to the west in a deep cañon, and falling into the channel of the Yellowstone, which here bears in a northeast course, flowing in view as far as the confluence of the small stream, thence plunged into the Grand Cañon, and hidden from sight. No falls can be seen, but their location is readily detected by the sudden disappearance of the river; beyond this open valley the basin appears to be filled with a succession of low, converging ridges, heavily timbered, and all of about an equal altitude. To the south appears a broad sheet of water -- the Yellowstone Lake.

Although it is clear that the valley is named in honor of Ferdinand Vandeveer Hayden and his geological surveys of the Yellowstone region (as his 1871 survey led to the creation of the park), there is little definitive evidence as to who actually named the valley. Some credit the Earl of Dunraven, during his visit in 1872, but the name first appeared on maps in 1880 in an annual report from superintendent Philetus Norris.

== Location ==
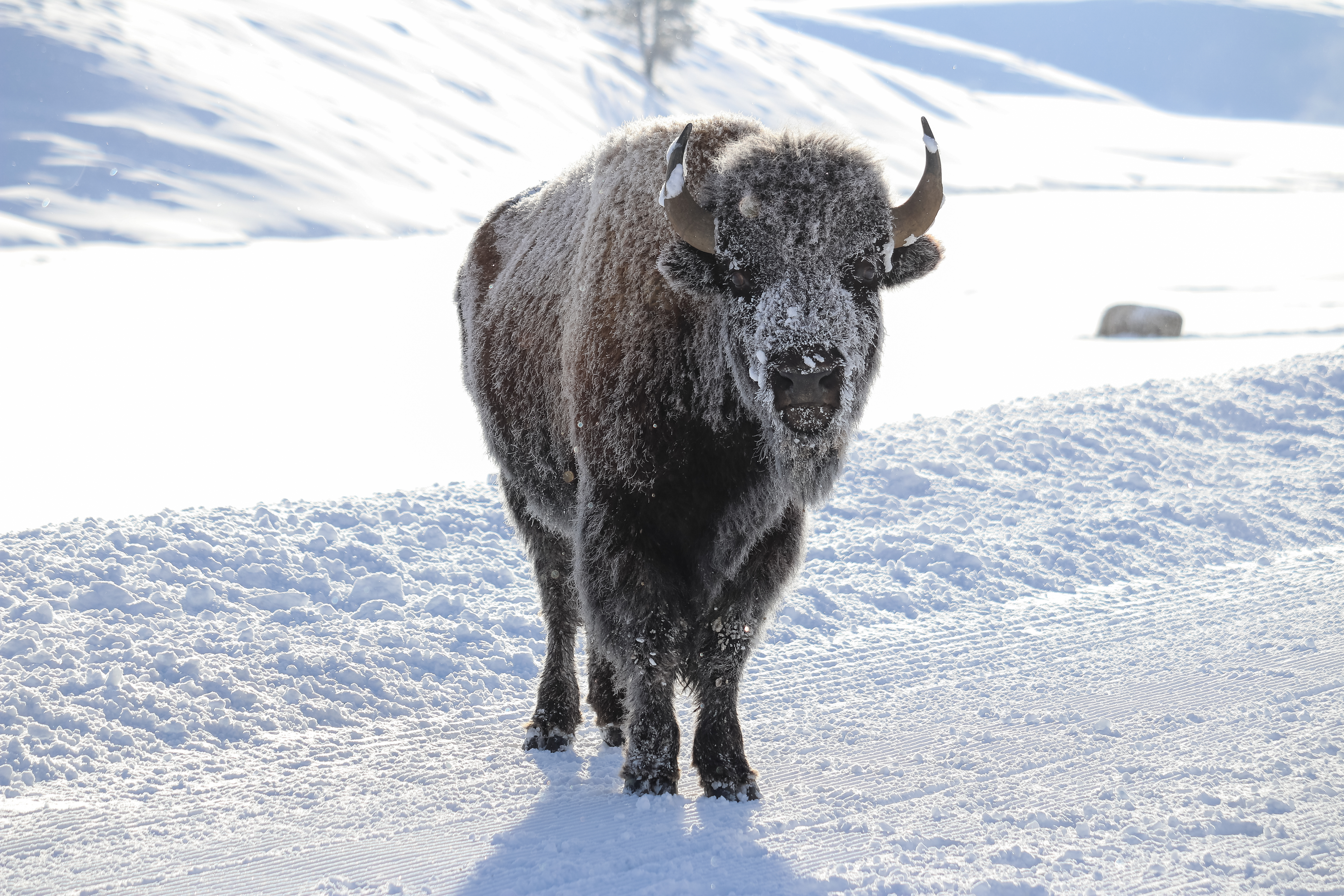
A bison in the valley in winter.

The Hayden valley, centrally located in Yellowstone National Park, is approximately 7 miles (11 km) long north to south and 7 miles (11 km) wide east to west and occupies about 50 square miles (130 km^{2}) of the park. It lies mostly to the west of the Yellowstone River between Canyon and Yellowstone Lake, in Wyoming. The Canyon to Lake section of the Grand Loop Road follows the eastern side of the valley near the river.

== Geothermal features ==
The geothermal features that are scattered around the valley are not as impressive as those of the large geyser basins, but in many case they were the first to be discovered and described by the early explorers. They include Mud Volcano, Mud Geyser, Sulphur Caldron, and Black Dragon Caldron at the southern end of the valley and Sulphur Spring in the Crater Hills group further north and west of the river.

== Sensitive habitat ==
The Hayden Valley is outstanding wildlife habitat and is frequented by plains bison, Rocky Mountain elk, grizzly bears, coyote, northwestern wolves, and a host of smaller mammals and birds. To protect this habitat and prevent disturbing wildlife, the valley is closed to off-trail foot travel. Two trails make the valley accessible for hikers—the Hayden Valley trail and the Mary Mountain trail. The valley trail parallels the river on the eastern side of the valley from Lake to Canyon, while the Mary Mountain trail skirts the northern edge of the valley along Alum Creek on its way to the Canyon-Lake road. All the rivers, creeks and ponds in the valley are closed to fishing.

Images of Hayden Valley
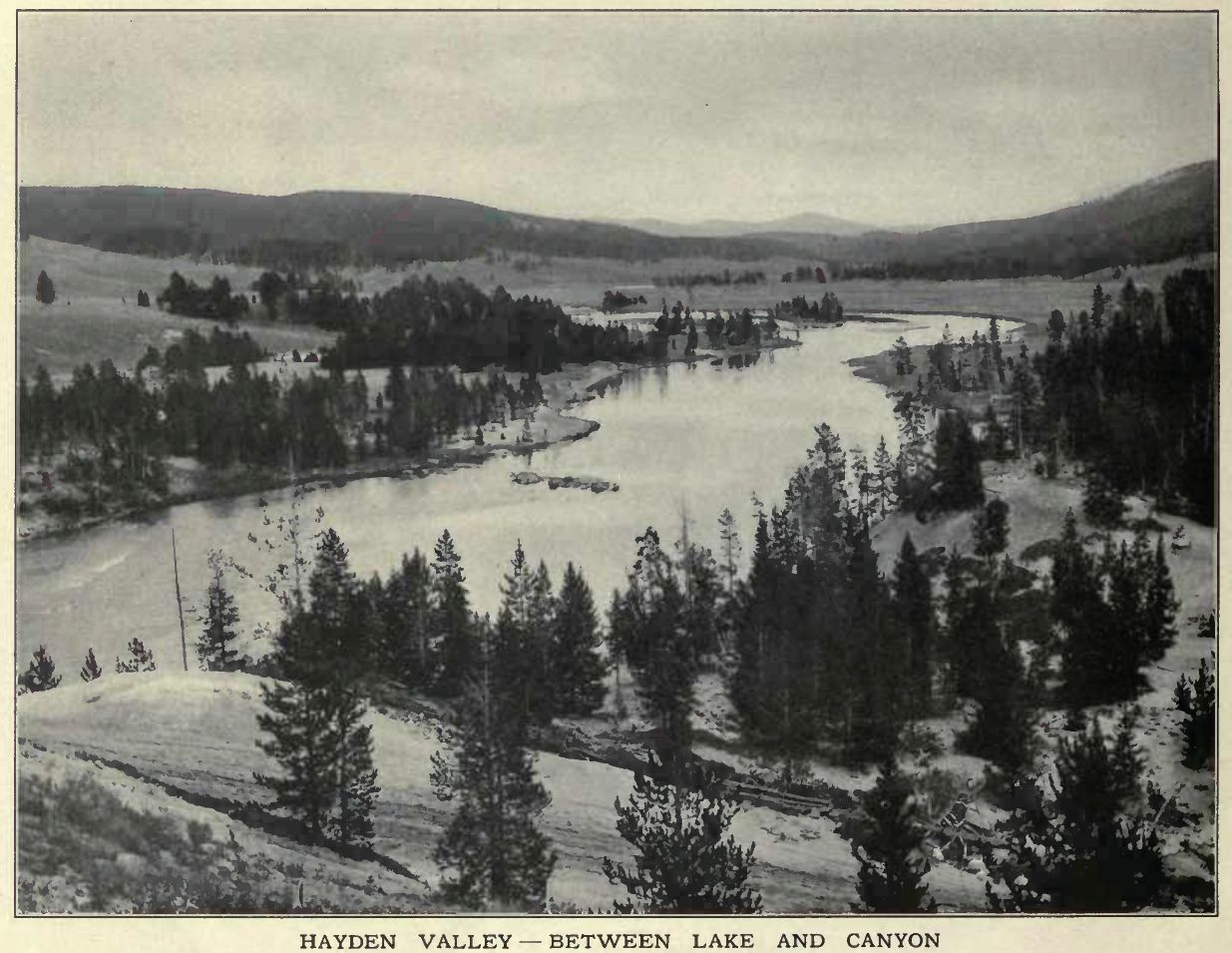
Hayden Valley, F. Jay Haynes photo, 1909

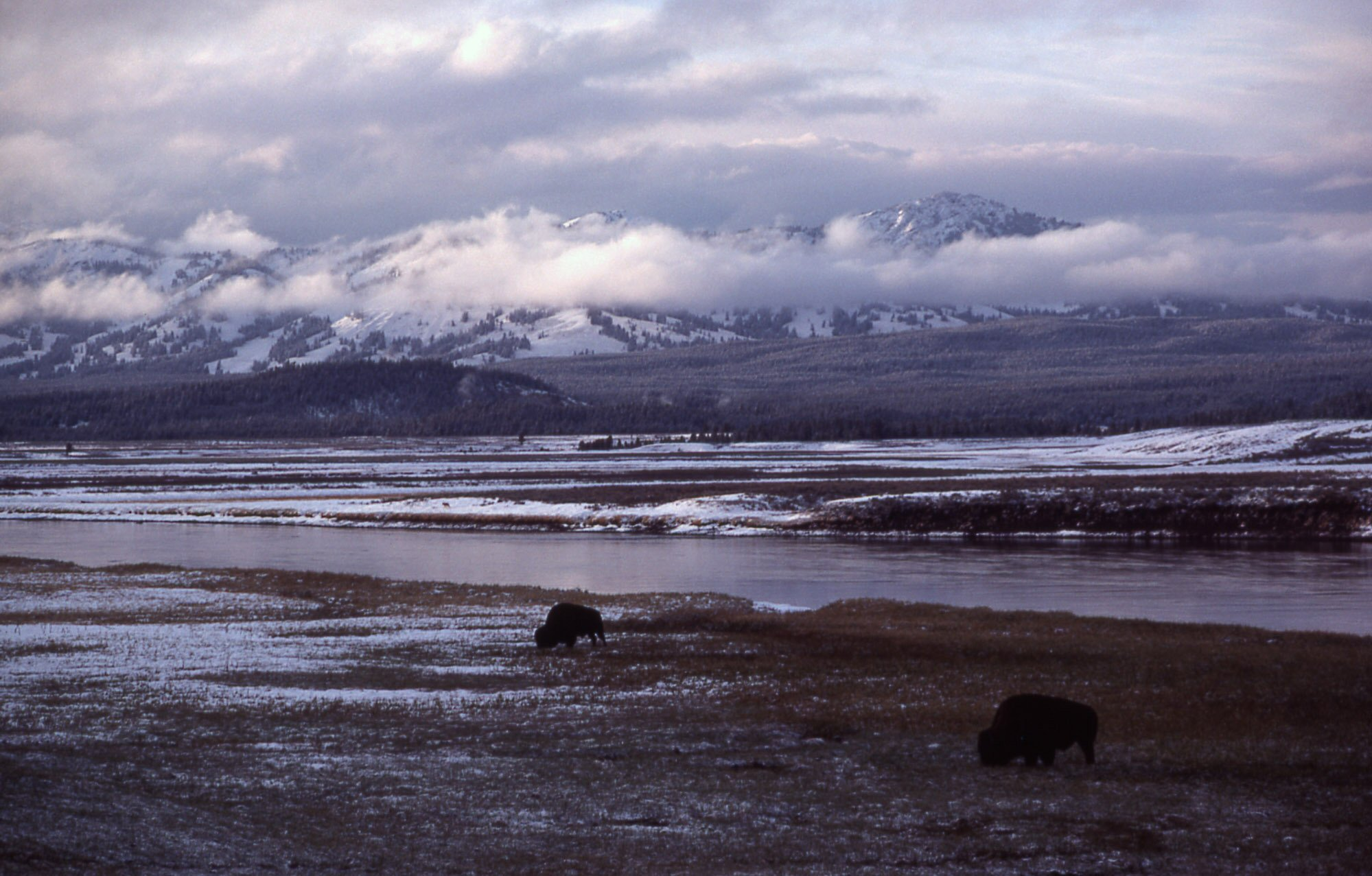
Winter 1977

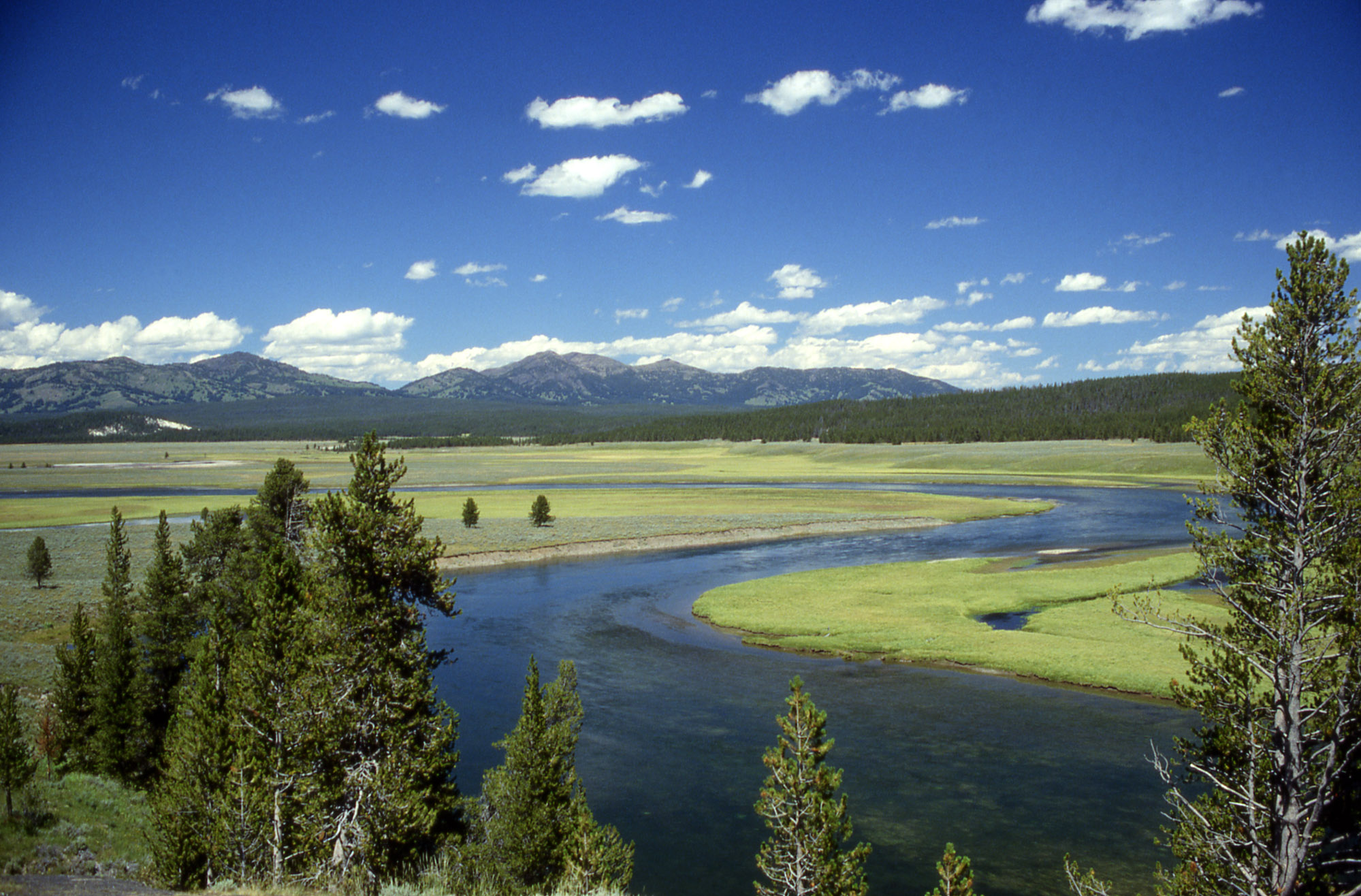
1987

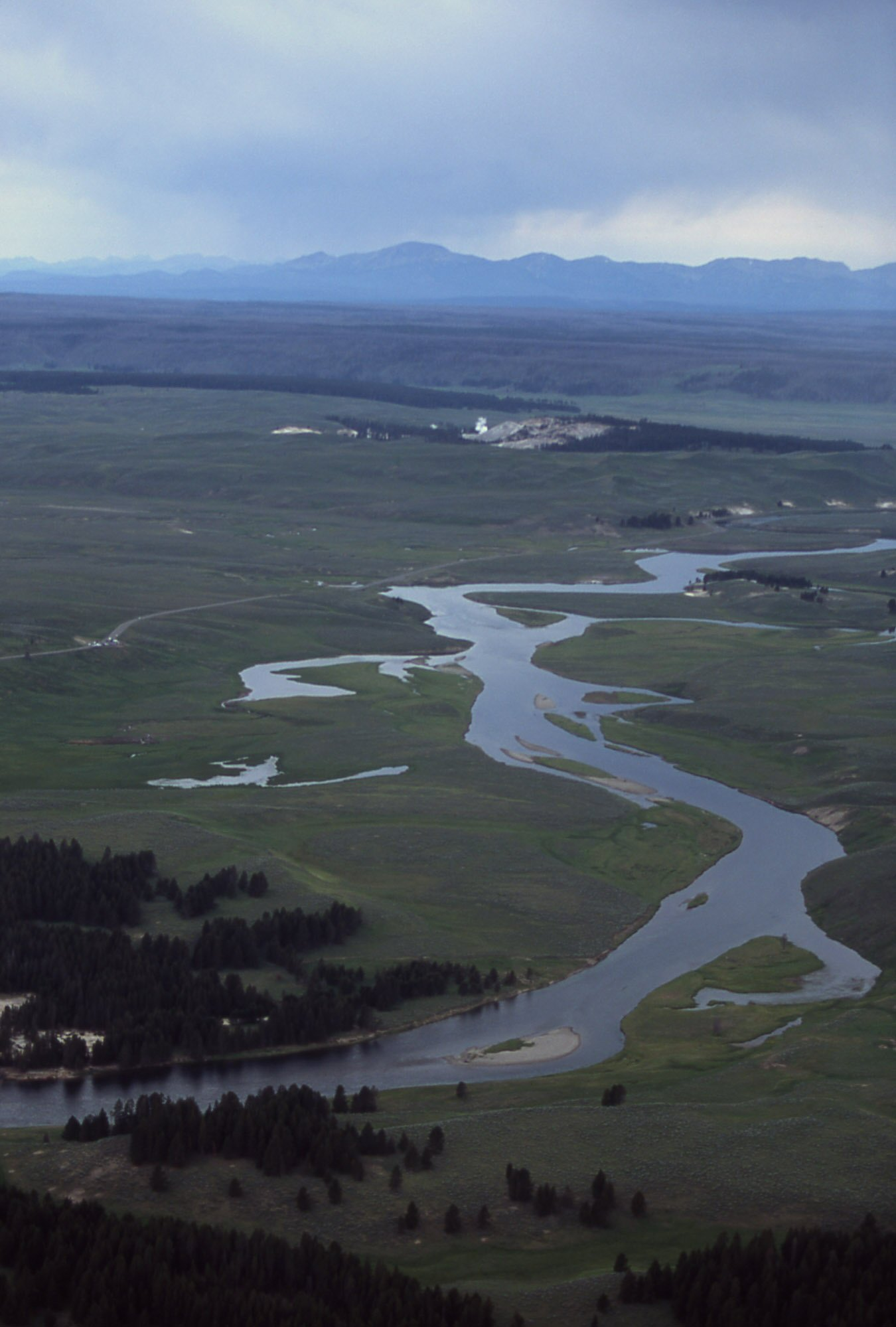
Aerial view looking north, 2001
