= Sulphur Springs, Arkansas =

Sulphur Springs, Arkansas may refer to one of seven places in Arkansas:

- Sulphur Springs, Ashley County, Arkansas, an unincorporated community in Ashley County
- Sulphur Springs, Benton County, Arkansas, a city in Benton County
- Sulphur Springs, Jefferson County, Arkansas, a census-designated place in Jefferson County
- Sulphur Springs, Johnson County, Arkansas, an unincorporated community in Johnson County, formerly Union City
- Sulphur Springs, Montgomery County, Arkansas, an unincorporated community in Montgomery County, formerly Redbird
- Sulphur Springs, Van Buren County, Arkansas, an unincorporated community in Van Buren County, formerly Morganton
- Sulphur Springs, Yell County, Arkansas, an unincorporated community in Yell County
