= Good Pine Lumber Company Building =

- U.S. National Register of Historic Places
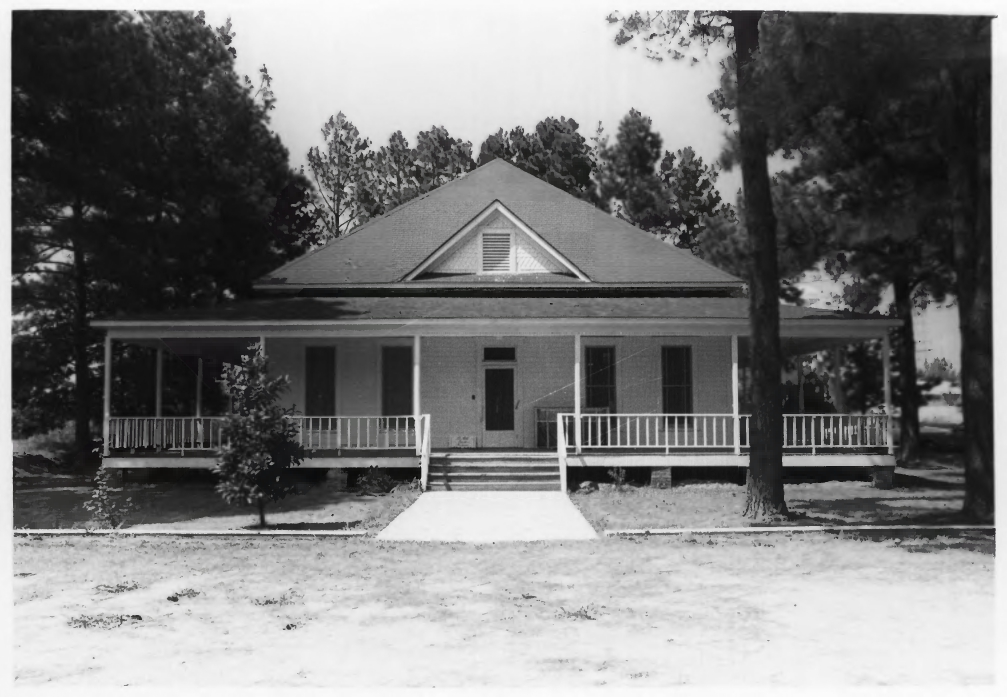

- Location within Louisiana
- Location: 1606 Front St., Jena, Louisiana
- Coordinates: 31°41′32″N 92°09′48″W
- Area: 0.3 acres (0.12 ha)
- Built: 1906
- NRHP reference No.: 82000440
- Added to NRHP: October 26, 1982

The Good Pine Lumber Company Building, at 1606 Front St. in the center of the Good Pine community within Jena, Louisiana, was built in 1906 and was listed on the National Register of Historic Places in 1982.

It is a wood frame rectangular, hipped roof building raised on brick piers. It is "almost encircled by a square post gallery, the rear portion of which was enclosed in the 1920s." Its front facade has five bays, with a transomed front door.

It has also been known as the LaSalle Parish Museum Building and as the Jena Cultural Center.

It served as headquarters for two early-twentieth century lumber companies in LaSalle Parish, the Good Pine and Tall Timber Lumber Companies. It is significant as the only surviving structure associated with the important lumber industry which has been preserved in good shape. Some workers' cottages survive but have been greatly altered; no sawmills or other related buildings survive.
