= Mount Washburn =

Mountain of the Rocky Mountains

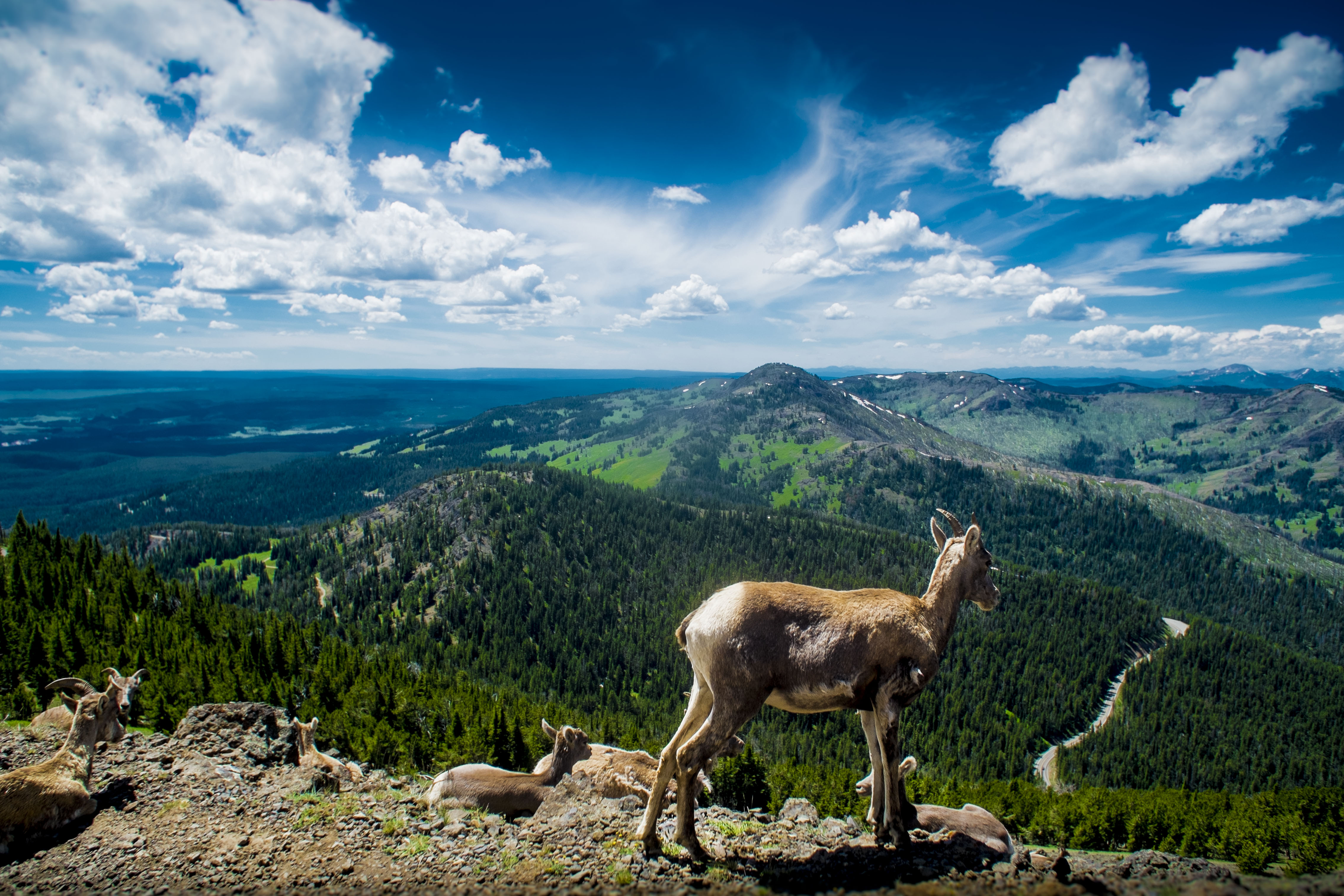

Highest point
- Elevation: 10,219 ft (3,115 m) NAVD 88
- Prominence: 2,323 ft (708 m)
- Listing: Mountains of the United States
- Coordinates: 44°47′52″N 110°26′04″W

Geography
- Location within Wyoming
- Location: Yellowstone National Park, Park County, Wyoming, United States
- Parent range: Absaroka Range
- Topo map: USGS Mount Washburn

Geology
- Mountain type: Stratovolcano
- Last eruption: 631,000 years ago (collapse eruption)

Climbing
- First ascent: August 29, 1870 (Washburn, others, first documented)
- Easiest route: Hike

Mount Washburn, elevation 10,219 feet (3,115 m), is a prominent mountain peak in the Washburn Range in Yellowstone National Park, Wyoming, United States. The peak was named in 1870 to honor Henry D. Washburn, leader of the Washburn–Langford–Doane Expedition. The Washburn Range is one of two mountains ranges completely within the boundaries of Yellowstone.

== History ==
On August 29, 1870, members of the Washburn-Langford-Doane Expedition ascended the peak they named Mount Washburn after their expedition leader, Henry D. Washburn. A portion of Lt. Gustavus Cheyney Doane's description is quoted below:

The view from the summit is beyond all adequate description. Looking northward from the base of the mountain the great plateau stretches away to the front and left with its innumerable groves and sparkling waters, a variegated landscape of surpassing beauty, bounded on its extreme verge by the cañons of the Yellowstone. The pure atmosphere of this lofty region causes every outline of tree, rock or lakelet to be visible with wonderful distinctness, and objects twenty miles away appear as if very near at hand. Still further to the left the snowy ranges on the headwaters of Gardiner's river stretch away to the westward, joining those on the head of the Gallatin, and forming, with the Elephant's Back, a continuous chain, bending constantly to the south, the rim of the Yellowstone Basin. On the verge of the horizon appear, like mole hills in the distance, and far below, the white summits above the Gallatin Valley. These never thaw during the summer months, though several thousand feet lower than where we now stand upon the bare granite and no snow visible near, save n the depths of shaded ravines. Beyond the plateau to the right front is the deep valley of the East Fork bearing away eastward, and still beyond, ragged volcanic peaks, heaped in inextricable confusion, as far as the limit of vision extends. On the east, close beneath our feet, yawns the immense gulf of the Grand Cañon, cutting away the bases of two mountains in forcing a passage through the range. Its yellow walls divide the landscape nearly in a straight line to the junction of Warm Spring Creek below. The ragged edges of the chasm are from two hundred to five hundred yards apart, its depth so profound that the river bed is no where visible. No sound reaches the ear from the bottom of the abyss; the sun's rays are reflected on the further wall and then lost in the darkness below. The mind struggles and then falls back upon itself despairing in the effort to grasp by a single thought the idea of its immensity. Beyond, a gentle declivity, sloping from the summit of the broken range, extends to the limit of vision, a wilderness of unbroken pine forest.

— Gustavus C. Doane, August 29, 1870

Mount Washburn became a very popular tourist attraction early in the park's history. Many tourist accounts tell of a trip to the summit of Mount Washburn. In 1879, Mrs. Elizabeth D. Wickes of Boulder, Montana, in a party of eight men and five ladies, spent six weeks touring the park. Her account of Mount Washburn follows:

The next day's sun found us well on our way to Mount Washburn, where we met the line of perpetual snow—it was very dirty, the snow, not the line, and we played snowball while we picked bluebells to press in our notebooks. Mount Washburn being ten thousand feet about the sea level is a station in the primary and secondary triangulation. On its rock-riven peak was a tin mustard box containing the autographs of some fifty persons, who among the many tourist since 1871, were the only ones who had sufficient time and patience to climb to the very top. If we were not with distinguished persons, our autographs were [nevertheless] placed above those of Belknap, Marcy, Schurz, Sherman, John Boyd.. and others.

— Mrs L. D. Wickes, 1879

In 1914, two years before automobiles were allowed in Yellowstone, noted author Elbert Hubbard and his wife Alice spent two weeks touring Yellowstone. In a short article written after the trip—A Little Journey to the Yellowstone Hubbard described his visit to Mount Washburn.

From the Grand Canyon of the Yellowstone to Mount Washburn is a drive of ten miles. Evidently the Government has employed the best engineers in laying out that road, and intelligent supervision has been given to its construction and maintenance. It is an exhilarating experience to drive to an altitude of over ten thousand feet above sea-level. It is not quite so interesting to walk it, although you must walk as well as ride in order to get the greatest possible benefit, for the air is crisp and light, and the walk uphill keeps blood circulating. From the tip top of Mount Washburn you can see the world in much of its glory. It is an entrancing view. You are in love with living. You want to do more of it. You plan to do big things when you get down into the work again.

— Elbert Hubbard, 1914

== Mount Washburn trails ==
Views from the summit include much of the northern section of Yellowstone National Park and on clear days, the Teton Range is also visible. The mountain trails are some of the most frequented in the park, so summer hikes can be crowded. With an altitude gain of 1,393 feet (425 m) in 3 miles (4.8 km), the hike from Dunraven Pass to the summit is moderate. Another trail that climbs 1,491 feet (454 m) in only 2.25 miles (3.62 km) starts from the Chittenden parking area.

One of three active fire lookout towers in Yellowstone is located on the summit. There is a small visitor center and restrooms on the first floor, an observation deck on the second, and a ranger's residence on the top floor (closed to the public).

== Geology ==
Mount Washburn is an ancient volcano. It collapsed in an eruption from either it or the nearby Yellowstone Caldera.

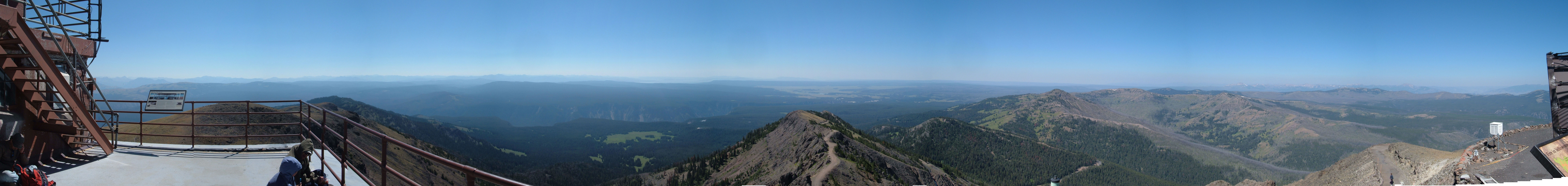
Panorama taken from the fire lookout tower on the summit of Mt. Washburn. The center of the image looks south towards the Teton Range.
Images of Mount Washburn
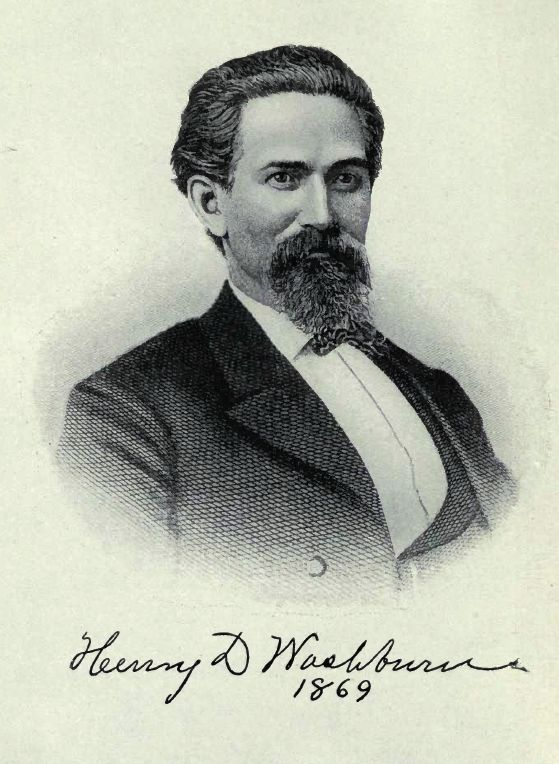
Mount Washburn's namesake, Henry D. Washburn

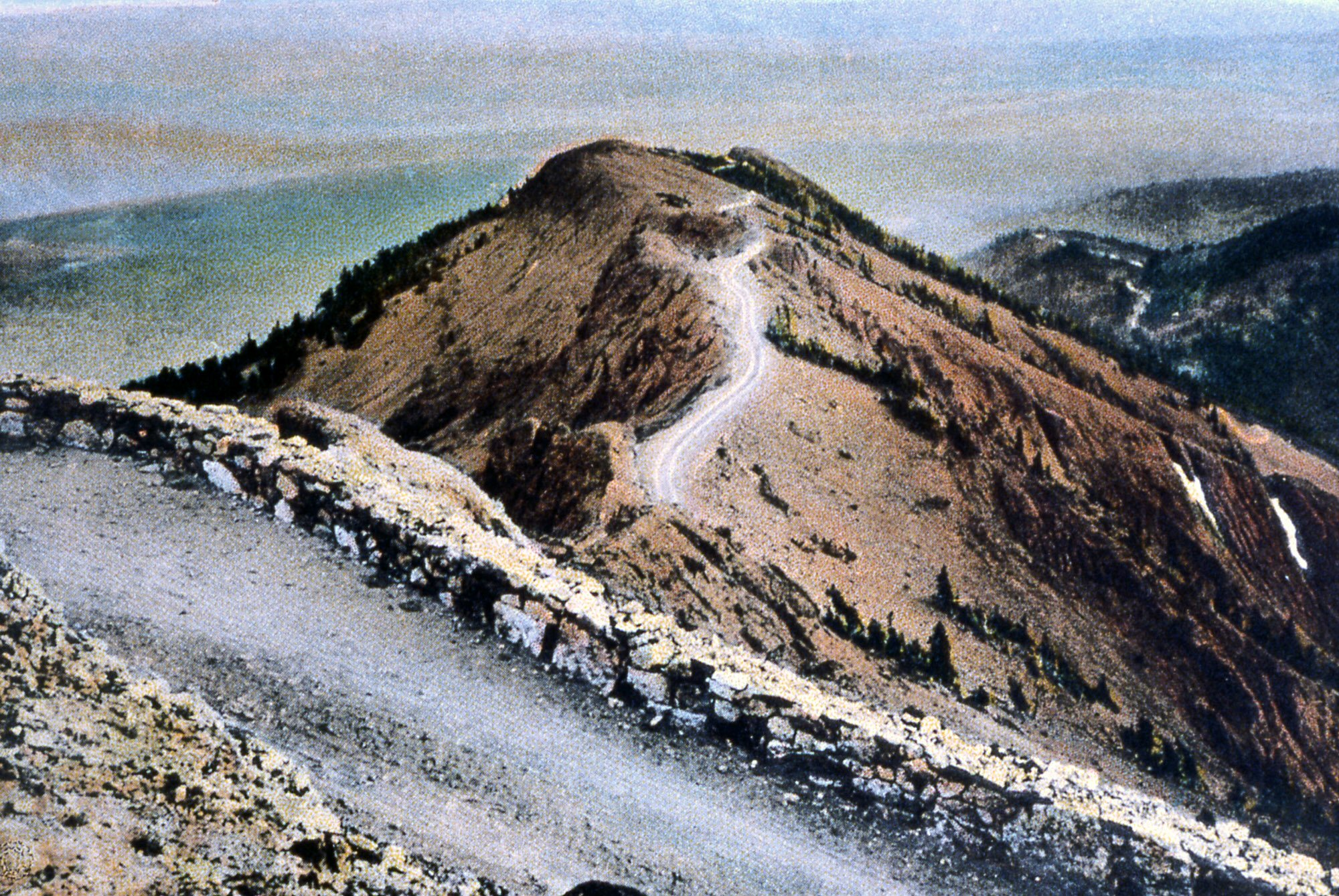
Postcard, Frank Jay Haynes

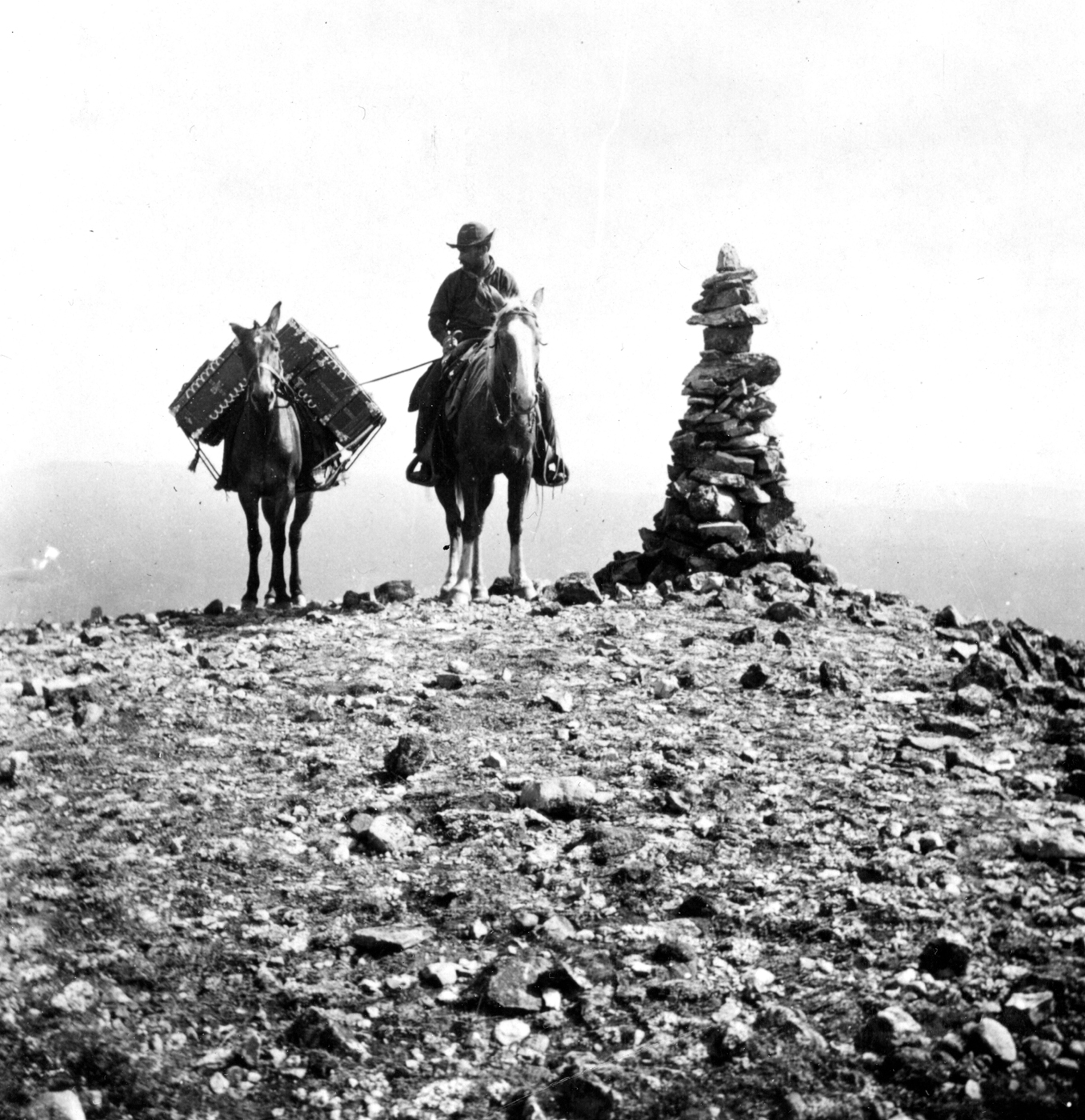
Photographer and gear atop Mount Washburn, ca 1870s William Henry Jackson

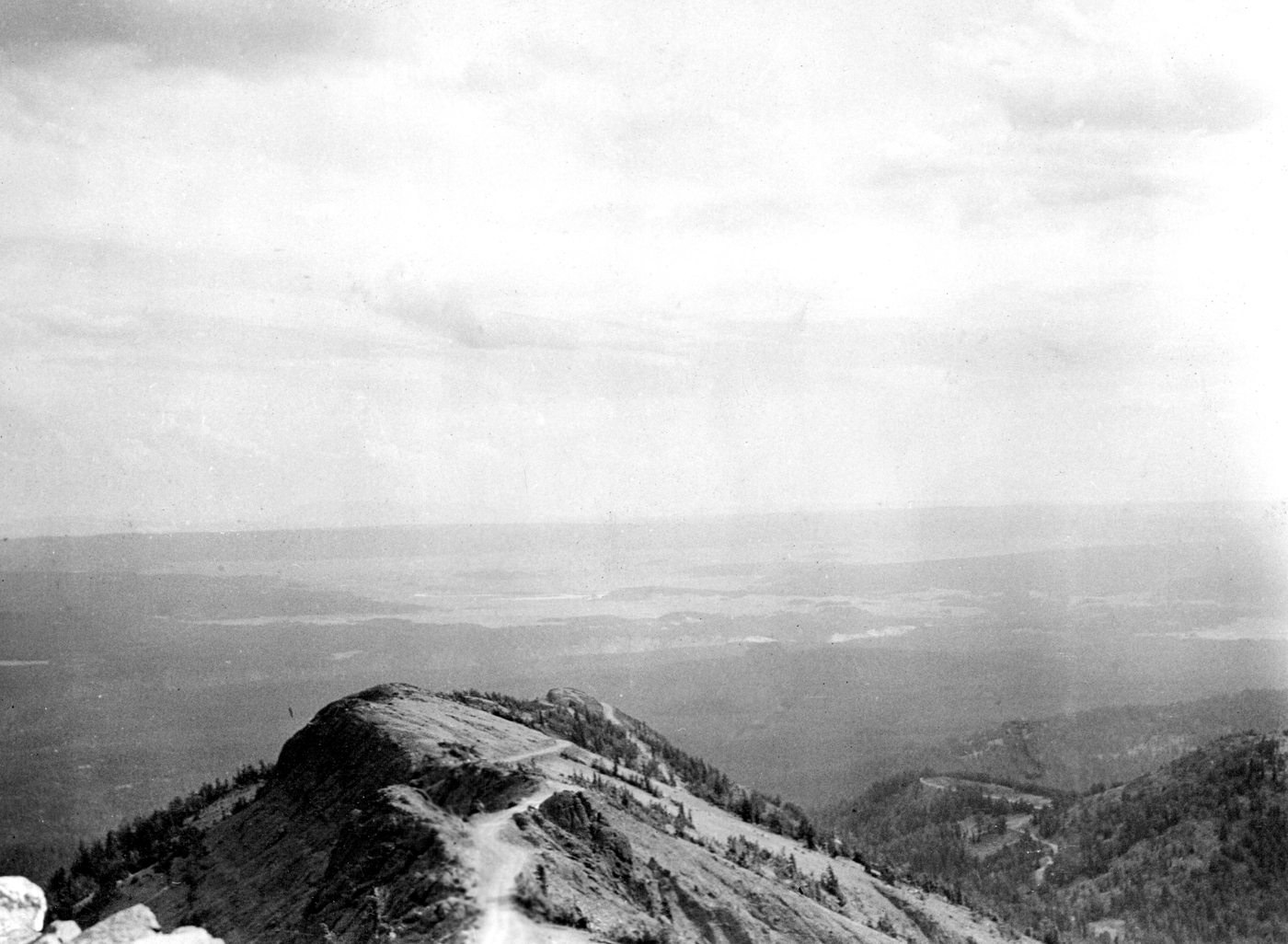
View from Mount Washburn looking south toward Hayden Valley 1931

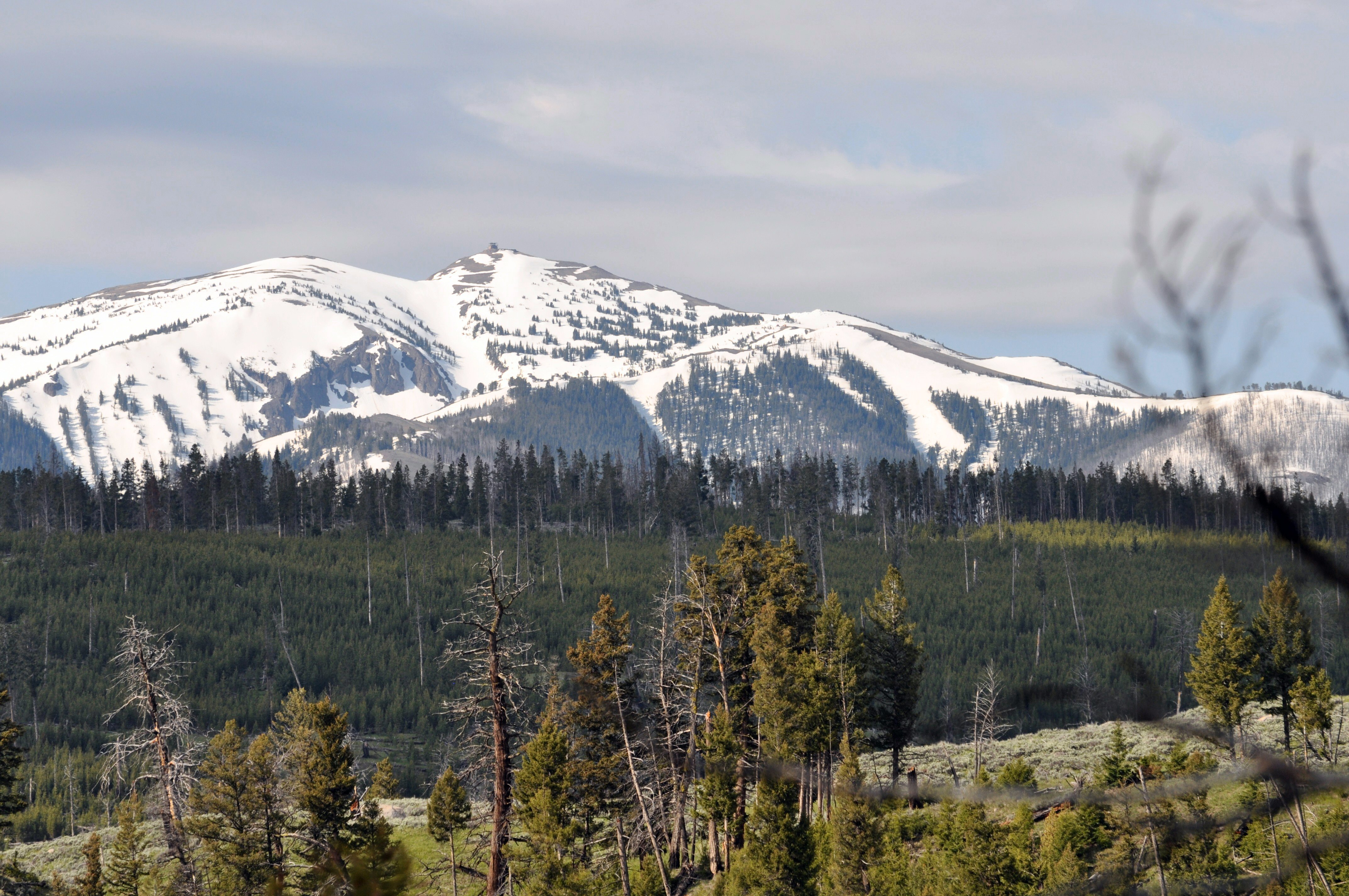
Mount Washburn from north rim of Grand Canyon of the Yellowstone, June 2011

== See also ==
- List of mountains and mountain ranges of Yellowstone National Park
