= White Sulphur Springs, Hall County, Georgia =

Unincorporated community in Georgia, U.S.

Coordinates: 34°20′00″N 83°45′01″W

White Sulphur Springs is an unincorporated community in Hall County, in the U.S. state of Georgia.

== History ==
The community was named for a mineral spa located at the town site. A variant name is "White Sulphur Spring".

White Sulphur Springs was formerly an incorporated municipality. The town's municipal charter was repealed in 1995.
