= Sweet Sulphur Springs =

Hotel and health resort in Indiana, US

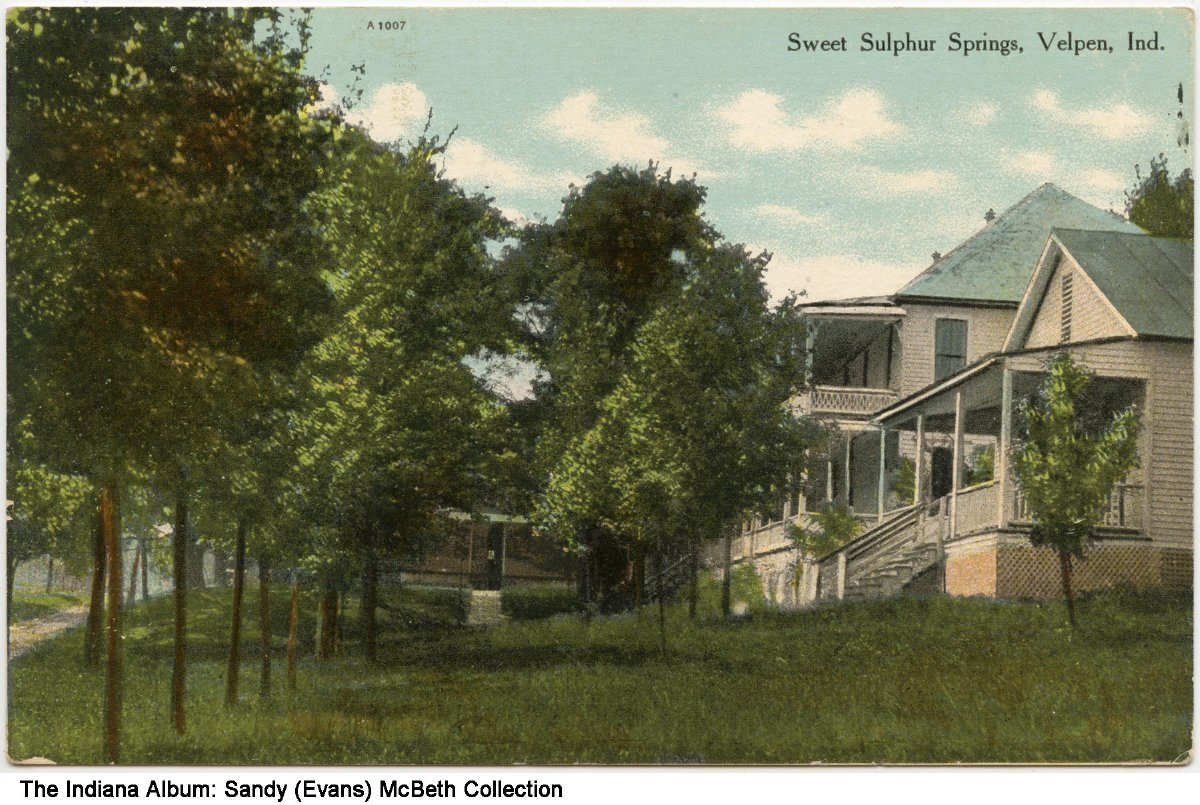
- Postcard of Sweet Sulphur Springs hotel, circa 1909
- Interactive map of the Sweet Sulphur Springs area
- Former names: White Sulphur Springs

General information
- Location: Velpen, Indiana, US
- Coordinates: 38°23′7″N 87°5′27″W
- Destroyed: 1914

Sweet Sulphur Springs, previously known as White Sulphur Springs, was a popular health resort and hotel near Velpen, Indiana, United States. Operating from the 1890s to 1914, it was renowned for the supposed medicinal properties of the sulphur springs near the hotel. For years, the springs were a popular center for visitors from neighboring cities Louisville, Kentucky, St. Louis, Missouri, and Evansville, Indiana until the hotel burned down in 1914. In 1925, businessman Paul Lewis founded Sweet Sulphur Springs Inc. in an attempt to rebuild the hotel and spur a new "Log City" on its grounds, but this plan was never realized. By 1957, the area had been abandoned and was overgrown with trees.

== History ==
The sulphur springs were said to have first been discovered by a young boy named Gabe Nelson and his father Houston Nelson in 1854. There are three springs, 100 feet (30 m) apart, all of which were reported to taste like bitter sulphur. The springs' supposed medicinal properties "attracted many visitors".

In 1891, the proprietor of the hotel was J. G. Scott, noted as refurnishing the hotel, then known as "White Sulphur Springs". Scott sold the property to T. Herbig in February 1892, who later ran an advertisement describing it as a "great health resort" where the water would cure 'dyspepsis' and heal other ailments. In March 1895, Herbig sold the springs to "some gentlemen from Louisville". In July 1895, Fisher and Becker were named as the proprietors of the "Sweet Sulphur Springs", and they advertised the property as under new management, reportedly in 25 newspapers in southern Indiana. Proprietor Charles Fisher died in 1900 and the property was then inherited by his son Edward Fisher. The hotel burned down on June 10, 1914, costing an estimated $25,000 in damages. The property was purchased by the Chambers Brothers in 1925, with the intent of rebuilding the hotel and restoring it to its former glory.

== Hotel ==
The Indiana Statistics Bureau reported in 1898 that the hotel had a capacity of 100 and received 450 guests annually. Later reports describe the hotel as being able to accommodate up to 80 guests in 40 rooms. It had six bathrooms and a bath house. The water from the springs was pumped by a gasoline engine into tanks to supply the hotel. The hotel also had amenities such as a pool, billiard room, dining hall, croquet and picnic grounds, dancing hall and bowling alley. In 1903, geologist Willis Blatchley reported that the hotel operated from June 1 to October 1.

During its operation, it became a popular destination in the region, with visitors traveling from Louisville, St. Louis and Evansville, as well as other points on the 'Air Line' Railway. The resort was said to have waters equal to those at French Lick, a nearby resort in Orange County, Indiana. The main attraction of the hotel was the supposed medicinal property of the water, but "big meetings" were said to have taken place at the hotel as well.

The hotel burned down around (Note: One article reports that the fire was discovered at 2:00PM while another reports 2:30PM) 2 p.m. on June 10, 1914, the result of a fire starting in the kitchen. The Huntingburgh Independent reported that the fire was caused by a 'defective kitchen flue' and that by the time the fire had been discovered, it had spread too far to extinguish. The hotel was estimated with a value of $25,000, but was only insured for $10,000 and owners Mr. and Mrs. Charles Fisher never rebuilt the hotel.

== Log City ==
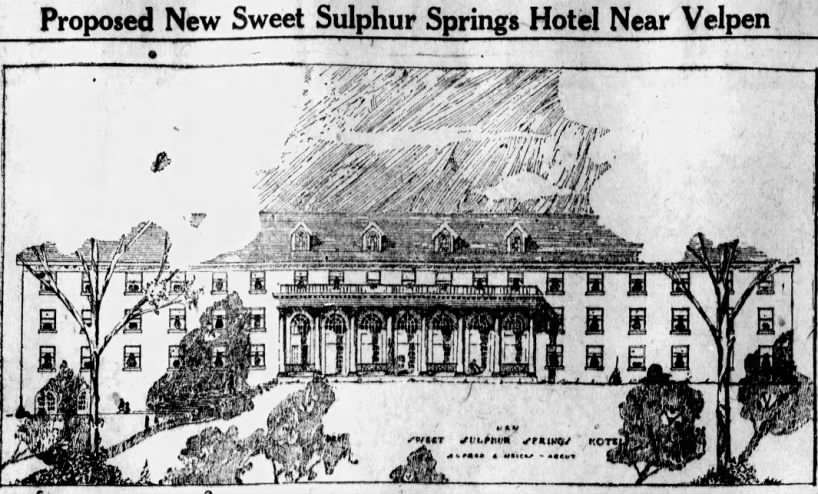
Sketch of proposed new Sweet Sulphur Springs hotel from The Evansville Journal, October 4, 1925

In 1925, Paul Lewis and the Chambers Brothers formed the Sweet Sulphur Springs Inc. company with hopes to rebuild the hotel and purchased the property where the old Sweet Sulphur Springs resort had burned down. The plan was to build a three-story, year-round brick hotel with over 100 rooms. Planned amenities included golf links, tennis courts, electrical baths and a bathing beach. By 1927, they advertised their plan to start a new town called "Log City" at the site of Sweet Sulphur Springs by selling lots to fund the new town. On May 3, 1927, ex-mayor of Indianapolis Lew Shank was set to auction off 152 lots for residences in the proposed city. However, it quickly became apparent that most visitors to the area didn't want to spend money on lots, but rather on the food and music. Only two lot buyers ended up building residences on their lots, and the lake in the area was drained. The area became covered with foliage and in 1956 Wayne Guthrie described it as a "two-acre meadow".
