= Sulphur Mountain =

Sulphur Mountain may refer to:

- Sulphur Mountain (Alberta) in Banff National Park, Alberta, Canada
- Sulphur Mountain Cosmic Ray Station, a National Historic Site of Canada found atop Sulphur Mountain in Banff National Park
- Sulphur Mountain Formation, a geologic formation of Early to Middle Triassic age
