= Sulphur Creek (Cuivre River tributary) =

Stream in the American state of Missouri

Sulphur Creek is a stream in Lincoln and Pike counties of Missouri. It is a tributary of the North Fork Cuivre River.

The headwaters are at in Pike County 39°15′21″N 91°09′37″W and the confluence is in northwest Lincoln County approximately three miles west of Silex at 39°09′32″N 91°07′24″W.

Sulphur Creek was so named due to reports of sulphur in area springs.

== See also ==
- List of rivers of Missouri
