= Schwefelquelle Östringen =

Spring near Östringen, Germany

Coordinates: 49.226978°N 8.710927°E

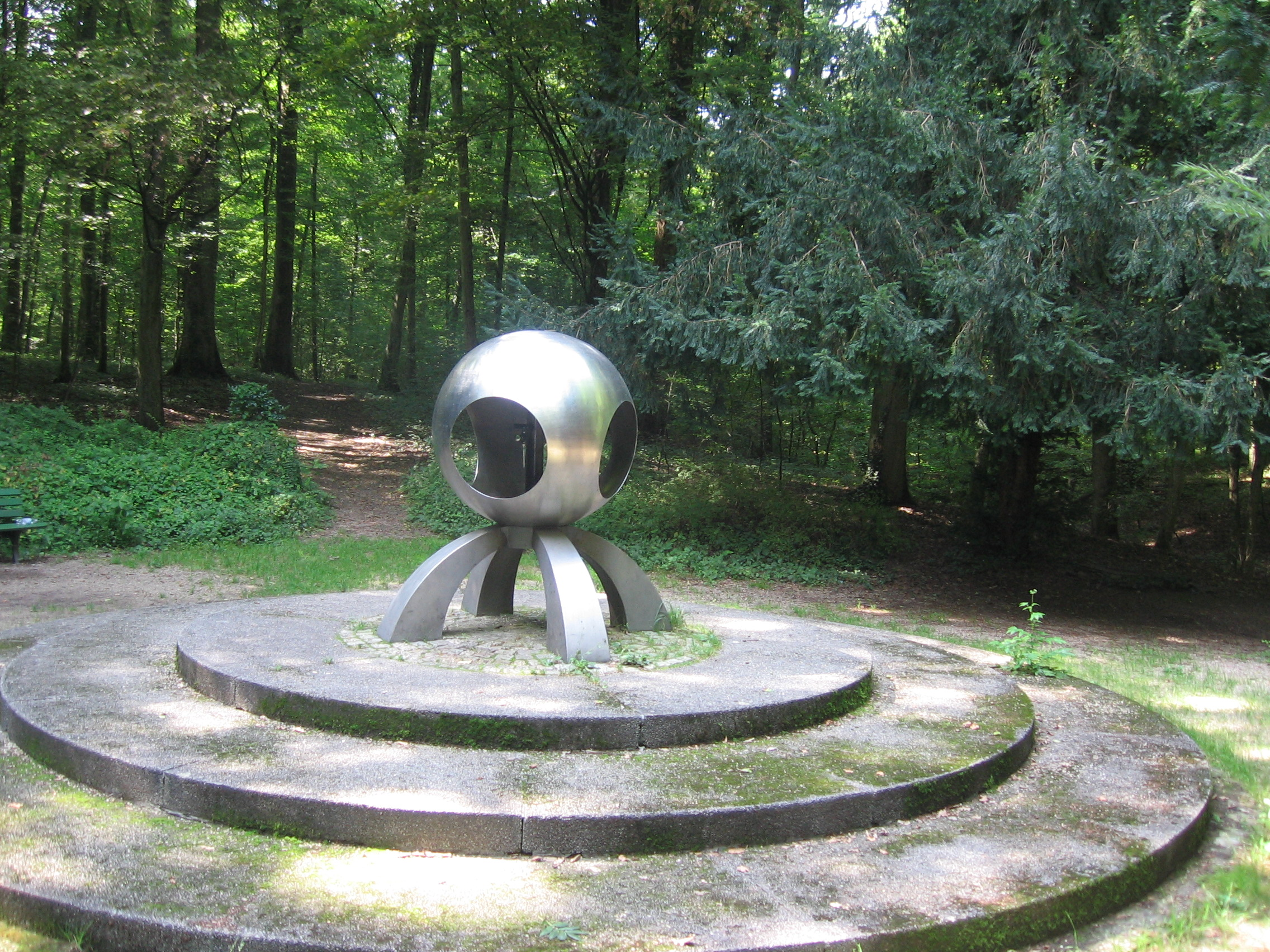
Sulfur spring Östringen, Germany

In the Krummbachwald near Östringen (district of Karlsruhe) there is the enclosed, publicly accessible sulfur spring Östringen, whose water is said to have healing powers and support the immune system. As with the medicinal springs in Bad Mingolsheim and Bad Schönborn, the spring is made up of dissolved, sulfur-containing sodium hydrogen carbonate (Na-HCO_{3}) from the rock (Black Jura). The water comes from the bituminous slate of the Langenbrücken depression. This is the deepest part of the Kraichgaumulde landscape between Ubstadt and Malsch, which extends in an easterly direction to Östringen. When the rock containing pyrites (pyrite) is weathered, the oxidation of the pyrite with subsequent bacterial reduction of the sulfate ion produces hydrogen sulfide (H_{2}S ). It gives the mineral water the smell of rotten eggs. In contrast to the healing springs in Bad Schönborn and Bad Mingolsheim, which are pumped from a depth of over 40 °C from a depth of 600 m, the water of the Östringen sulfur spring is cold. It contains 1.5 g / l dissolved substances and 30 mg / l hydrogen sulfide. Visitors who regularly drink from it should note that the daily intake of hydrogen sulfide does not exceed the limit of 100 mg.

The well was built in 1960 in the hope of using the medicinal water economically. The dream of Östringen as a spa town "Bad Östringen" failed, however. A sign at the “Am Fischbach” forest car park, next to district road 3521 (Rettigheimer Straße), shows the approx. 400 m long path through the forest. The futuristic design of the fountain and its circular platform in the middle of the closed forest area give the location an extraordinary appearance. Several benches on site invite you to linger. It is advisable to bring a drinking cup with you. Water withdrawal is not possible in the winter months.

== Literature ==
- Alberti, J. et al. (2018): Östringen vom Dorf zur Stadt. Stadt Östringen (Hrsg.), Verlag Regionalkultur, Ubstadt-Weiher, 228 S., ISBN 978-3-95505-114-3.
- Carle, W. (1975): Die Mineral- und Thermalwässer von Mitteleuropa. 643 S.; Stuttgart (Wiss. Verlagsgesellschaft).
- Schöttle, M. (1984): Geologische Naturdenkmale im Regierungsbezirk Karlsruhe.-Eine Zusammenstellung geschützter und schutzwürdiger geologischer Objekte. Beih. Veröff. Naturschutz Landschaftspflege Bad. Württ., 38, 1–171, Karlsruhe.
- J. Schroeter: Der Schwefel in der Medizin und in der älteren Chemie. In: Ciba Zeitschrift. Band 9, Nr. 98 (Der Schwefel) 1945, S. 3497–3502.
- Schweitzer, V. & R. Kraatz (1982): Kraichgau und südlicher Odenwald, Verlag Gebr. Borntraeger, 203 S.

== Web-Links ==
- Stadt Östringen
