= Sulphur, South Dakota =

Coordinates: 44°52′36″N 102°54′49″W

Sulphur is an extinct town in Meade County, in the U.S. state of South Dakota.

== History ==
A post office called Sulphur was established in 1906, and remained in operation until 1958. The town took its name from Sulphur Creek.
