= Dunraven Pass =

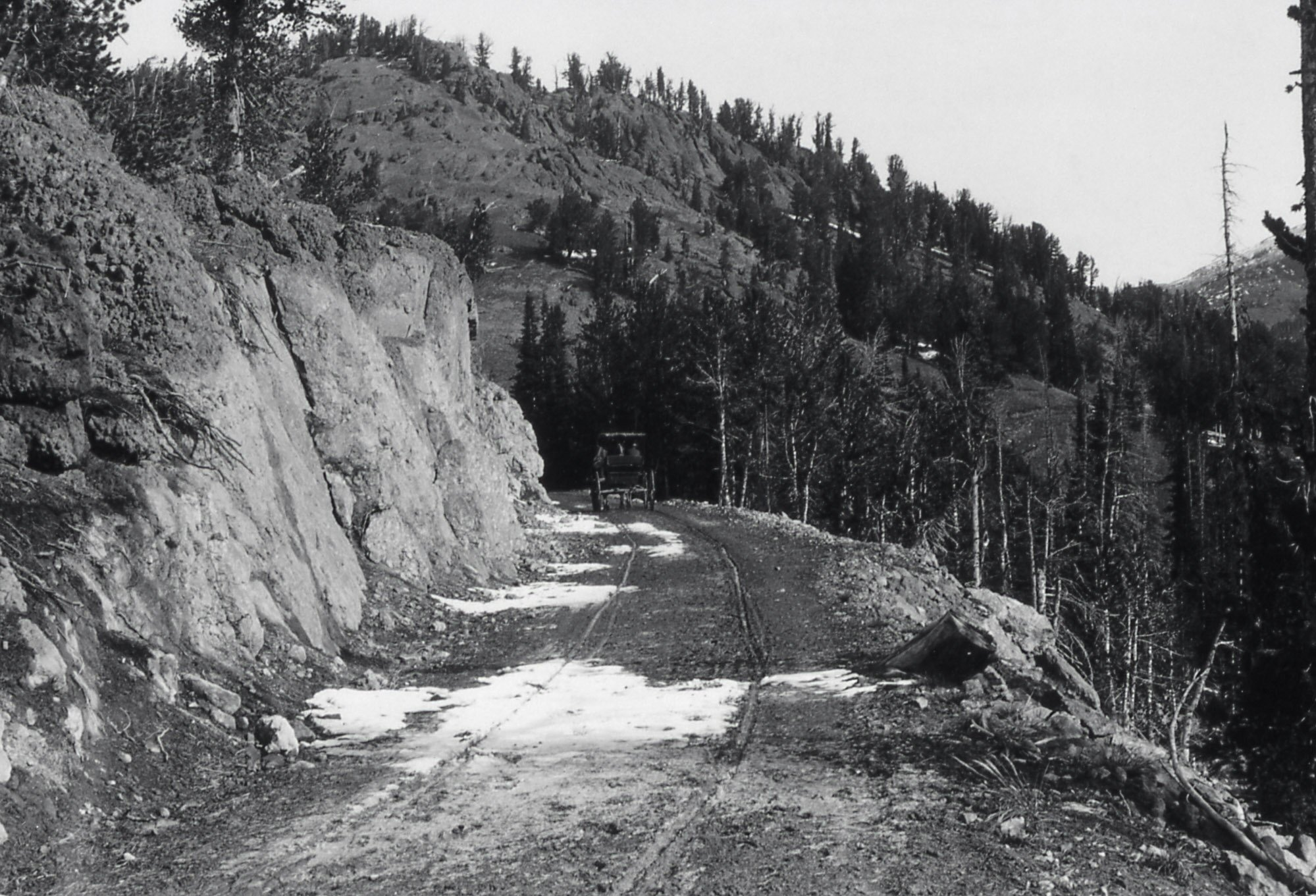
- Dunraven Pass, circa 1918
- Interactive map of Dunraven Pass
- Elevation: 8,859 ft (2,700 m)
- Traversed by: Grand Loop Road

Third Approach
- Location: Yellowstone National Park, Park County, Wyoming, United States
- Range: Washburn Range
- Coordinates: 44°47′12″N 110°27′09″W NAVD 88

Dunraven Pass (el. 8,859 feet (2,700 m)) is a mountain pass on the Grand Loop Road between Tower and Canyon in Yellowstone National Park, Wyoming.

== History ==
In 1874, just two years after the park's creation, The 4th Earl of Dunraven and Mount-Earl, an Anglo-Irish peer, made a visit to Yellowstone in conjunction with a hunting expedition to the Northern Rockies led by Texas Jack Omohundro. Lord Dunraven was so impressed with the park, that he devoted well over 150 pages to Yellowstone in his The Great Divide, published in London by Chatto & Windus in 1876. The Great Divide was one of the earliest works to praise and publicize the park.

In 1878 during a U.S. Geological Survey of the park, Henry Gannett, a geographer working with the survey, named a peak just two miles southwest of Mount Washburn in the honor of the Earl of Dunraven and the service his book had done for the park. In 1879, Philetus Norris, the park Superintendent, gave the pass on the Grand Loop Road between Tower and Canyon the name Dunraven because of its proximity to Dunraven Peak.
