= White Sulphur Springs (Jena, Louisiana) =

Historic house in Louisiana, United States

- U.S. National Register of Historic Places
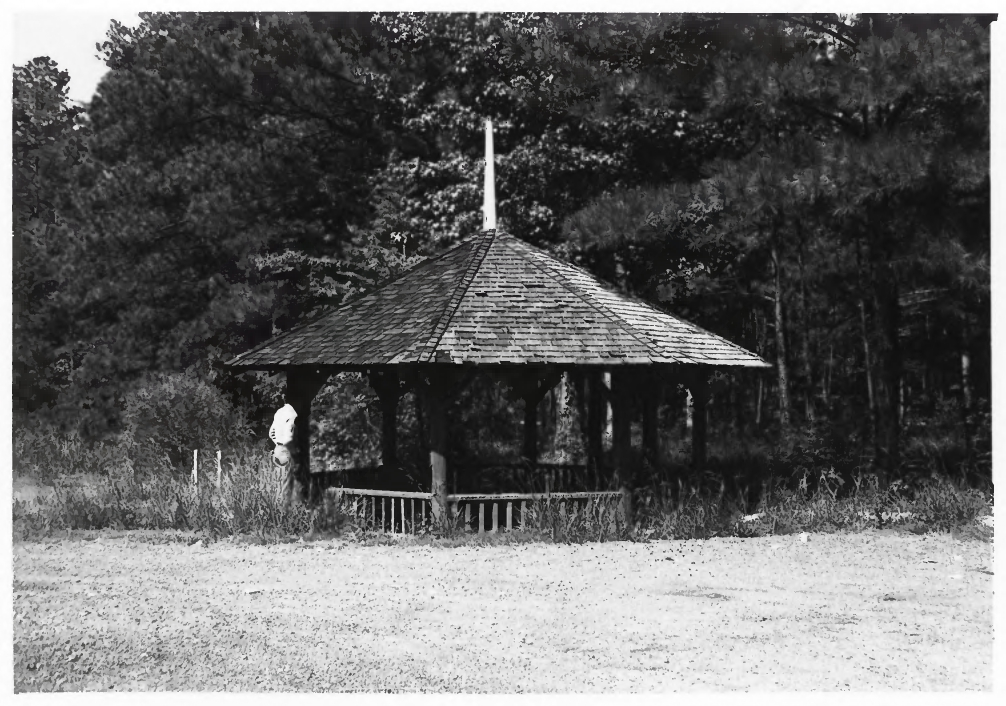

- Location within Louisiana Location within the United States
- Location: Along LA 8, about 10.2 miles (16.4 km) southwest of Jena
- Nearest city: Jena, Louisiana
- Coordinates: 31°36′03″N 92°16′35″W
- Area: 0.16 acres (0.065 ha)
- Built: c.1916
- Architect: W.G. Walker
- NRHP reference No.: 82000441
- Added to NRHP: December 17, 1982

White Sulphur Springs, also known as White Sulphur Springs Historic Site, is a historic site located along LA 8, about 10.2 miles (16.4 km) southwest of Jena.

The site is a small clearing including a spring encased in a gazebo built c. 1916 by W.G. Walker. Due to its supposed curative powers, the spring was once surrounded by a health resort with numerous buildings. The gazebo is the only remaining structure, and was restored c.1975. The spring was originally discovered by Joseph P. Ward in 1883.

The site was listed on the National Register of Historic Places on December 17, 1982.

== See also ==
- Abita Springs Pavilion: structure over a spring in St. Tammany Parish
- National Register of Historic Places listings in La Salle Parish, Louisiana
