= Sulphur Springs, Montgomery County, Arkansas =

Unincorporated community in Montgomery County, Arkansas, United States

Sulphur Springs, Arkansas
- Unincorporated community
- Location within Arkansas Location within the United States
- Coordinates: 34°29′45″N 93°53′01″W
- Country: United States
- State: Arkansas
- County: Montgomery
- Elevation: 961 ft (293 m)
- Time zone: UTC-6 (Central (CST))
  - Summer (DST): UTC-5 (CDT)
- Area code: 870
- GNIS feature ID: 78948

Sulphur Springs is an unincorporated community in Montgomery County, Arkansas, United States. Sulphur Springs is 10 miles (16 km) west-northwest of Black Springs.
