= Sulphur Spring =

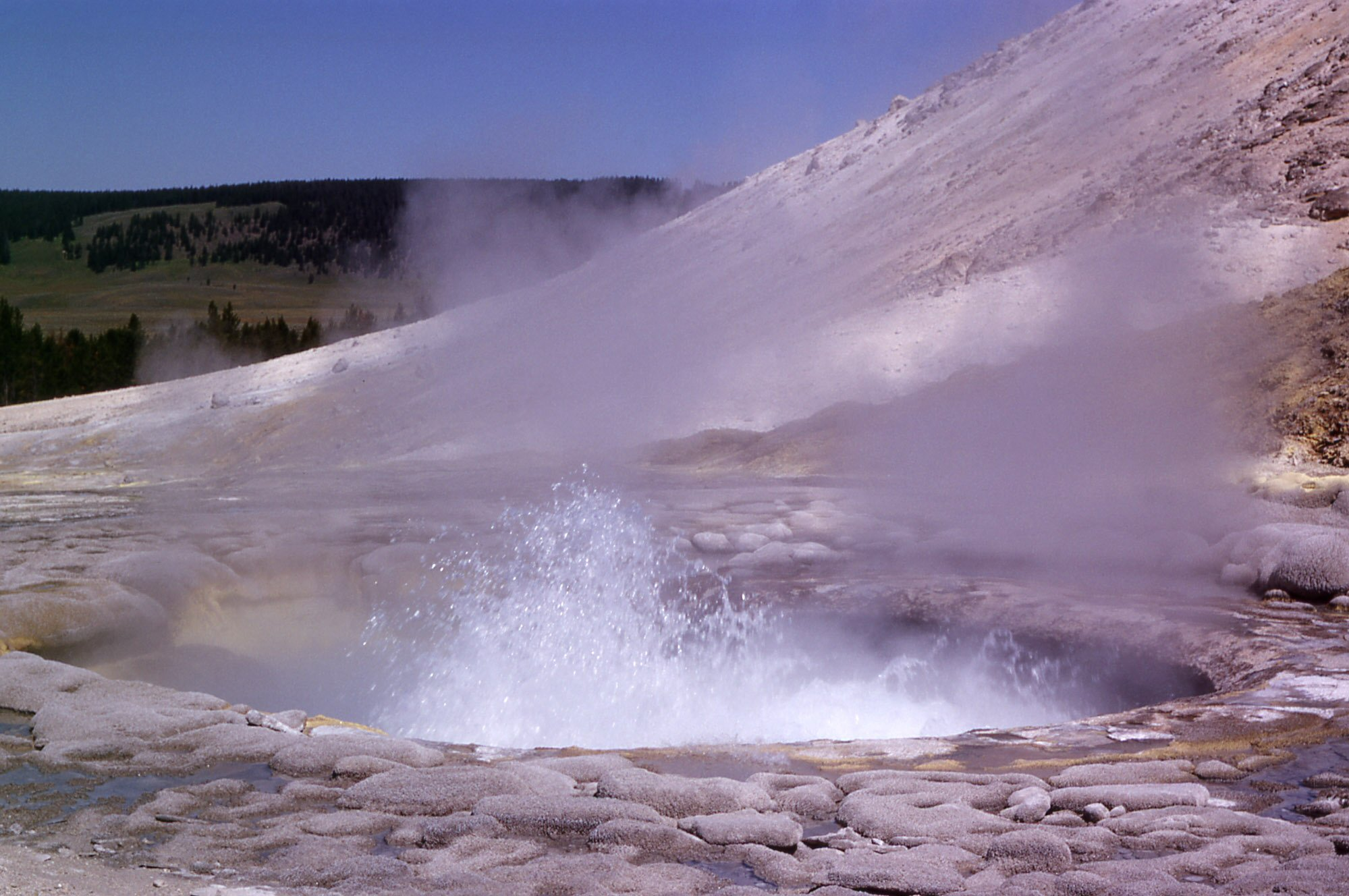
- Sulphur Spring (Crater Hills Geyser)
- Interactive map of Sulphur Spring
- Location: Hayden Valley, Yellowstone National Park, Park County, Wyoming
- Coordinates: 44°39′17″N 110°28′54″W
- Elevation: 7,835 feet (2,388 m)
- Type: Geyser
- Temperature: 175 °F (79 °C)

Sulphur Spring (also known as Crater Hills Geyser), is a geyser in the Hayden Valley region of Yellowstone National Park in the United States. Sulphur spring has a vent Temperature of 89 °C (192 °F) although the actual temperature of the spring is 79.8 °C (175.6 °F). It is located in the Crater Hills area of Hayden Valley about 1 mile (1.6 km) west of the Grand Loop Road.

== See also ==
- List of Yellowstone geothermal features
