= Yount =

Yount is an English surname. Notable people with the surname include:

- Barton Kyle Yount (1884–1949), American general
- Christian Yount (born 1988), American football long snapper
- Ducky Yount (1885–1970), American Major League Baseball pitcher in 1914
- Eddie Yount (1915–1973), American Major League Baseball outfielder in 1937 and 1939
- George C. Yount (1794–1865), American trapper and explorer, first American resident of California's Napa Valley
- Hampton Yount (born 1984), American stand-up comedian
- Harry Yount (1837–1924), American mountain man; first de facto park ranger of Yellowstone National Park

- Younts Peak, a peak in Wyoming named after Harry Yount

- John P. Yount (1850–1872), American soldier and Medal of Honor recipient
- Larry Yount (born 1950), American Major League Baseball pitcher in 1971, brother of Robin Yount
- Miles Franklin Yount (1880–1933), American oil baron
- Robin Yount (born 1955), American Major League Baseball player for the Milwaukee Brewers from 1974 to 1993, Hall of Famer, and brother of Larry Yount
