= Emerald Pool =

Emerald Pool may refer to:

- Emerald Pool (Yosemite National Park), US
- Emerald Pool (Yuba River), US
- Emerald Pool (Yellowstone National Park), US
- Emerald Pool, Morne Trois Pitons National Park, Dominica
- Emerald Pool, Zion National Park, Utah, US
