= John Yount =

John Yount may refer to:

- John P. Yount, U.S. Army soldier and Medal of Honor recipient
- John Yount (writer), American novelist and academic
