= Emerald Spring =

Hot spring in Yellowstone National Park, US

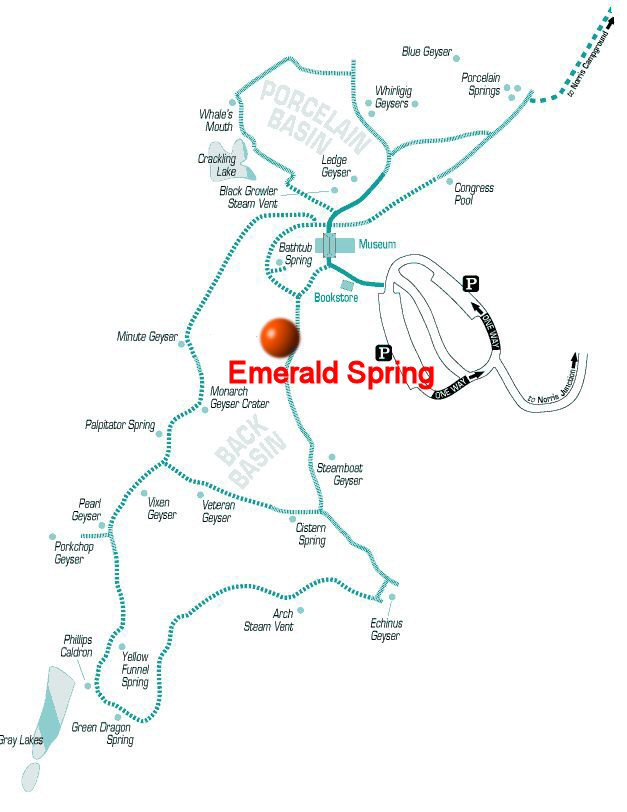
- Norris Geyser Basin
- Name origin: Philetus Norris, park superintendent (1877-82)
- Location: Norris Geyser Basin, Yellowstone National Park, Park County, Wyoming
- Coordinates: 44.725665°N 110.704276°W
- Elevation: 8,448 feet (2,575 m)
- Type: Hot Spring
- Temperature: 83.3 °C (181.9 °F)
- Depth: 27 feet (8.2 m)

Emerald Spring is a hot spring located in Norris Geyser Basin of Yellowstone National Park.

== History ==
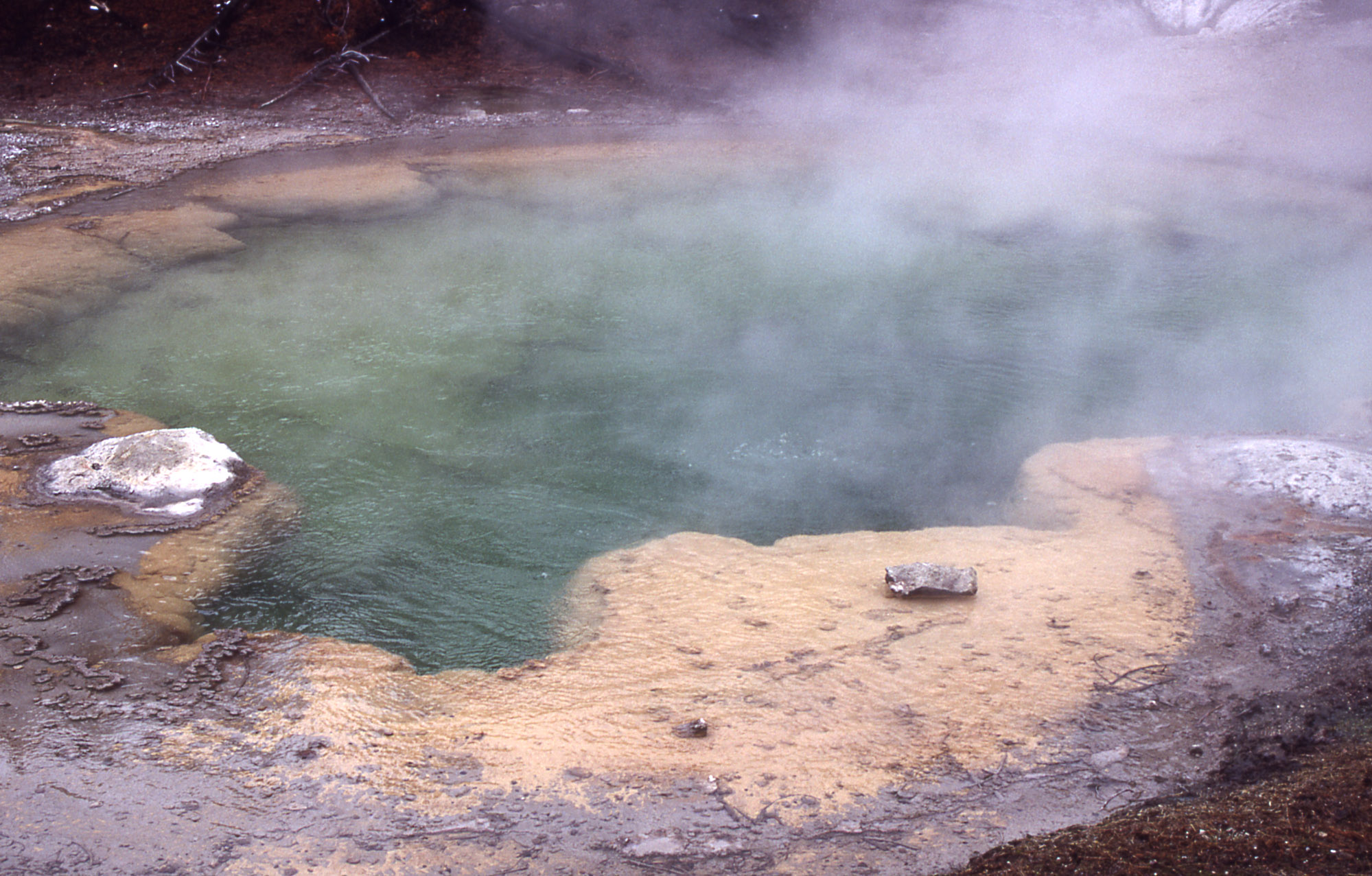
Emerald Spring, 1989

Originally named Emerald Geyser by Philetus Norris, park superintendent (1877–1882) because of its color, the name was later officially changed to Emerald Spring by the U.S. Geological Survey in 1930.

In 1892 Robert W. Wood, an American optical physicist, used the spring for a prank. He stealthy dissolved a pint of fluorescein in the pool to surprise several witnesses with unusually colorful water.

== Characteristics ==
Emerald Spring is 27 feet (8.2 m) deep. The water temperature in the spring is around 83.3 °C (181.9 °F). The spring gets its name from the emerald green color of the water created by sunlight filtering through the water, giving the light a blue color, and reflecting off the yellow sulphur creating the green hue.

While Emerald Spring is a mostly calm pool, which usually only has a few bubbles rising to the surface, it does experience periods of turbidity and small 3-foot (1-m) high eruptions. In 1931, Emerald experienced a period of extremely vigorous activity with eruptions measuring 60 to 75 feet (18.2–22.9 m) in height.
