= Emerald Pool (Yellowstone National Park) =

Hot spring in Yellowstone National Park

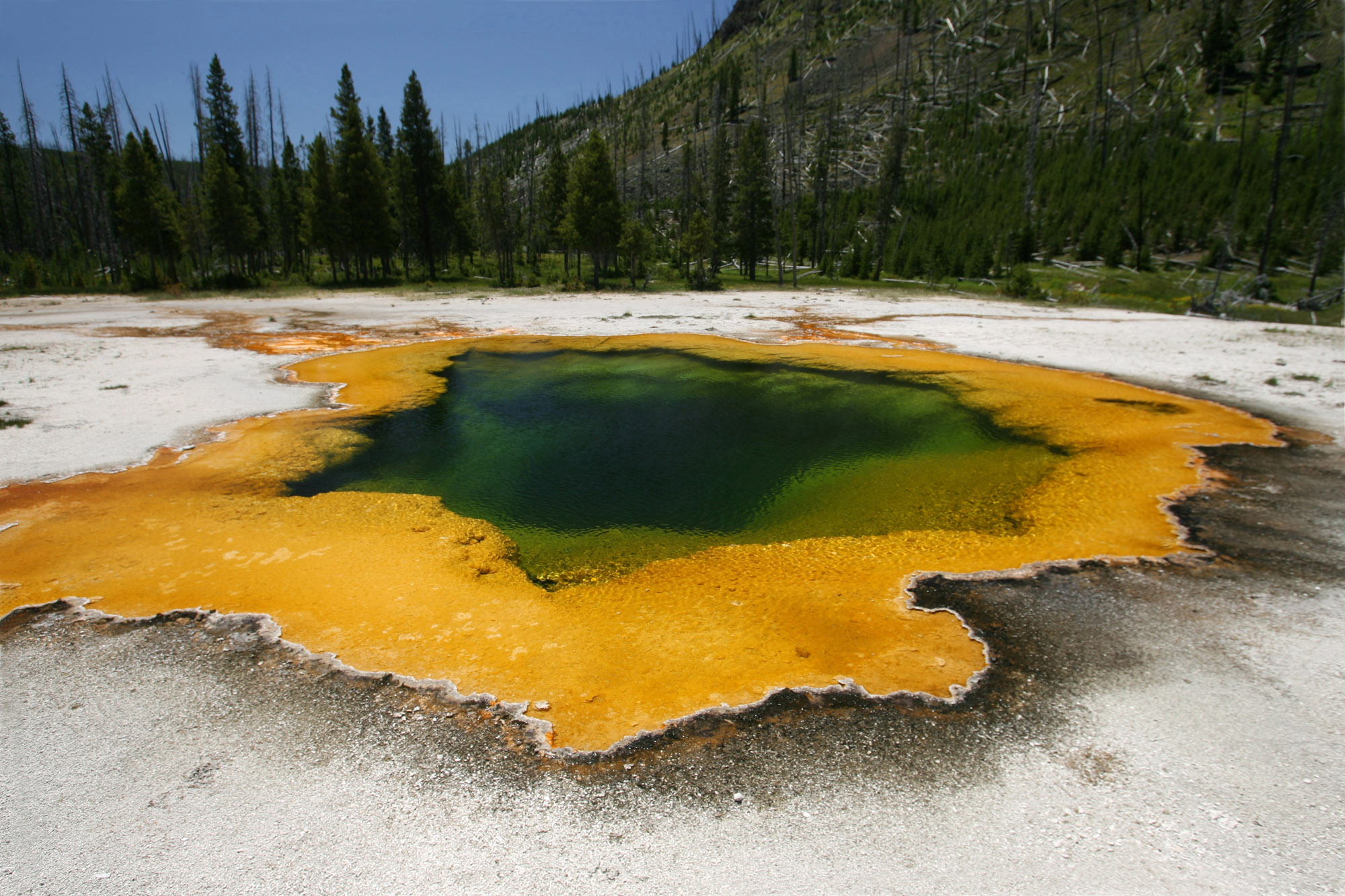
Emerald Pool in Black Sand Basin, 2007

Emerald Pool, a hot spring named for its emerald green color, is one of the main attractions at Black Sand Basin Hot Springs in Yellowstone National Park. Its temperature is 154.6 °F (68.1 °C) and its dimensions are 27 by 38 feet (8.2 by 11.6 m) with a depth of 25 feet (7.6 m). The color is due to growth of yellow bacteria and algae. Cooling, the result of objects thrown into the pool and natural debris, has affected the growth of the bacteria and algae, making the pool appear orange and brown around the edges.

== See also ==
- Emerald Spring
