= Mount Norris =

Mountain in Wyoming, United States

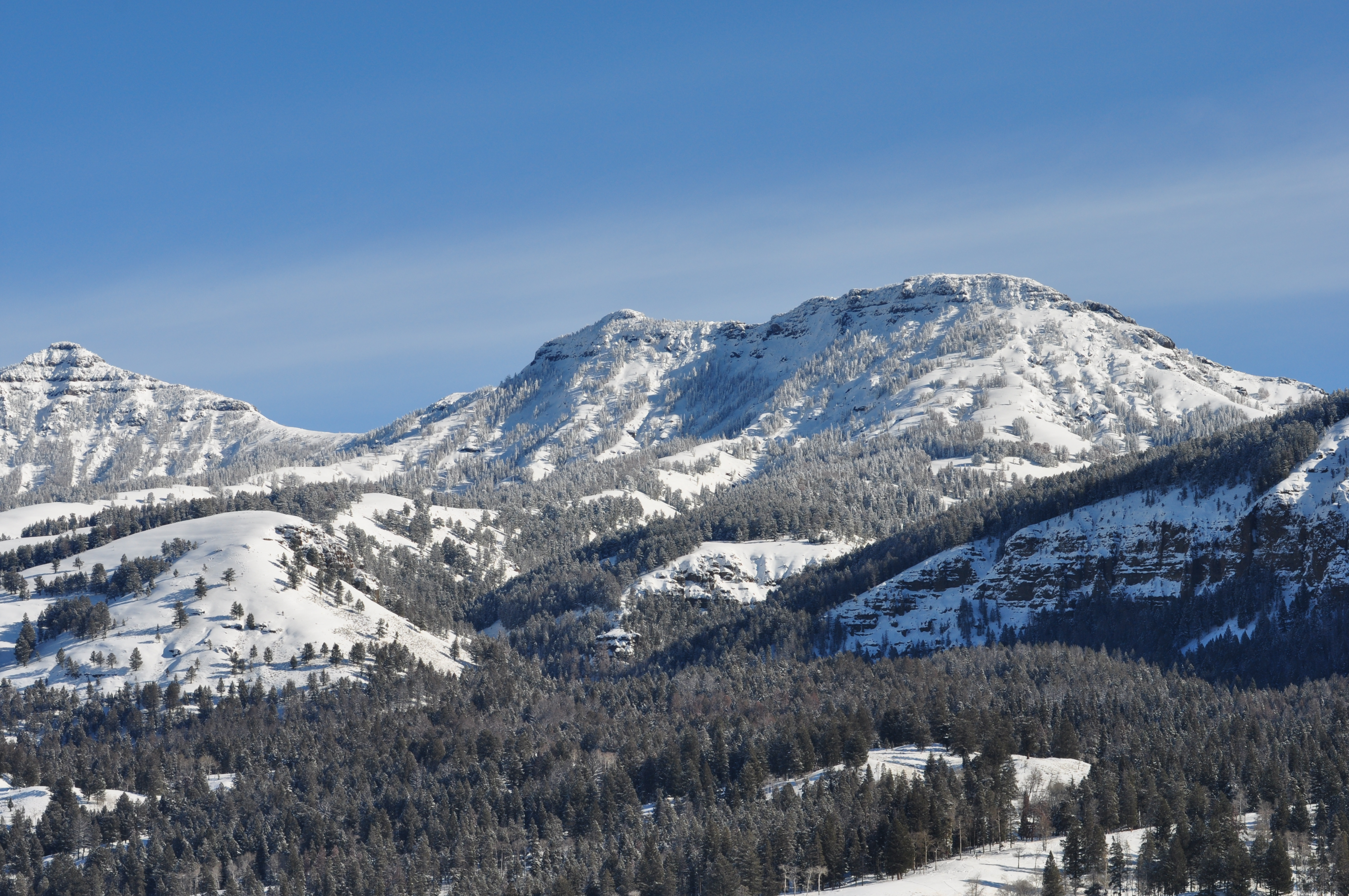
- January 2010

Highest point
- Elevation: 9,842 ft (3,000 m)
- Coordinates: 44°52′28″N 110°05′41″W

Geography
- Location within Wyoming
- Location: Yellowstone National Park, Park County, Wyoming
- Topo map: Wahb Springs

Mount Norris, elevation 9,842 feet (3,000 m), is a mountain peak in the northeast section of Yellowstone National Park in the Absaroka Range of the U.S. state of Wyoming. In 1875, the peak was named for and by Philetus Norris, the park's second superintendent from 1877 to 1882. While on a visit to the park, Norris and several mountain guides, including Collins Jack "Yellowstone Jack" Baronette, ascended the peak at the head of the Lamar Valley and presumed they were the first white men to do so, thus naming it Mount Norris.

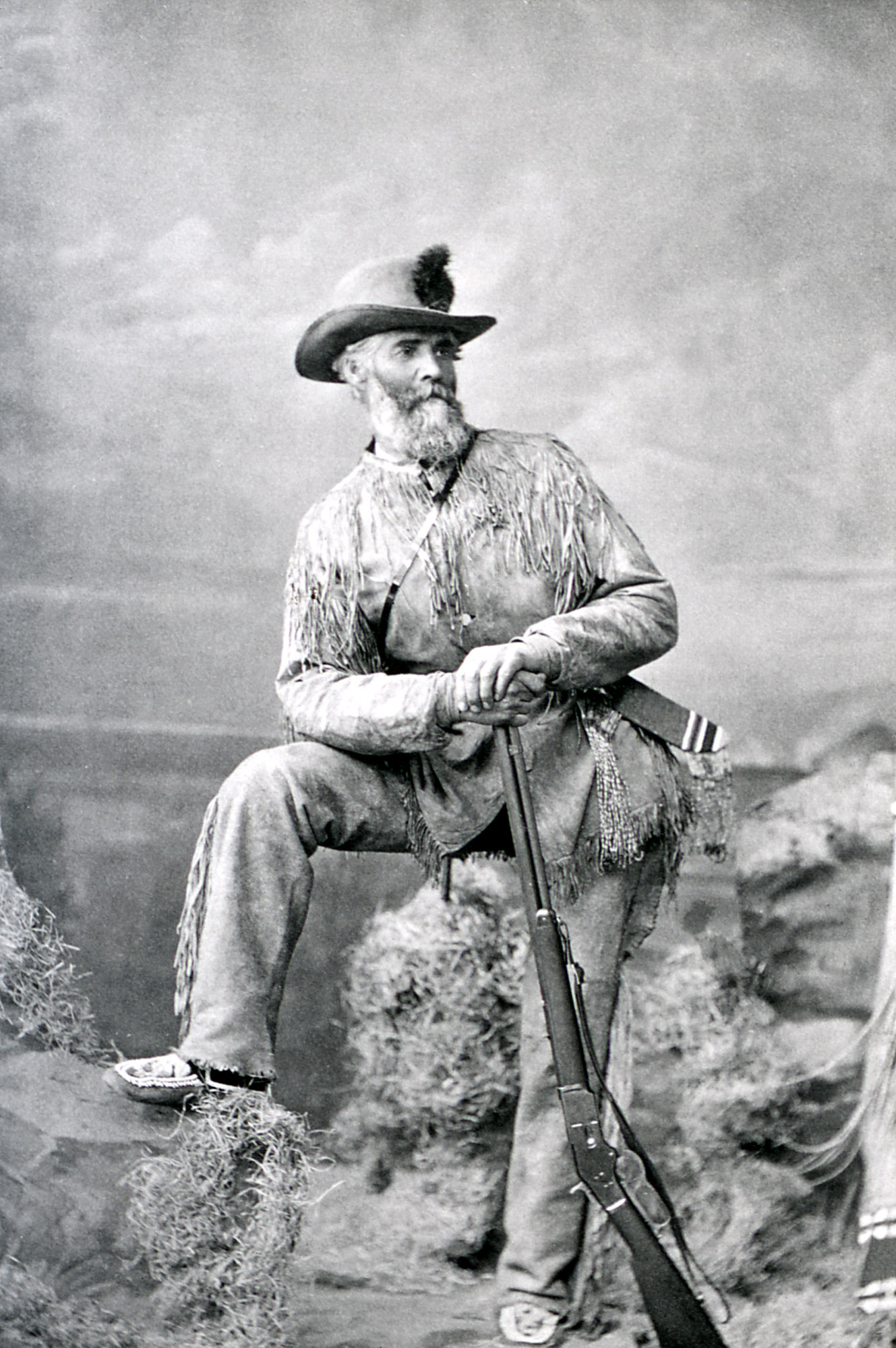
Mount Norris' namesake, Philetus Norris

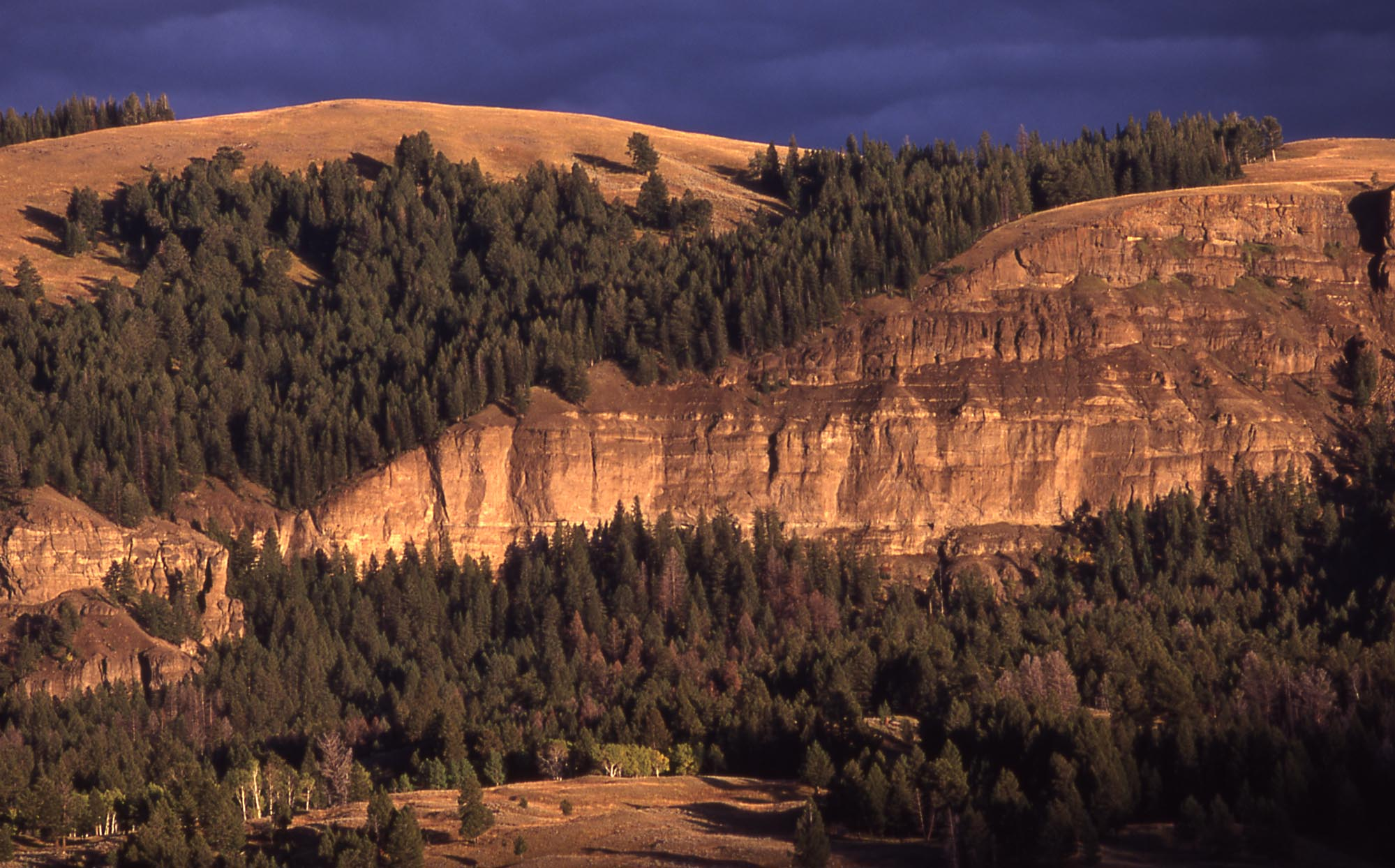
South Ridge

== See also ==
- Mountains and mountain ranges of Yellowstone National Park
