= Philetus W. Norris House =

Historic house in Michigan, United States

- U.S. National Register of Historic Places
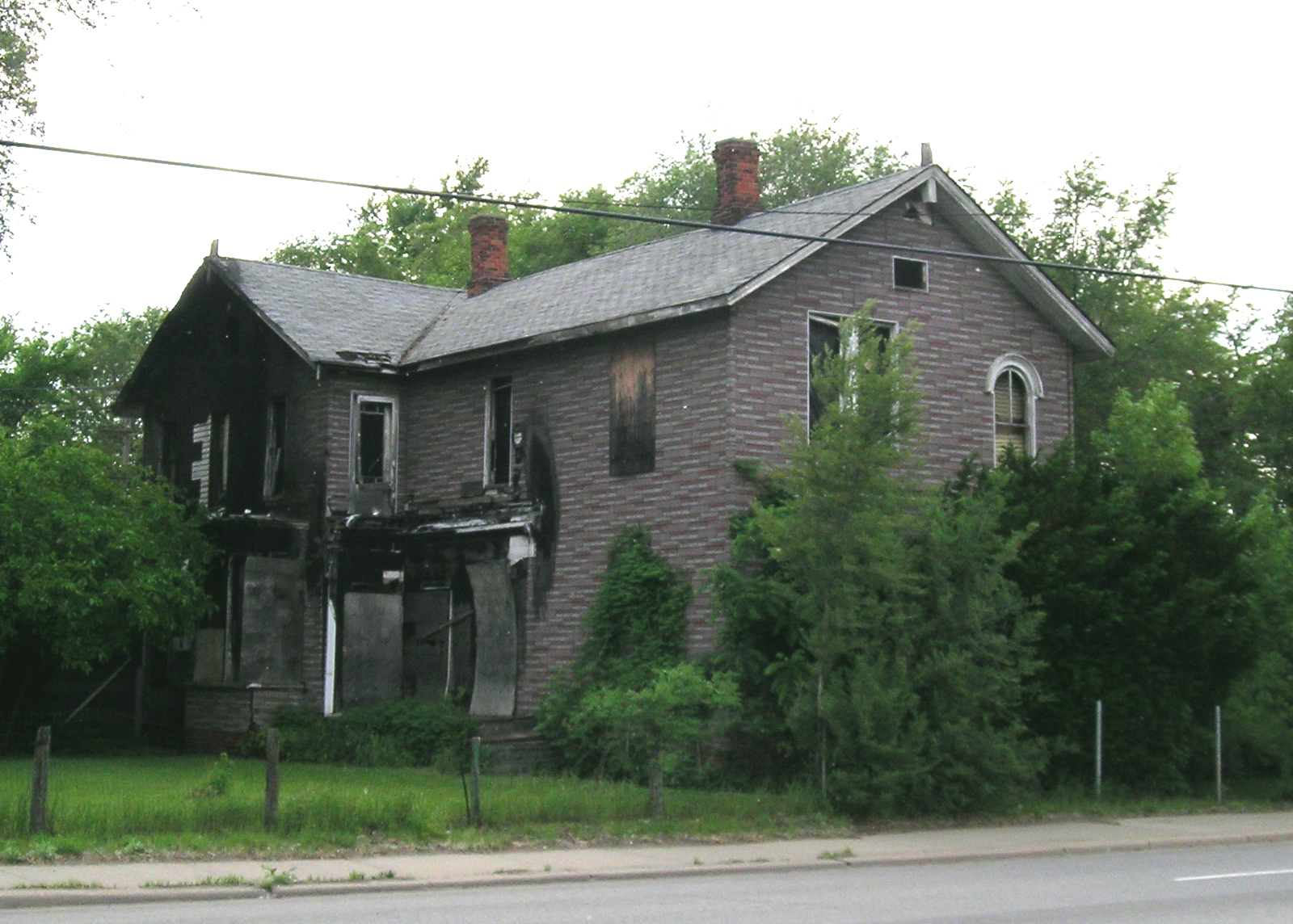
- The side yard of the Philetus W. Norris House. The additional wing is hidden behind the tree to the left.
- Interactive map
- Location: 17815 Mt. Elliott Avenue, Detroit, Michigan
- Coordinates: 42°25′30″N 83°2′19″W
- Built: 1873
- Architectural style: Late Victorian
- NRHP reference No.: 91001982
- Added to NRHP: January 28, 1992

The Philetus W. Norris House is located in Detroit, Michigan, near the corner of Mound Road and Davison Avenue. It was built in 1873 by Philetus W. Norris, who went on to become the second superintendent of Yellowstone National Park. The house was listed on the National Register of Historic Places in 1992 but was substantially destroyed by fire in 2016.

== Philetus W. Norris ==
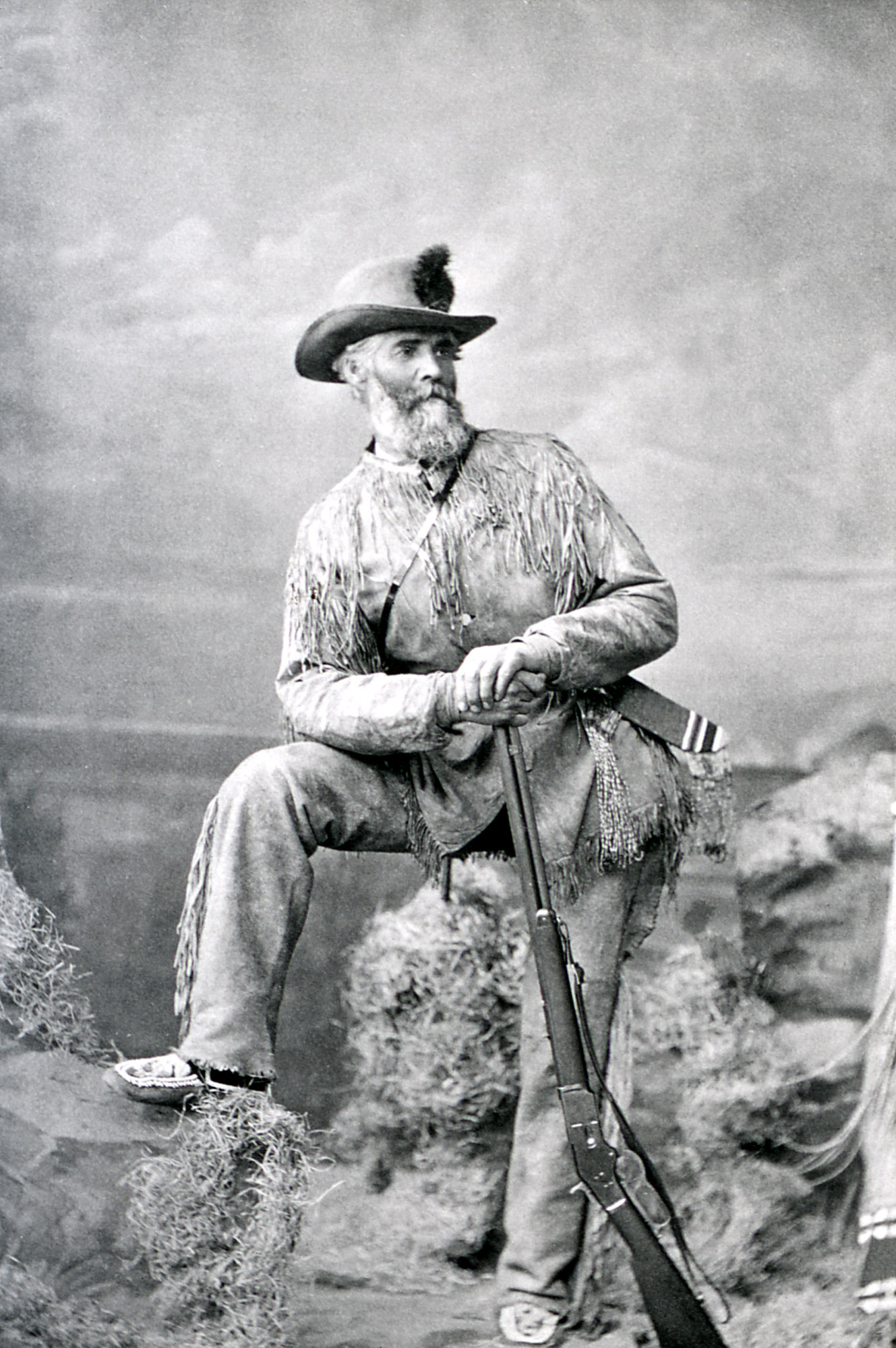
Philetus W. Norris, before 1885

Philetus W. Norris was born in Palmyra, New York in 1821, the son of John Norris, Jr. and Azubah Phelps. In 1826, they bought 80 acres (320,000 m^{2}) in Michigan, moving there soon thereafter.

Norris left school early and traveled all around the midwest to trap and trade. He In 1838, Norris settled in northwest Ohio, and in 1845 he married Jane K. Cottrell. They had four children: Edward, Aurelia, Ida and Arthur. Norris fought in the Civil War began, served as a spy, and eventually rose to the rank of Colonel.

After the Civil War, Norris moved to Michigan, where he founded the town of Norris in 1873 and ran a successful real estate and newspaper business. In 1877, Norris became the second superintendent of Yellowstone National Park, a position he held until 1882. Norris died in 1885, and is buried in Woodmere Cemetery.

== Village of Norris ==
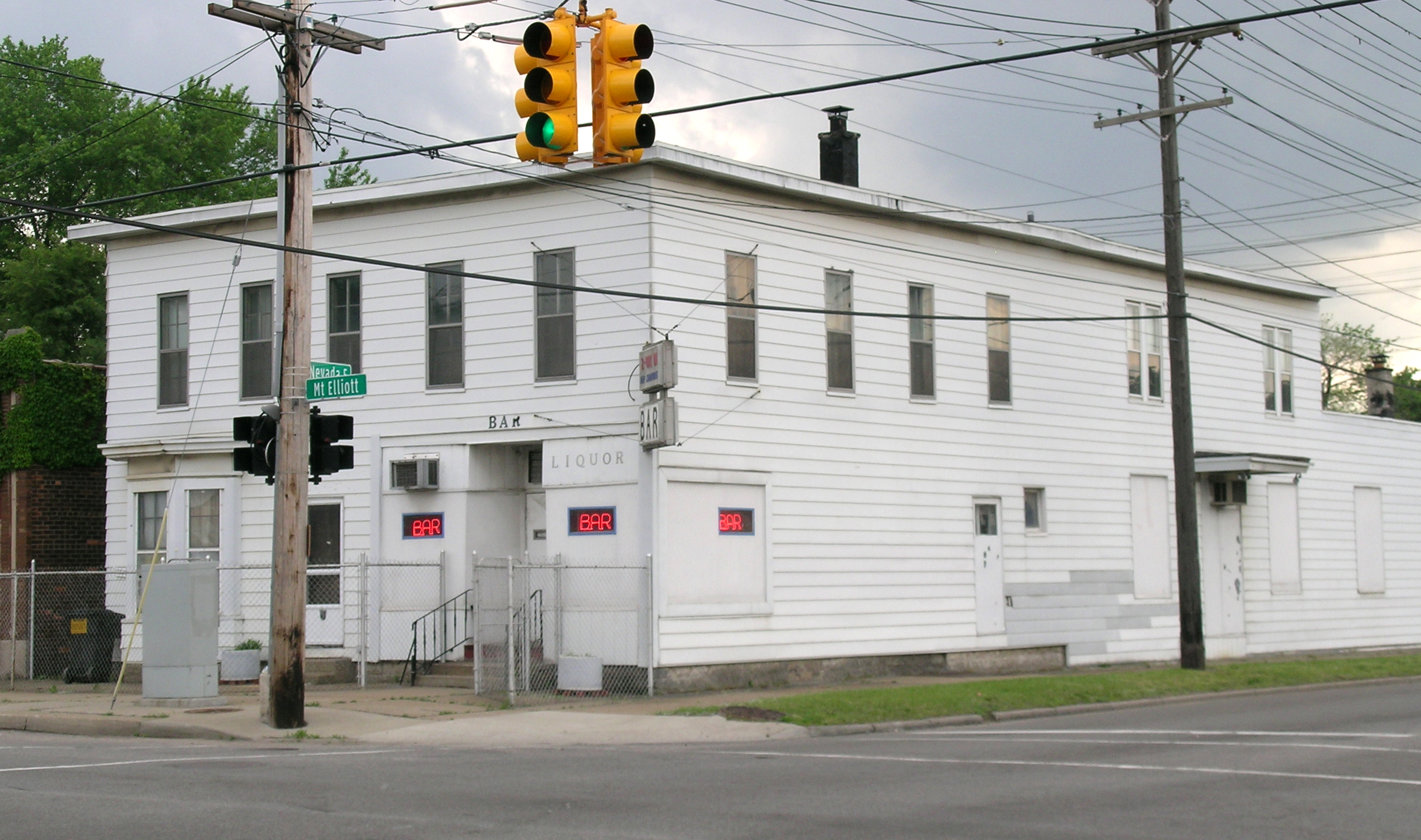
The Two Way Inn, Philetus Norris's first residence in Norris.

When Norris moved to Michigan, he managed land which belonged to officers and soldiers of both the Union and Confederate armies as part of a federal contract. In 1873, he platted the village of Norris in Wayne County at the location where his house now still stands. Norris had originally wanted to name the town "Prairie Mound," but the Detroit and Bay City Railroad (who Norris had convinced to run through the area) posted "Norris" on the depot, and the name stuck.

The original village boundaries were roughly Seven Mile Road on the north, Mound Road on the west, Six Mile Road on the south, and Van Dyke Road on the east. To ensure the success of his community, Norris drained the creek that ran through the area to open up land for farming and maintained the plank road that ran between Detroit and Mount Clemens, operating a tollbooth located in the village. Norris also built the Two Way Inn, which was originally the village's jail and general store; Norris lived there until he built his nearby house. The Two Way Inn still stands as of 2019; other than a nearby church and the Philetus W. Norris House itself, it is the only building remaining from the original village of Norris.

The village was settled primarily by German Lutherans, farmers who sold their produce to Detroit residents. By 1880, the population of Norris had grown to approximately 250 people . The village boasted, in addition to the railroad depot, a hotel, wagon shop, sawmill, multiple homes, and more. In 1891, the village of Norris was renamed "North Detroit." The city boundaries of Detroit gradually crept nearer, and in 1924 Detroit annexed the village. The only modern-day indication that the area was once a separate village is the "Nortown" moniker on some local businesses, evoking the old names of "Norris" and "North Detroit."

== Philetus W. Norris House ==
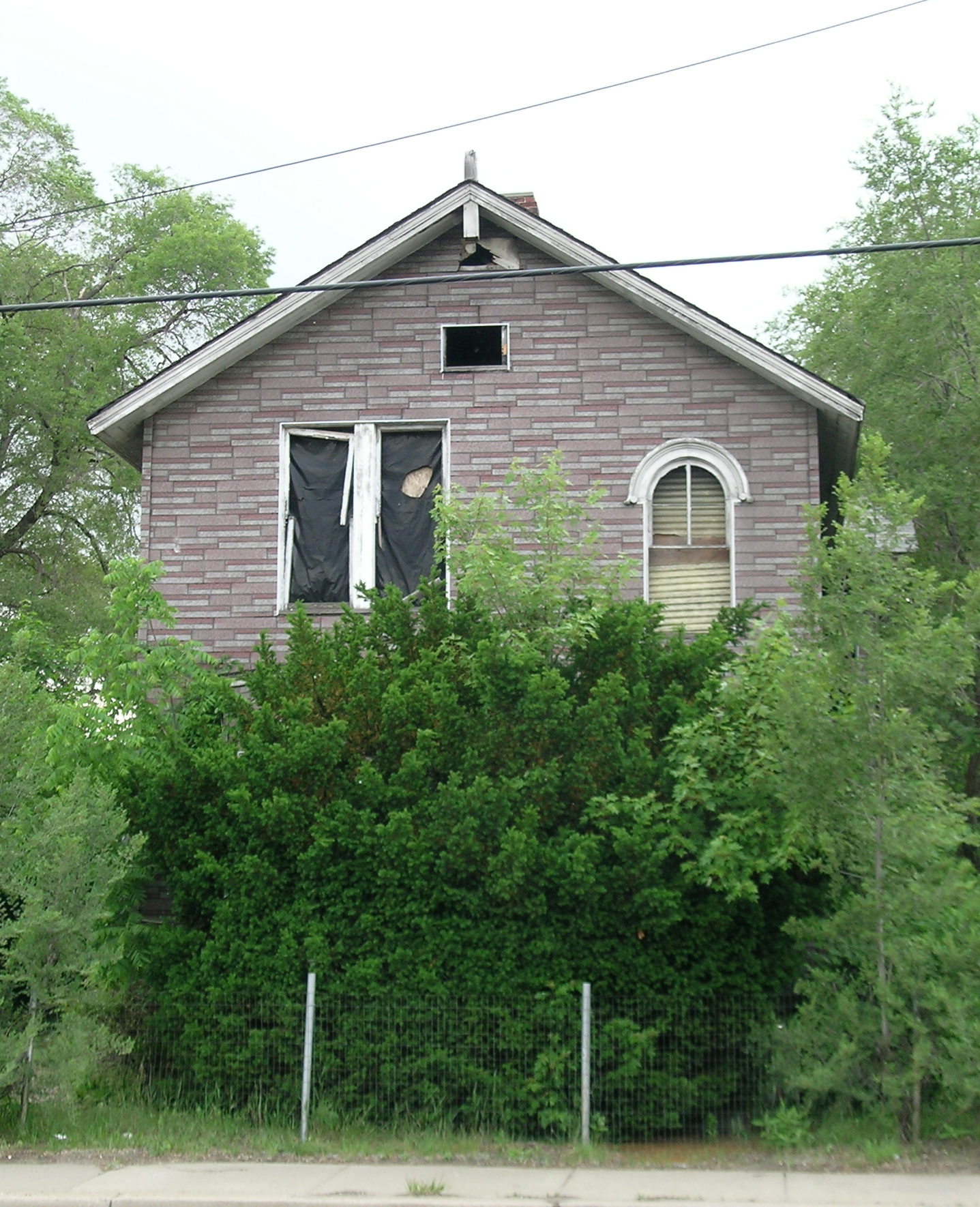
Front facade of the Philetus Norris house from across Mount Elliot. The first floor is hidden by vegetation.

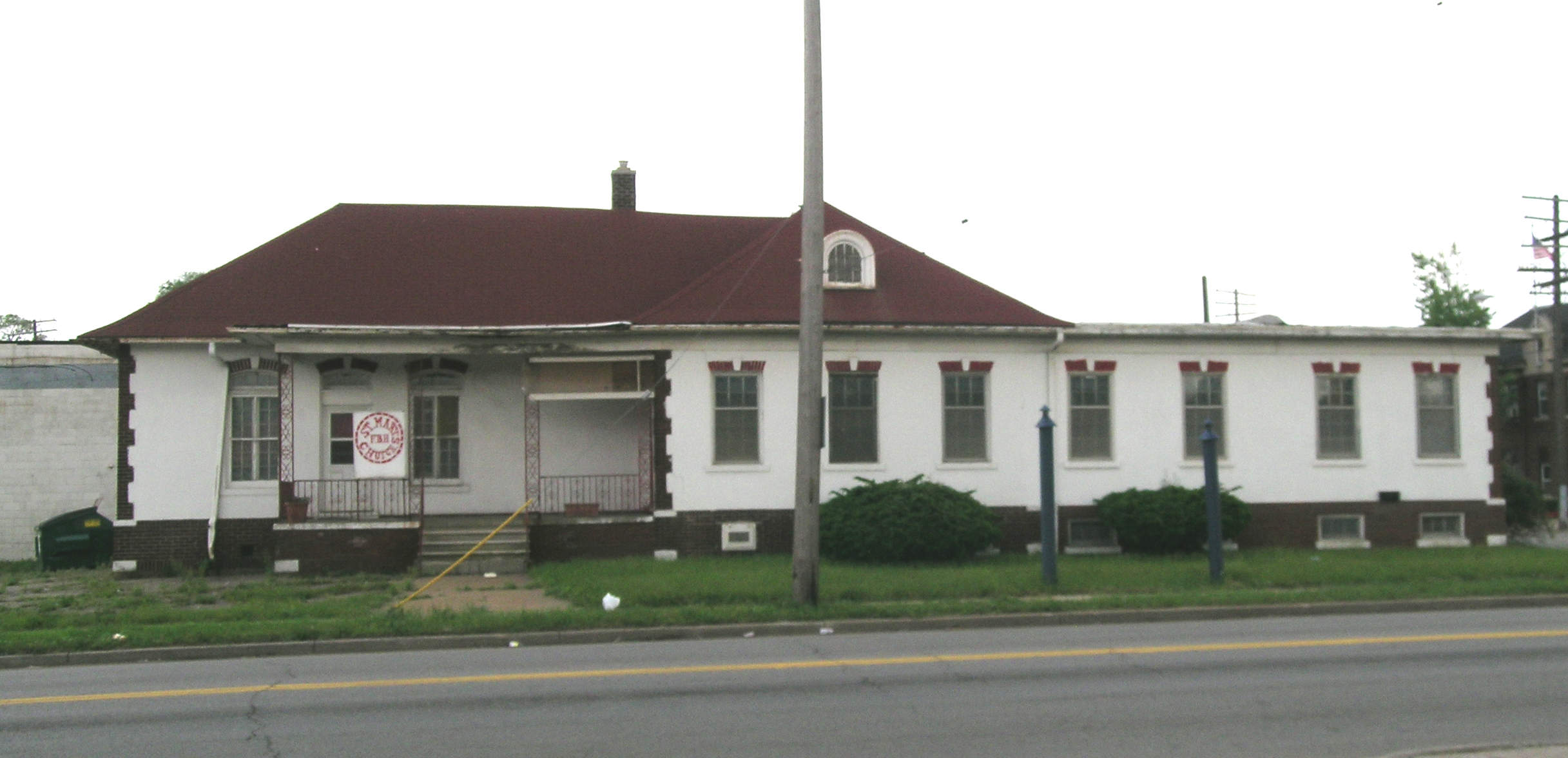
St. Mary's F.B.H Church, the only other original building left from the village of Norris.

The Philetus W. Norris House was built in 1873; it is a two-story late Victorian vernacular structure. At the time it was built, the home had gingerbread trim, brick chimneys and leafy trees in its yard. Norris moved from the Two Way Inn into this house, and also constructed a wing along one side from which he ran his real estate business.

Norris moved to Yellowstone in 1877, but the Norris family owned the house until 1916, when they sold it to William Lynch. Lynch used it in part to operate a boarding house, and sold the home in 1925, when it was converted to a three-family unit. The house was owned and occupied by a series of residents, and in 1965 was converted back to a single-family residence; this may have been the time when the exterior was covered with the asphalt siding still on the house today. The home was occupied until 1991, when the last owner moved out and the property was listed as abandoned and tax delinquent.

The house was placed on the National Register of Historic Places in 1992, and was designated a city of Detroit historic district in 1995. The Nortown Community Development Corporation purchased the house with plans to restore it, but in 1999 an arsonist badly damaged the property. As of 2008, the home is abandoned, although plans are still in the works to complete restoration.

On July 3, 2016, the Philetus Norris House was substantially destroyed by fire, leaving only a portion standing.
