= Harry Yount =

First game warden in Yellowstone National Park (1839–1924)

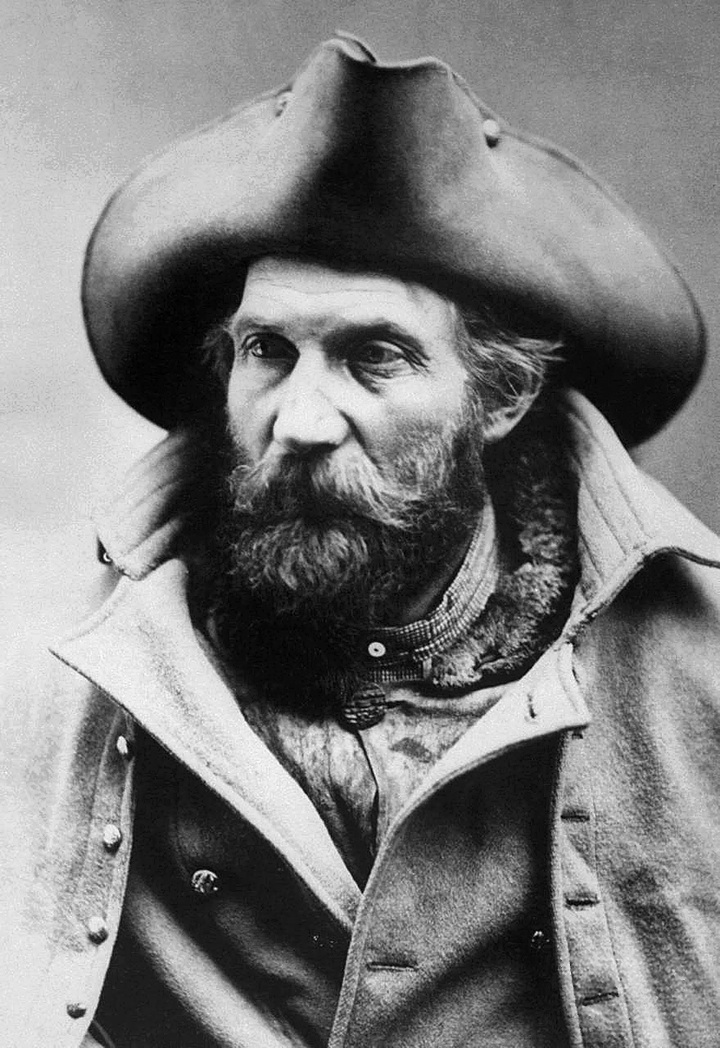
- Yount in 1873
- Born: March 18, 1839 (likely); Washington County, Missouri, US (likely)
- Died: May 16, 1924 (aged 85); Wheatland, Wyoming, US
- Burial place: Lakeview Cemetery, Cheyenne, Wyoming
- Relatives: George C. Yount (uncle)
- Military career
- Allegiance: United States
- Branch: Union Army
- Service years: 1861–65
- Rank: Company quartermaster sergeant
- Nickname: Rocky Mountain Harry Yount
- Units: 8th Regiment Missouri Volunteer Cavalry
- Conflicts: American Civil War: Battle of Pea Ridge
- Other work: Prospector; Hunter; Geological survey guide; Gamekeeper of Yellowstone National Park

Harry S. Yount (March 18, 1839 – May 16, 1924) was an American Union Army soldier, mountain man, hunter, prospector, wrangler and wilderness guide. A seasonal employee of the United States Department of the Interior, he was the first game warden in Yellowstone National Park. He was nicknamed "Rocky Mountain Harry Yount".

Yount served two terms in the Union Army during the American Civil War. He first enlisted for a six-month term in November 1861. He was wounded and taken prisoner by the Confederate States Army in an opening skirmish of the Battle of Pea Ridge in Arkansas in March 1862, and held as a prisoner of war for nearly a month until released in a prisoner exchange. He re-enlisted in August 1862 and served until the end of the war. He was promoted three times and was a company quartermaster sergeant when he was discharged in July 1865.

He worked as a hunter and a prospector, and as a bullwhacker for the U.S. Army, in the years following the Civil War. For seven years in the 1870s he worked as a guide, hunter and wrangler for the expeditions of the Hayden Geological Surveys, which mapped vast areas of the Rocky Mountains.

In 1880, Yount was hired by the United States Secretary of the Interior, Carl Schurz, to be the first gamekeeper in Yellowstone National Park, and during his 14 months in that job wrote two annual reports for Schurz, which were then submitted to Congress. His reports described the challenges of protecting the wildlife in the first U.S. national park and influenced the culture of the National Park Service, which was founded 35 years later in 1916. Horace Albright, the second director of the National Park Service, called Yount the "father of the ranger service, as well as the first national park ranger". Yount was a prospector during much of the last four decades of his life.

== Family background and early years ==
Harry Yount's paternal ancestors, Hans George Jundt and Anna Marie Jundt, arrived in Philadelphia in 1731, immigrants from Alsace-Lorraine. Their son, Johannes or John Yount, later moved to Lincoln County, North Carolina. Their grandson, Harry's paternal grandfather, Jacob A Yount, moved to present day Missouri with several other families shortly after the Louisiana Purchase. Harry's parents were David Yount (1795–1881) and Catherine Shell Yount. Harry Yount's father, David Yount, was about 44 years old at the time of Harry's birth, and Harry was the couple's tenth child.

Harry Yount's uncle, George C. Yount, was a trapper and explorer who moved on from Missouri to Santa Fe and then to California before Harry's birth. In the 1830s, George C. Yount became the first citizen of the United States to settle in Napa Valley in California, which was then Mexican territory. The town of Yountville, California, is named after him. Two of Harry's older brothers, Caleb and John Yount, also moved to the Napa Valley years later.

There are conflicting accounts of Harry Yount's place and date of birth. Ernest Ingersoll wrote that he was born in Susquehanna County, Pennsylvania, and different birth years have been mentioned by various writers, such as the anonymous author of a published biographical sketch who wrote that Yount was born in 1847, and Thomas J. Bryant, who interviewed Yount in the latter years of his life and who speculated that 1837 was his birth date in an article published in the Annals of Wyoming, journal of the Wyoming State Historical Society. However, research undertaken by William R. Supernaugh, an employee of the National Park Service, found military enlistment papers, Yount's Army pension file, and the 1840 United States census records, all of which indicate that Yount was born on March 18, 1839. These records also show that his legal name was Henry S. Yount. His lifelong nickname was "Harry", and his middle name is unknown.

Although Yount's place of birth is uncertain, Supernaugh concludes it is highly unlikely he was born in Pennsylvania, but rather in Harmony Township, Washington County, Missouri, because the 1840 census shows his father living there with a baby son. Henry was listed as 11 years old in the 1850 census. Harmony Township is a rural area about 75 miles (121 kilometres) southwest of St. Louis.

== Civil War military service ==
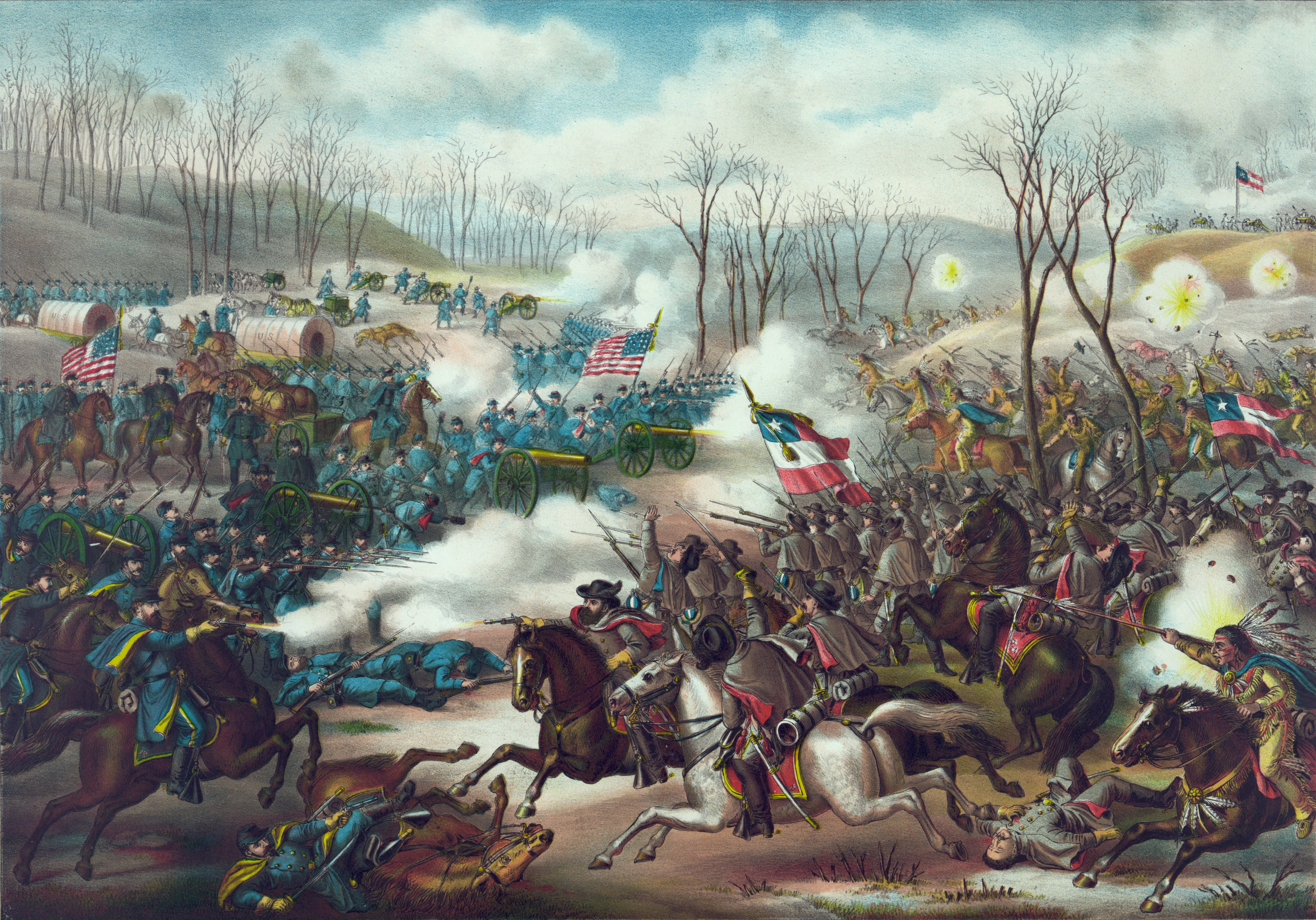
The 1862 Battle of Pea Ridge, where Yount was taken prisoner in a skirmish just before the battle began

Yount enlisted in the Union Army for a six-month term on November 9, 1861, and served in Company F of Phelps' Regiment of the Missouri Infantry. John S. Phelps was his commanding general. Yount was wounded in the leg in a skirmish just before the Battle of Pea Ridge began on March 6, 1862, and taken prisoner by the Confederates. As a captive, he was marched more than 90 miles (140 km) to Fort Smith in his bare feet on cold, wet roads, and was held there as a POW for 28 days before his release in a prisoner exchange. He was discharged from the Union Army in May 1862.

Yount re-enlisted in Lebanon, Missouri, on August 9, 1862, and served as a private in Company H of the 8th Regiment Missouri Volunteer Cavalry, a unit involved in 11 combat engagements during his service. On April 14, 1863, he was promoted to corporal and then to sergeant on December 9, 1863; he became company quartermaster sergeant on June 13, 1864. He was discharged in Little Rock, Arkansas, on July 20, 1865, after the war had ended.

As a result of his barefoot march to captivity, Yount developed rheumatism in both feet. When the Dependent and Disability Pension Act passed in 1890, he became eligible for a monthly partial disability pension of $6 in 1892, which was raised to $12 a month in 1900 and $25 in 1912. Yount was later an active member of the Grand Army of the Republic, the post-war organization of veterans of the Union Army.

== Bullwhacker, hunter and trapper ==
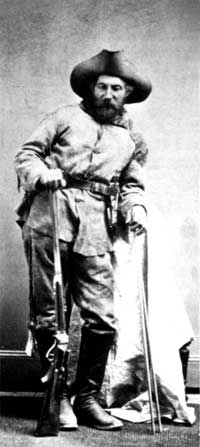
Yount c. 1873

After the Civil War ended, Yount became engaged to Estella Braun, a Western Union employee in Detroit, Michigan. She was killed in a train wreck before their wedding could take place, and he never married. Yount traveled to Fort Kearny, along the Oregon Trail in Nebraska. There he was hired as an Army bullwhacker, transporting supplies by wagon along the Bozeman Trail between Fort Laramie in modern-day Wyoming and Fort C. F. Smith in modern-day Montana. There was conflict with Native Americans in this region in those years, and Yount fought against Cheyenne and Sioux warriors several times while on the trail. In one incident, his ox wagon was harassed for four days by a party of Sioux warriors, until he fired his carbine at one warrior, hitting and probably killing the warrior's horse. Supernaugh comments that Yount believed that Indians would kill him if they could, but that he did not "blame the Indians for defending what was their country originally." Yount also worked as a buffalo hunter during this period. He sold buffalo tongues for $1 each to tourists in Cheyenne. Yount believed that "it was a pity to kill off the buffaloes, which were here in immense numbers, but it was the only way to get rid of the Indians, as the buffalo were their main source of subsistence."

The Smithsonian Institution engaged Yount's services to collect specimens of animals for taxidermy display in the early 1870s. Because he was successful in this first assignment, Spencer F. Baird of the Smithsonian again retained Yount's services in 1875 to collect specimens of many species of Rocky Mountain mammals. It is likely that many of these were displayed at the Centennial Exposition in Philadelphia in 1876, as extant photos of the exhibit halls show similar specimens. During those years, Yount also began his long career as prospector, achieving some success.

In 1877, Yount was the subject of a magazine profile written by Ernest Ingersoll and published in Appleton's Journal in New York. Ingersoll described Yount's expertise as a hunter, including a story that he once killed 70 antelope in one day during a competition with another hunter, but that Yount was ashamed of the accomplishment because "it went against his heart to kill so many innocent creatures just for the glory."

Yount would fill a wagon full of freshly killed game, and then sell the meat in towns such as Laramie and Cheyenne. According to Ingersoll, Yount was quite careful about his personal appearance: "his belt, holster, knife-sheath, bridle, and saddle are all set off with a barbaric glitter." Yount paid a Shoshone woman to decorate his buckskin jacket, "a marvel of fringes, fur trimming and intricate embroidery of beads." Ingersoll wrote that Yount was "by nature a gentleman, and under his sinewy frame and tireless strength, there is a heart as tender as a girl's, which hates the cruelty his profession unavoidably occasions. His eye is open to every beautiful feature of the grand world in which he lives; his heart is alive to all the gentle influences of the original wilderness." Ingersoll's 1883 book, Knocking 'Round the Rockies, describes Yount in a similar fashion.

== Guide for the Hayden Geological Survey ==
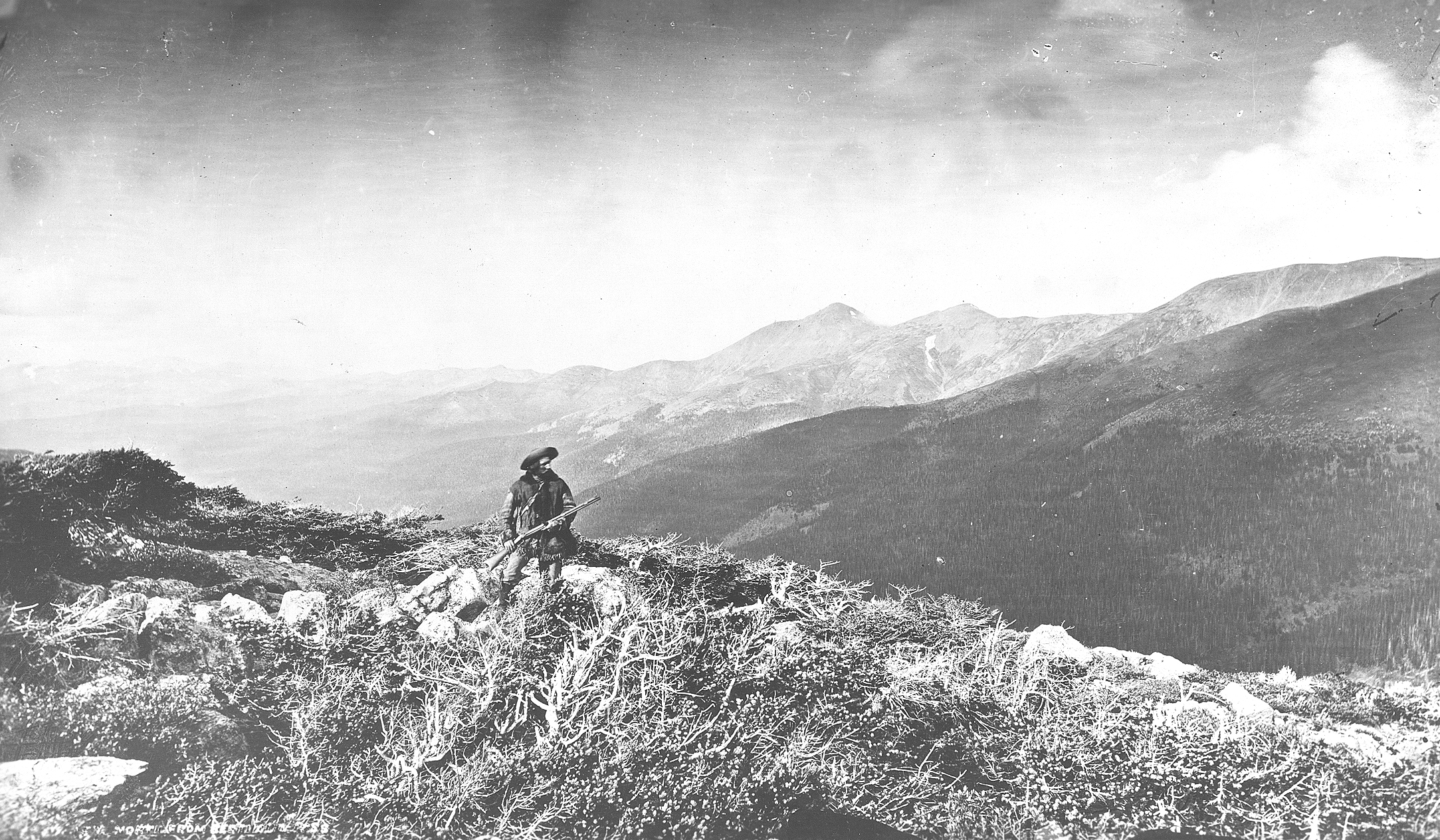
Harry Yount atop Berthoud Pass in the Rocky Mountains of Colorado

In 1872 or 1873, Yount was hired as a seasonal guide, wrangler and packer for geological survey expeditions with the aim of mapping broad swaths of the Rocky Mountains. The Hayden Survey, led by Ferdinand Vandeveer Hayden and funded by the Department of the Interior, was one of several regional survey projects that were combined to form the United States Geological Survey in 1879. Hayden had been one of the leading advocates for the creation of Yellowstone National Park, which President Ulysses S. Grant signed into law on March 1, 1872.

Yount worked for Hayden's expeditions each summer for seven years during the 1870s, in what are now the states of New Mexico, Arizona, Utah, Wyoming and Colorado. Each winter during the period, Yount would hunt and trap in the Laramie Range in Wyoming.

In 1874, Yount was assigned to hunt for a party led by the geologist Archibald Marvine. Yount was later charged by a "huge" grizzly bear, and fired four gunshots – one through the skull, two through the flanks, and a final shot into the heart – before the bear was brought down.

During Hayden's expedition of 1877, Yount engaged in mountaineering with Ingersoll and the cartographer A. D. Wilson in the Wind River Range. They were the first to ascend the south slopes of Wind River Peak, and, with Wilson, Yount was the first to ascend West Atlantic Peak. Hayden's expedition of 1878 conducted surveys in Yellowstone National Park and surrounding areas in 1878. That expedition included the British mountaineer James Eccles and Eccles's favorite Swiss mountain guide, Michel Payot of Chamonix. Eccles wanted to attempt an ascent of the Grand Teton, then unclimbed. This was the third attempt to climb the Grand Teton by members of Hayden's expeditions. Yount served as the guide in a four-man party that included Eccles, Payot and Wilson. Eccles and Payot were held up by the disappearance of two mules carrying their gear, and so were unable to accompany Wilson and Yount on to the higher parts of the mountain. During the climb, Yount slipped on the ice and fell close to a deep chasm in the glacier, where water was streaming down from the cliff above. The hold of his buckskin pants on the ice reportedly prevented him from being carried down into the crevice. Wilson was quoted as saying that Yount was clinging to the rock like "a starfish hanging to a breakwater," and that he himself lowered a rope to assist Yount. Because of the delay and the absence of the experienced Alpine climbers, Yount and Wilson had to turn back a few hundred feet short of the summit, at a spur called The Enclosure. No previous party had come so close to reaching the summit. The undisputed first ascent of the Grand Teton took place 20 years later, in 1898.

== Gamekeeper in Yellowstone National Park ==
Yount was hired as the first gamekeeper for Yellowstone National Park in 1880, at a salary of $1,000 per year, when the park's entire budget was just $15,000 per year. He was appointed by Carl Schurz, the Secretary of the Interior and a former Union Army general, on June 21, 1880, and reported for duty at Yellowstone on July 6. His supervisor was Philetus Norris, the second park superintendent. Shortly after Yount reported for duty, Yount escorted Schurz and his party on a tour of the park, and then conducted a survey of the park's wildlife. Yount began constructing a winter camp at the junction of the East Fork of the Yellowstone River and Soda Butte Valley, a location he chose because it allowed for the protection of herds of buffalo and elk against poachers.

Yount submitted his first Report of Gamekeeper on November 25, 1880, which was included as Appendix A to the annual report of the Secretary of the Interior. His report described his activities since being hired. He recommended:

The appointment of a small, active, reliable police force, to receive regular pay during the spring and summer at least, when animals are likely to be slaughtered by tourists and mountaineers. It is evident that such a force could, in addition to the protection of game, assist the superintendent of the Park in enforcing the laws, rules and regulations for protection of guide-boards and bridges, and the preservation of the countless and widely scattered geyser-cones and other matchless wonders of the Park.

In his report of September 30, 1881, Yount described how he spent the unusually severe winter of 1880–1881, and his efforts to prevent poaching by tourists and Indians, while still hunting to provide food for the park staff. Yount reported that snow had fallen on 66 of 90 days between December 1880 and February 1881. He described the range and habits of Yellowstone's large mammals and expressed regret for "the unfortunate breakage of my thermometer when it could not be replaced," along with a submitted synopsis of the weather the previous winter. In this report, he resigned his position "to resume private enterprises now requiring my personal attention," and concluded with a clear recommendation:

I do not think that any one man appointed by the honorable Secretary, and specifically designated as a gamekeeper, is what is needed or can prove effective for certain necessary purposes, but a small and reliable police force of men, employed when needed, during good behavior, and dischargeable for cause by the superintendent of the park, is what is really the most practicable way of seeing that the game is protected from wanton slaughter, the forests from careless use of fire, and the enforcement of all the other laws, rules, and regulations for the protection and improvement of the park.

There are indications that Yount had a difference of opinion with park superintendent Norris, who wanted him to spend more of his time building roads for the convenience of tourists, while Yount preferred to concentrate on protecting the wildlife.

== Recognition as first National Park ranger ==
Although Yount's official job title was "gamekeeper" rather than "park ranger", and although he only worked in Yellowstone National Park for 14 months, his two annual reports had a lasting impact on the administration of the national parks in the United States. He is "securely positioned in the legend and culture" of the National Park Service, and is considered a figure of "historic proportion". In Oh, Ranger!, a book published in 1928, Horace Albright, who later became the second director of the National Park Service, wrote that "Harry Yount pointed out in a report that it was impossible for one man to patrol the park. He urged the formation of a ranger force. So Harry Yount is credited with being the father of the ranger service, as well as the first US Park Ranger." Stephen Mather, the first director of the National Park Service, wrote the foreword of the book.

== Prospecting and later years ==
After Yount resigned from his job in Yellowstone, he lived for a while in Uva, Wyoming. He homesteaded in the area in 1887 but his claim was sold in a sheriff's sale in 1892. He spent nearly 40 years prospecting in the Laramie Mountains, and developed copper and graphite mining claims. He settled in Wheatland, Wyoming, and worked on developing a marble mining claim west of there. Yount was actively involved in prospecting until the day before his death, when he had been looking for a ride to inspect a possible gold deposit. On May 16, 1924, he walked into downtown Wheatland, as was his daily habit, where he collapsed and died of heart failure near a Lutheran church. He was buried in the Lakeview Cemetery in Cheyenne.

== Legacy ==
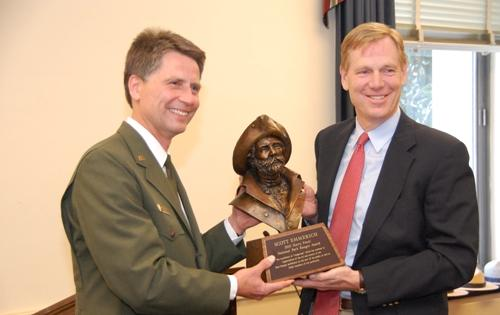
Scott Emmerich receives the 2010 Harry Yount Award from Will Shafroth

Younts Peak, which is 12,156 feet (3,705 metres) high and located in the Absaroka Range at the headwaters of the Yellowstone River, is named after Yount. The peak's name was bestowed by the Hayden Geological Survey. Long after his death, in the 1970s, Yount's marble mining claim finally went into production. It yielded crushed marble for use in landscaping and aquariums.

In 1994, the National Park Service established the Harry Yount Award, given annually to an employee whose "overall impact, record of accomplishments, and excellence in traditional ranger duties have created an appreciation for the park ranger profession." This award is given both nationally and regionally. According to Supernaugh, Yount is "credited with setting the standards for performance and service by which the public has come to judge the rangers of today".

== See also ==
- Hayden Geological Survey of 1871
