= Younts Peak =

Mountain in Wyoming, United States

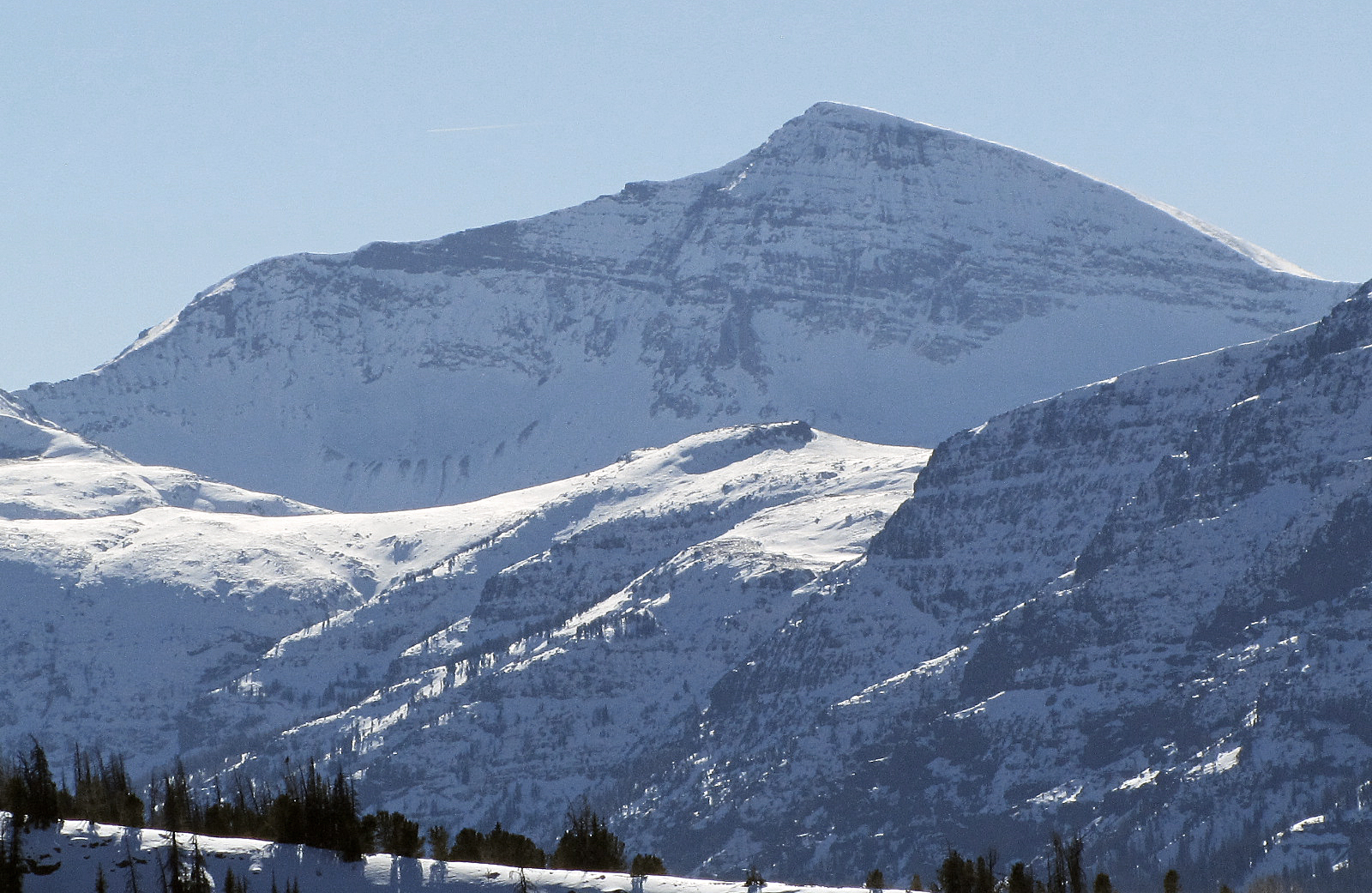
- Younts Peak in Bridger-Teton National Forest

Highest point
- Elevation: 12,156 ft (3,705 m)
- Prominence: 2,241 ft (683 m)
- Coordinates: 43°58′56″N 109°52′00″W

Geography
- Location within Wyoming
- Location: Park County, Wyoming, U.S.
- Parent range: Absaroka Range
- Topo map: USGS Younts Peak

Climbing
- Easiest route: Hike

Younts Peak is a peak in the Absaroka Range in northwestern Wyoming in the United States and the highest point in the Teton Wilderness. The Yellowstone River is formed near the peak from two streams that rise on the northern and southern ridges of the peak and join at the base of the western ridge. The peak summit itself can be hiked, but accessing the peak is difficult due to its remoteness.

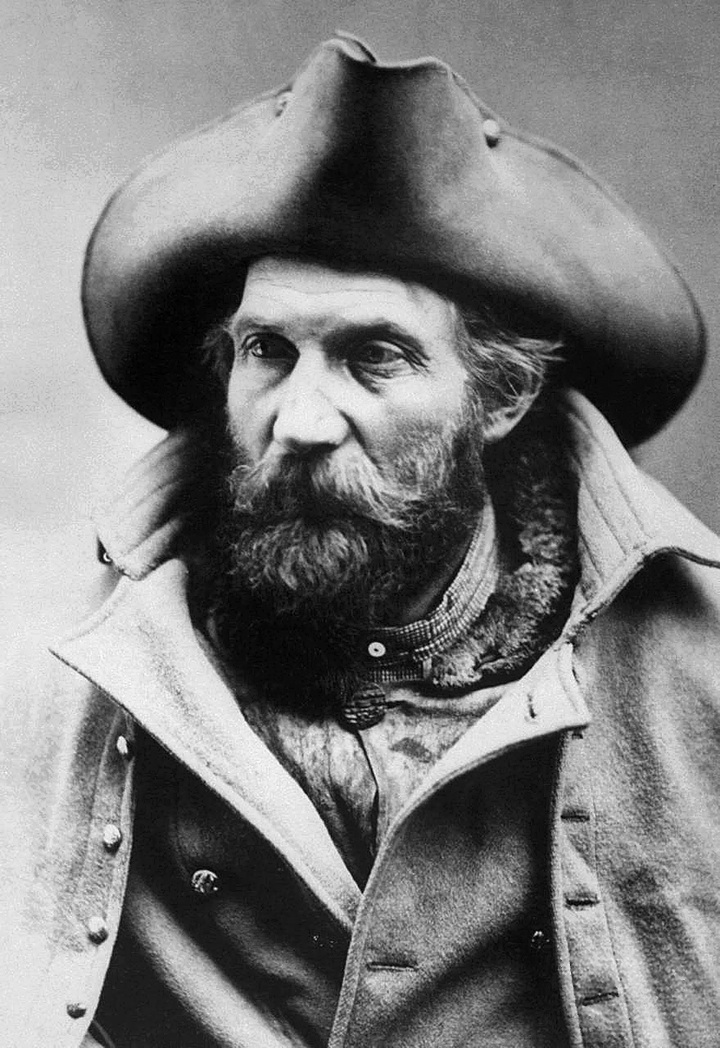
Younts Peak namesake, Harry Yount

The peak was named after Harry Yount, a hunter and guide considered to be the first ranger in Yellowstone National Park.
