= Emerald Pool (Yuba River) =

Emerald Pool is a pool in California along the Yuba River. 39.3213°N 120.6558°W The South Yuba River flows down a 60 feet (18 m) waterfall into a sheer rock canyon with two pools. The walls around the first pool measure from around 30 feet (9.1 m) to 80 feet (24 m) in height with a length of around 50 metres (160 ft) and width of around 30 metres (98 ft). The crystal-clear water is deep, 27 feet (8.2 m) near the middle of the pool, and many people jump off the cliffs for enjoyment. A second pool nearby is nearly as large. Despite the cool water temperature it is a popular swimming spot, particularly among young adults.
