= Philetus Norris =

American trapper and second superintendent of Yellowstone National Park

Philetus W. Norris
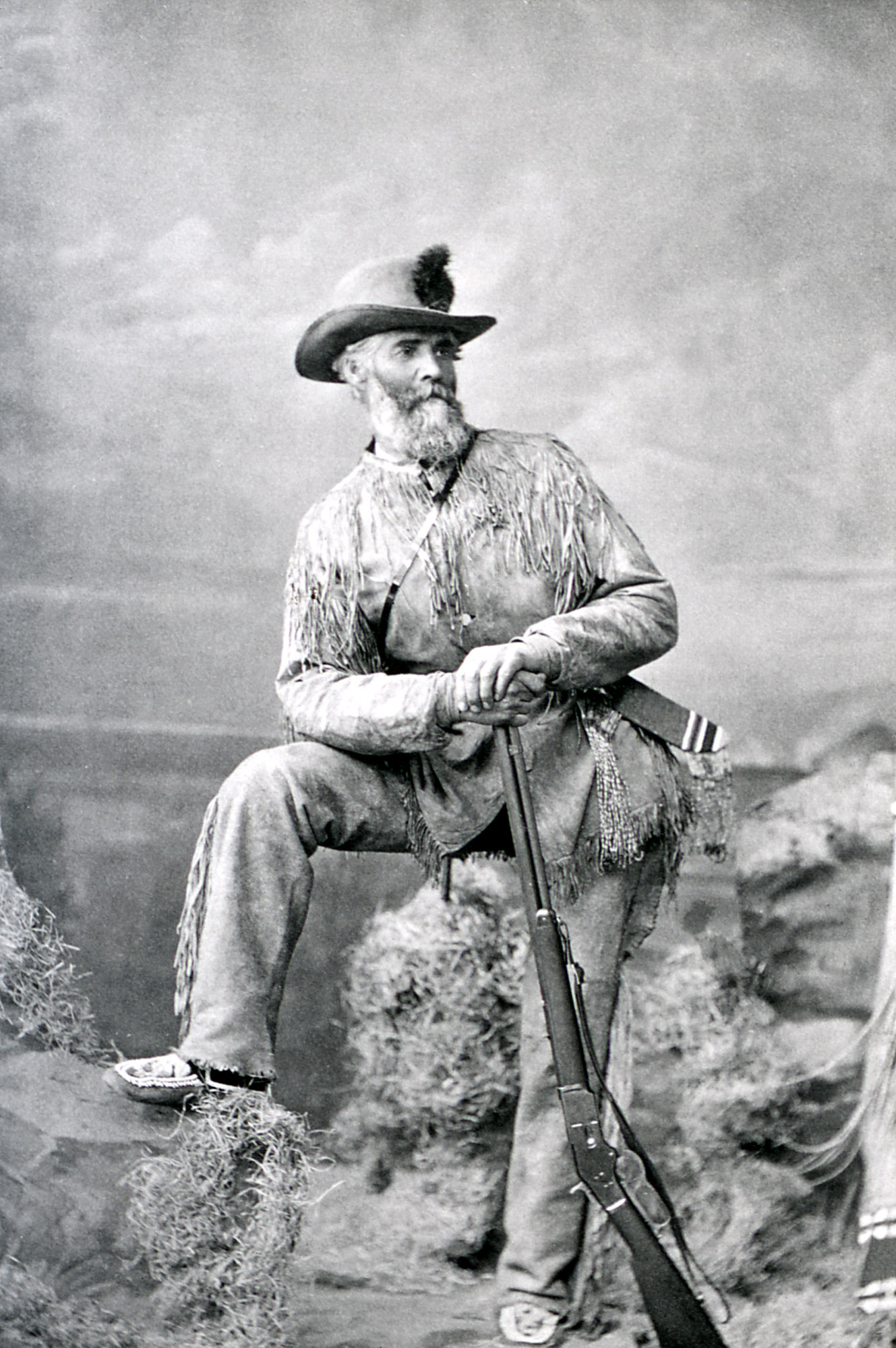
- Norris as superintendent, in the pose of a trapper
- Born: August 17, 1821; Palmyra, New York
- Died: January 14, 1885 (aged 63); Rocky Hill, Kentucky
- Occupation(s): Pioneer, park superintendent
- Spouse: Jane K. Cottrell
- Children: Edward, Aurelia, Ida and Arthur
- Parent(s): John Norris, Jr. and Azubah Phelps

Philetus Walter Norris (August 17, 1821 – January 14, 1885) was an American pioneer, businessman, Union Army officer and politician who was the second superintendent of Yellowstone National Park and was the first person to be paid for that position. He fought in the Civil War, served as a spy behind Confederate lines, and rose to the rank of colonel. He was elected to the Ohio Legislature and founded the town of Norris in Wayne County (now within Detroit), where he ran a real estate business. Mount Norris in Yellowstone is named after him.

== Early life ==
Philetus Walter Norris was born in Palmyra, New York on August 17, 1821, the son of John Norris, Jr. and Azubah Phelps. His father was a pioneer mill-builder, and had fought in the War of 1812. In the early 1820s, the family moved to Allegheny County in New York. In 1826, they bought 80 acres (320,000 m^{2}) in Michigan, moving there soon thereafter. There, they survived through the Black Hawk War and several cholera plagues. John Norris fell ill, and Philetus was forced to help his mother support their rather large family.

== Pre-Yellowstone years ==
Norris left school early to become a trapper. He traveled all around the midwest to trap and trade. In 1838, Norris settled in northwest Ohio near the home of a good friend. In 1845, Norris married Jane K. Cottrell of Fayette, Ohio. Once married, the couple became two of the original settlers of Pioneer, Ohio. They had four children: Edward, Aurelia, Ida and Arthur. In Pioneer, Norris built a steam mill and worked as a land agent. In the span between 1850 and 1860, Norris also travelled to the western states.

When the Civil War began, Norris joined the Union troops, eventually rising to the rank of Colonel. He served as a spy behind Confederate Lines and Captain of the West Virginia Mountain Scouts. While fighting near Laurel Mountain, West Virginia, Norris's horse was shot out from underneath him, severely injuring his shoulder and spinal cord.

After his injury, Norris returned to Pioneer and was elected to the Ohio Legislature. Later, he became a member of the United States Sanitary Commission, caring for the wounded at the Battle of Spotsylvania Court House, and also served at the Confederate prison on Kelley's Island.

After the Civil War, Norris moved to Michigan, where he managed land which belonged to officers and soldiers of both the Union and Confederate armies as part of a federal contract. In 1873, he founded the town of Norris, now within the boundaries of Detroit but then in Wayne County and built the Two Way Inn, which was originally the village's jail and general store. He lived there for a few years until he built a nearby house, which is now on the National Register of Historic Places. There he ran a real estate business.

To ensure the success of his community, Norris drained the creek that ran through the area to open up land for farming. He also recruited the railroad to run through the area and maintained the plank road that ran between Detroit and Mount Clemens, operating a tollbooth located in the village.

In 1870, Norris again traveled west, entering the Yellowstone Park area; he returned again in 1875. During this time, Norris wrote a series of articles on "The Great West" which were published in the Norris, Michigan Suburban.

== Yellowstone ==
In 1877, Norris became the second superintendent of Yellowstone National Park, a position he held until 1882. It was only in June 1878, however, that Congress finally approved a salary of $10,000 a year for the park's superintendent, as well as minimal funds "to protect, preserve, and improve the Park." Norris hired Harry Yount to control poaching and vandalism in the park, leading Yount to be considered the first National Park ranger.

When Norris arrived in 1877 there were approximately 32 miles (51 km) of roads and 108 miles (173 km) of trails. By the time he left in 1882, there were five times as many roads and twice as many trails. The roads were crude and many described them as only "fair" wagon trails. Still, they provided access to "the land of wonders."

While superintendent, Norris published five annual reports. Three mountain peaks, including Mount Norris, one geyser basin, and one pass in Yellowstone are named after Norris.

== Afterward ==
Norris was removed from his post at Yellowstone in 1882 due to political maneuvering. In 1883, he published a volume of verse entitled, The calumet of the Coteau, and other poetical legends of the border. Also, a glossary of Indian names, words and western provincialisms. Together with a guide-book of the Yellowstone national park.

Afterward, he worked in ethnological research for the Smithsonian Institution. In 1885, Norris fell ill in Rocky Hill, Kentucky, while working for the Smithsonian. After a brief illness, he died in Rocky Hill, on January 14, 1885. He was buried at Elmwood Cemetery in Detroit three days later, and shortly thereafter his body was moved to Woodmere Cemetery.

== See also ==
- Criel Mound
