= John P. Yount =

United States Army Medal of Honor awardee

- Born: March 8, 1850; Henry County, Iowa, United States
- Died: December 11, 1872 (aged 22); Fort McPherson, Nebraska
- Burial place: Oak Grove Cemetery
- Military career
- Allegiance: United States of America
- Branch: United States Army
- Service years: 1871–1872
- Rank: Private
- Unit: 3rd U.S. Cavalry
- Conflicts: Indian Wars
- Awards: Medal of Honor

John P. Yount (March 8, 1850 – December 11, 1872) was a soldier in the U.S. Army who served with the 3rd U.S. Cavalry during the Apache Wars against Cochise. In 1871, he was one of five men to receive the Medal of Honor for "gallantry in action" against an Apache raiding party in the Whetstone Mountains. Yount attempted to rescue a wounded civilian Indian scout during the battle, and after the scout was killed, continued to defend the body preventing the enemy from mutilating it afterwards. According to author and Iowa State Senator Dennis H. Black, Yount is one of 11 men from Henry County, Iowa to receive the Medal of Honor.

== Biography ==
John P. Yount was born in Henry County, Iowa on March 8, 1850. Few details of his early life are known, however he left Iowa for California as a young man and worked as a carpenter prior to enlisting in the U.S. Army in Sacramento around 1871. He was assigned to Company F of the 3rd U.S. Cavalry, then fighting against the Apache in the Arizona Territory, patrolling the Sonoita and Santa Cruz Valleys in southern Arizona. On his first mission in May 1871, he accompanied Lieutenant Howard B. Cushing who led a 16-man unit to search the surrounding Whetstone Mountains for Cochise after an Apache raid against a local settlement.

After a week of searching, a young Apache woman was seen by cavalry troopers riding a horse down a nearby mountain trail. Cushing ordered Sergeant John Mott and three other men to follow her. Mott, expecting an ambush, prepared his men and when the attack finally came they were able to hold the Apache at bay until reinforcements could arrive. Indeed, upon hearing the fighting, Cushing ordered his men to rescue Mott and his men despite being heavily outnumbered. When a civilian Indian scout was wounded, Yount attempted to rescue him while under heavy gunfire. After the scout died, Yount and another private continued to remain at his side to protect his body from being mutilated by the Apaches. Cushing, as well as the civilian scout, were killed in the fighting and the battle proved inconclusive. Cochise is believed to have most likely been in Mexico during this time.

Yount was given the Medal of Honor for his actions, officially receiving the award on November 13, 1871, and transferred to Fort McPherson, Nebraska where he died of typhoid fever the following year. His body was brought back to Iowa by his family and had him buried at Oak Grove Cemetery in Mount Pleasant. In early-2007, Yount's grave was rediscovered and a special government headstone was placed at the site in May. On September 30, 2007, a memorial service was held at his gravesite and given full military honors and a new headstone was added to officially commemorate his army service and status as an MOH recipient. The service was also accompanied by a rifle salute and taps, performed by members of the Henry County Honor Guard, and members of the 3rd Iowa Cavalry re-enactors group appearing in period clothing.

Over a hundred people were in attendance including William Johnson of the State Historical Society of Iowa, members of the Medal of Honor Society from Missouri and Idaho and representatives from Henry County veterans groups. Several of Yount's descendants were also invited to the service and his great-great grand niece Joyce Hileman Garretson was interviewed by Mt. Pleasant News. Also joining the ceremony were Mayor John Freeland, State Representative David Heaton and State Senator Dennis H. Black. Black, who spoke at the ceremony, also authored Profiles of Valor - Iowa's Medal of Honor recipients and claimed Yount as one of eleven men from Henry County to receive the Medal of Honor.

== Medal of Honor citation ==
Rank and organization: Private, Company F, 3d U.S. Cavalry. Place and date: At Whetstone Mountains, Ariz., 5 May 1871. Entered service at: ------. Birth: Putnam County, Ind. Date of issue: 13 November 1871.

Citation:

Gallantry in action with Indians.

== See also ==
- List of Medal of Honor recipients
