= Castor and Pollux (disambiguation) =

Castor and Pollux in Greek and Roman mythology, are the twin sons of Lēda and Zeus/Tyndareus, who were transformed into the constellation Gemini.

Castor and Pollux may refer to:

- Castor (star) and Pollux (star), two stars in the constellation Gemini
- Castor and Pollux (elephants), two elephants kept at the zoo of the Jardin d'Acclimatation or Jardin des Plantes in Paris
- Castor and Pollux (Prado), an ancient Roman sculptural group
- Castor et Pollux, an opera by Jean-Philippe Rameau
- Castor and Pollux River, in Nunavut, Canada
- Castor and Pollux, a composition by Harry Partch
- Temple of Castor and Pollux, in the Roman Forum, Rome
- Castor (mountain) and Pollux (mountain), twin mountain peaks in the Pennine Alps on the Italian/Swiss border
- Castor and Pollux Peak, two summits in Yellowstone National Park in Wyoming, USA
- Castor & Pollux (1790 ship), a British ship built at Teignmouth in 1790
- Castor and Pollux Troy, characters in the 1997 film Face/Off
- Operation Castor and Operation Pollux, twin French Union operations in the First Indochina War

== See also ==
- Castor (disambiguation)
- Pollux (disambiguation)
