= SS Pollux =

SS Pollux may refer to:

- SS Pollux, a whaler and exploration ship later renamed SS Southern Cross (1886)
- SS Pollux (1883), a Swedish steamer
- USS Pollux (SP-2573), a United States Navy cargo ship in commission from 3 to 24 April 1918 known both before and after her U.S. Navy service as SS Pollux
- USNS Pollux, ex-T-AK-290, a United States Navy vehicle cargo ship in non-commissioned Military Sealift Command service from 1981 to 2007, known since her transfer to the Ready Reserve Force in 2008 as SS Pollux
- HNLMS Pollux, a steamship taken into service with the Royal Netherlands Navy during World War II

== See also ==
- Pollux (disambiguation)
- USS Pollux
