= Pollex =

Pollex may refer to:

- The thumb
- An Ancient Roman unit of measurement, equivalent to approximately 24.6 mm. See also: Uncia (unit)
- Pollex, a genus of moths.

== See also ==
- Pollux (disambiguation)
