= Elephant meat =

Edible flesh of an elephant

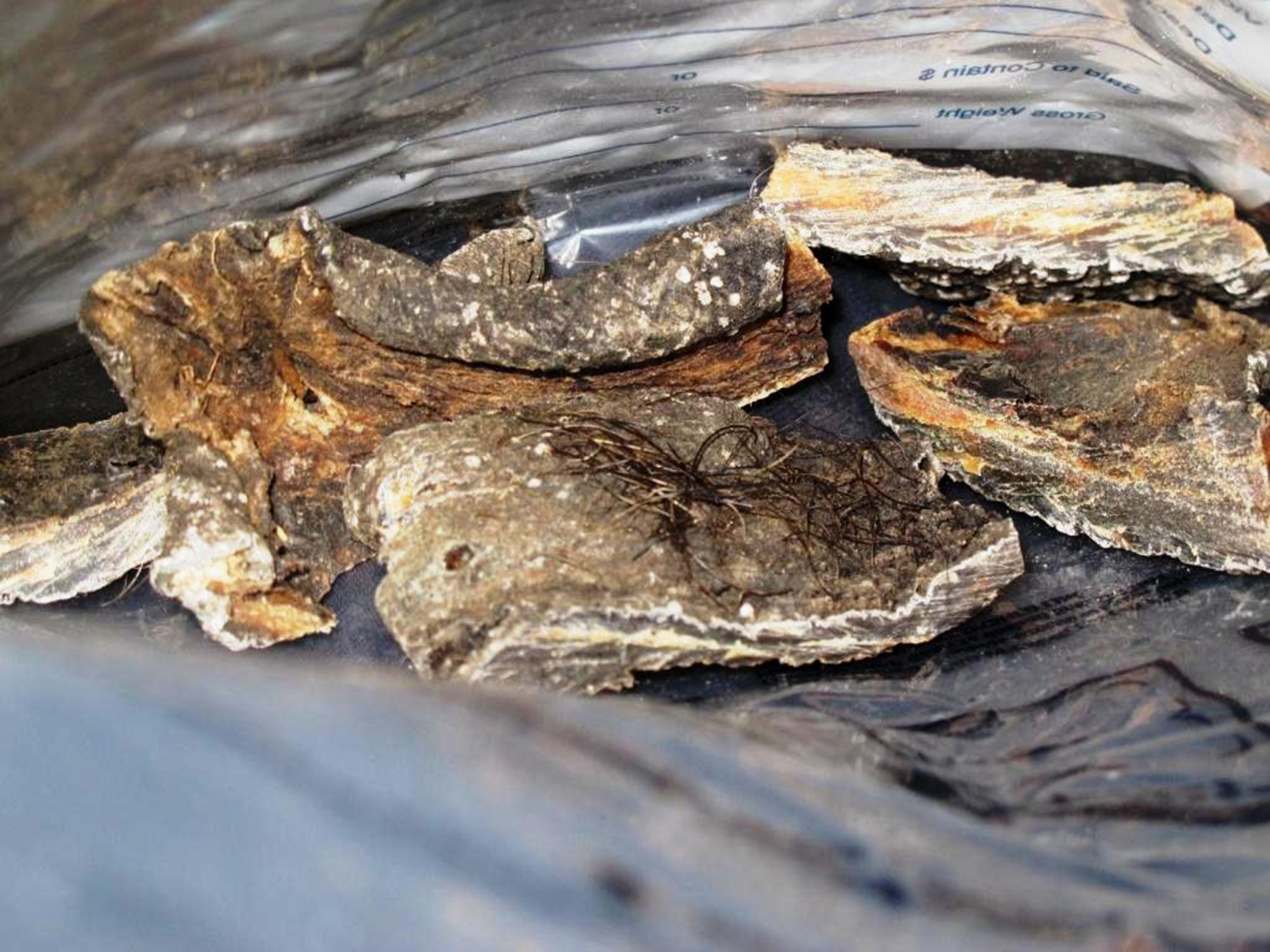
Elephant meat seized by U.S. Customs and Border Protection officers

Elephant meat is the flesh and other edible parts of elephants. Elephants have been hunted for their meat since prehistoric times, with traditional elephant hunting being historically practiced by some modern African hunter-gatherer groups. Elephant meat is also widely illegally sold as bushmeat in parts of Africa, which has sparked concerns that the demand for bushmeat is driving poaching.

== Characteristics ==
The bodies of elephants have a relatively high fat content, with one prominent fatty area being the foot pads of the feet. The long bones of elephants lack significant marrow cavities. Elephant flesh has been described as appetising in historical accounts (though reportedly tough when cooked over a fire), with the meat of juveniles being reportedly considered tastier than that of adults by some African hunter gatherer groups.

== Prehistory ==
Elephant meat has been consumed by hominins for thousands of years. One of the oldest sites suggested to represent elephant butchery is from the Dmanisi Paleolithic site, Georgia in the Caucasus, where cut marks found on the bones of the extinct mammoth species Mammuthus meridionalis, which dates to around 1.8 million years ago, with other butchery sites for this species reported from Spain dating to around 1.2 million years ago. Other early elephant butchery sites are known for the extinct elephant species Palaeoloxodon recki in East Africa, dating from 1.8 million years ago (Emiliano Aguirre Korongo at Olduvai Gorge) to 700,000 years ago. These early sites may have been the result of scavenging. The earliest reliable evidence for elephant hunting is from Lehringen in Germany, where the skeleton of a straight-tusked elephant (Palaeoloxodon antiquus) dating to the Last Interglacial (around 125,000 years ago) displaying butchery marks was found with a wooden spear (the Lehringen spear) likely made by Neanderthals. During the Last Glacial Period, modern humans as well as likely Neanderthals hunted woolly mammoths (Mammuthus primigenius), with North American Columbian mammoths (Mammuthus columbi) being hunted shortly prior to their extinction by Palaeoindians, the first humans to inhabit the Americas. In some Palaeolithic hunter-gatherer groups (such as the North American Clovis culture), mammoths are thought to have made up a significant proportion of their diet. Hunting of mammoths by humans may have been a decisive factor in their decline and extinction.

== Modern times ==
Today, all species of elephant are hunted specifically for their meat. This occurs notably in Cameroon, Central African Republic, Republic of Congo, and the Democratic Republic of Congo. During ivory hunts by poachers, meat may be taken as a by-product for eventual sale, or to feed the hunting party. As of 2007, wildlife experts expressed concerns that the major threat to elephants may become the demand for meat rather than the ivory trade. Organisations such as the WWF and TRAFFIC are campaigning to reduce consumption levels as this, along with the ivory trade, leads to as many as 55 individuals being killed a day.

=== Hunting of elephants by African hunter gatherers ===
African forest elephants (Loxodonta cyclotis) are hunted by various hunter-gather groups in the Congo basin, including by Mbuti pygmies, among others. It is unknown how long the active hunting of elephants in the region has been practised, and it may have only begun as a response for the demand for ivory beginning in the 19th century or earlier. Elephants are traditionally hunted using spears, typically to stab at the lower abdomen (as is done among the Mbuti) or knees, both of which are effective at rendering the animal immobile. Anthropologist Mitsuo Ichikawa observed the hunting of elephants by Mbuti pygmies in fieldwork during the 1970s and 1980s, when the Mbuti used spears tipped with metal points (though earlier reports suggest that that prior to this they used purely wooden spears, which may have been less effective at breaking the elephants hide). As observed by Ichikawa, elephant hunting by the Mbuti pygmies involved both small and large groups of hunters, which was led by at least one experienced hunter called a mtuma. Before the hunt began, ritual acts of singing and dancing were performed by the community to support the success of the hunt. These hunters often went into the forest without food, living off of wild honey and vegetables, smearing themselves in mud, elephant dung, and charcoal made from certain plants to disguise their scent from the elephants. Once the traces of an elephant are detected, it was carefully tracked, before being approached from downwind and stabbed. It typically took several hours to several days from the first stab to the death of the elephant. Many hunts failed due to elephants detecting the hunters before being stabbed and fleeing, with field research by Ichikawa finding that only 1 out of 6 Mbuti elephant hunts were successful in a 6 month period, corresponding to around 60–70 days of total hunting time, meaning that despite the large quantity of meat provided by each individual elephant, it did not provide reliable subsistence, with the Mbuti instead relying on hunting smaller animals. Following the death of the animal, the Mbuti hunters returned to their homes, with the whole community moving to dismember the elephant carcass. Meat was shared equally among the community with the exception of a few body parts which were reserved for certain community members, with the feast on the animal's remains lasting for several days. Elephant hunting was a dangerous activity that was known to result in the deaths of hunters.

In modern times, among the Baka people of the Congo, elephant hunts involve a party of hunters, most of which carry only spears, while the lead hunter carries a shotgun provided by neighbouring farmers or merchants. The party goes out in search of elephant tracks (from which the hunters can distinguish between new and old), as well as searching for honey, which augments the food rationed for the hunt. Once the elephant is found, the hunters erect a makeshift campsite nearby, and wait for twilight. Then the lead hunter, usually alone but sometimes with a small number of the party, approaches the elephant, before attempting to shoot it in the heart, or less often, the head, while positioned to the side and posterior of the animal. If the elephant is killed, the party (with the exception of the main hunter) celebrated upon his return to camp. In the following morning, the camp was relocated to the elephant, and racks were set up to smoke its meat, following which the rest of the hunters village community arrived to also feast on the meat. It is customary that the hunter which successfully killed an elephant, along with his relatives (aside from his grandparents and uncles on his mother's side) are barred from consuming its meat, with the hunter and his relatives not attending the feast.

In Zambia, hunter-gather groups have been reported hunting elephants using poisoned spears, with one group described as having a member climb to the top of a tree which hung over well used elephant trails, with other members of the tribe then driving elephants towards the tree, following which the perched spearholder would attempt to stab the elephant between the shoulder blades.

Some groups in Namibia and the Congo are reported have formerly hunted elephants using large pitfall traps.

The ǃKung people of southern Africa are reported to have hunted elephants via surrounding them with fire before spearing them, with unverified reports suggesting they may have also hunted elephants using poisoned arrows.

=== Consumption during the Zambezi expedition ===
Scottish explorer David Livingstone describes how he ate an elephant during the Zambezi expedition in an 1861 letter to Lord Palmerston. He wrote "when we killed an elephant for food, the rest of the herd stood a mile off for two days."

=== Consumption during the 1870 siege of Paris ===
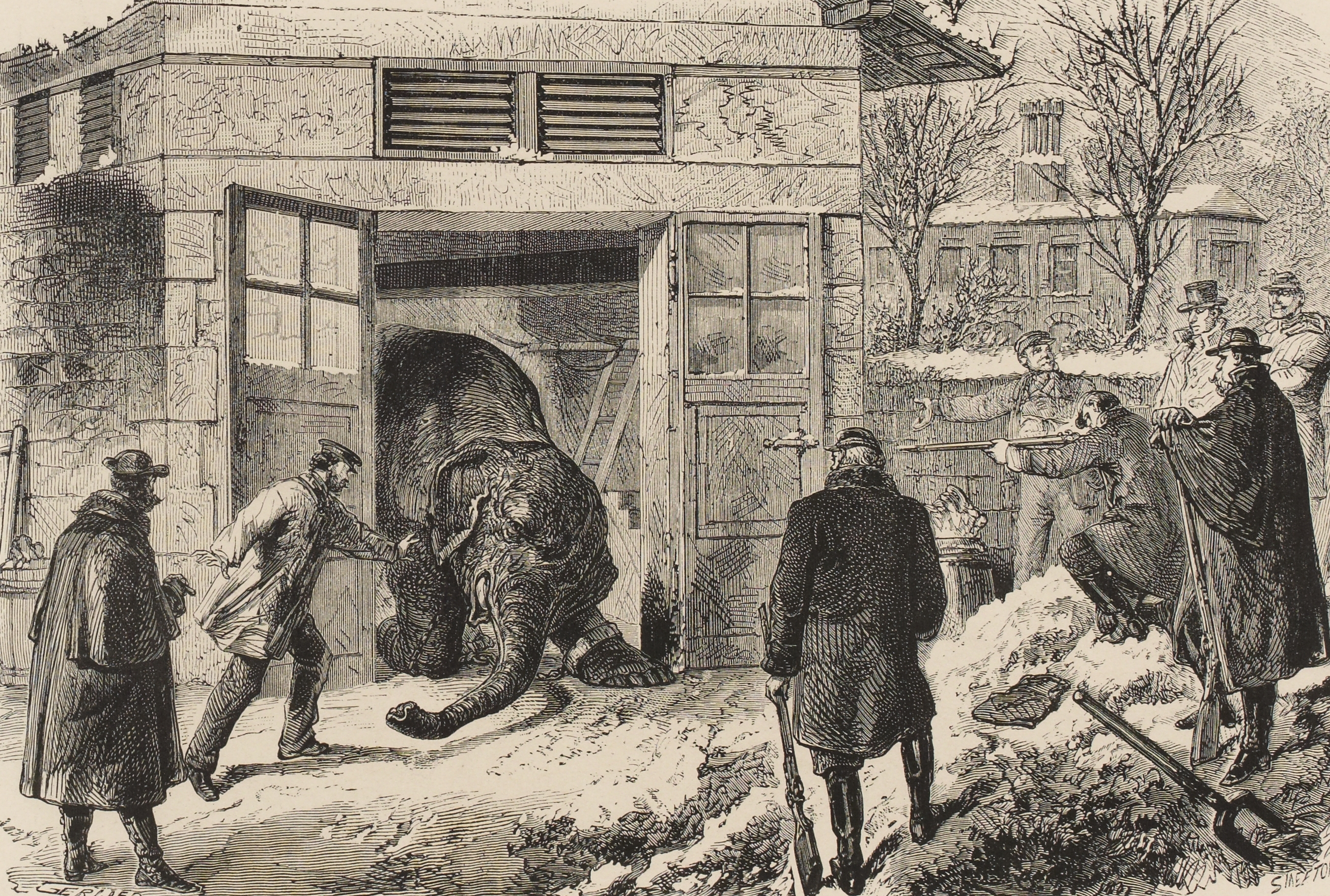
One of two elephants named Castor and Pollux being killed for meat at the zoo Jardin des Plantes in Paris during the siege of Paris in 1870

During the siege of Paris in 1870, elephant meat was consumed, due to a severe shortage of food. Along with other animals at the zoo Jardin des Plantes in Paris, both Castor and Pollux were killed and eaten. Contemporary accounts indicate that elephant meat did not appeal to Parisian diners.

=== Demand ===
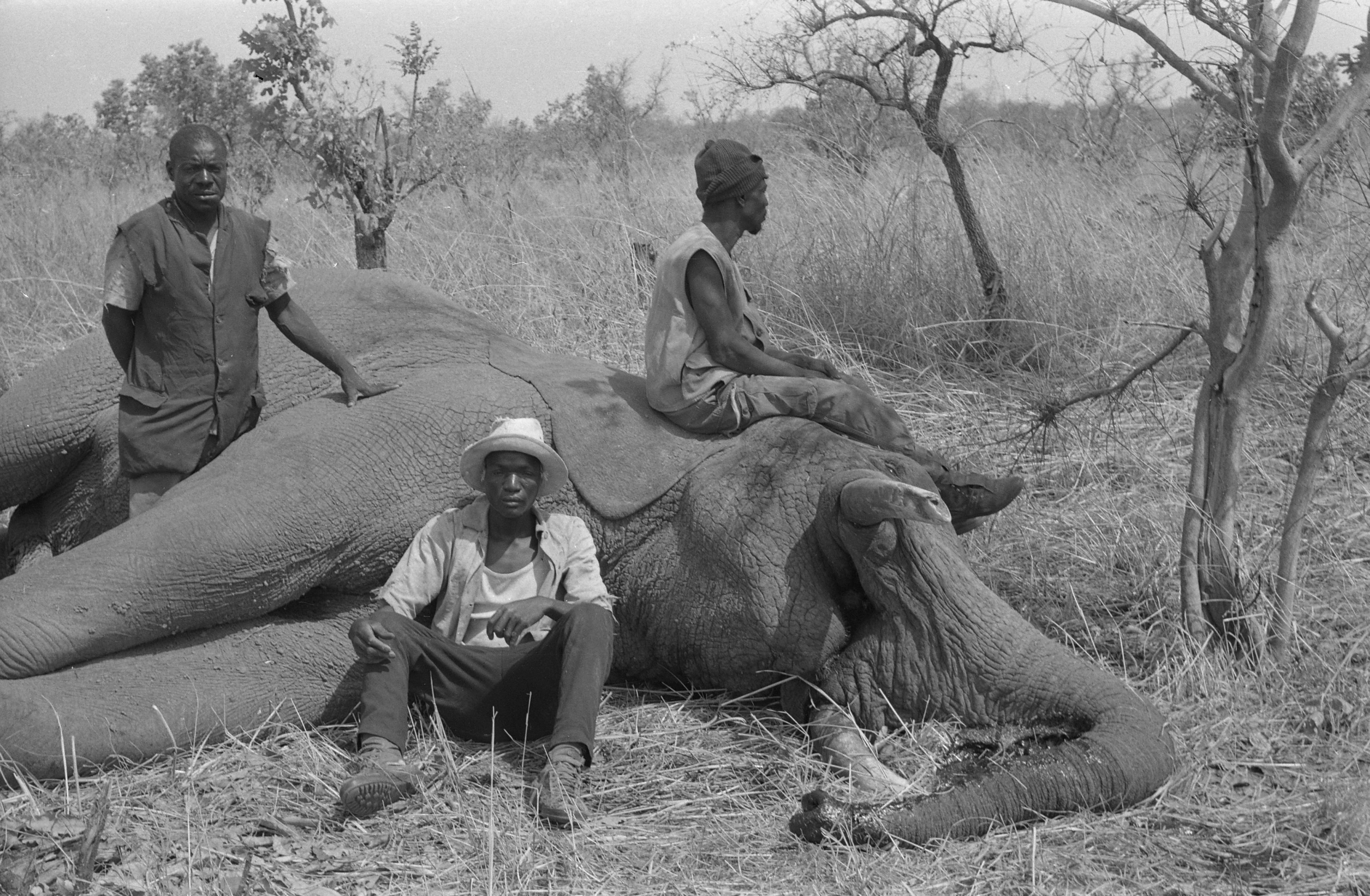
A group of local hunting guides during an elephant hunt in 1970 next to their kill

An investigation into the elephant meat trade revealed that in four central African countries, the demand for the meat is higher than the supply. In cities, the meat is considered to be prestigious, and as such, costs more to buy than most other meats. This acts as an incentive for poachers to hunt elephants for their meat as well as their tusks. Another incentive comes from "commanditaires". These are individuals with wealth, usually people with influence in the military, government, or the business world, and are known to fund elephant hunts. They provide money, equipment, and also weapons. Their main objective is to receive ivory in return, which they sell.

Those working in logging camps provide local demand for elephant meat. Construction of the associated logging roads eases access from areas that were once remote, to sites where the meat can be sold.

Forest elephants in Africa are normally around 2,300 to 2,700 kilograms (5,000–6,000 lb). While the ivory may be sold for around $180 (in 2007), a poacher could sell the meat (approximately 450 kilograms or 1,000 pounds) for up to $6,000. During this time, Africans living in the Congo Basin were earning an average of around $1 per day.

In 2007, elephant meat was selling in Bangui (Central African Republic) markets at $12.0 per kilogram ($5.45/lb). This was at the same time that ivory could be sold by poachers for $30.0 per kilogram ($13.60/lb). The meat was being transported and sold over the border of the Central African Republic and the Democratic Republic of the Congo. Despite being illegal according to international law, both governments collected taxes for the transactions.

In 2012, wildlife officials in Thailand expressed the concern that a new taste for elephant meat consumption could pose a risk to their survival. They were alerted to the problem upon discovering that two elephants in a national park were slaughtered. The director-general of the wildlife agency in Thailand stated that some of the meat was eaten raw.

A 2010 study of elephant bushmeat in Central Africa found that "elephant meat represents an important incentive for poachers to hunt elephants, but that it is secondary to ivory as a driver of illegal elephant killing".

== Preservation ==
The meat may be charred on the outside and smoked at the site where the elephant is killed, to preserve it during transportation to populated areas for sale.

== Statistics ==
Utilization of the meat and earnings estimates in Cameroon, Central African Republic, Republic of Congo, and the Democratic Republic of Congo were compiled as follows by Daniel Stiles in his 2011 Elephant Meat Trade in Central Africa: Summary report:

=== Utilization ===
Utilization of the meat of recalled elephant that were killed:

| Country | Fresh meat consumed by hunters/shared | Smoked meat for personal/shared use | Fresh meat sold | Smoked meat sold | Kills when no meat taken |
|---|---|---|---|---|---|
| Cameroon | 0–12% (2.3%) | 0–40% (10%, or ~100 kg) | 0% | 0–60% (8%, or ~80 kg) | 5 (45%) |
| Central African Republic | 2–5% (3.5%) | 0–165 kg (85 kg) | 0% | 0–630 kg (260 kg) | 1 (13%) |
| Republic of Congo | ~1% | 0–10 kg (6 kg) | 0% | 10–300 kg (100 kg) | 0 |
| Democratic Republic of Congo | ~1% | 0–315 kg (82 kg) | 0% | 0–1000 kg (279 kg) | 1 (14%) |
| Mean range | 1–3.5% | 6–100 kg | 0% | 80–279 kg | 0–5 (0–45%) |

=== Potential earnings ===
Potential earnings estimates from elephant meat (smoked) that was reported as sold:

| Country | Range in kg | Price per kg (US$) | Total earnings (US$) |
|---|---|---|---|
| Cameroon | 0-600* | $2 | $0 to $1,200 |
| Central African Republic | 0 to 630 | $2 to $3.33 | $0 to $2,098 |
| Republic of Congo | 10 to 300 | $2.40 to $3 | $24 to $900 |
| Democratic Republic of Congo | 0 to 1,000 | $1 to $5.55 | $0 to $5,550 |

* 60% of the carcass; see Utilization table above, column "Smoked meat sold"
Ranges begin at zero because not all elephant hunters take the meat; however, in the Republic of Congo sample, all of the reported kills resulted in at least some meat being taken.

== Cultural and religious practices ==
Assamese scriptures prescribe various meats, including that of the elephant, to recover from illness and to stay in good health. Buddhist monks, however, are forbidden from eating elephant meat. Hindus also strictly avoid any contact with elephant meat due to the importance of the god Ganesha who is widely worshiped by Hindus.

The Kalika Purana distinguishes bali (sacrifice), mahabali (great sacrifice), for the ritual killing of goats, elephant, respectively, though the reference to humans in Shakti theology is symbolic and done in effigy in modern times.

Elephant meat is also forbidden by Jewish dietary laws because they do not have cloven hooves and they are not ruminants. Some scholars of Islamic dietary laws have ruled that it is forbidden for Muslims to eat elephant because elephants fall under the prohibited category of fanged or predatory animals.
