= Ménagerie du Jardin des Plantes =

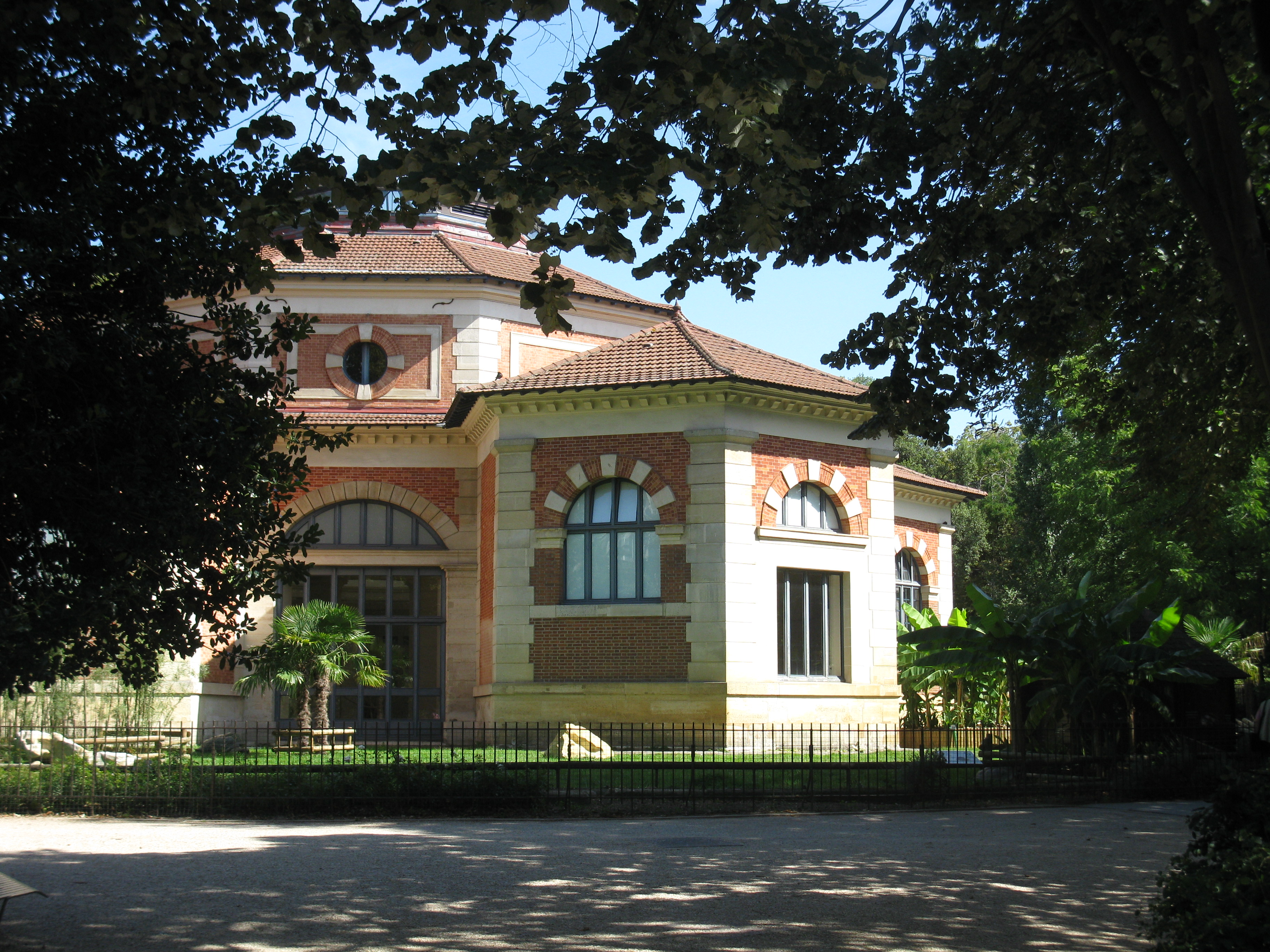
- The Rotonde, today a home for giant tortoises
- Interactive map of Ménagerie du Jardin des Plantes
- 48°50′41″N 2°21′35″E
- Date opened: December 11, 1794
- Location: Paris, France
- Land area: 5.5 ha (14 acres)
- No. of animals: 1,000
- Annual visitors: 500,000
- Memberships: EAZA
- Website: www.mnhn.fr

The Ménagerie du Jardin des Plantes (French pronunciation: [menaʒʁi dy ʒaʁdɛ̃ de plɑ̃t]) is a zoo in Paris, France, belonging to the botanical garden Jardin des Plantes. Founded in 1794, largely with animals brought from the royal zoo of the Palace of Versailles, abandoned because of the French Revolution, it is the second oldest zoological garden in the world (after Tiergarten Schönbrunn). Today, the zoo contains many rare smaller and medium-sized mammals, and a variety of birds and reptiles.

== Location ==
The zoo is located directly by the Seine in the centre of Paris. It takes up about one third of the Jardin des Plantes.

== History ==
=== The botanical garden ===
In the beginning Jardin des Plantes referred only to a botanical garden of 58 acres (230,000 m^{2}), created and built by the royal physicians Jean Herouard and Guy de La Brosse. It therefore became known as the Royal Herb Garden. Created in 1626 and opened for the public in 1635, it is the oldest part of the national research and educational institute for science, the Muséum National d'Histoire Naturelle, which was founded in 1793.

=== The foundation of the menagerie ===
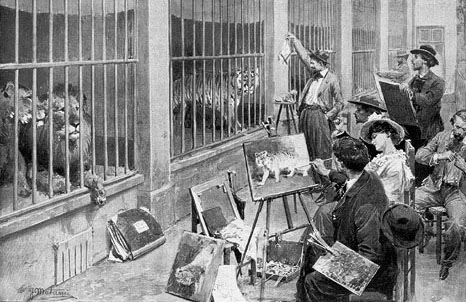
Animal artists at the Jardin des Plantes, Paris. From the magazine L'Illustration, 7 August 1902.

In the course of the French Revolution the menagerie was formally established in 1794. According to a decision of the National Assembly in 1793, exotic animals in private hands were to be donated to the Menagerie in Versailles or killed, stuffed and donated to the natural scientists of the Jardin des Plantes. However, the scientists let the animals (the exact number of which is unknown) live. The Royal Menagerie (Ménagerie Royale) in Versailles was dissolved and these animals were also transferred to the Jardin des Plantes. Jacques-Henri Bernardin de Saint-Pierre (1737–1814) is considered to be the founder of the menagerie. He was committed to the principles of keeping exotic animals in their natural environment, having regard to their needs, placing them under scientific supervision, and allowing public access in the interest of public education.

The Jardin was free for all visitors and tourists right from its inception. While the menagerie at first was just provisional it grew in the first three decades of the 19th century to be the largest exotic animal collection in Europe. The Zoo was under the scientific leadership of the former head of the zoological department at the museum, Étienne Geoffroy Saint-Hilaire (1772–1844). From 1805 onwards the menagerie was under the leadership of Frédéric Cuvier, who was replaced in 1836 by Geoffroy's son Isidore Geoffroy Saint-Hilaire.

== Research ==
The institutional incorporation of the menagerie within the National Research Institute of the National Natural History Museum facilitated the academic study of the animals by doctors and zoologists. Studies related to systematics, morphology and anatomy were all carried out, notably by Georges Cuvier. Étienne Geoffroy, Frédéric Cuvier (the brother of Georges Cuvier) performed research in the area of behavioral observation. Étienne Geoffroy Saint-Hilaire and Frédéric Cuvier published their results in the quarterly work Histoire des Mammifières. It was first published in 1826 and became one of the foundational books concerning the biology of exotic animals. Furthermore, F. Cuvier's plans regarding the breeding of new domestic animal species were formulated.

== Attractions and species growth ==
Plan of the Ménagerie du Jardin des plantes, Paris, France.

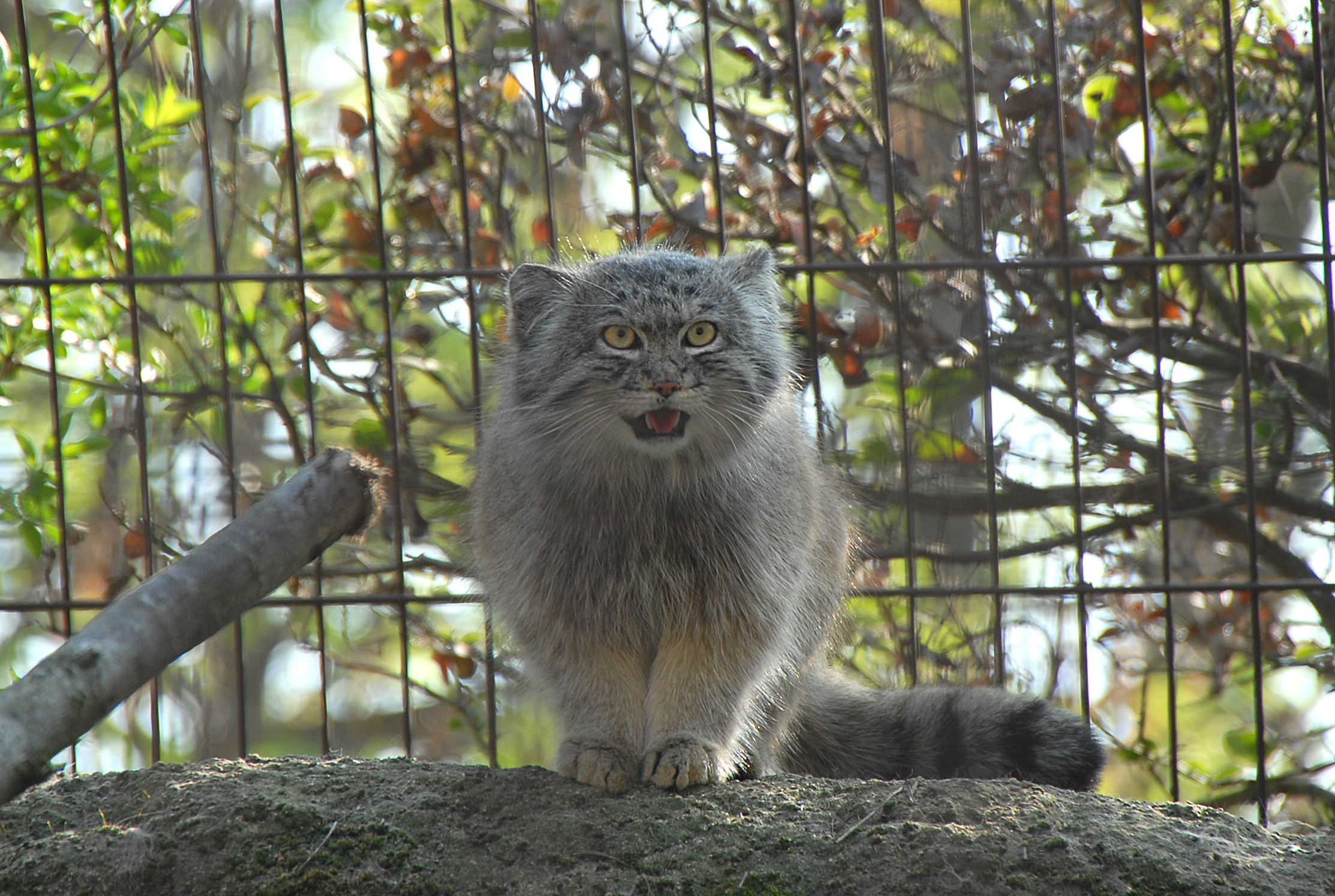
Pallas's cat at the zoo

The expanding range of species was chiefly the result of French travelling researchers, colonial officials and donations from private people, which accounts for the fact that the animals in the Jardine were not limited to local French species.

The so-called Rotonde was added to the basic enclosures in 1804, and from 1808 was used to harbour large animals such as elephants. In 1805 the bear ditch followed and in 1821, a so-called Fauverie or predator enclosure. The Volieren enclosure (voleries, birdhouses) for diurnal birds of prey was added in 1825, and two years later a birdhouse specifically for pheasants. A monkey house was set up for the first time in 1837, while reptiles had to wait until 1870 for their enclosure. Most animals were kept in functional, classicist, gallery-like buildings.

In another part was the Vallée Suisse which had been built as a romantic garden. Here were several small enclosures which held exotic animals such as antelopes. Some buildings from this period still exist today - the semicircular birdhouse for pheasants (1827), the reptile house and the new pheasants enclosure (1881). At the beginning of the 20th century a hibernation enclosure (1905), a small monkey house (1928), a vivarium (1929), another monkey house (1934) and a reptile house (1932) had been built. A half century passed after this improvement without any further innovations except the restoration of the bear pit and some technical corrections.

A new enclosure for diurnal birds of prey was built in 1983. A variety of renovations were carried out in the 1980s. At the beginning of the 21st century the pheasants enclosure from 1881 was renovated. However, as all of the structures are listed buildings, it is almost impossible to create new structures here. However the Jardin des Plantes still exists today and is the second oldest civil zoo in the world.

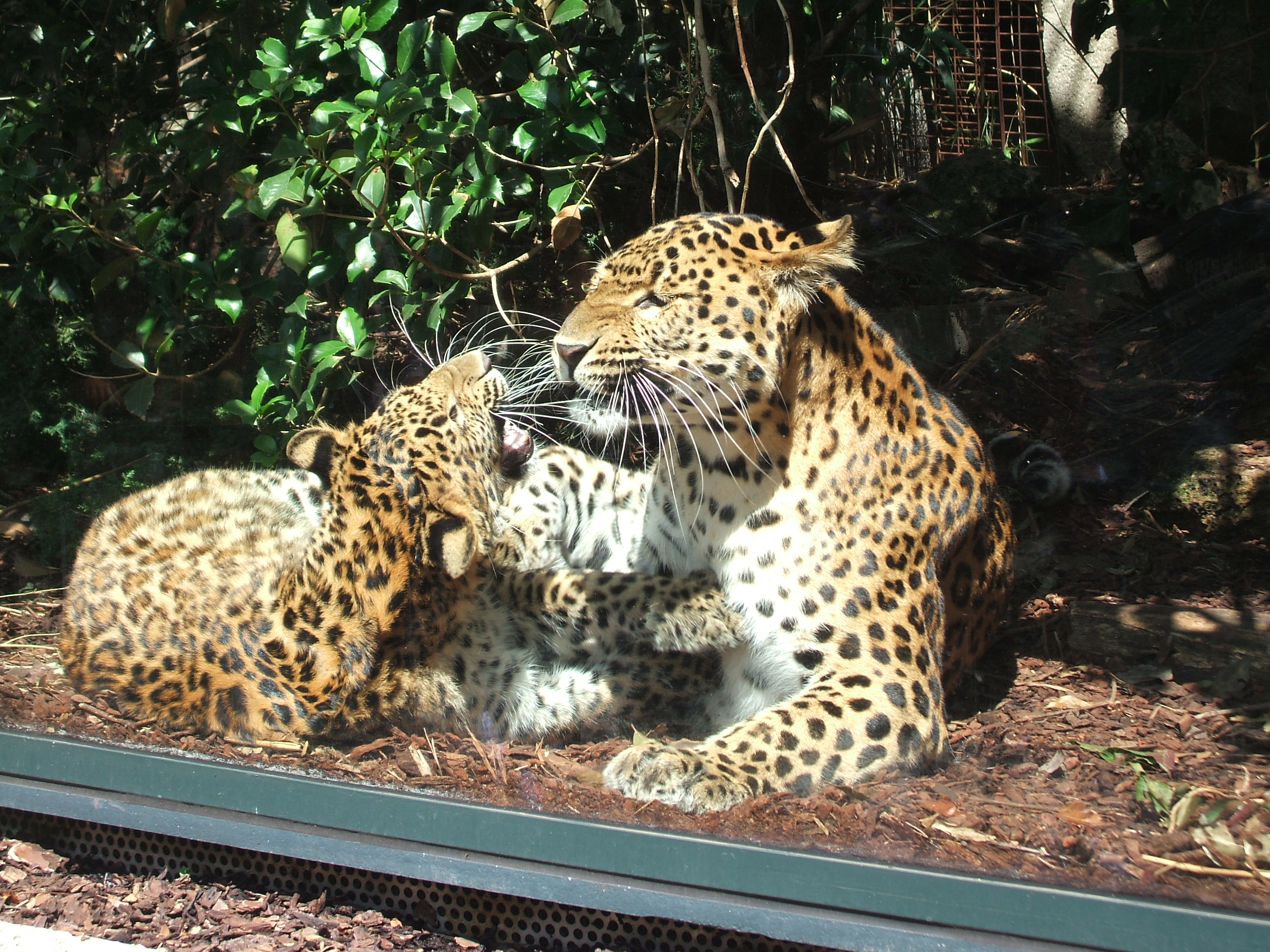
North-Chinese leopards

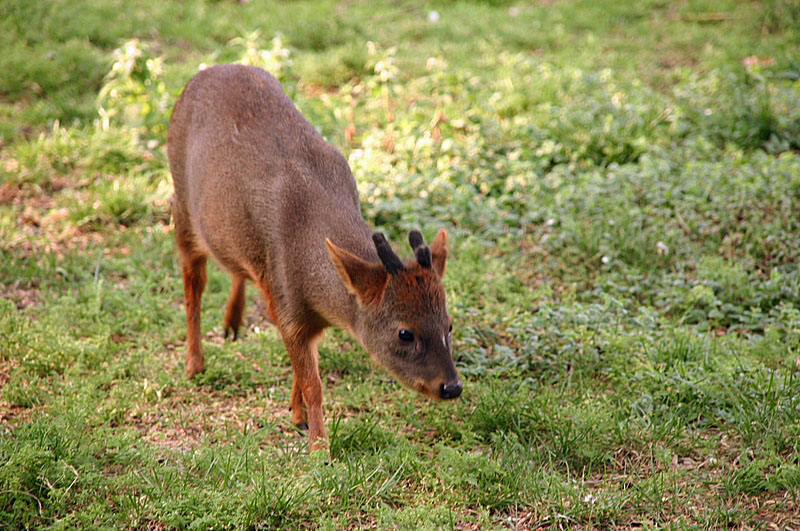
Southern pudu

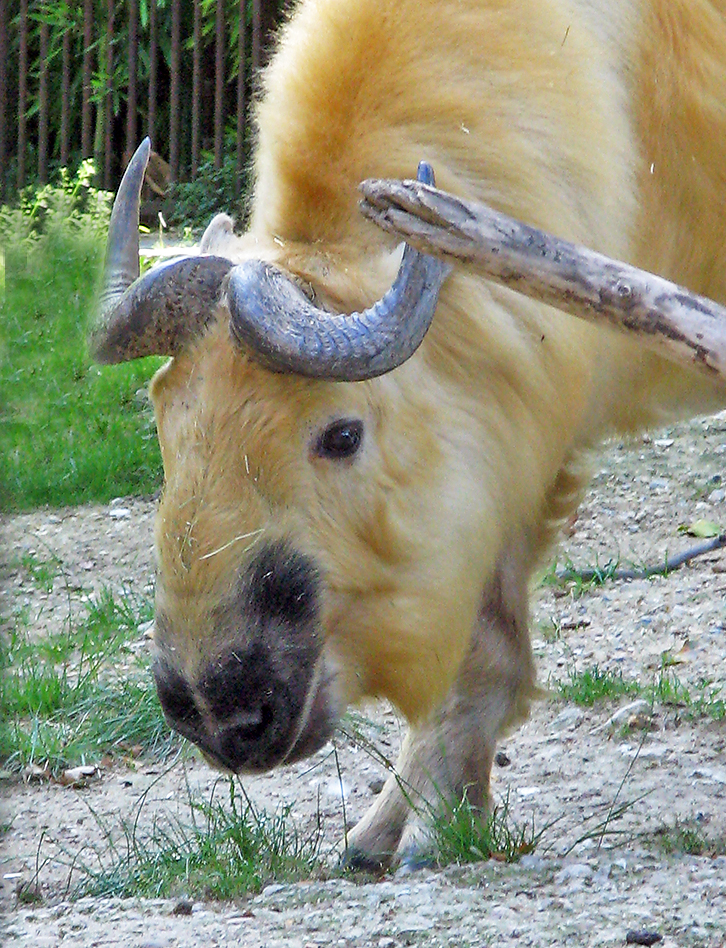
Sichuan takin

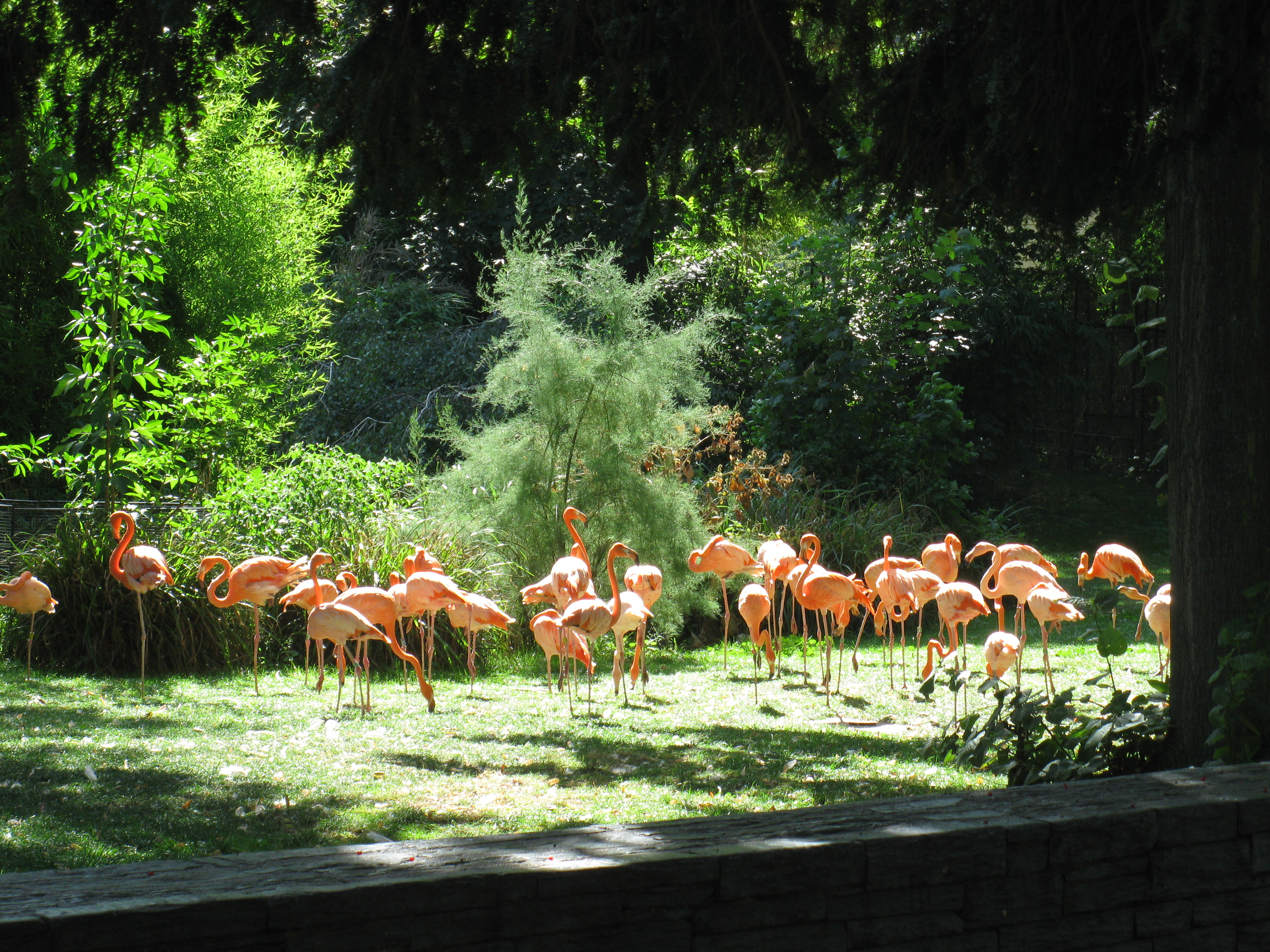
Flamingos

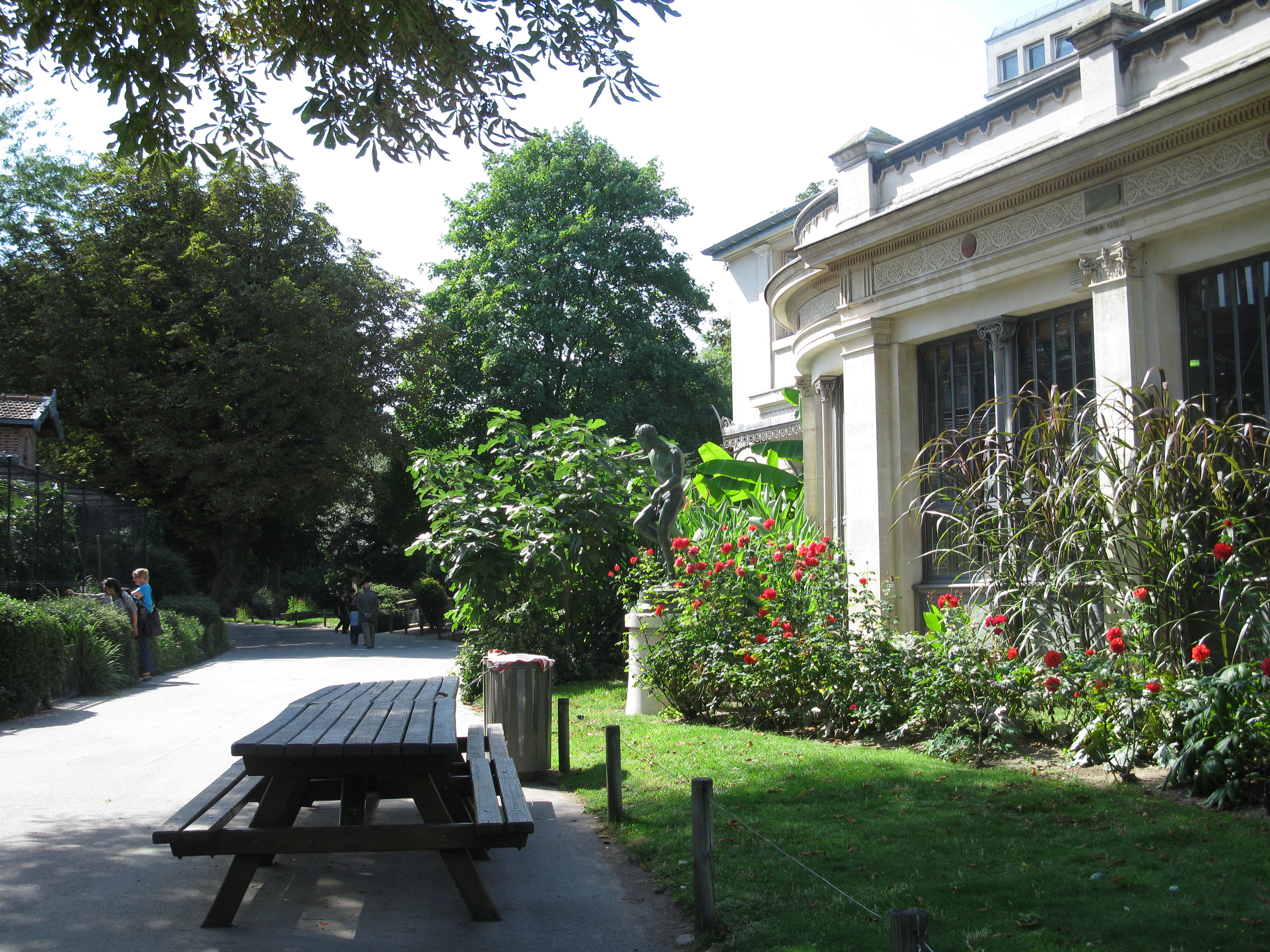
House for reptiles

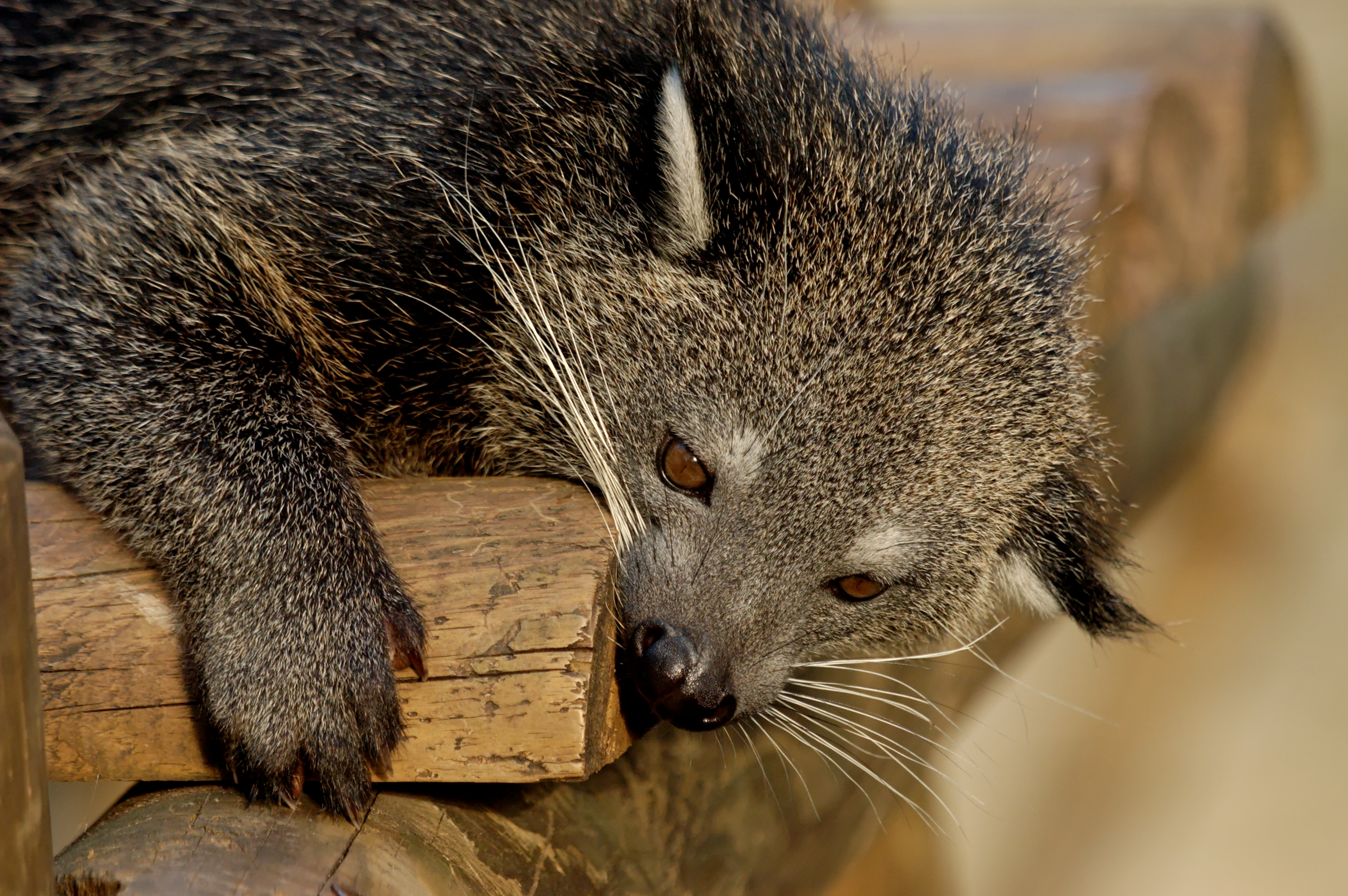
Binturong

== See also ==
- Castor and Pollux – Asian elephants kept at the Paris zoo (d. 1870)
- Zarafa – famous 19th century female Nubian giraffe and 18-year menagerie resident

== Literature ==
- Deligorges, Stephan; Gady, Alexandre; Labalette, Françoise (2004). Le Jardin des plantes et le Muséum national d'histoire naturalle (in French). Éditions du Patrimoine- Centre des Monuments Nationaux. ISBN 978-2-85822-601-6.
- Werner Kourist: 400 Jahre Zoo. Im Spiegel der Sammlung Werner Kourist, Bonn 1976, S. 70-73.
- Annelore Rieke-Müller / Lothar Dittrich: Der Löwe brüllt nebenan. Die Gründung Zoologischer Gärten im deutschsprachigen Raum 1833-1869, Köln / Weimar / Wien 1998. ISBN 3-412-00798-6
- Eric Baratay, Elisabeth Hardouin-Fugier: Zoo. Von der Menagerie zum Tierpark, Berlin 2000. ISBN 3-8031-3604-0
- Lothar Dittrich, Dietrich von Engelhardt & Annelore Rieke-Müller (Hg.): Die Kulturgeschichte des Zoos, Berlin 2001. ISBN 3-86135-482-9
- Wilfrid Blunt: The Ark in the Park – The Zoo in the 19th Century, London 1976.
- Richard W. Burkhardt: La Ménagerie et la vie du Muséum; In: Le Muséum au premier siècle de son histoire, hrsg. v. Claude Blanckaer et al. Paris: Éditions du Muséum national d'histoire naturelle, 1997, S. 481-508.
