= Pollux =

Pollux may refer to:

== People ==
- Julius Pollux, also known as Ioulios Poludeukes (2nd century A.D), a Greek rhetorician
- Pollux (mythology) or Polydeuces, one of the Dioscuri and twin brother of Castor

== Astronomy ==
- Pollux (star), the brightest star in the constellation Gemini, also designated β Geminorum
- Pollux, a crater on the Saturnian moon Epimetheus

== Games ==
- Pollux, a character in the erotic anime series Words Worth
- Pollux (arcade game), an arcade game manufactured by Dooyong in 1991
- Pollux Gamelabs, a Danish game development company.
- Pollux Engine, a game engine used in Final Fantasy Crystal Chronicles: Echoes of Time

== Ships ==
- HNLMS Pollux, a steamship of the Royal Netherlands Navy
- SS Pollux, the name of more than one ship
- USS Pollux, the name of more than one United States Navy ship
- MS Abel Tasman was known as Pollux in 1994-1995
- Pollux (1900), Polish tugboat from the interwar period

== Other uses ==
- Kastor und Pollux, a complex of two towers in Frankfurt am Main, Germany
- Mount Pollux, a mountain in New Zealand
- Pollux, a South Devon Railway 4-4-0ST steam locomotive of the South Devon Railway Eagle class
- Pollux (mite), a genus in the mite family Erythraeidae
- Pollux (mountain), a mountain in the Pennine Alps, in Italy and Switzerland
- Pollux Peak, a mountain in Yellowstone National Park, US
- Pollux Temple, a summit in the Grand Canyon, US
- RTV-N-15 Pollux, an experimental pulsejet-powered research missile of the U.S. Navy
