= Saddle Mountain (Wyoming) =

Mountain in the state of Wyoming

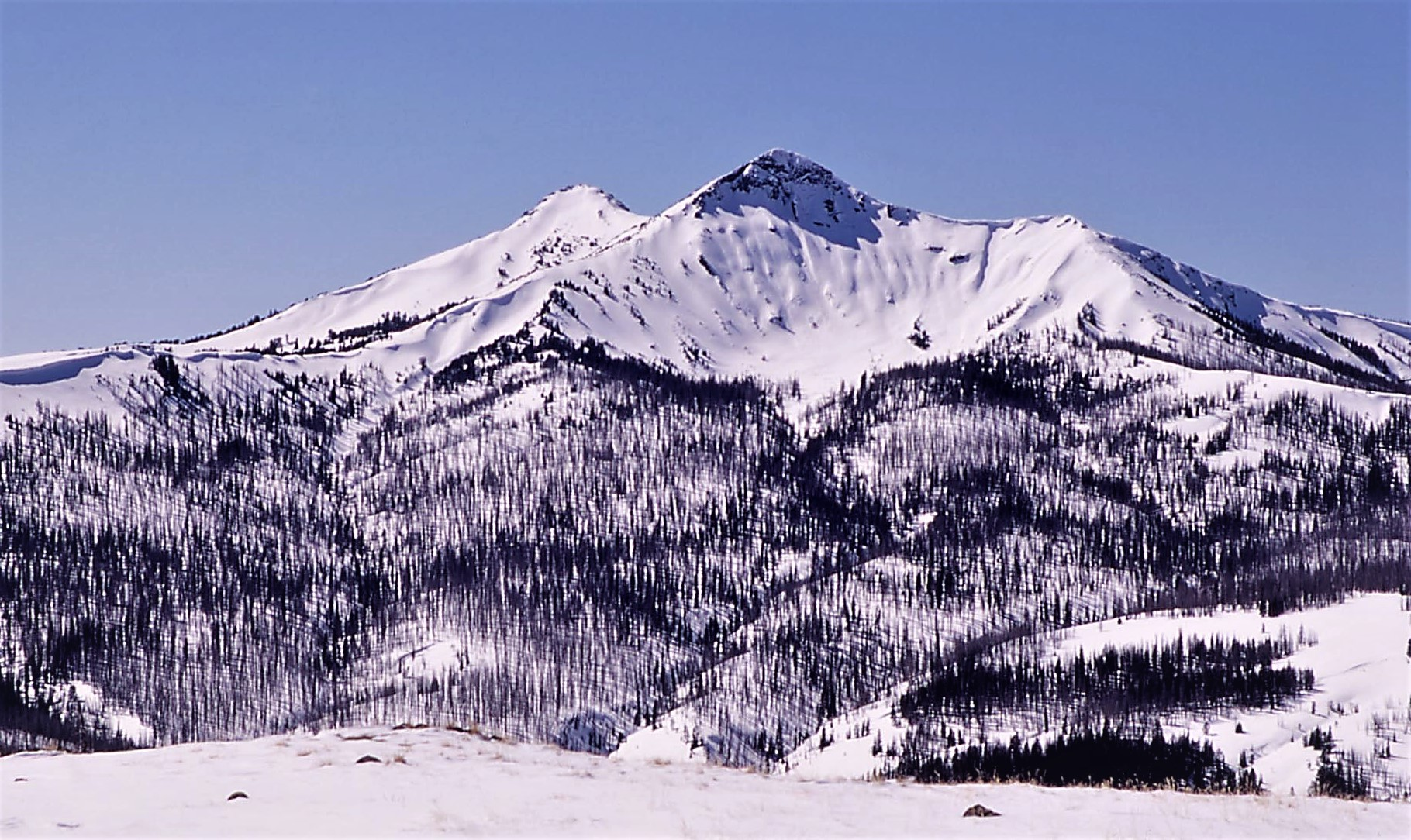
- Northeast aspect in winter

Highest point
- Elevation: 10,670 ft (3,250 m)
- Prominence: 1,870 ft (570 m)
- Parent peak: Castor Peak (10,866 ft)
- Isolation: 3.99 mi (6.42 km)
- Coordinates: 44°42′37″N 109°59′03″W

Geography
- Location within Wyoming Location within the United States
- Location: Yellowstone National Park; Park County, Wyoming, U.S.
- Parent range: Absaroka Range; Rocky Mountains
- Topo map: USGS Pollux Peak

Saddle Mountain is a 10,670-foot-elevation (3,250-meter) mountain summit located in Yellowstone National Park, in Park County, Wyoming, United States.

== Description ==
The peak is situated in the northeast quadrant of Yellowstone National Park and is the 20th-highest peak within the park. It is part of the Absaroka Range, which is a subset of the Rocky Mountains. Neighbors include Little Saddle Mountain 1.5 mile to the southwest, Castor Peak 3.98 miles to the south-southeast, and Pollux Peak 4.07 miles to the southeast on the opposite side of the Lamar River Valley. Topographic relief is significant as the southeast aspect rises 2,900 feet (880 meters) above Lamar River in approximately two miles. The mountain's name, which was officially adopted in 1930 by the United States Board on Geographic Names, was in use before 1899 when Henry Gannett published it in A Dictionary of Altitudes in the United States.

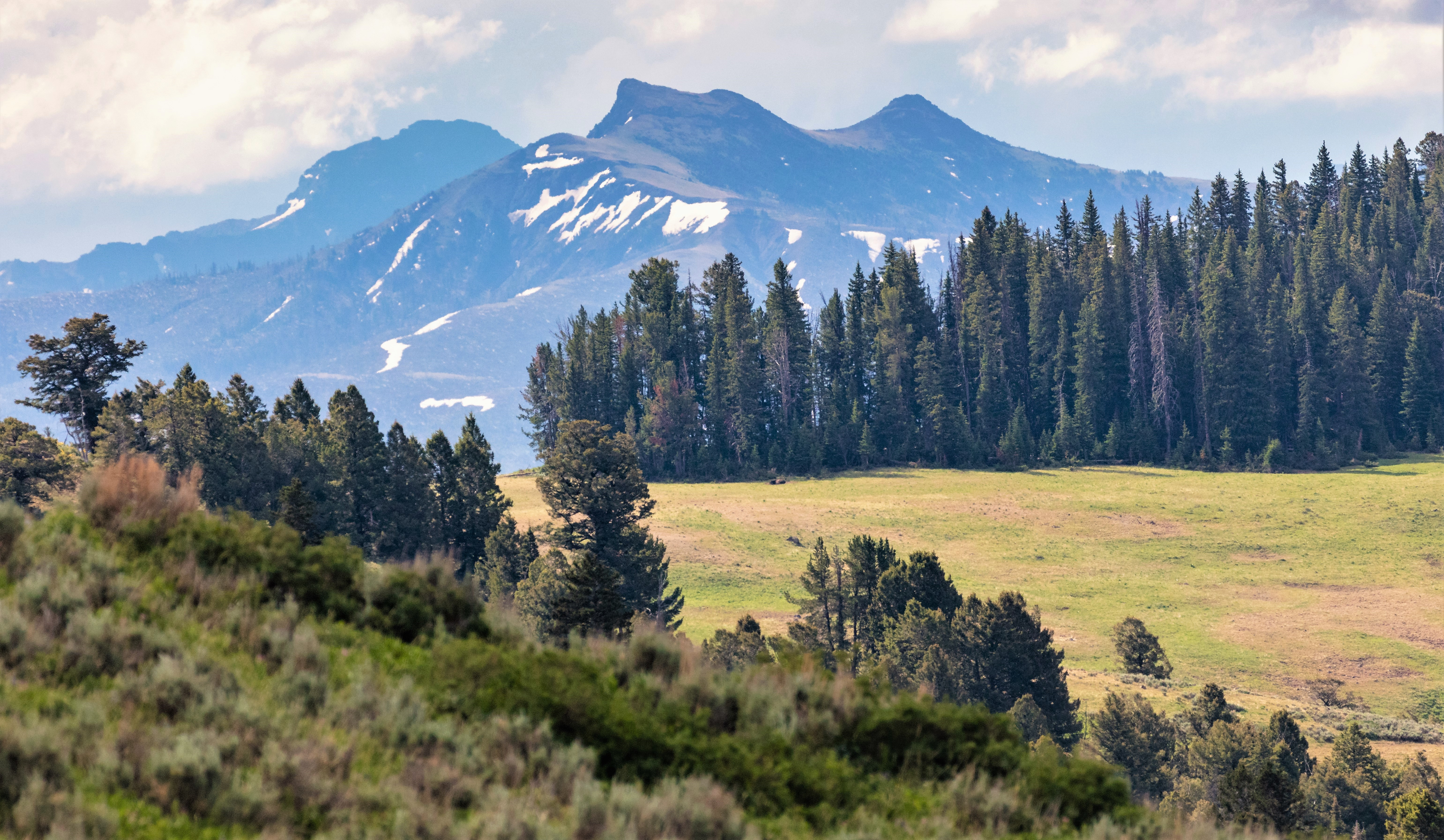
Saddle Mountain from northwest, with Pollux Peak behind

== Climate ==
According to the Köppen climate classification system, Saddle Mountain is located in a subarctic climate zone with long, cold, snowy winters, and cool to warm summers. Winter temperatures can drop below −10 °F with wind chill factors below −30 °F. Precipitation runoff from the mountain drains into tributaries of the Lamar River.

== See also ==
- List of mountains and mountain ranges of Yellowstone National Park

Sunset in Lamar Valley featuring Saddle Mountain (left), Hague Mountain, and Little Saddle Mountain
