= USS Pollux =

USS Pollux or USNS Pollux has been the name of more than one United States Navy ship, and may refer to:

- USS Pollux (SP-2573), a cargo ship in commission from 3 to 24 April 1918
- USS Pollux (AKS-2), a general stores issue ship commissioned in 1941 and wrecked in 1942
- USS Pollux (AKS-4), a general stores issue ship in commission from April 1942 to April 1950 and from August 1950 to December 1968
- USNS Pollux (T-AKR-290), ex-T-AK-290, a vehicle cargo ship in non-commissioned service from 1981 to 2007
