= Castor and Pollux (elephants) =

Asian elephants kept at the Paris zoo (d. 1870)

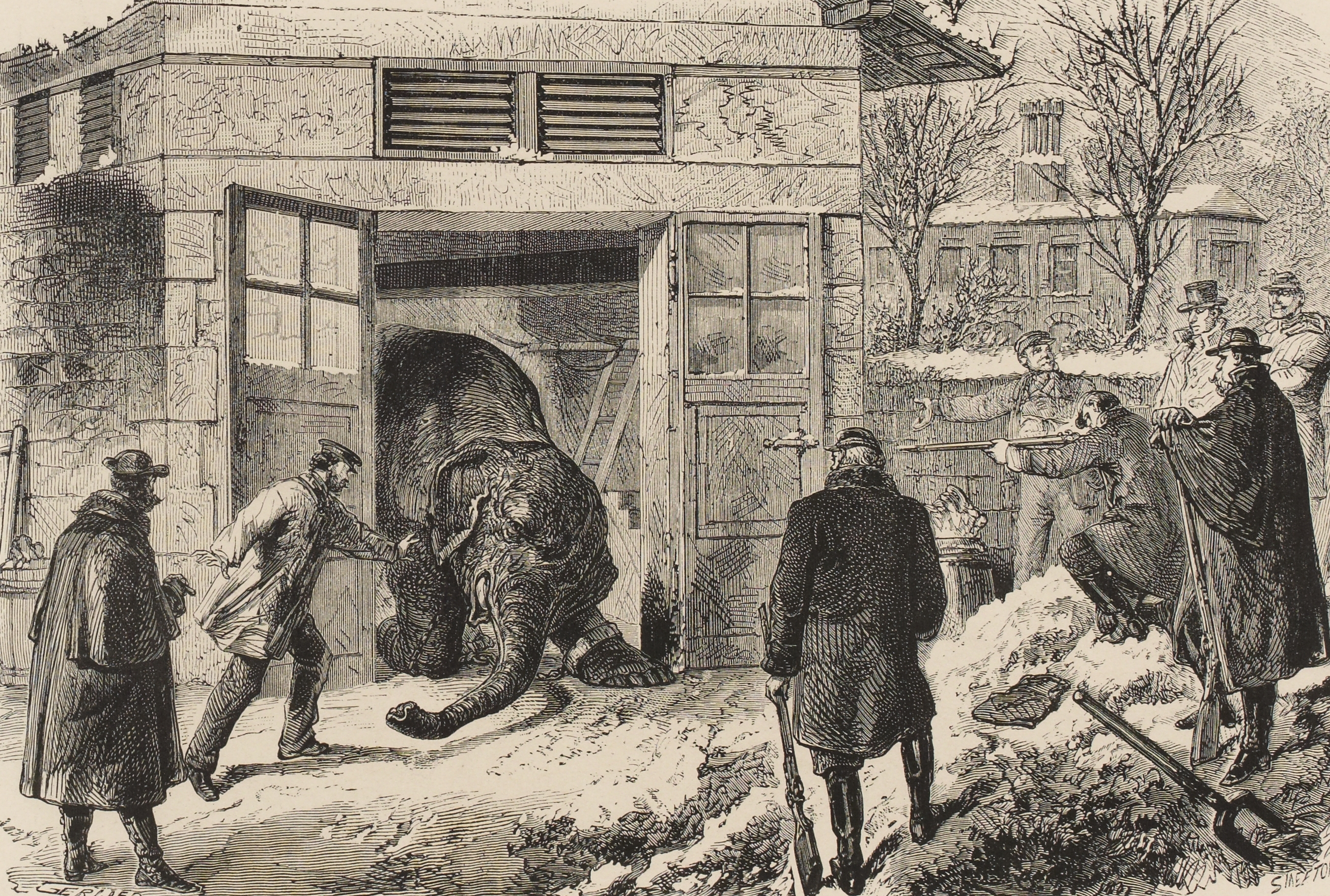
One of the elephants is shot for its meat in December 1870.

Castor and Pollux were two elephants kept at the zoo Ménagerie du Jardin des plantes in Paris. They were killed and eaten, along with many other animals from the zoo, in late 1870 during the Siege of Paris. The two elephants may have been siblings, and were named after the twin brothers of Greek and Roman mythology. They had been popular before the siege for giving rides on their backs around the park, but the food shortages caused by the German blockade of the city eventually drove the citizens of Paris to kill them for their meat.

== History ==
On 19 September 1870, Prussian forces encircled Paris. Rather than bombarding the city into surrender the German high command decided to blockade the city to force a quick surrender. The Parisians managed to hold out until 28 January 1871 (when they surrendered after three days of shelling ordered by Otto von Bismarck who had become tired of the ineffective tactics of the high command). During the siege food became scarce and the populace were forced to turn to unusual sources for their meat.

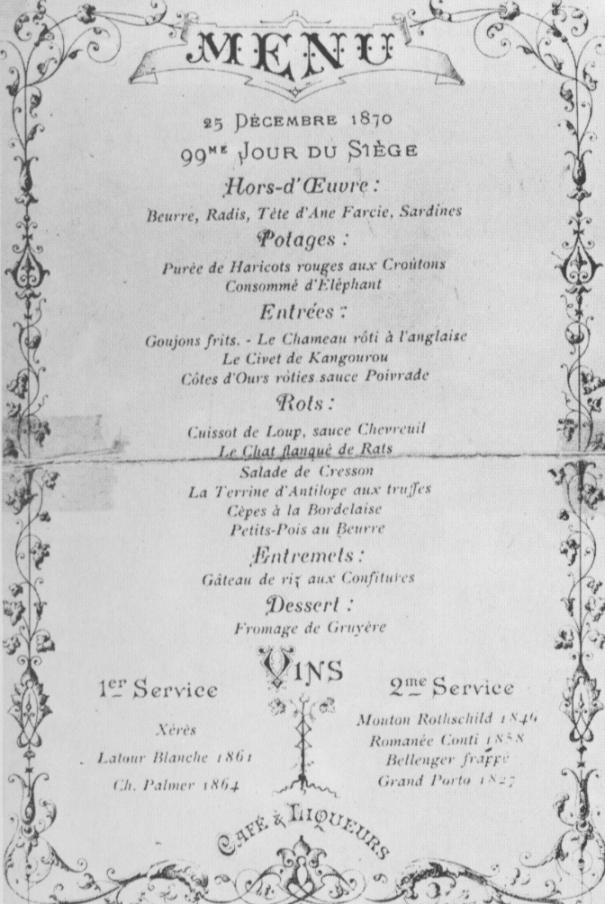
The Christmas Day menu from a Parisian restaurant featured fine wines and dishes of exotic animals.

When vegetables, butter, milk, cheese and the regularly consumed meats began to run out, the Parisians turned first on the horses, donkeys and mules. Horse meat had been introduced by the butchers of Paris four years earlier as a cheap alternative source of meat for the poor, but under siege conditions it quickly became a luxury item. Though there were large numbers of horses in Paris (estimates suggested between 65,000 and 70,000 were butchered and eaten during the siege) the supplies were ultimately limited. Champion racehorses were not spared (even two horses presented to Napoleon III by Alexander II of Russia were slaughtered) but the meat soon became scarce. Cats, dogs, mice and rats were the next selection for the menu. There was no control over rationing until late in the siege, so while the poor struggled, the wealthy Parisians ate comparatively well; the Jockey Club offered a fine selection of gourmet dishes of the unusual meats including Salmis de rats à la Robert. There were considerably fewer cats and dogs in the city than there had been horses, and the unpalatable mice and rats were difficult to prepare, so, by the end of 1870, the butchers turned their attention to the animals of the zoos. The medium and large sized herbivores, such as the antelope, camels, deer, kangaroo, yaks and zebra were first to be killed. Some animals survived: the monkeys were thought to be too akin to humans to be killed, the lions and tigers were too dangerous, and the hippopotamus of the Jardin des Plantes also escaped because the price of 80,000 francs demanded for it was beyond the reach of any of the butchers. Menus began to offer exotic dishes such as Tête d'Ane Farcie (Stuffed Donkey's Head), Côtes d'Ours (Bear Ribs), Chat flanqué des Rats (Cat with Rats), Cuissot de Loup, Sauce Chevreuil (Haunch of Wolf with a Deer Sauce), Terrine d'Antilope aux truffes (Terrine of Antelope with truffles), Civet de Kangourou (Kangaroo Stew) and Chameau rôti à l'anglaise (Camel roasted à l'anglaise)

The demise of the elephants was recorded in the Lettre-Journal de Paris (commonly known as the Gazette des Absents), a twice-weekly periodical published during the siege by Damase Jouaust and delivered, along with the mail, by balloon to avoid the encircling Prussian forces. The Gazette des Absents reported that Castor had been killed on 29 December 1870 and Pollux the following day, both by explosive steel-tipped bullets fired from a range of 10 metres (33 ft) by M. Devisme. However, a menu from 25 December was already offering Consommé d'Eléphant so it is likely that the dates are wrong. The elephants were bought by M. Deboos of the Boucherie Anglaise in Boulevard Hausmann for 27,000 francs for the pair. M.Deboos did well out of the purchase: the trunks sold as a delicacy for 40 or 45 francs a pound, the other parts for about 10 to 14 francs a pound.

By all accounts, elephant was not tasty. Thomas Gibson Bowles, who was in Paris during the siege, wrote that he had eaten camel, antelope, dog, donkey, mule and elephant and of those he liked elephant the least. Henry Labouchère recorded:

Yesterday, I had a slice of Pollux for dinner. Pollux and his brother Castor are two elephants, which have been killed. It was tough, coarse, and oily, and I do not recommend English families to eat elephant as long as they can get beef or mutton.

== See also ==
- List of individual elephants
- Elephant meat

== Sources / Further reading ==
- Burton, Richard D.E. (2001). Blood in the City: Violence and Revelation in Paris, 1789-1945. Cornell University Press. p. 416. ISBN 0-8014-3868-3.
- Hoffman, Wickham (1877). Camp, Court and Siege. Harper & Brothers. pp. 285.
- Horne, Alistair (2004). The Terrible Year: The Paris Commune, 1871. Weidenfeld & Nicolson history. pp. 208. ISBN 1-84212-759-4.
- Labouchère, Henry (2006) [1871]. Diary of the Besieged Resident in Paris. Project Gutenberg.
- "La Gazette des Absents : abattage d'un éléphant du Jardin des plantes durant le siège de Paris" (in French). www.philatelistes.net. 1870.
- "Journaux-lettres du Siège de Paris" (in French). www.philatelistes.net. 2000.
- "Les lettres ballons montés de Caroline" (in French). Archives François de la Jousselinière. 2003.
- "Castor and Pollux and the Siege of Paris (poem)".
