= USS Pollux (SP-2573) =

Cargo ship of the United States Navy

History

United States
- Name: USS Pollux
- Namesake: Previous name retained
- Builder: Werf voorheen Rijkee N. V., Rotterdam, the Netherlands
- Yard number: 132
- Completed: 1909
- Acquired: 20 March 1918
- Commissioned: 3 April 1918
- Decommissioned: 24 April 1918
- Fate: Transferred to United States Shipping Board 24 April 1918. Sunk as block ship in Scapa Flow 23 March 1941.
- Notes: In commercial service 1909-1918, United States Shipping Board Service 1918-1919, and commercial service from 1919 as Pollux

General characteristics
- Type: Cargo ship
- Tonnage: 3,940 deadweight tons
- Length: 326 ft 9 in (99.59 m) between perpendiculars
- Beam: 44 ft 1 in (13.44 m)
- Draft: 18 ft (5.5 m)
- Speed: 9 knots
- Complement: 70

The first USS Pollux (SP-2573) was a United States Navy cargo ship in commission for three weeks during April 1918.

SS Pollux was built in 1909 at Rotterdam, the Netherlands, by Werf voorheen Rijkee N. V. as a commercial cargo ship for KNSM The Royal Netherlands Steamship Company or De Konninklijke Nederlandsche Stoomboot-Maatschappij, a major Dutch shipping company at the time. SS Pollux was one of six very similar ships built for KNSM with SS Clio (USS Clio - ID-2578) built by Rijkee at Rotterdam in 1910, SS Saturnus built by Mij Fijenoord in Rotterdam in 1909 along with SS Mercurius (USS Mercurius - ID 2516), SS Minerva, and SS Stella built by William Hamilton & Co. Ltd. in Glasgow Scotland in 1909.

During World War I, which began in 1914 and ended in 1918, the Netherlands was a neutral power. This meant that Dutch ships could not be used to support either side in the conflict. When the United States entered the war on 6 April 1917, the pressure increased on the Netherlands to allow their ships to be used, but they were not in a position to do this without risking German retaliation. Finally, on 20 and 21 March 1918, the U.S. and the British simply seized all the Dutch ships in their ports and justified it with the legal concept of the 'right of angary'. A total of 135 Dutch ships were seized including Pollux and two of her sister ships: Clio and Mercurius.

The U.S. Navy acquired Pollux for World War I service from her owners, Koninklijke Nederlandsche Stoomboot-Maatschappij of Amsterdam, the Netherlands, on 20 March 1918 and commissioned her at Key West on 3 April 1918 as USS Pollux (SP-2573).

Manned by a skeleton crew of available sailors, Pollux departed Key West on 6 April 1918 for Cuba, where she took on board sugar at Havana, Cárdenas, and Matanzas. She arrived at New Orleans, Louisiana, on 22 April 1918 with 25,000 bags of sugar for the American Sugar Refinery Company, then began preparations for inactivation.

The Navy decommissioned Pollux and turned her over to the United States Shipping Board on 24 April 1918 for further use during World War I. She was returned to her owners in 1919.

In 1931 Pollux was renamed Tabarka. On 23 March 1941 Tabarka was sunk as a blockship in Kirk Sound, Scapa Flow. refloated 27 July 1944 and resunk in Burra Sound.
