= Pollux Peak =

Mountain in the state of Wyoming

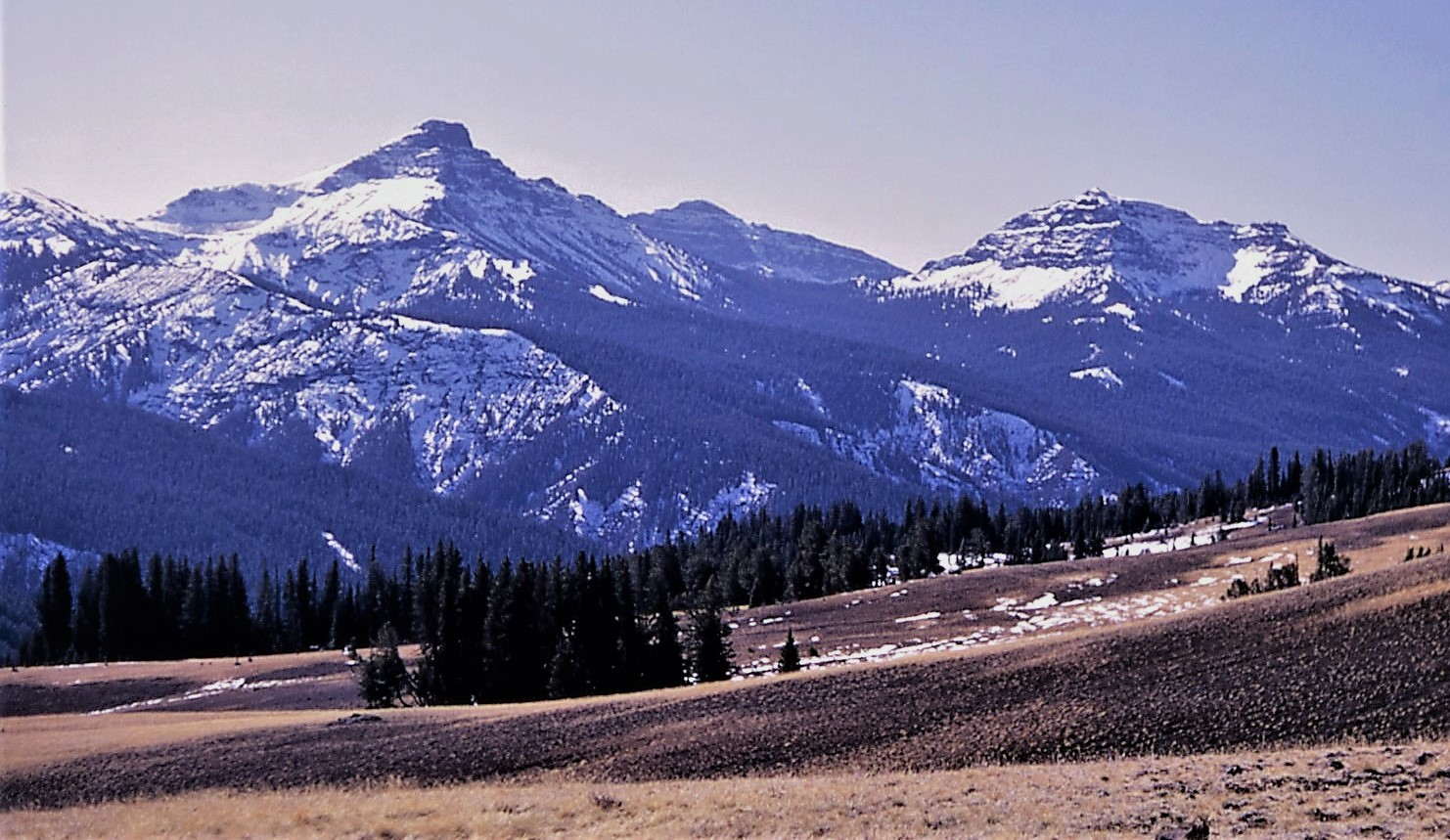
- Northwest aspect of Pollux (left) and Castor (right)

Highest point
- Elevation: 11,063 ft (3,372 m)
- Prominence: 1,223 ft (373 m)
- Parent peak: Land Mountain (11,270 ft)
- Isolation: 4.76 mi (7.66 km)
- Coordinates: 44°39′58″N 109°55′45″W

Naming
- Etymology: Pollux

Geography
- Location within Wyoming Location within the United States
- Location: Yellowstone National Park; Park County, Wyoming, U.S.
- Parent range: Absaroka Range; Rocky Mountains
- Topo map: USGS Pollux Peak

Climbing
- Easiest route: class 3 scrambling

Pollux Peak is an 11,063-foot-elevation (3,372-meter) mountain summit located in Yellowstone National Park, in Park County, Wyoming, United States.

== Description ==
The peak is situated in the northeast quadrant of Yellowstone National Park and is the fourth-highest peak within the park. It is part of the Absaroka Range, which is a subset of the Rocky Mountains. Neighbors include Castor Peak 1.4 miles (2.3 km) to the southwest, and Saddle Mountain 4.1 miles (6.6 km) to the northwest on the opposite side of the Lamar River Valley. Topographic relief is significant as the northwest aspect rises over 3,300 feet (1,000 meters) above Lamar River in approximately 1.5 mile. Pollux Peak is named for Pollux, the twin half-brother of Castor according to Greek mythology, and these two gods were considered protectors of travelers, of which there are many in Yellowstone Park. The mountain's name, which was officially adopted in 1930 by the United States Board on Geographic Names, was in use before 1899 when Henry Gannett published it in A Dictionary of Altitudes in the United States.

== Climate ==
According to the Köppen climate classification system, Pollux Peak is located in a subarctic climate zone with long, cold, snowy winters, and cool to warm summers. Winter temperatures can drop below −10 °F with wind chill factors below −30 °F. Precipitation runoff from the mountain drains into tributaries of the Lamar River.

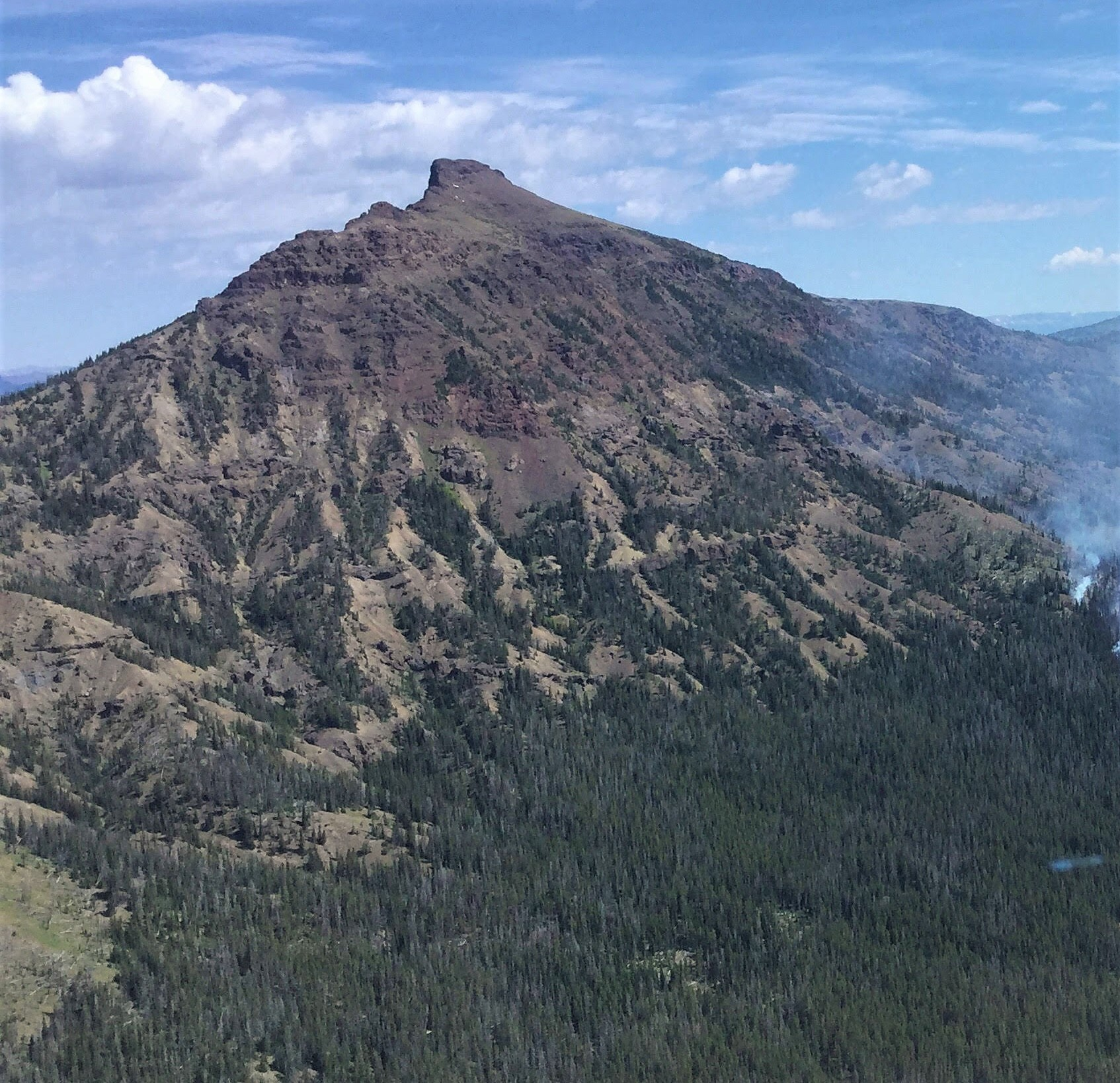
Aerial view of Pollux Peak, south-southwest aspect

== See also ==
- List of mountains and mountain ranges of Yellowstone National Park
