= David E. Folsom =

Yellowstone National Park expedition leader (1839-1918)

David Edwin Folsom (1839-1918) was a politically active historical figure in the U.S. state of Montana, and notably, the leader of the 1869 expedition of Yellowstone National Park and namesake of Folsom Peak.

== Early life and career ==
David E. Folsom was born in May 1839, in Epping, New Hampshire. He attended school at Vassalboro, Maine, and then transferred to the Moses Brown Quaker School in Providence, Rhode Island, both with Charles W. Cook. Cook was a childhood friend at the time, but would later be involved in more of Folsom's endeavors.

While receiving training as an engineer at this latter school, Folsom's health deteriorated until his career path was drastically changed by moving west as advised by his physician.

Initially, Folsom travelled to Montana for the purpose of gold mining. However, he later changed career paths again to work on a ranch in Willow Creek, Montana, owned by Henry C. Harrison. The job that most directly led Folsom into his most infamous expedition was his work at Confederate Gulch's ditch company, where he reunited with Charles W. Cook in the winter before their 1869 Yellowstone expedition.

== 1869 Yellowstone National Park Expedition ==
Folsom led an expedition of the land that would become Yellowstone National Park beginning on September 6, 1869, with Charles W. Cook and William Peterson. The expedition started from Diamond City and included the following routes in chronological order: Trail Creek, Yellowstone River, Tower Falls, Lamar Valley, Grand Canyon, and more. Their exploration returned them to Diamond City on October 11, 1869.

Prior to the expedition, more people intended to participate. However, an expected military escort failed to attend, leaving many concerned with rumored hostile Native Americans. As a result, only Charles W. Cook and William Peterson were interested in following through with the exploration with Folsom by September 6.

After this expedition, ideas of turning this land into a park resulted. These thoughts were planned to be included in a July, 1870 publication of the magazine, Western Monthly, but these parts were omitted by the editors who intended to only show what physical features of the park were explored and described. This would be the second reported mentioning of the need to reserve this land as a public park. The first of which was written by Cornelius Hedges.

This expedition was highly influential to many other scholars and explorers of Montana. For example, research on the expedition by botanist Victor K. Chestnut culminated in the creation of a typed manuscript of the expedition diary in 1904, which was later corrected by Folsom.

== Later life ==
Around 1873–1875, Folsom returned to New Hampshire, married his wife, Lucy Jones, in 1880, and moved back to Montana to manage a ranch with her near Smith River. Once in Montana, Folsom began a political career, becoming Meagher County's treasurer between 1885 and 1890, a state senator, and a Montana Capitol Commission member. In 1900, Folsom ran for governor of Montana, but was beaten by Joseph K. Toole. Three years later, Folsom moved with his family to California and remained there until he died on May 18, 1918, in Palo Alto, California.
