= Cook Peak =

Mountain in Wyoming, United States

- Location within Wyoming

Highest point
- Elevation: 9,754 ft (2,973 m)
- Coordinates: 44°50′34″N 110°34′31″W

Geography
- Location: Yellowstone National Park, Park County, Wyoming
- Parent range: Washburn Range
- Topo map: Cook Peak

Cook Peak, elevation 9,754 feet (2,973 m), is a mountain peak in the Washburn Range of Yellowstone National Park. The peak was named in 1922 by then-superintendent Horace Albright to honor Charles W. Cook, a member of the 1869 Cook–Folsom–Peterson Expedition which explored the Yellowstone park region; 1922 was the 50th anniversary of the park's creation, and Cook, still living in Montana, attended ceremonies in the park. Prior to 1922, the peak had been named Thompson Peak by Philetus Norris in 1880 and Storm Peak by members of the Arnold Hague Geological Surveys in 1885.

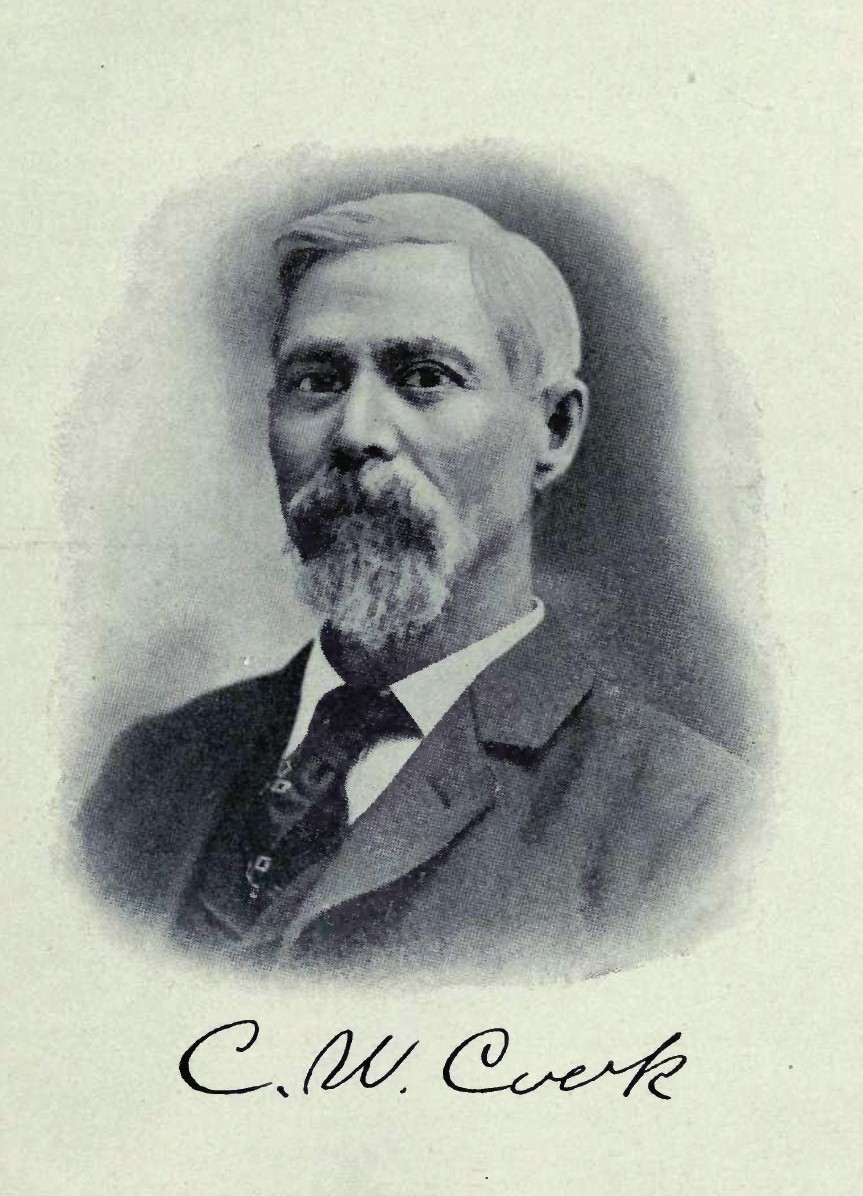
Cook Peak namesake, Charles W. Cook

== See also ==
- Mountains and mountain ranges of Yellowstone National Park
