= Major expeditions to the Yellowstone region =

This list summarizes the major expeditions to the Yellowstone region that led to the creation of the park and contributed to the protection of the park and its resources between 1869 and 1890.

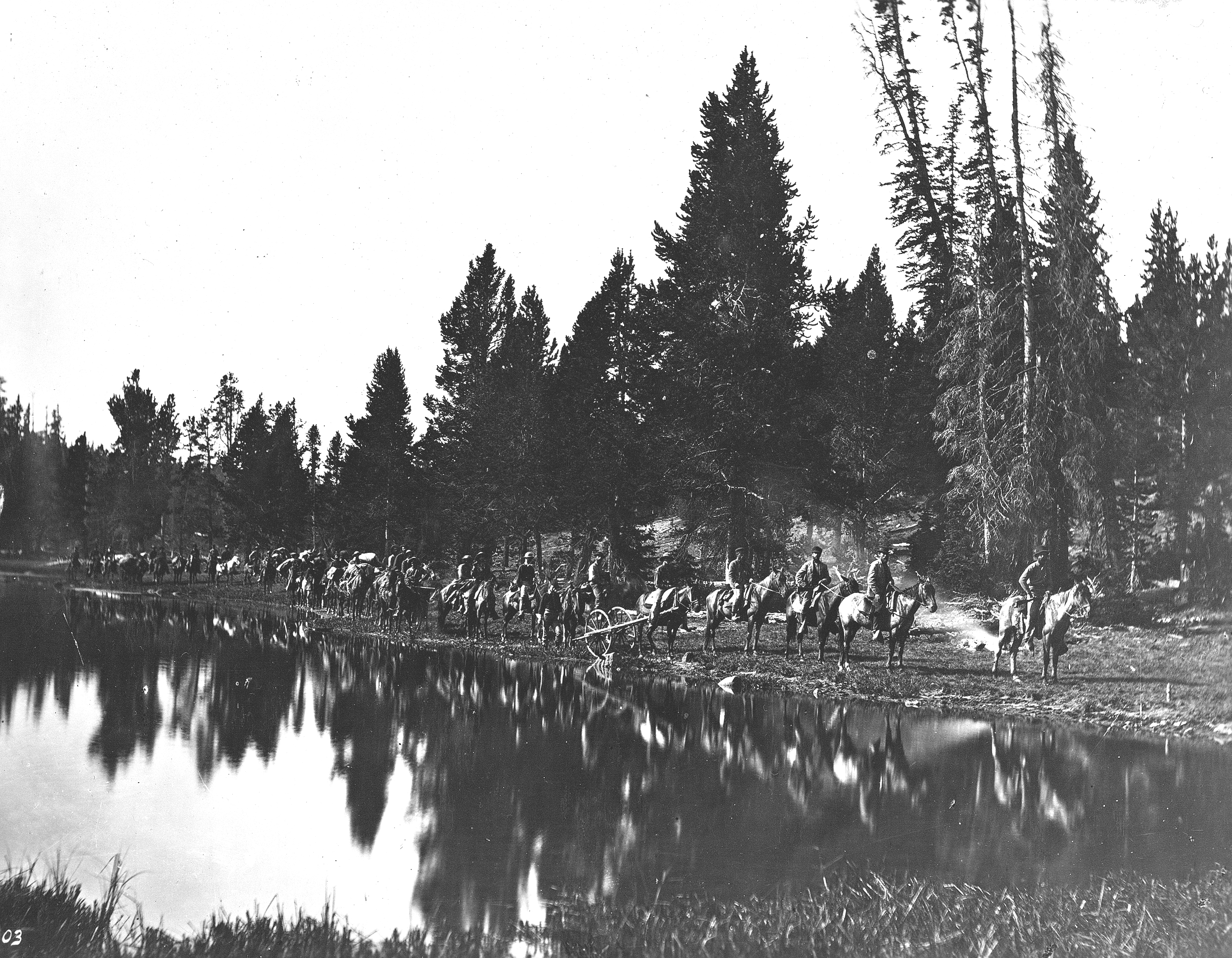
1871 Hayden Survey at Mirror Lake en route to East Fork of the Yellowstone River, August 24, 1871-William H. Jackson photo

When President Ulysses S. Grant created Yellowstone National Park with the signing of the Act of Dedication, March 1, 1872, it was the result of three major expeditions into the region, expeditions that brought the wonders of Yellowstone into public view. Prior to 1869, the Yellowstone region—its rivers, waterfalls, lakes, mountains, valleys and geothermal features were essentially part of an unknown and unexplored territory. Even after the creation of the park, the region remained largely unexplored and its resources unprotected for over a decade until the U.S. Army assumed management of the park in 1886. Even after the U.S. Army took control, legal protection of the park's resources was limited. From 1869 until 1890, a number of notable expeditions contributed not only to the creation of the park, but to a broader public, social and scientific understanding of the park, its resources and wonders. This understanding ultimately led Congress and the Federal Government to adopt much stronger laws to protect the park and its resources culminating in the Lacey Act of 1894.

== Pre-creation Expeditions (1869-1871) ==
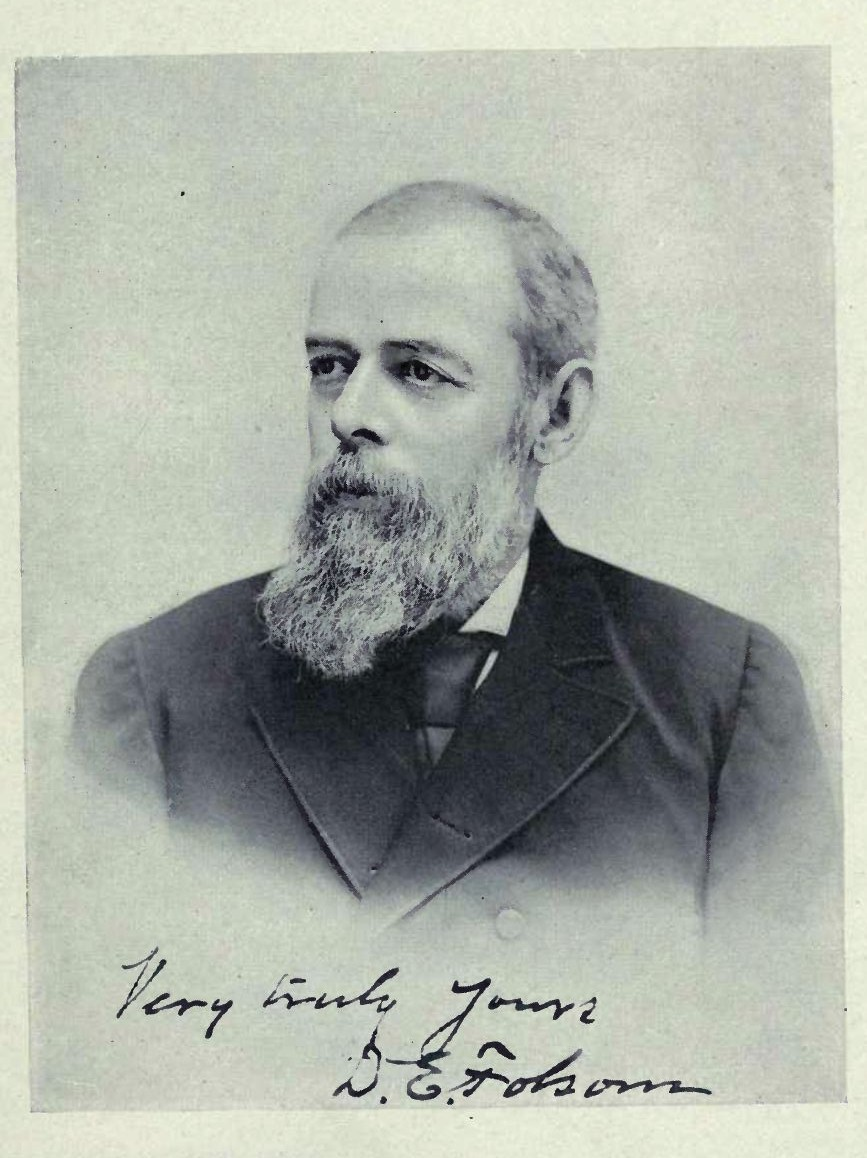
David E. Folsom

=== Cook–Folsom–Peterson Expedition of 1869 ===
The Cook–Folsom–Peterson Expedition of 1869 was the first organized expedition to explore the region that became Yellowstone National Park. The privately financed expedition was carried out by David E. Folsom, Charles W. Cook and William Peterson of Diamond City, Montana, a gold camp in the Confederate Gulch area of the Big Belt Mountains east of Helena, Montana. The journals kept by Cook and Folsom, as well as their personal accounts to friends were of significant inspirational value to spur the organization of the Washburn-Langford-Doane Expedition which visited Yellowstone in 1870.

East Coast newspaper and magazine editors viewed the Cook-Folsom-Peterson Expedition skeptically, and the initial description was published only in a minor periodical called the Western Monthly Magazine. Folsom was a poor public speaker, but privately convinced Nathaniel P. Langford that he should quickly organize an expedition of his own to claim "discovery" rights for Yellowstone.

=== Washburn–Langford–Doane Expedition of 1870 ===
The Washburn–Langford–Doane Expedition of 1870, explored the region of northwestern Wyoming that a couple years later became Yellowstone National Park in 1872. Led by Henry Washburn, Nathaniel P. Langford and under U.S. Army escort led by Lt. Gustavus C. Doane, the expedition followed the general course of the Cook–Folsom–Peterson Expedition made the previous year.

During their explorations, members of the party made detailed maps and observations of the Yellowstone region, exploring numerous lakes, climbing several mountains and observing wildlife. The expedition visited both the Upper and Lower Geyser Basins, and after observing the regularity of eruptions of one geyser, decided to name it Old Faithful, since it would erupt about once every hour.

The first widely publicized accounts of the region resulted from this expedition and occurred when Langford lectured about the expedition in the East during the Winter and Spring of 1871 and published his Wonders of the Yellowstone in Scribners in May 1871 and Lt. Doane circulated his official report throughout the Department of War.

On January 19, 1871, Langford presented the results of his expedition in a private lecture at the Lincoln Hall in Washington, D.C. Among the attendees was Ferdinand Vandeveer Hayden, who had long been curious about the Yellowstone region. On March 3, Hayden secured federal funds for an expedition of his own.

=== Hayden Geological Survey of 1871 ===
The Hayden Geological Survey of 1871 explored the region of northwestern Wyoming that became Yellowstone National Park in 1872. It was led by geologist Ferdinand Vandeveer Hayden. In the spring of 1871, Hayden selected the members of the survey team, 32 in all from among friends and colleagues, seven previous survey participants and a few political patrons. Included in the party was William Henry Jackson, his photographer from his 1870 survey and Thomas Moran, a guest artist arranged by Jay Cooke. The 1871 survey was not Hayden's first, but it was the first federally funded, geological survey to explore and further document features in the region soon to become Yellowstone National Park and played a prominent role in convincing the U.S. Congress to pass the legislation creating the park. In 1894, Nathaniel P. Langford, the first park superintendent and a member of the Washburn-Langford-Doane Expedition which explored the park in 1870, wrote this about the Hayden expedition:

We trace the creation of the park from the Folsom-Cook expedition of 1869 to the Washburn expedition of 1870, and thence to the Hayden expedition (U. S. Geological Survey) of 1871, Not to one of these expeditions more than to another do we owe the legislation which set apart this "pleasuring-ground for the benefit and enjoyment of the people

— Nathaniel P. Langford, 1894

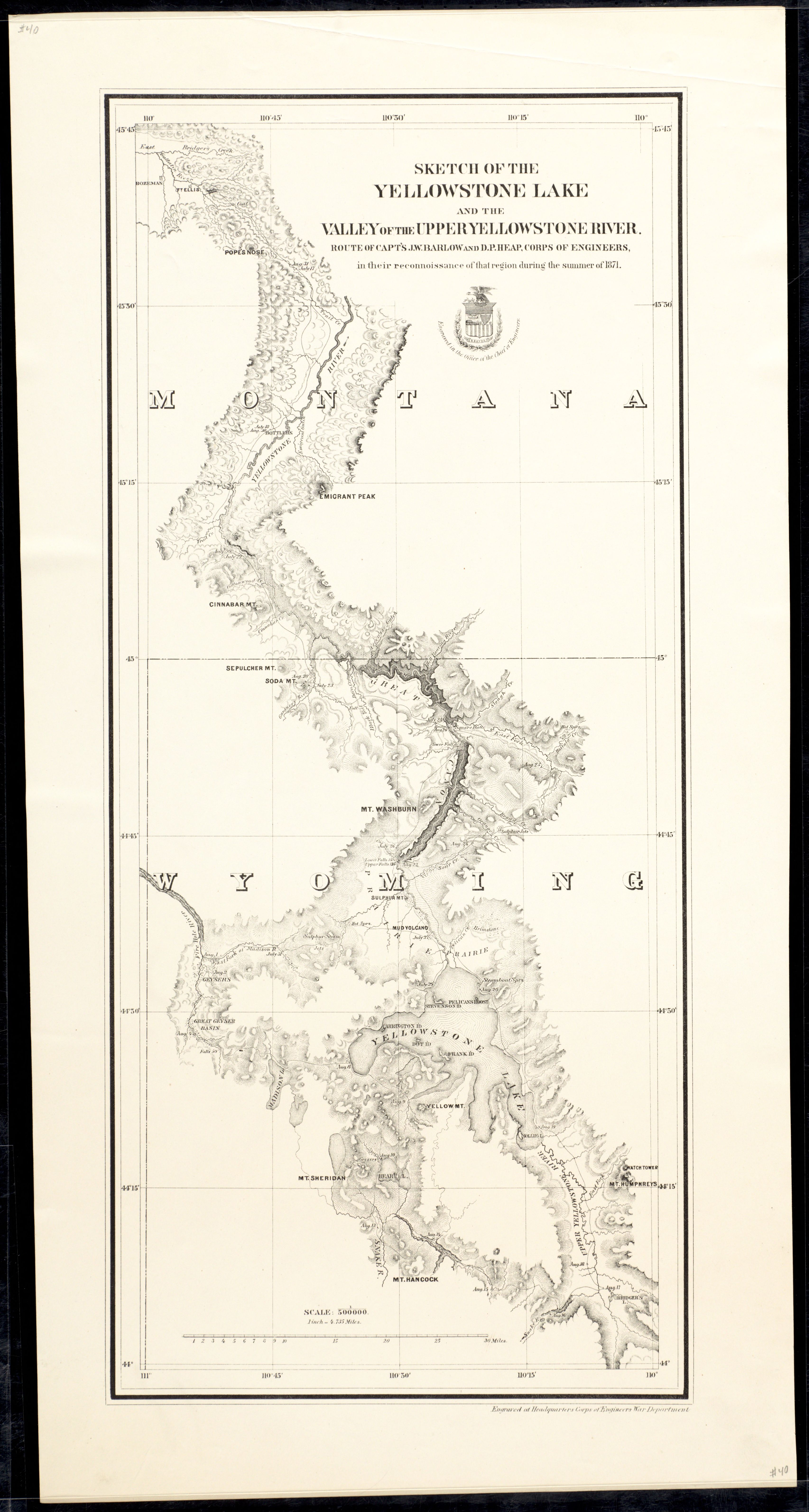
David Heap's map of the Upper Yellowstone

=== Heap-Barlow Expedition of 1871 ===
Hayden's expedition was accompanied by John W. Barlow and David Porter Heap of the United States Army Corps of Engineers. Hayden considered his expedition separate from Barlow and Heap's topographical and geological work, and the two groups worked independently. Barlow returned to Chicago in late September 1871, only to have the Great Chicago Fire destroy all of his photographs and specimens on October 8-9. The main surviving records of the expedition were Barlow's journal, which he had fortunately left in his home, and Heap's maps of the region, which he had preserved separately.

Barlow's report, based on his journal, was published in 1872. It was intended only for a small audience of Army officials, who had an interest in Yellowstone geography due to the Indian Wars, and was not widely distributed.

== Post-creation Expeditions (1872-1890) ==
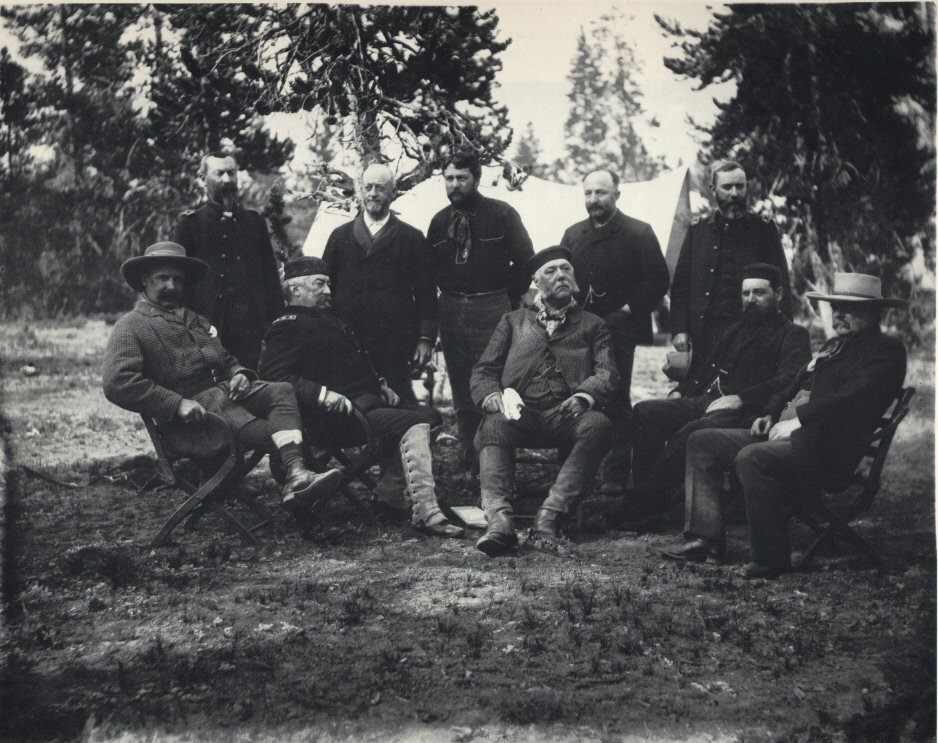
President Chester A. Arthur and party at Old Faithful, 1883

=== Hayden Geological Surveys of 1872 and 1878 ===
Hayden continued to do annual exploration of the Mountain West including returning to Yellowstone in 1872 and 1878.

=== Belknap Tour of 1876 ===
In 1876, then U.S. Secretary of War William W. Belknap proposed actions to preserve Yellowstone National Park. In July 1876, Belknap visited Fort Ellis, Montana Territory, and proceeded on a two-week journey through Yellowstone retracing the route of the 1870 Washburn-Langford-Doane Expedition. He was guided during this trip by Lt. Gustavus C. Doane who was stationed at Fort Ellis and had been the leader of the military escort of the Washburn Party.

From members of Secretary [of War William W.] Belknap's party who came down recently, ... I learn that the spoliations in the park are great. There is at present no way of checking them. Several of the geysers are now nearly ruined and the Government should take some action to preserve these wonderful and beautiful curiosities before it is too late.

— Martin Magnnis, Montana Territorial Delegate, 1876 Letter to Secretary of the Interior

=== 1876 Snake River Expedition ===
In the fall of 1876, after a tedious summer dealing with the aftermath of the Battle of the Little Big Horn, Lt. Gustavus C. Doane returned to Fort Ellis, restless for more exploration. All summer he had been planning an exploration of the Snake River regions south of Yellowstone. Doane believed this exploration would gain him the same type recognition that had been bestowed on Hayden for Yellowstone and on John Wesley Powell for the Grand Canyon explorations. Although he had permission to make the exploration from his superiors Colonel John Gibbon and General Alfred Terry whom he had courted during the summer campaign, Doane did this over the head of his immediate commander, Major James Brisbin, the post commander at Fort Ellis.

By all accounts, Doane's 1876 Snake River Expedition was ill-advised and an aborted failure. Doane planned to take his troop of soldiers over the Yellowstone plateau in early winter to begin the trip down the Snake River. With an ingeniously disassembled wooden boat on pack mules, Doane and his party traveled up the Yellowstone River from Fort Ellis eventually reaching Yellowstone Lake on October 24, well behind schedule because of deep snows and brutal cold. The boat proved difficult on Yellowstone Lake because of high winds and was partially wrecked and supplies were lost. The party did not get the boat to Heart Lake until November 7. The weather and cold were brutal and Doane's party did not make the next 20 miles down the Snake to Jackson Lake until December 7, 1876. By this time, they were critically short of supplies and began killing their stock for food. The boat proved unworthy in the Snake's whitewater and was eventually completely wrecked and abandoned. On December 15, 1876, Doane and his troop were near starvation and death when they arrived at a trapper's cabin on the Snake River. Eventually, they made Keenan City, Idaho and then Fort Hall, Idaho by January 4, 1877. By this time however, word of their condition had reached Major Brisbin at Fort Ellis and with permission from General Terry, Brisbin recalled Doane and his troops to Fort Ellis against Doane's wishes. They finally arrived there on February 2, 1877. Doane had put his troops in harms way for his own ambition and almost created a tragedy. This was Doane's last foray into the Yellowstone plateau.

=== Chester A. Arthur Presidential Expedition of 1883 ===
In May 1883, President Chester A. Arthur under stress from the first years of his unexpected presidency, was encouraged to take a good rest by his advisors. One of those advisors, Senator George Vest of Missouri, suggested a trip to the new national park—Yellowstone. By early summer, the unusual trip was being arranged. President Arthur would visit the park for two weeks in August, unaccompanied by any journalists. He was the first sitting U.S. President to visit Yellowstone. Through his notoriety with the Northern Pacific Railroad and early trips to Yellowstone, Frank Jay Haynes, soon to become the official Yellowstone National Park photographer, was selected as the official photographer for the trip.

In 1882, Vest became aware of concession abuses and outright attempts at uncontrolled monopolies being proposed for Yellowstone National Park concessions by the railroads and other businessmen. He introduced and eventually helped pass legislation that required the Secretary of Interior to submit concession and construction contracts to the Senate for oversight thus stifling potential corruption and abuses. Throughout the remainder of his Senate career, Vest was considered the Self-appointed Protector of Yellowstone National Park and his encouragement of the Arthur expedition brought national attention to Yellowstone.

=== Hague Geologic Surveys of 1883-1889 ===
In 1883 Arnold Hague, a geologist, was appointed Geologist in charge of the Survey of the Yellowstone National Park and vicinity, and began field-work in August of that year with a large party of assistants, including three assistant geologists: W. H. Weed, G. M. Wright, and J. P. Iddings, a physicist: William Hallock, a chemist: F.A. Gooch, a professional photographer: William H. Jackson and a disbursing clerk: C. D. Davis. The completion of the Northern Pacific Railroad later in the summer attracted general attention to the region and added to the interest taken in the natural phenomena for which the park has become famous. Besides the geological features of the region which were the special object of the Survey, the park was to be converted into a national pleasure resort for persons interested in geysers, hot springs, and natural scenery of a remarkable character; it was to be placed under guard as a huge game presence and was subsequently set aside as a forest reserve and a protected reservoir for the headwaters of the two great rivers the Yellowstone-Missouri and the Snake or Shoshone.

In the prosecution and advancement of these diverse phases of development of the Yellowstone National Park Hague took an active and prominent part urging their importance upon the government authorities in Washington and advising as to the proper administration of the laws and regulations whereby the various features of the park could be preserved in the best manner, while its functions as a pleasure resort, game and forest reserve were properly maintained. He was an ardent advocate of the preservation of the striking features of the region in their natural state, for placing hotels and other buildings where they would not mar the attractiveness of the localities to which they were tributary. He was a vigorous opponent of the attempt to introduce a railroad in the national park. In the study of the region, he was especially interested in the geysers and hot springs but maintained a general oversight of the detailed investigations of his assistants into the geological structure of the region, which consists mostly of igneous rocks with several mountain ranges of stratified rocks. Portions of the area were investigated in detail by Hague himself. The region surveyed was more than 3,000 square miles (7,800 km^{2}) in extent and the field-work continued for seven seasons, from 1883 to 1889. The following year Weed and Iddings, under the charge of Hague, explored and mapped the geology of the area north of the Yellowstone National Park, known as the Livingston quadrangle.

=== Schwatka Winter Expedition of 1887 ===
In December 1886, Arctic explorer Frederick Schwatka planned a winter tour through the park. The expedition was sponsored by the New York World newspaper and The Century Magazine. The expedition started at Mammoth on January 5, 1887. On skis and snowshoes, pulling sleds laden with gear Schwatka, Frank Jay Haynes and eleven other guides made their way from Mammoth to Norris in two days. By the time the group got to Norris, the cold and oxygen sparse elevation had gotten to Schwatka and he had to abandon the tour. Haynes and three other guides Haynes knew and could depend on decided to continue on visiting both the lower, upper geyser basins and Yellowstone Falls before trouble struck. In an attempt to get to Yancey's from Canyon, the party got stranded for 72 hours on the slopes of Mount Washburn in a frigid and blinding snowstorm with little or no food or shelter. They almost perished. Once the weather cleared they made their way to Yancey's to recuperate before returning the Mammoth. The 29-day tour of the park on snowshoes covered nearly 200 miles, with temperatures varying −10 °F (−23 °C) to −52 °F (−47 °C) below zero. Despite the problems on Mount Washburn, Haynes returned with 42 photographs of Yellowstone in the middle of winter, the first ever taken during that time of year.

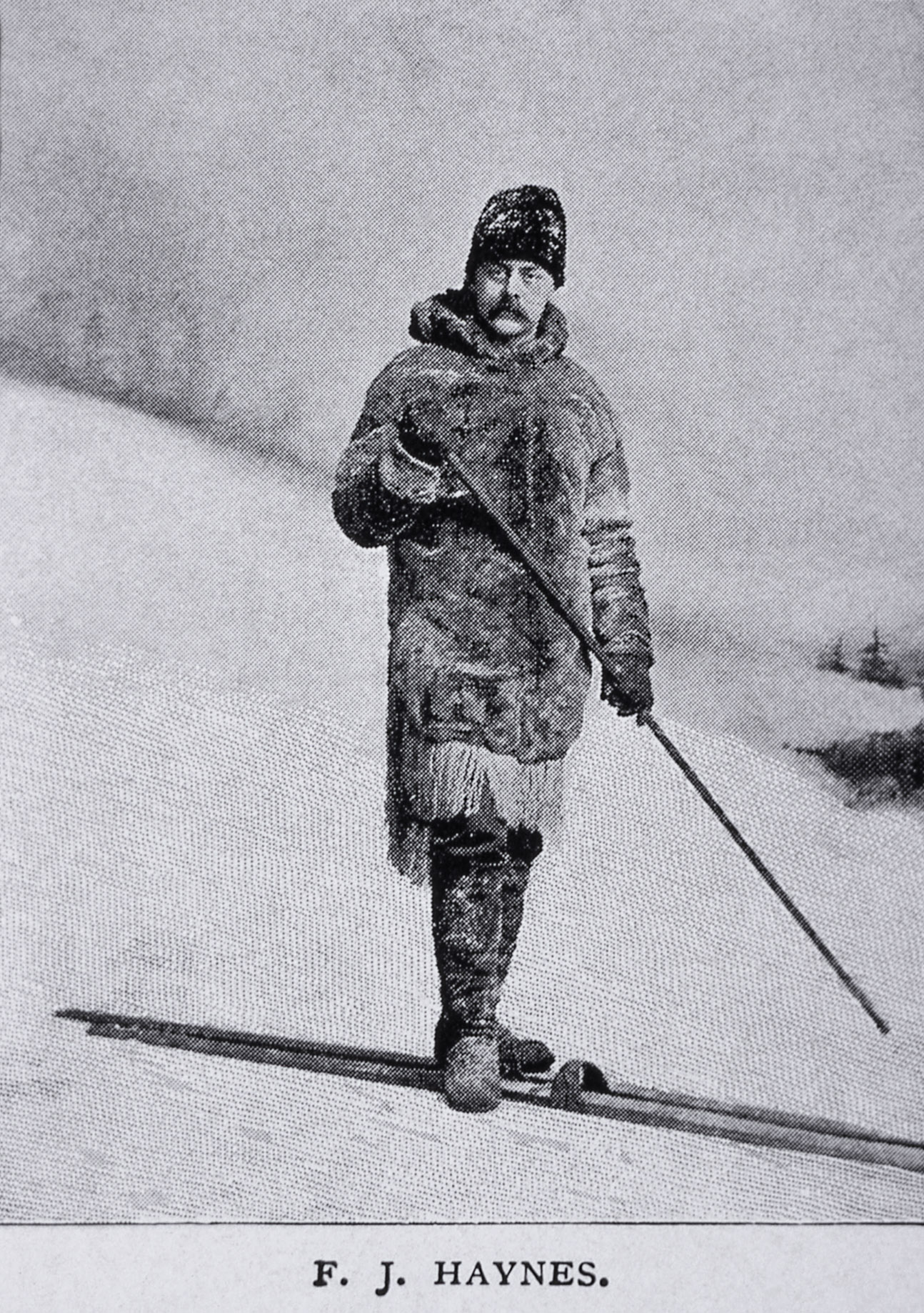
F.J. Haynes during 1887 Winter tour

== Major protective measures enacted ==
In 1872, when Yellowstone National Park was created, there was yet no legal protection for wildlife in the park. In the early years of the park, administrators, poachers, and tourists were essentially free to kill any game or predator they came across. In January 1883, U.S. Secretary of the Interior, Columbus Delano issued regulations prohibiting hunting of most park animals, but the regulations did not apply to Wolves, Coyotes, Bears, Mountain Lions, and other small predators.

Shortly after the U.S. Army took over the administration of the park on August 20, 1886, Captain Moses Harris, the first military superintendent banned public hunting of any wildlife and any predator control was to be left to the park's administration.

=== The Lacey Act of 1894 ===
In March 1894, Edgar Howell, a poacher from Cooke City, Montana was captured by Captain G. L. Scott, U.S. Army, and a patrol of soldiers for killing Bison in the Pelican Valley section of the park. Unfortunately, there were no laws that would allow prosecution of Howell and he could only be temporarily detained and removed from the park. Shortly after his capture, Frank Jay Haynes park photographer, Emerson Hough noted western author and Billy Hofer, a noted backcountry guide encountered Scott and Howell as Howell was being escorted back to Fort Yellowstone. Haines captured the encounter on film and Hough telegraphed a story back to his publisher: Forest and Stream. The story prompted George Bird Grinnell, editor of Forest and Stream to lobby Congress for a law to allow prosecution of crimes in Yellowstone. The result was the Lacey Act of 1894.

Congressman John F. Lacey was an enthusiastic defender of Yellowstone National Park and in 1894, in response to the inability of park administrators to punish poachers of the park's wildlife, Lacey sponsored legislation to give the Department of Interior authority arrest and prosecute law violators in the park. Although only known as the Lacey Act in the context of Yellowstone National Park, in May 1894 Congress passed An Act To protect the birds and animals in Yellowstone National Park, and to punish crimes in said park, and for other purposes. which became the cornerstone of future law enforcement policies in the park. The Act resulted in the appointment of John W. Meldrum as the first U.S. Commissioner in Yellowstone, a position he held until 1935.
