= Washburn–Langford–Doane Expedition =

Research expedition in the US

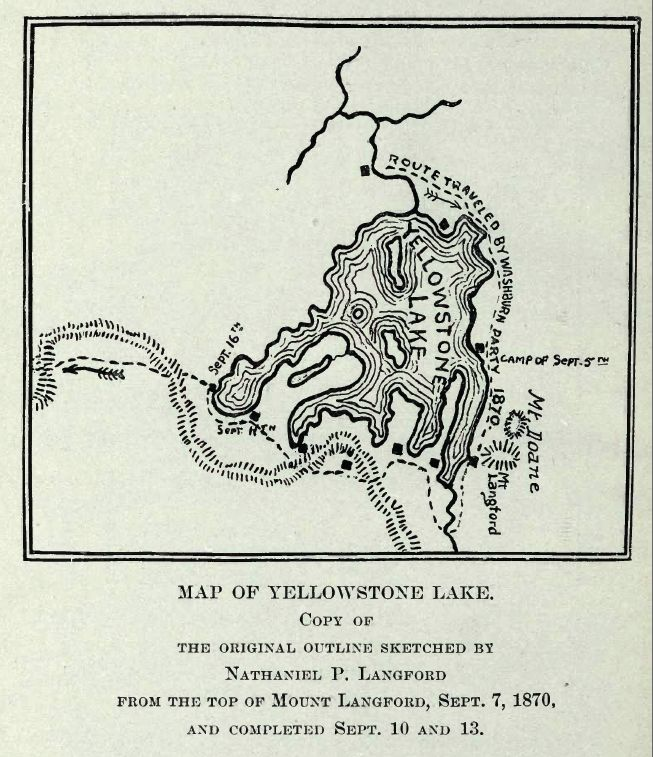
Original map of Yellowstone Lake from the Washburn Expedition

The Washburn Expedition of 1870 explored the region of northwestern Wyoming that two years later became Yellowstone National Park. Led by Henry D. Washburn and Nathaniel P. Langford, and with a U.S. Army escort headed by Lt. Gustavus C. Doane, the expedition followed the general course of the Cook–Folsom–Peterson Expedition made the previous year.

During their explorations, members of the party made detailed maps and observations of the Yellowstone region, exploring numerous lakes, climbing several mountains, and observing wildlife. The expedition visited both the Upper and Lower Geyser Basins, and after observing the regularity of eruptions of one geyser, decided to name it Old Faithful, since it erupted about once every 74 minutes.

One member of the expedition, Montana writer and lawyer Cornelius Hedges, later wrote a number of articles for a Helena, Montana-based newspaper, describing the things the expedition had witnessed. In discussions with other members of the party and in his writing for the newspaper, Hedges was a vocal supporter of setting aside the Yellowstone region as a National Park, an idea originally proposed by former acting Montana Territorial Governor Thomas Francis Meagher.

== Encouragement ==
The Washburn party was clearly inspired by the journals kept by Charles W. Cook and David E. Folsom, as well as their personal accounts. Immediately after the Cook–Folsom–Peterson Expedition, Folsom went to work as a surveyor for Washburn.

Additionally, Langford had personal connections with Jay Cooke of the Northern Pacific Railroad well before their expedition. Cooke was interested in the potential of the Yellowstone region to attract railroad business. After the expedition, Cooke financed Langford's early 1871 speeches in Virginia City, Helena, New York, Philadelphia, and Washington, D.C. about the 1870 expedition on behalf of the Northern Pacific Railroad.

On January 19, 1871, one of those speeches in Washington, D.C. was attended by geologist Ferdinand Vandeveer Hayden, who became inspired to conduct his next geological survey in the Yellowstone region. The result was the Hayden Geological Survey of 1871.

== Members of the expedition ==
- Civilian Members
  - Henry D. Washburn – Elected leader, Surveyor-General of Montana
  - Nathaniel P. Langford – former U.S. Collector of Internal Revenue, Montana Territory
  - Truman C. Everts – former U.S. Assessor for the Montana Territory
  - Judge Cornelius Hedges – U.S. Attorney, Montana Territory
  - Samuel T. Hauser – President of the First National Bank, Helena, Montana; later a Governor of the Montana Territory
  - Warren C. Gillette – King and Gillette, Helena merchants.
  - Benjamin C. Stickney Jr. – Plant, Stickney & Ellis (Freight Merchants) of Helena
  - Walter Trumbull – son of U.S. Senator Lyman Trumbull (Illinois)
  - Jacob Smith – Montana Hide and Fur Co.
  - Mr. Reynolds and Elywn Bean – Packers
  - Two African-American cooks: Nute and Johnny
- Military escort
  - Lt. Gustavus C. Doane - Escort leader, U.S. Army 2nd Cavalry, Fort Ellis, Montana Territory
  - Sergeant William Baker – U.S. Army 2nd Cavalry Fort Ellis, Montana Territory
  - Privates Charles Moore, John Williamson, William Leipler, and George W. McConnell – U.S. Army 2nd Cavalry, Fort Ellis, Montana Territory
Members of the expedition
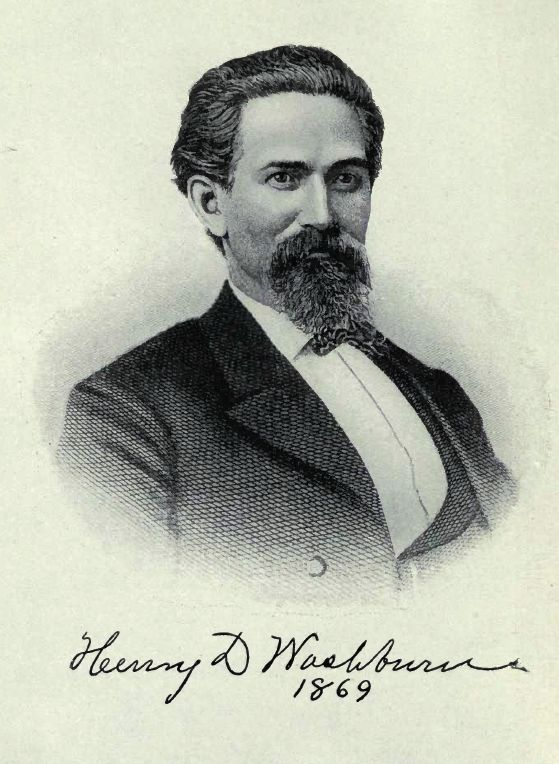
Henry Washburn, 1869

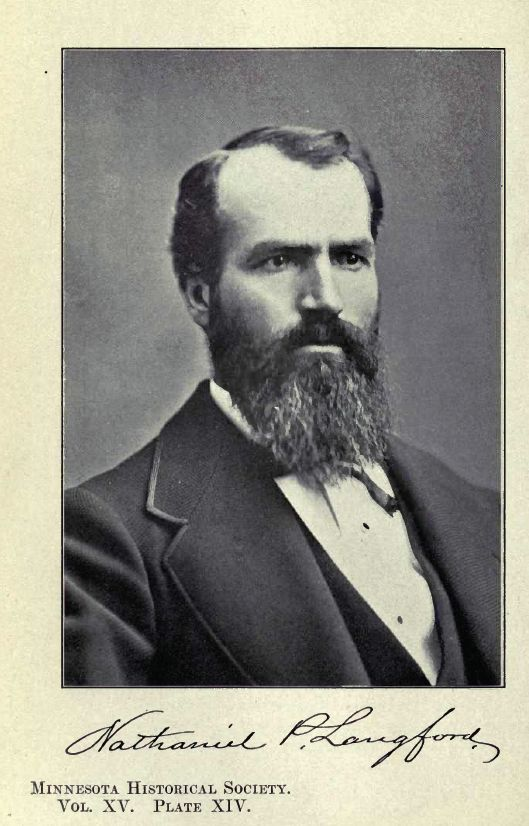
Nathaniel Pitt Langford, 1870

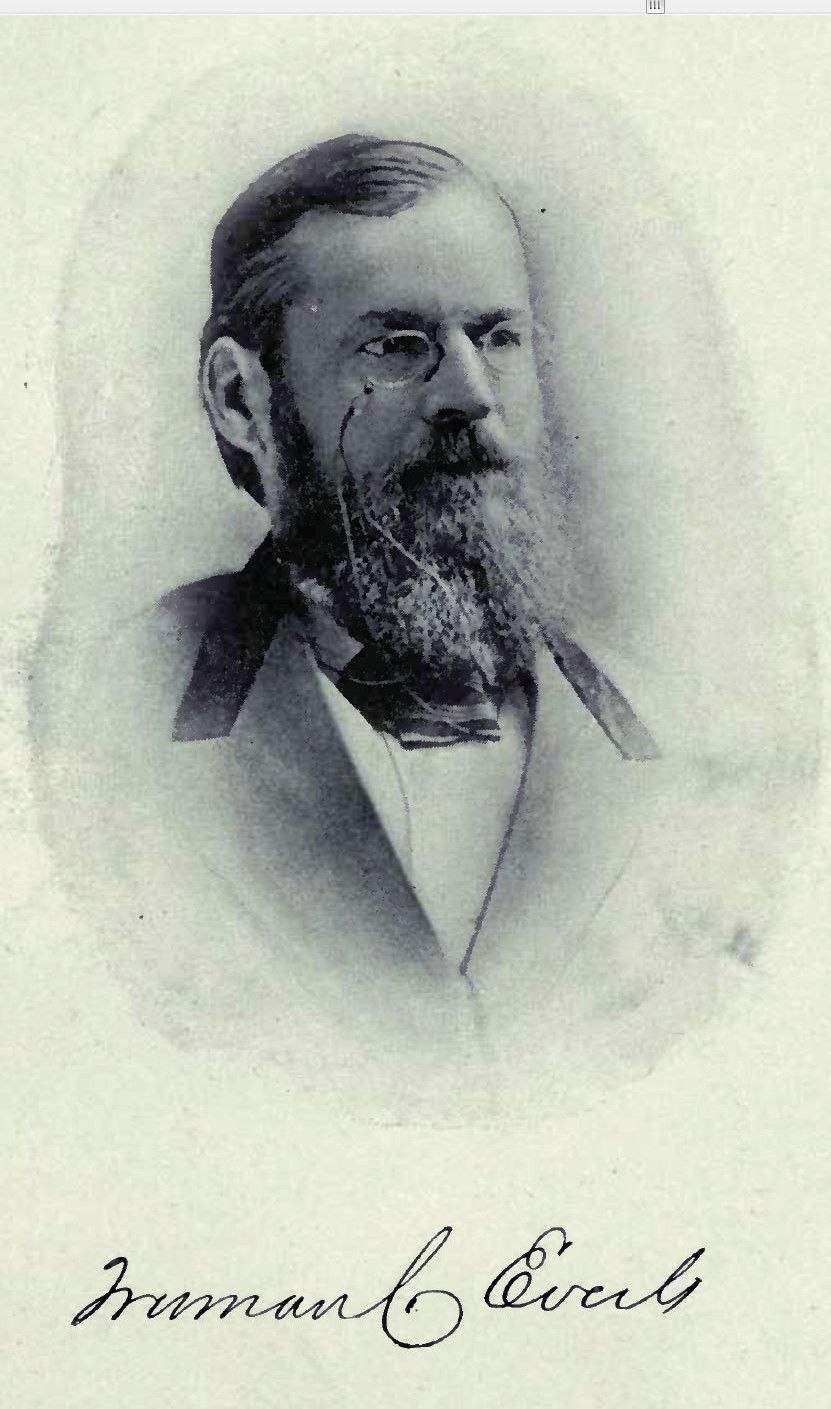
Truman C. Everts, circa 1870

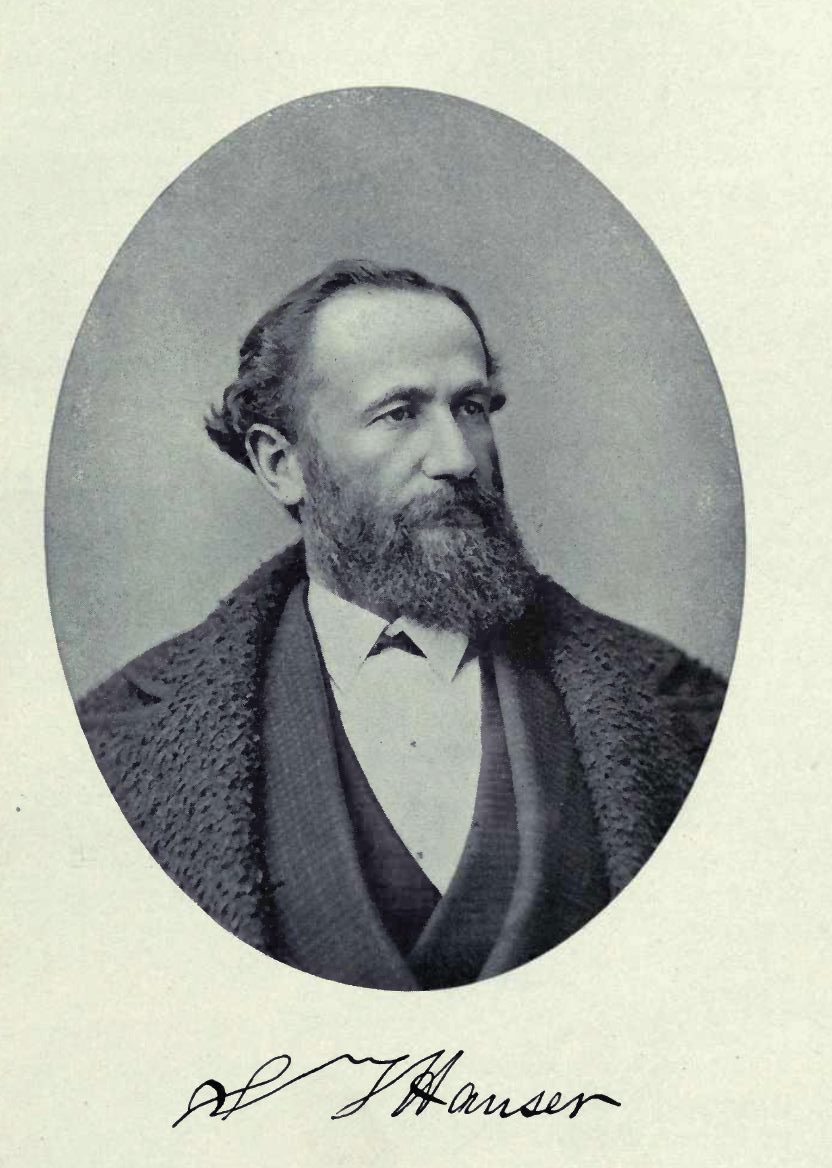
Samuel T. Hauser, circa 1870

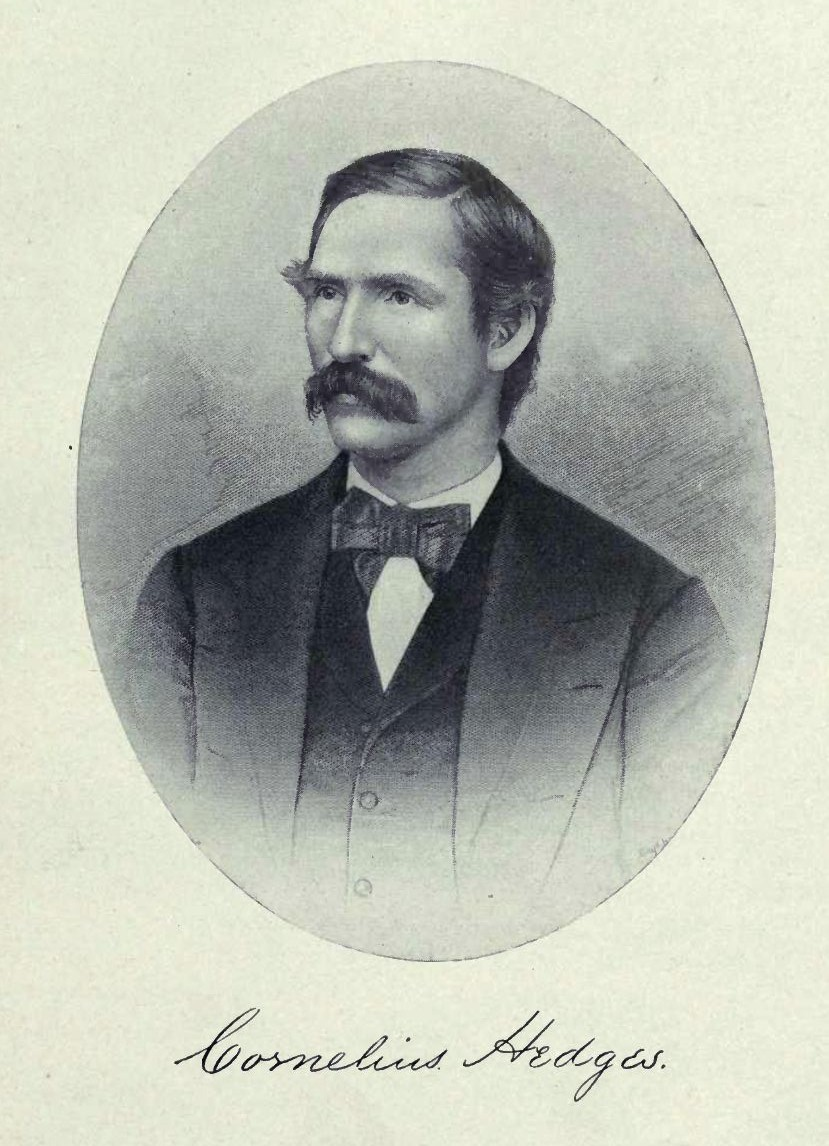
Judge Cornelius Hedges, circa 1870

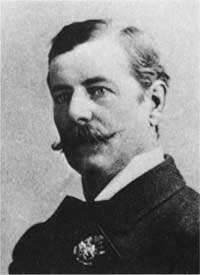
Jacob Smith, date unknown

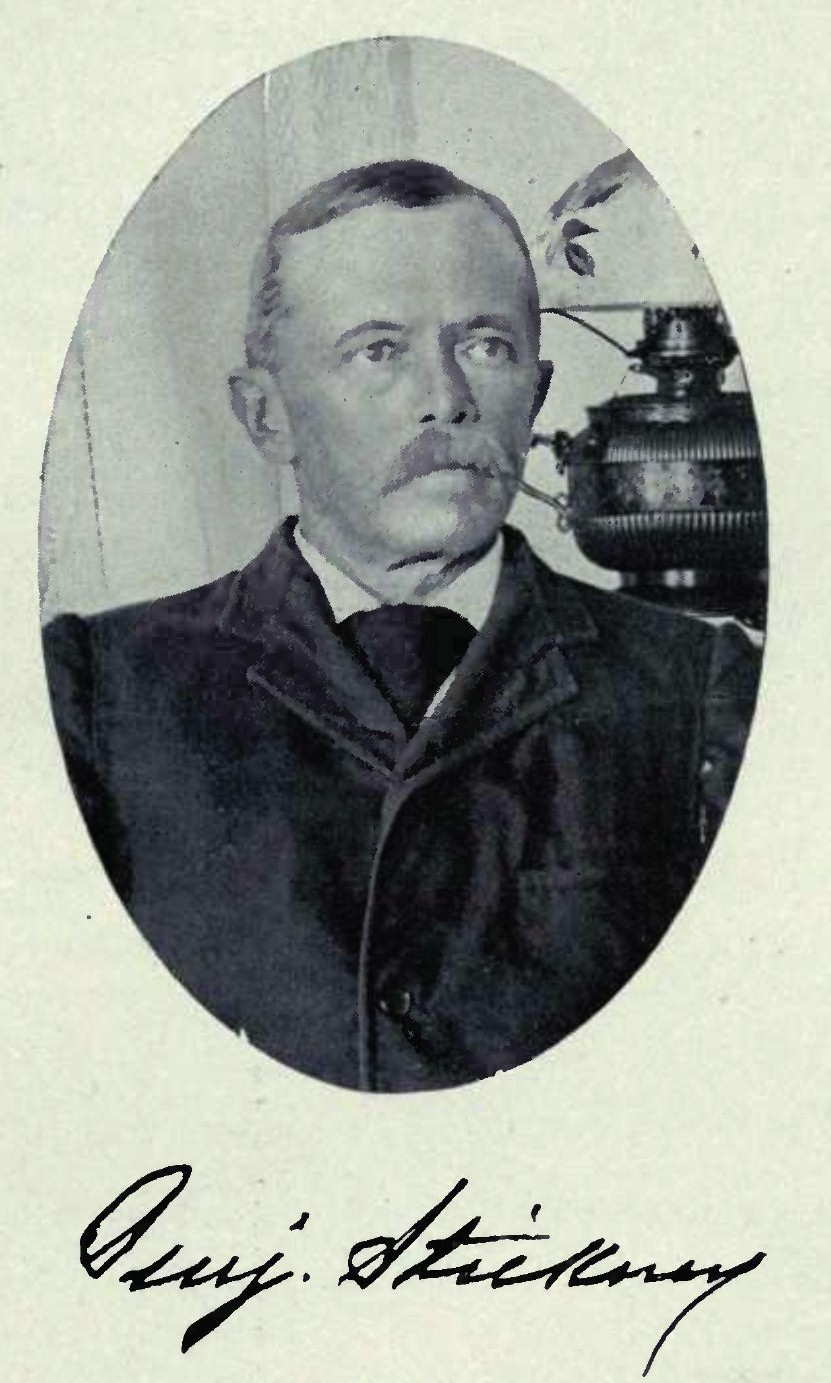
Benjamin C. Stickney Jr., circa 1870

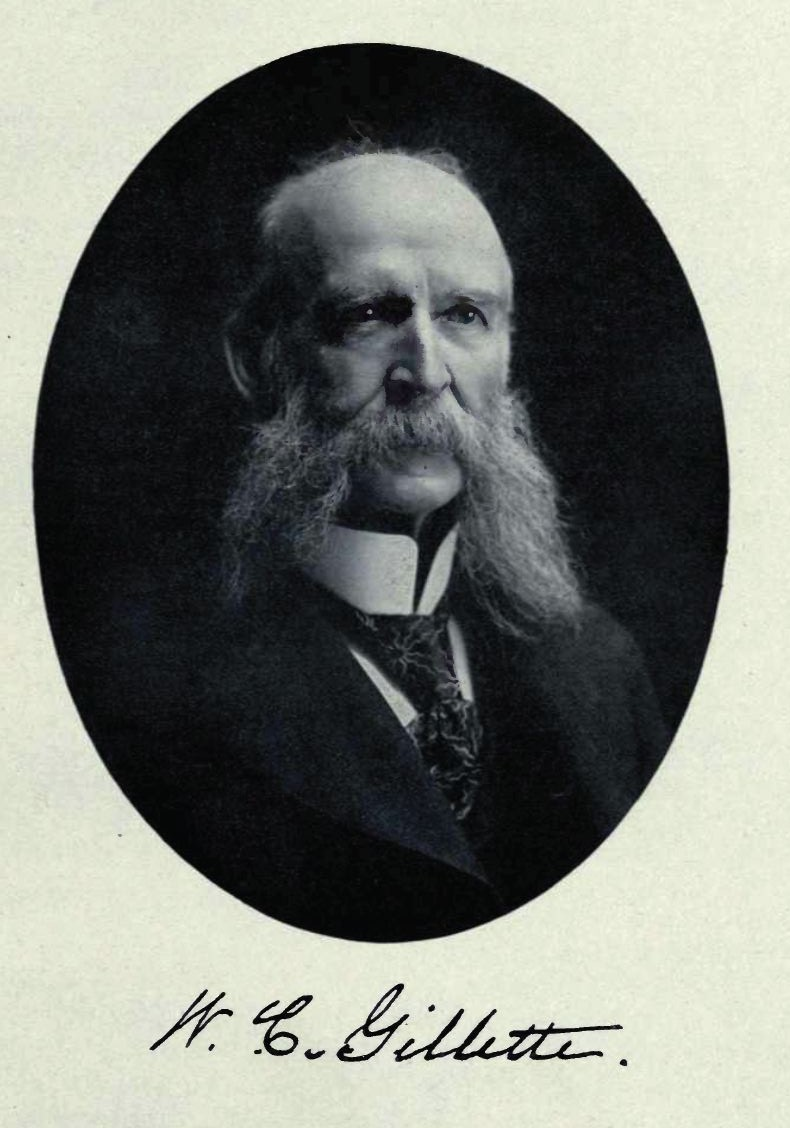
William C. Gillette, date unknown

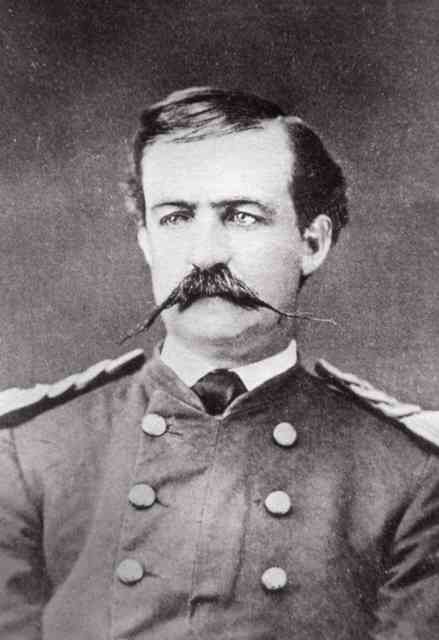
Lt. Gustavus C. Doane, 1875

== Route and chronology of the expedition ==
Summarized from Langford (1871), Doane (1871) and Chittenden (1895)

- August 16, 1870 – Nine civilians, headed by Henry Washburn depart Helena, Montana 46°35′44.9″N 112°1′37.31″W en route to Fort Ellis just east of Bozeman, Montana 45°40′40″N 111°2′50″W
- August 22, 1870 – The Washburn party departs Fort Ellis with a cavalry escorts commanded by Lt Gustavus C. Doane en route to the Yellowstone River via Bozeman Pass and Trail Creek. Camped just west of the river near Trail Creek45°30′11″N 110°50′52″W.
- August 26, 1870 – After four days travel up the western shore and foothills of the Yellowstone River and past the Devil's Slide, the party arrived and camped near the mouth of the Gardner River45°01′46″N 110°42′03″W. The party traveled up the west side of the Yellowstone along the ridges above the river for several days to Tower Creek near Tower Fall44°53′38″N 110°23′14″W.
- August 29, 1870 – After several days of local exploration, the party leaves Tower Creek and ascends what they later name Mount Washburn44°47′51″N 110°26′00″W. From Mount Washburn the party can see south into the Grand Canyon of the Yellowstone, the Hayden Valley44°38′38″N 110°27′20″W and Yellowstone Lake.
- August 30, 1870 – The party reached the Yellowstone Falls44°42′46″N 110°29′59″W and spent several days exploring the canyon and thermal features near the river.
- September 3, 1870 – After crossing the Yellowstone river, the party proceeded up the valley to Yellowstone Lake, camping just east of the lake's outlet.
- September 7, 1870 – By this date, the party had traveled south along the eastern shore of Yellowstone Lakes to its headwaters. During this time, Langford and Doane ascended peaks in the Absaroka Range that were ultimately named for them: Mount Langford and Mount Doane.
- September 9, 1870 – The party reached Two Ocean Pass44°02′28″N 110°10′03″W, near the headwaters of both the Snake River and Yellowstone River. It was in camp the evening of September 9 that the party discovered that T.C. Everts was missing.
- September 16, 1870 – After extensive unsuccessful searches for Mr. Everts, the party eventually traveled along the southern reaches of the lake to the West Thumb area.
- September 18, 1870 – Most of the party departed the lake, traveling west over what is now called Craig Pass46°26′30″N 110°43′11″W into the Firehole basin. Mr. Gillette, Privates Moore and Williamson remained behind to continue the search for Mr. Everts. About noon on the 18th, the party after having traveled down the upper Firehole River emerged upon Old Faithful44°27′37.81″N 110°49′41.18″W and the upper geyser basin.
- September 19, 1870 – The party, having explored the upper geyser basin and named seven geysers, traveled down the Firehole to the Madison River camping at what is now known as Madison Junction 44°38′45″N 110°51′37″W. National Park Mountain Video
- September 23, 1870 – After the party travels several days down the Madison, Lt Doane and his soldiers left the party on the Madison River near the trail to Virginia City and traveled back to Fort Ellis, arriving on the afternoon of the 24th. Washburn, Langford and the other civilians traveled back to Helena.
- October 2, 1870 – Gillette, Private Moore and Williamson arrive at Fort Ellis having been un-successful in their search for Mr. Everts.
- October 10, 1870 – Mr. Everts is found alive on the benches above the Gardner river by a three-man search party organized in Helena.

== Period accounts by members of the expedition ==
- Langford, Nathaniel P. (May–June 1871). "The Wonders of the Yellowstone". Scribner's Monthly. II (1–2).
- Everts, Truman C. (November 1871). "Thirty-seven Days of Peril". Scribner's Monthly. III (1).
- The report of Lieutenant Gustavus C. Doane upon the so-called Yellowstone Expedition of 1870, presented to the Secretary of War, February 1871
- The Washburn Yellowstone Expedition, accounts of Trumbull published in the Overland Monthly, Vol 6, No 5–6, May–June 1871
- Hedges, Cornelius (1904). "Journal of Judge Cornelius Hedges, Member of the "Washburn Expedition of 1870"". Contributions to the Historical Society of Montana. V: 370–394.
- Langford, Nathaniel Pitt (1905). The Discovery of Yellowstone Park; Diary of the Washburn Expedition to the Yellowstone and Firehole Rivers in the Year 1870. St. Paul, MN: By the author. Second edition: St. Paul, MN: F. E. Haynes, 1923.
Drawings and art from original accounts
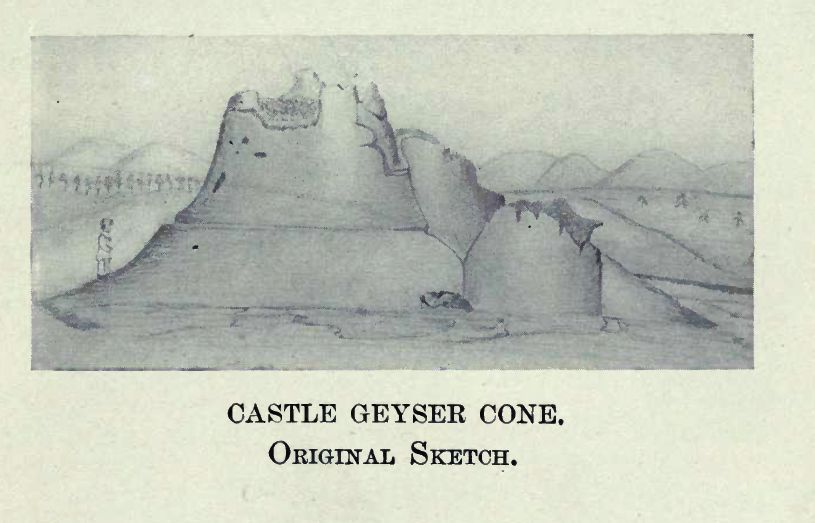
Castle Geyser Cone by Private Moore

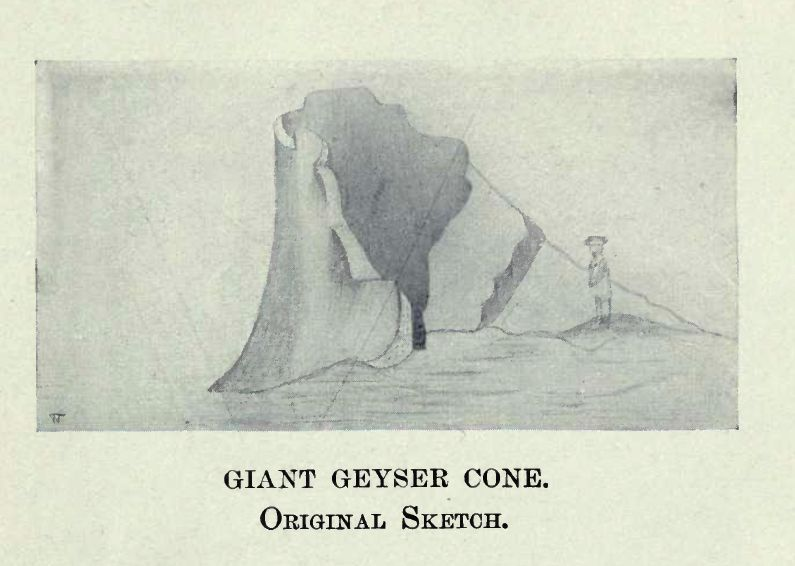
Giant Geyser by Private Moore

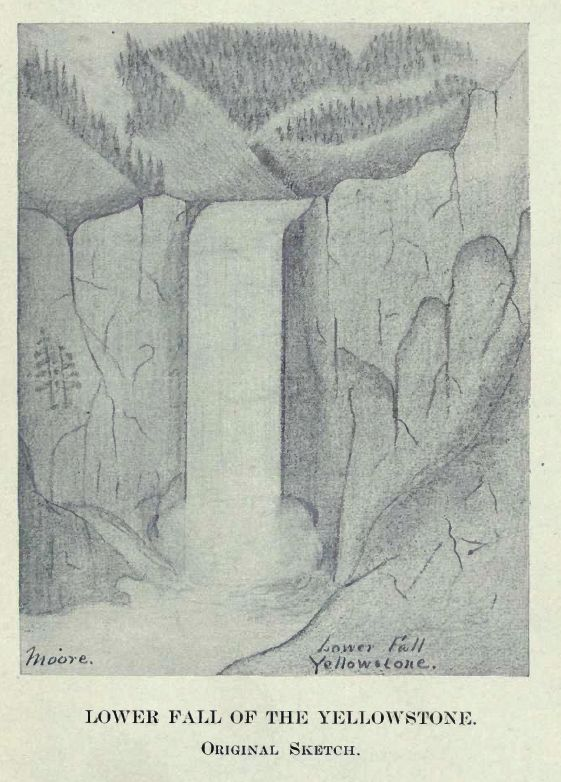
Lower Yellowstone Falls by Private Moore

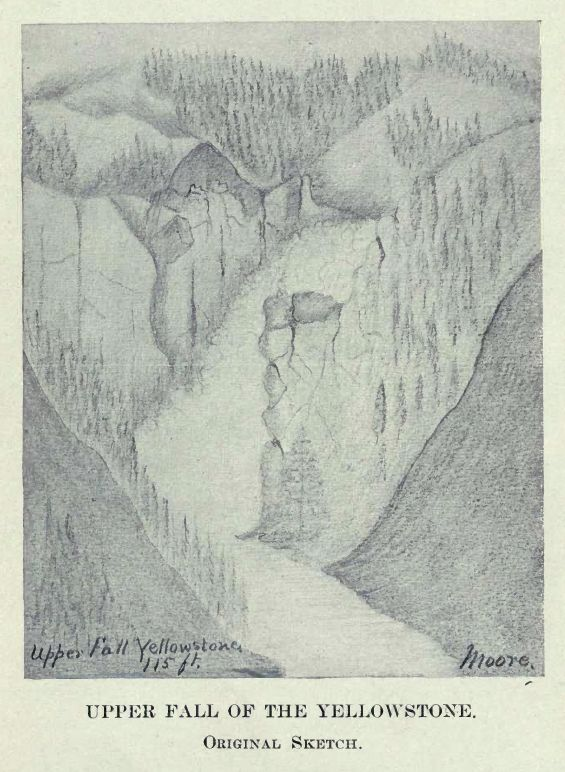
Upper Yellowstone Falls by Private Moore

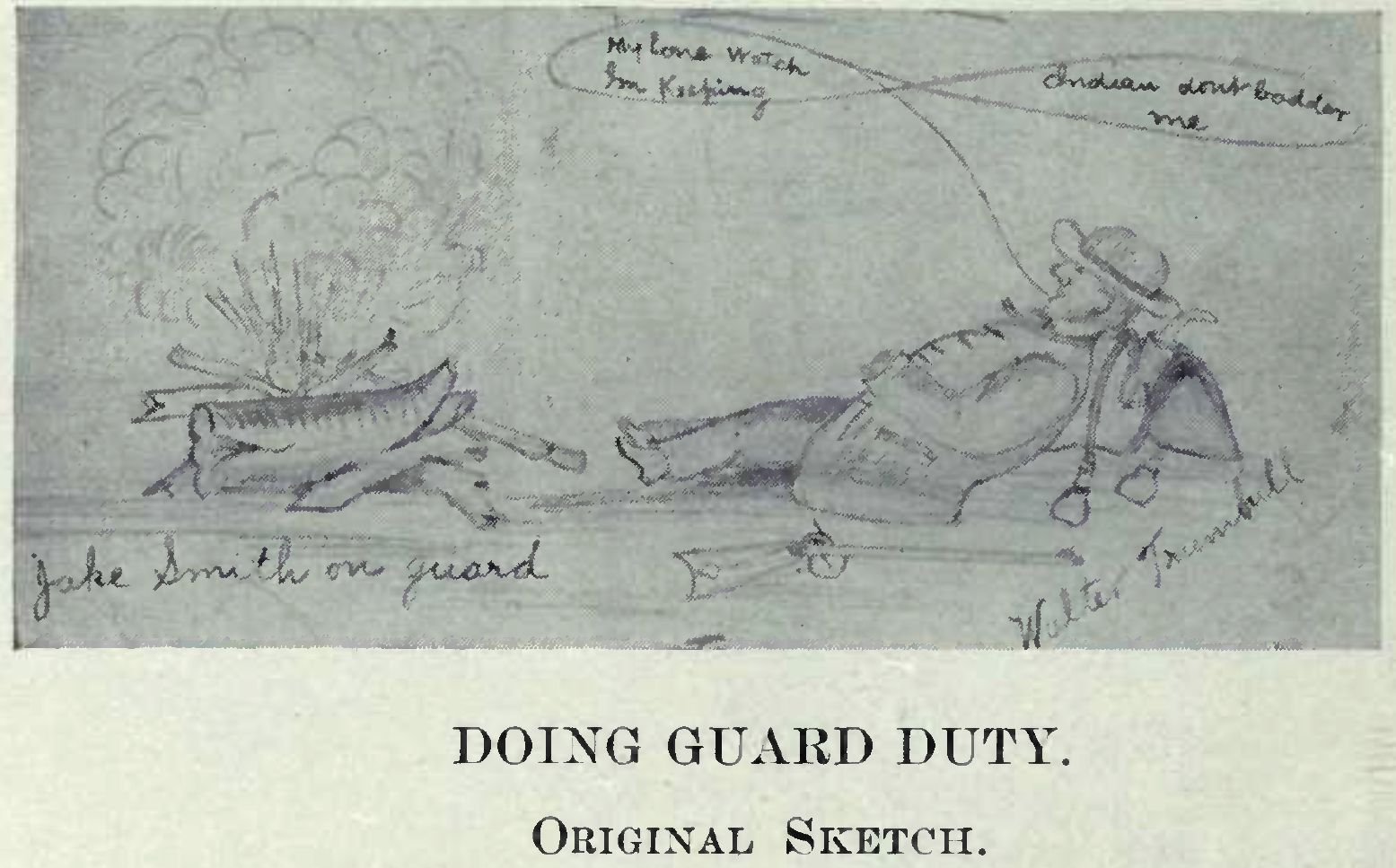
Jake Smith Doing Guard Duty, by Walter Trumbull

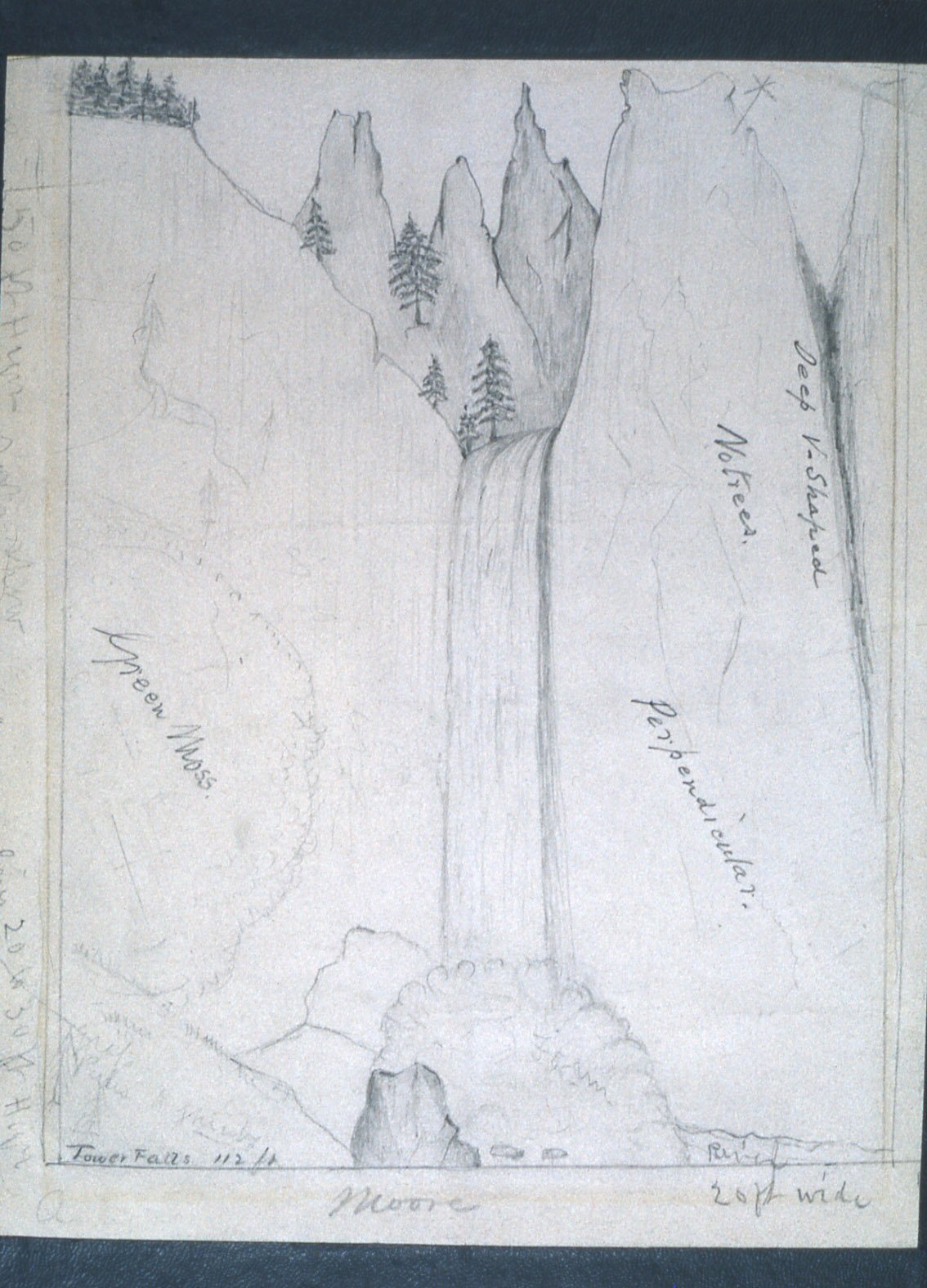
Tower Fall, Private Moore

=== Park features named by the expedition ===
As documented by Aubrey L. Haines in Yellowstone Place Names (1996).

- Geysers
  - Beehive Geyser
  - Castle Geyser
  - Fan Geyser – Originally Fantail Geyser
  - Giant Geyser
  - Giantess Geyser
  - Grotto Geyser
  - Old Faithful
- Peaks
  - Mount Washburn
- Waterfalls
  - Tower Fall

=== Park features named to honor members of the expedition ===
- Hedges Peak
- Langford Cairn
- Mount Doane
- Mount Everts
- Mount Langford

== See also ==
- Expeditions and the protection of Yellowstone (1869–1890)
