= Folsom Peak =

Mountain in Wyoming, United States

- Location within Wyoming

Highest point
- Elevation: 9,334 ft (2,845 m)
- Coordinates: 44°52′22″N 110°32′51″W

Geography
- Location: Yellowstone National Park, Park County, Wyoming
- Parent range: Washburn Range
- Topo map: Cook Peak

Folsom Peak, elevation 9,334 feet (2,845 m), is a mountain peak in the Washburn Range of Yellowstone National Park. The peak was named in 1895 by geologist Arnold Hague to honor David E. Folsom, a member of the Cook–Folsom–Peterson Expedition of 1869. Folsom, Peterson and Cook were some of the first explorers of the Yellowstone region to publish their explorations.

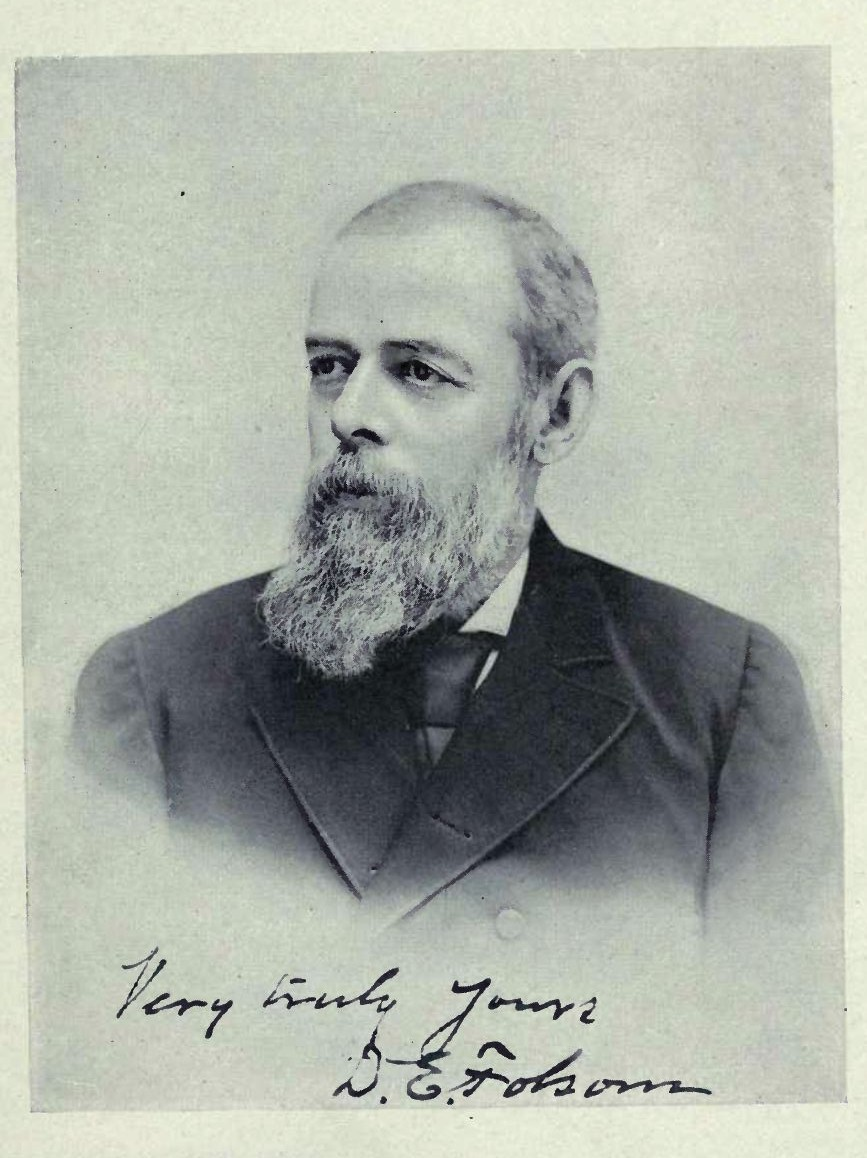
Folsom Peak's namesake, David E. Folsom

== See also ==
- Mountains and mountain ranges of Yellowstone National Park
