= Cook–Folsom–Peterson Expedition =

Research expedition in the United States

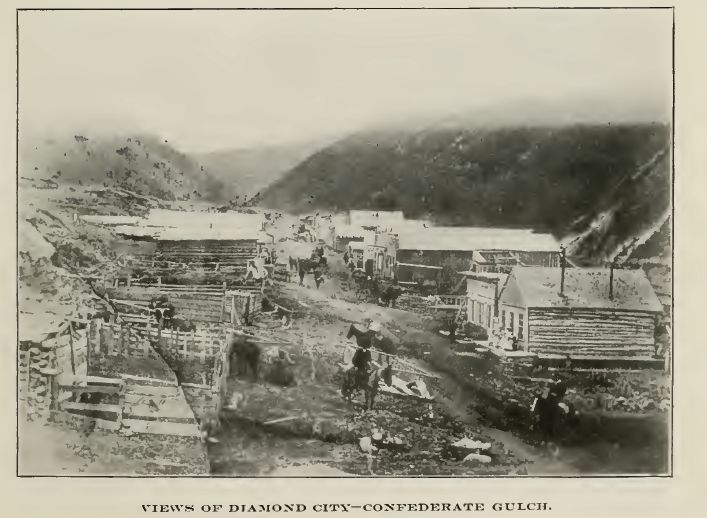
Diamond City, Montana circa 1870

The Cook–Folsom–Peterson Expedition of 1869 was the first organized expedition to explore the region that became Yellowstone National Park. The privately financed expedition was carried out by David E. Folsom, Charles W. Cook and William Peterson of Diamond City, Montana, a gold camp in the Confederate Gulch area of the Big Belt Mountains east of Helena, Montana. The journals kept by Cook and Folsom, as well as their personal accounts to friends were of significant inspirational value to spur the organization of the Washburn-Langford-Doane Expedition which visited Yellowstone in 1870.

== Expedition route ==
The party of three explorers departed Diamond City, Montana 46°35′50″N 111°25′26″W on September 6, 1869, and traveled up the Missouri River to Three Forks, Montana45°53′29″N 111°33′6″W. They then began the easterly march up the Gallatin Valley, stopping in Bozeman, Montana45°40′40″N 111°2′50″W for supplies on September 8, 1869. From Bozeman, they moved to the shadows of Bozeman Pass, camping four miles east of Fort Ellis. On September 10, 1869, they struck out over the pass and down Trail Creek 45°30′11″N 110°50′52″W to reach the Yellowstone River near Emigrant Gulch. They followed the river south until they entered the park region on September 13, 1869, at the confluence of the Gardner and Yellowstone rivers near present-day Gardiner, Montana44°57′15″N 110°52′03″W. After crossing the mouth of the Gardner River, they traveled along the benches above the western side of the Yellowstone until they reached Tower Fall. At Tower Fall they forded the Yellowstone and explored the East Fork (Lamar River) and Lamar Valley probably as far as the confluence with Calfee Creek 44°46′53″N 110°06′54″W. From there, the party returned to the Yellowstone in a due West route which brought them to the area of Yellowstone Falls and the Grand Canyon of the Yellowstone. The party continued south along the course of the Yellowstone River crossing the river twice until they reached the north shore of Yellowstone Lake near the mouth of Pelican Creek44°33′12″N 110°21′37″W. From Pelican Creek, Cook-Folsom-Peterson followed the western shoreline of Yellowstone lake closely until they reached the West Thumb area. From West Thumb, the party stuck out due West over the Continental Divide and emerged on the northernmost point of Shoshone Lake44°22′20″N 110°42′45″W. Turning northwest, they again crossed the divide and began traveling down the Firehole River into the geyser basins. They followed the Firehole River then Madison River out of the region, exiting the current park boundary near what is now the town of West Yellowstone, Montana44°39′45″N 111°6′21″W on October 3, 1869. They followed the Madison down through Madison Canyon, emerging into familiar territory of the lower Madison River and mountains to the west around Virginia City, Montana45°17′39″N 111°56′28″W. On the evening of October 11, 1869, Cook, Folsom and Peterson, after 36 days of travel returned to Diamond City, Montana.

=== Expedition chronology ===
- August 1869 - Cook and Folsom, ready to join another expedition that did not materialize, decide to go to the Yellowstone region on their own. Peterson, a friend and co-worker in Diamond City, Montana agrees to join Cook and Folsom.
- September 6, 1869 - Cook, Folsom and Peterson depart Diamond City, Montana. They camp at Crow Creek 46°11′37″N 111°29′16″W, 30 miles south of Diamond City.
- September 7, 1869 - traveling down the Missouri River they pass through Three Forks and head east up the Gallatin Valley camping at Hamilton (near present-day Manhattan, Montana45°51′27″N 111°19′52″W.
- September 8, 1869 - continued east to Bozeman, Montana to re-supply, eventually camping just east of Fort Ellis.
- September 10, 1869 - up over Bozeman Pass then immediately southeast down Trail Creek to the Yellowstone River opposite Emigrant Gulch.
- September 11, 1869 - traveled south along the Yellowstone to the southern end of Paradise Valley camping close to the river in Yankee Jim Canyon 45°11′43″N 110°54′05″W.
- September 13, 1869 - continued south along the Yellowstone, crossing the mouth of the Gardner River and moving up on the benches above the Black Canyon of the Yellowstone. They camped at what was to become known as Rescue Creek44°58′18″N 110°35′22″W.
- September 14, 1869 - the party continued along the benches above the Black Canyon to Tower Fall. They camped at Tower Fall for two days, leaving on September 16, 1869
- September 16, 1869 - crossing the Yellowstone at Tower Fall, they traveled east until they encountered the East Fork (Lamar River). They travel up the Lamar River camping at the confluence with Calfee Creek.
- September 17–18, 1869 - camped just 6 miles southeast of the previous camp in the parkland above Flint Creek 44°47′15″N 110°07′11″W to sit out a snowstorm.
- September 19, 1869 - traveled a hard eight miles west toward the Yellowstone camping near Sour Creek.
- September 20, 1869 - continued to travel west over timbered and broken terrain to the Basin Group of hot springs on Shallow Creek. The group referred to these springs as the Chemical Works.
- September 21, 1869 - the group continued west for 18 miles emerging on the rim of the Grand Canyon of the Yellowstone just downstream from the falls at a point that is now named Inspiration Point. They move up river a few miles camping just above the Upper Falls until September 23, 1869. On September 22, 1869, they descend the canyon between the falls, ford the river and try to scale the northern wall of the canyon. This fails and they must return the way they came.
- September 23, 1869 - they travel up the Yellowstone through today's Hayden Valley to the Mud Volcano area 44°37′29″N 110°26′03″W where they camp.
- September 24, 1869 - continued up the eastern shoreline of the Yellowstone, eventually crossing Pelican Creek before encountering the north shore of Yellowstone Lake near the mouth of Pelican Creek.
- September 24, 1869 - departing Pelican Creek, the group crossed the outlet of Yellowstone Lake near present-day Fishing Bridge and followed the shoreline to the current location of Bridge Bay marina where they camped for the night.
- September 25, 1869 - they continued along the shoreline to the West Thumb Geyser Basin 44°25′07″N 110°34′23″W where they camped and explored for two days.
- September 26–27, 1869 - explored the geothermal features of West Thumb
- September 29, 1869 - departed West Thumb westerly en route to the Madison River drainage. The route took them across the Continental Divide to the upper end of Shoshone Lake. They camped in the vicinity.
- September 30, 1869 - traveling north up deLacy Creek from the Shoshone Lake area, the group had a difficult time re-crossing the divide. They camped on the divide that night.
- October 1, 1869 - after crossing the divide, the party stayed east of the Firehole until they followed White Creek down into the Lower Geyser Basin where they saw the Great Fountain Geyser erupt. They camped just south of the geyser.
- October 2, 1869 - the group explored the area upstream on the Firehole River from their camp for about five miles, taking them into the Midway Geyser Basin. There they saw the Excelsior Geyser erupt before heading back down the Firehole River to the Madison River.
- October 3, 1869 - the group eventually emerged from Madison Canyon (the present day site of the 1959 Hebgen Lake earthquake). From that point on they were in familiar territory.
- October 11, 1869 - the Cook-Folsom-Peterson party arrived in Diamond City.

== Accounts of the expedition ==
Shortly after his return from Yellowstone, Folsom was employed as field surveyor by Henry D. Washburn, the Surveyor General of the Montana Territory. While in that office, Cook and Folsom shared their experiences and diaries with Washburn and W. W. deLacy, the territorial map maker. From these discussions, deLacy published an updated map of the Yellowstone region.

When the Washburn party traveled into Yellowstone in August 1870, Henry D. Washburn was carrying copies of the Cook and Folsom diaries and the deLacy map.

Once Folsom was back in Helena, Montana as a surveyor, his friends Nathaniel P. Langford and Samuel Thomas Hauser asked him to give a talk on the expedition to a group of prominent Helena citizens. Folsom refused to relate the experiences publicly because he thought nobody would believe him. However, those who knew Folsom well, believed him and credited him with the inspiration needed to organize the Washburn-Langford-Doane Expedition in 1870.

Both Cook and Folsom kept journals during the trip. Peterson did not. After the expedition, Cook combined the two journals into a single version. This version was submitted to both the New York Tribune and Scribners for publication. Both declined citing the unreliability and improbability of the information. It was finally published in a significantly edited version in the Western Monthly Magazine. In 1904, a version of the account was published in the Contributions to the Historical Society of Montana. Sometime around 1900, William Peterson wrote A Reminiscence of William Peterson which was later published in the Yellowstone Interpreter in 1964. Charles Cook lived to participate in the 50th Anniversary celebration of Yellowstone's creation in 1922. That year he authored the Reconstructed Diary of the Cook-Folsom Diary, published in the Haynes Bulletin in 1922–23. The most accurate and comprehensive account of the expedition was produced by Aubrey L. Haines, the Yellowstone National Park historian in 1965 when he produced The Valley of the Upper Yellowstone which was masterfully reconstructed from all the previous fragmented accounts.

=== Names given to park features ===
The Cook–Folsom–Peterson Expedition did not name any park features discovered during the expedition that have persisted to the present day. In their journals they did refer to many features incorrectly (based on incomplete or inaccurate maps made from previous accounts), thus causing some confusion that had to be sorted out by later explorations and surveys. One name that took a few years to sort out was Madison Lake, the small pond that is the headwater of the Firehole River. In some accounts, Shoshone Lake was actually referred to as Madison Lake because many believed Shoshone Lake was at the headwater of the Madison River drainage

=== Park features named in honor of expedition members ===
- Folsom Peak (9,334 feet (2,845 m)) - 44.87083°N 110.54615°W
- Cook Peak (9,754 feet (2,973 m)) - 44.84029°N 110.57327°W

== Members of the expedition ==
Images of expedition members
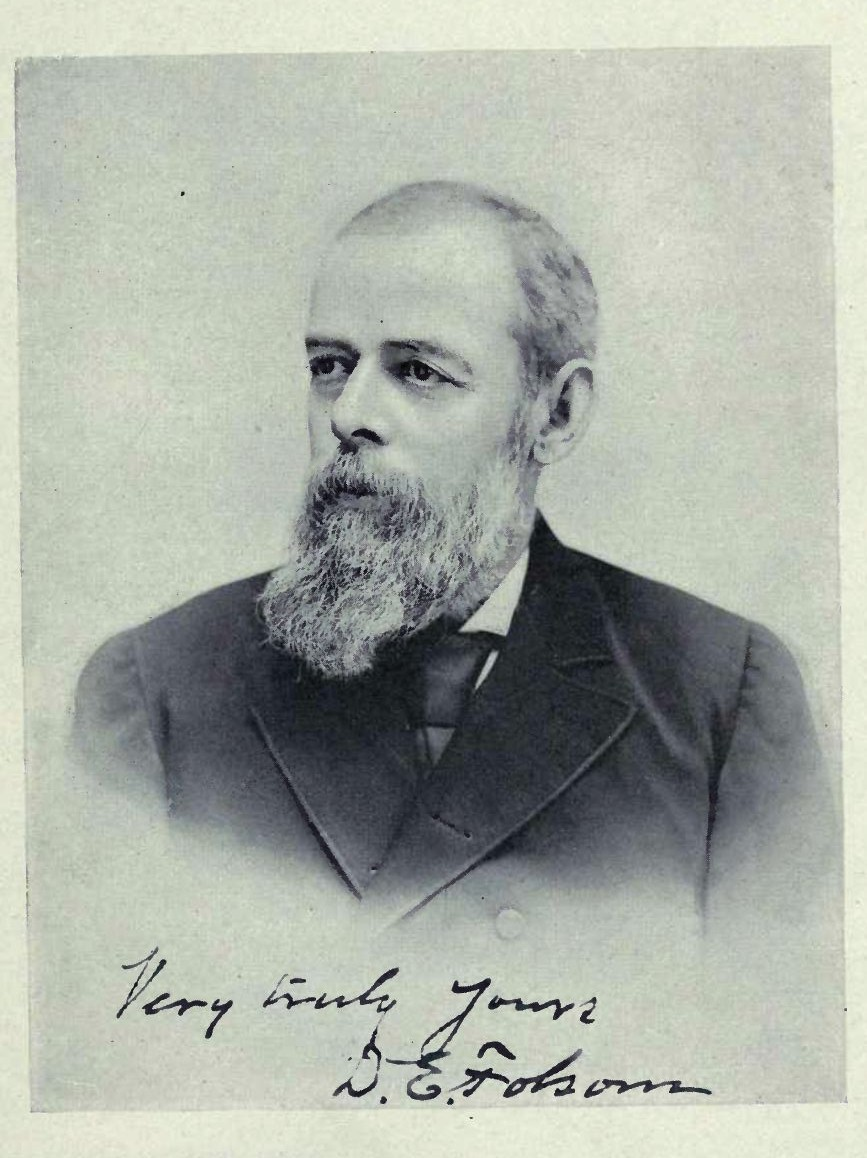
David E. Folsom

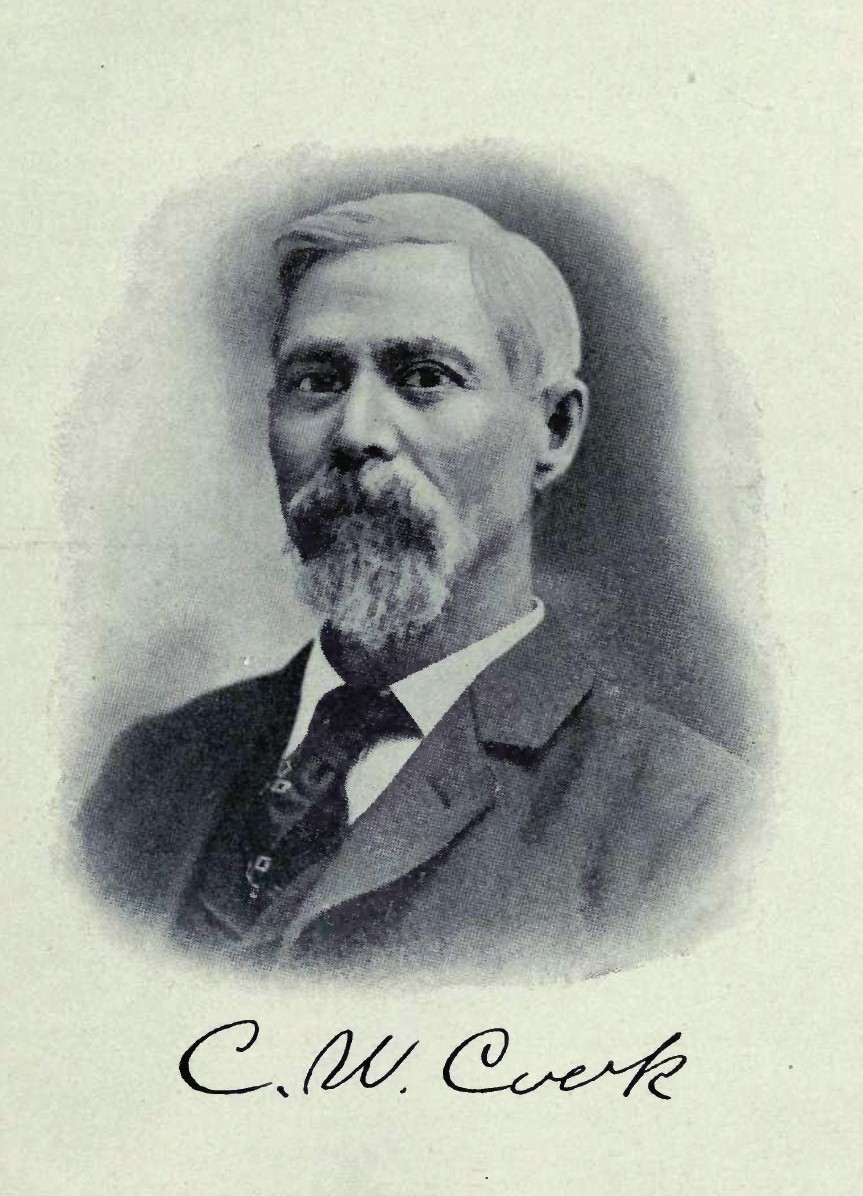
C.W. Cook

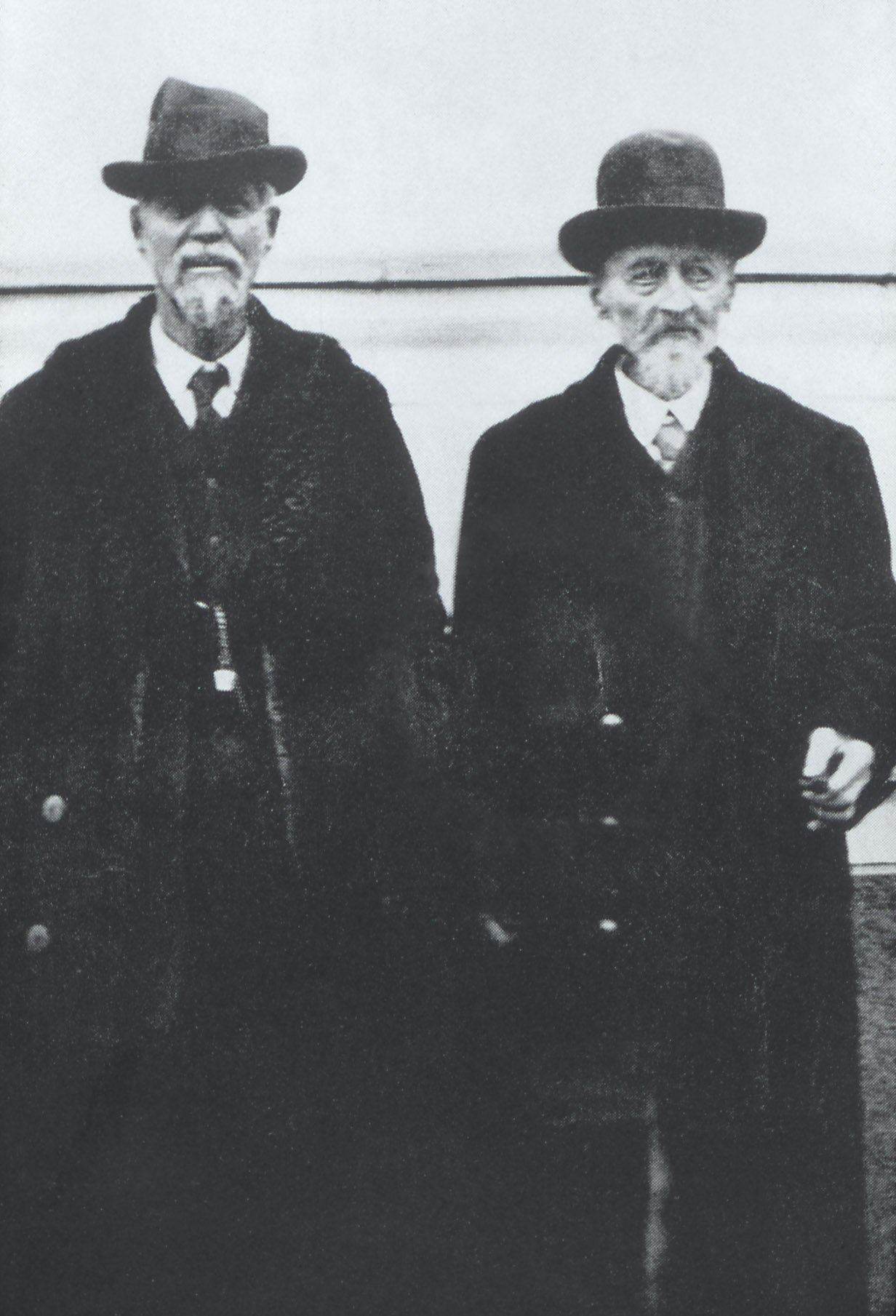
C.W. Cook and William Peterson, dt unk

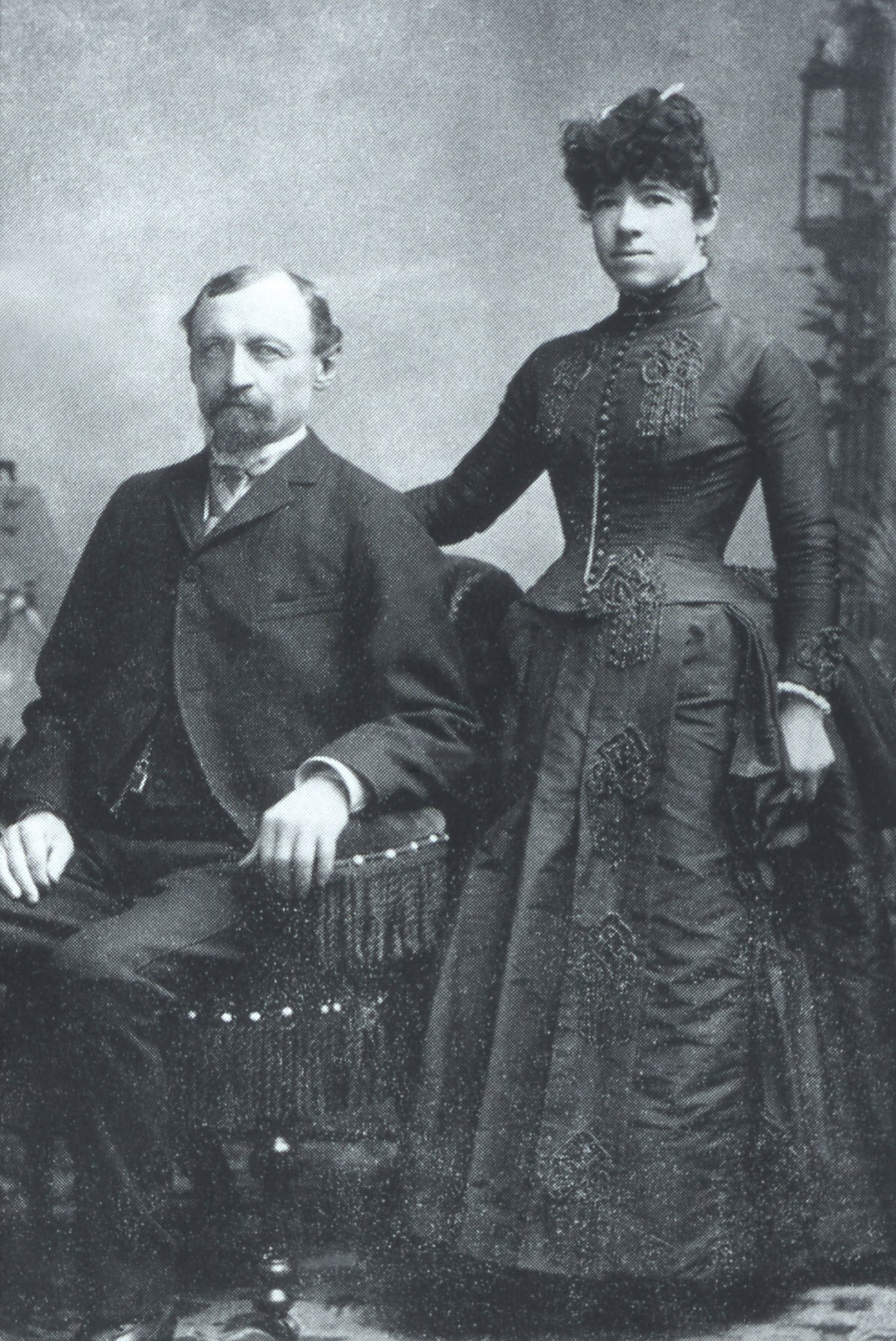
William Peterson and his wife, circa 1890

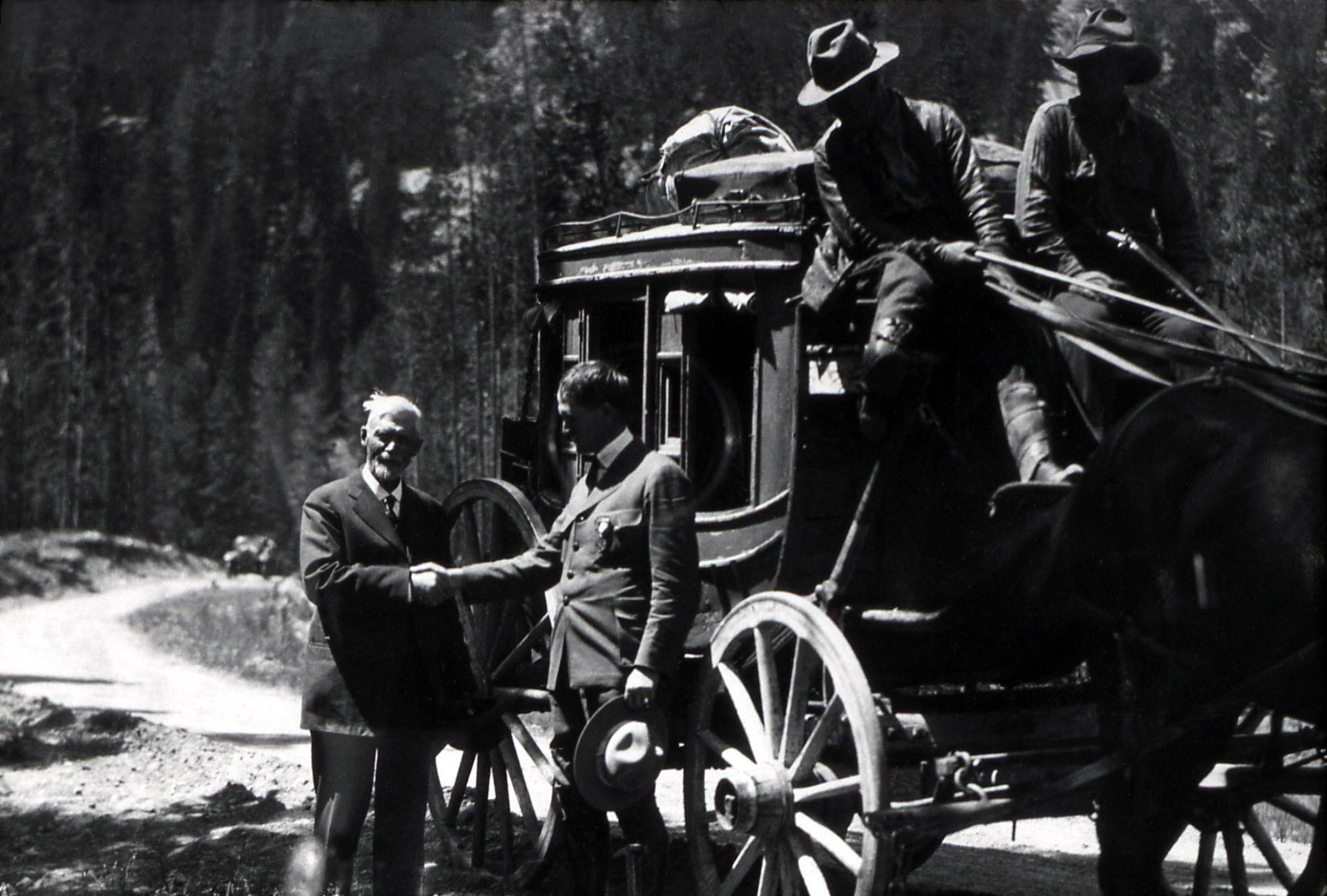
C.W. Cook and Horace Albright, 1922

== See also ==
- Washburn–Langford–Doane Expedition
- Hayden Geological Survey of 1871
- Expeditions and the protection of Yellowstone (1869-1890)
