= Tower Fall =

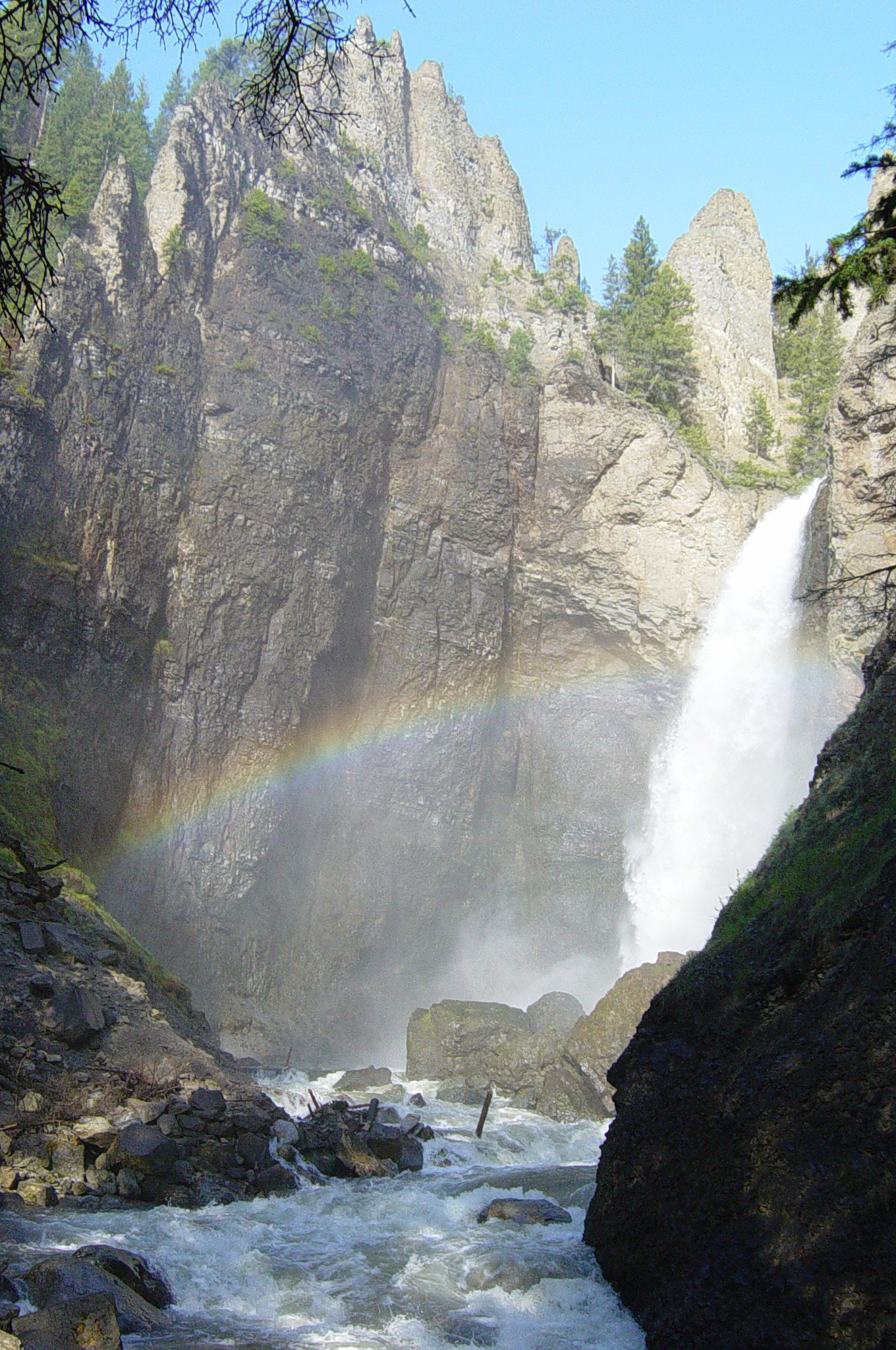
- Tower Fall
- Interactive map of Tower Fall
- Location: Yellowstone National Park, Park County, Wyoming, US
- Coordinates: 44.8936°N 110.3872°W
- Type: Plunge
- Elevation: 6,342 feet (1,933 m)
- Total height: 132 feet (40 m)
- Number of drops: 1
- Watercourse: Tower Creek

Tower Fall is a waterfall on Tower Creek in the northeastern region of Yellowstone National Park, in the U.S. state of Wyoming. Approximately 1,000 yards (910 m) upstream from the creek's confluence with the Yellowstone River, the fall plunges 132 feet (40 m). Its name comes from the rock pinnacles at the top of the fall. Tower Creek and Tower Fall are located approximately three miles south of Roosevelt Junction on the Tower-Canyon road.

== History ==
On September 15–16, 1869, members of the Cook–Folsom–Peterson Expedition spent a whole day in the Tower Fall area before crossing the river and traveling up the East Fork of the Yellowstone (Lamar River).

In August 1870, the Washburn-Langford-Doane Expedition camped near and explored the Tower Fall area for several days en route to Yellowstone Lake. In his 1871 report to Secretary of War Gustavus C. Doane, a member of the expedition described Tower Falls thus:

The great curiosity of the locality, however, is the Tower Fall of Hot Spring Creek, where that stream is precipitated, in one unbroken body, from an amygdaloid ledge, a sheer descent of 115 feet, into a deep gorge, joining the Yellowstone a few hundred yards below. At the crest of the fall the stream has cut its way through amygdaloid masses, leaving tall spires of rock from 50 to 100 feet in height, and worn in every conceivable shape. These are very friable, crumbling under slight pressure; several of them stand like sentinels on the very brink of the fall. A view from the summit of one of these spires is exceedingly beautiful; the clear icy stream plunges from a brink 100 feet beneath to the bottom of the chasm, over 200 feet below, and thence rushes through the narrow gorge, tumbling over boulders and tree trunks fallen in the channel. The sides of the chasm are worn away into caverns lined with variously-tinted mosses, nourished by clouds of spray which rise from the cataract; while above, and to the left, a spur from the great plateau rises above all, with a perpendicular front of 400 feet. The fall is accessible either at the brink or foot, and fine views can be obtained from either side of the cañon. In appearance, they strongly resemble those of the Minnehaha, but are several times as high, and run at least eight times the volume of water. In the basin we found a large petrified log imbedded in the débris. Nothing can be more chastely beautiful than this lovely cascade, hidden away in the dim light of overshadowing rocks and woods, its very voice hushed to a low murmur, unheard at the distance of a few hundred yards. Thousands might pass by within a half mile and not dream of its existence; but once seen, it passes to the list of most pleasant memories. In the afternoon the remainder of the party arrived, having lost the trail on the previous day.

— Gustavus C. Doane

The fall was named by Samuel Hauser, a member of the Washburn party. Hauser made this notation in his diary on August 27, 1870:

Campt [sic] near the most beautiful falls-I ever saw-I named them Tower Falls-from the towers & pinnicle[sic] that overhang them height 115 feet Aug 28-Didnt [sic] move camp Cenery [sic] too beautiful I measured these falls-found them 115-the pinacal [sic] cover top Then 200ft Eight different spires crown from the falls-From below the view is splendid.

— Samuel Hauser

The fall was renamed Tower Fall (singular) by the U.S. Geological Survey in 1928.

A well-known painting by Thomas Moran in 1871 helped persuade Congress to set aside Yellowstone as the world's first national park in 1872.

=== Images of Tower Fall ===
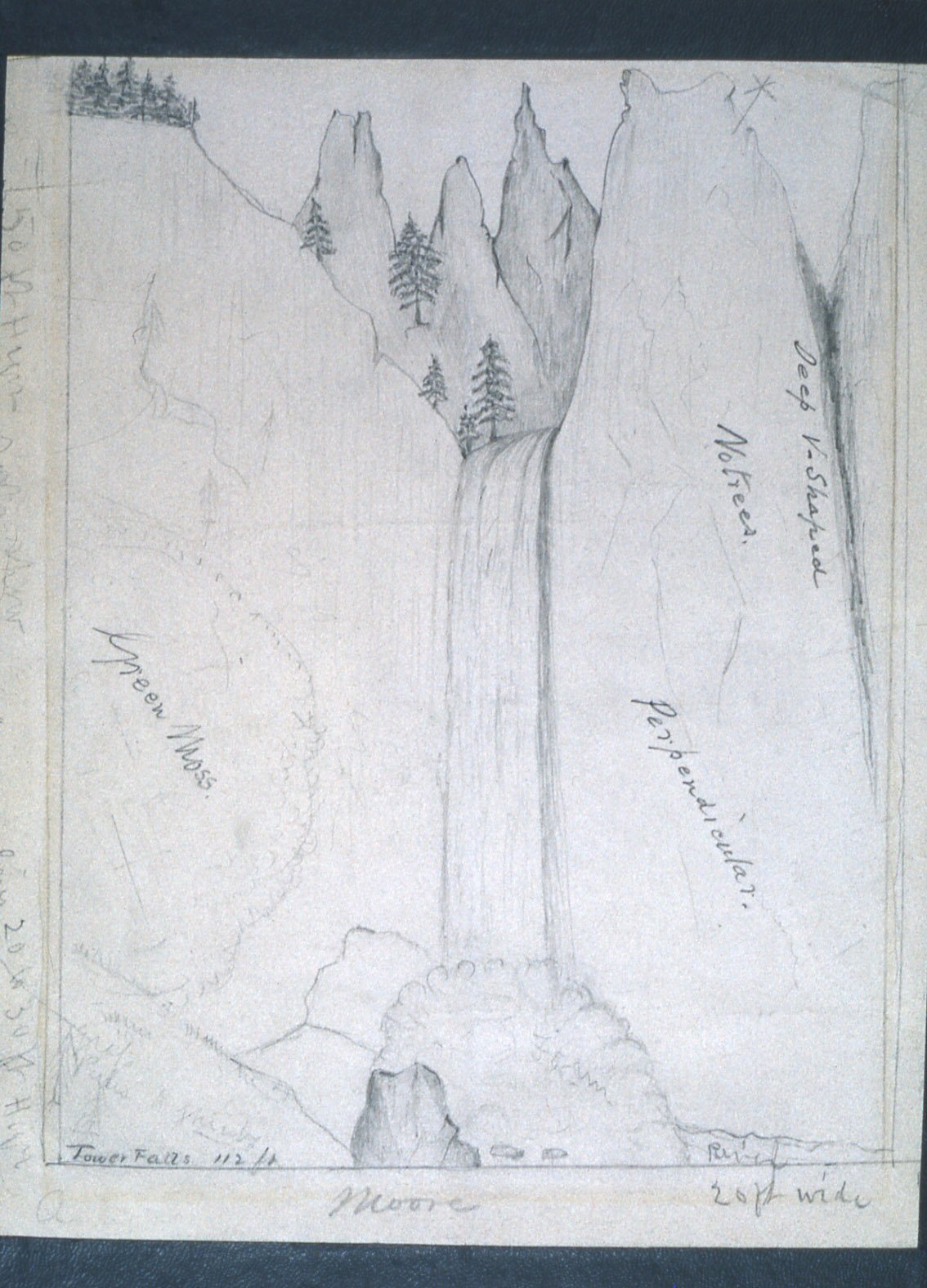
Sketch of Tower Fall by Private Charles Moore, 1870

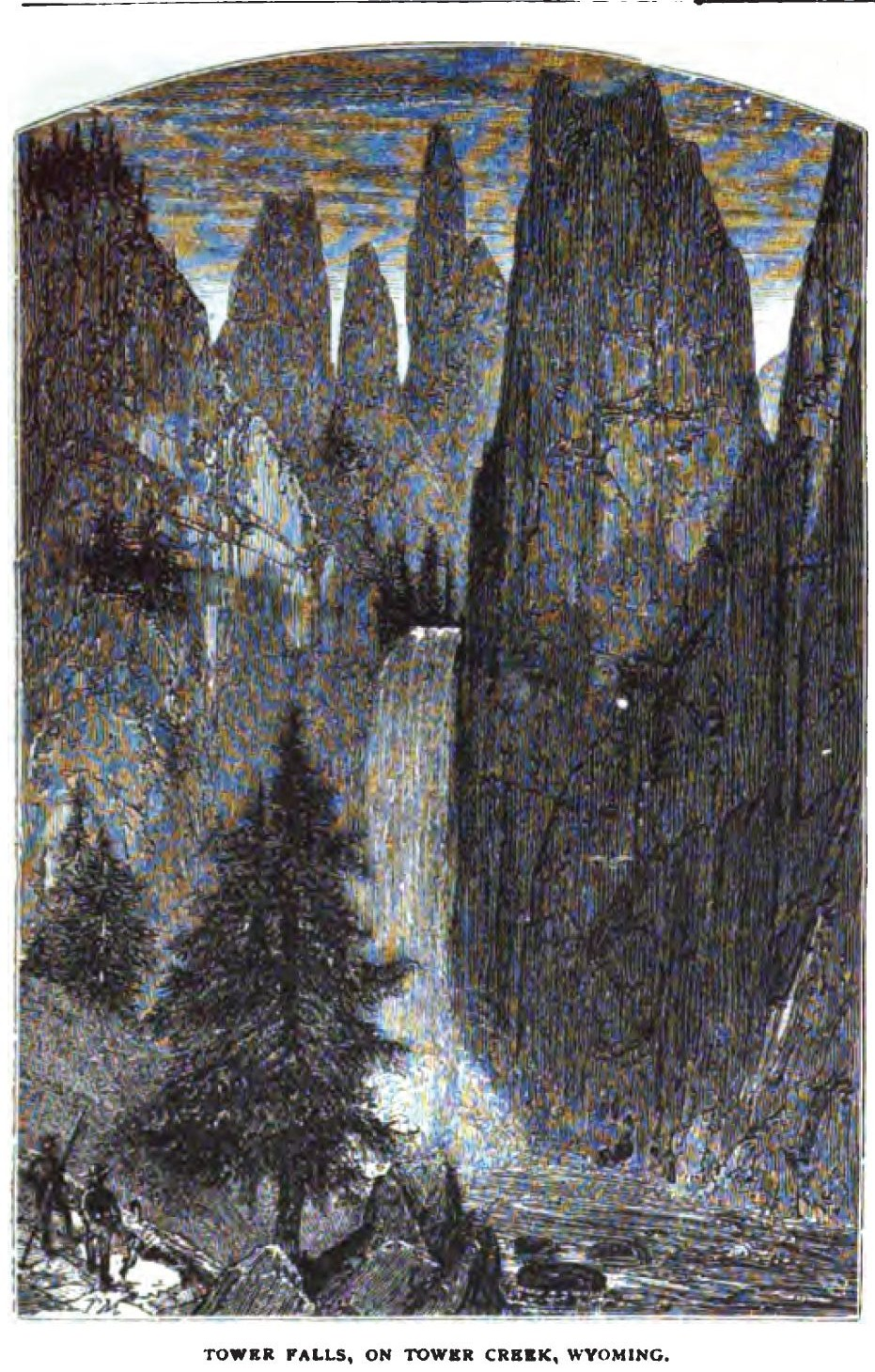
Illustration, 1871

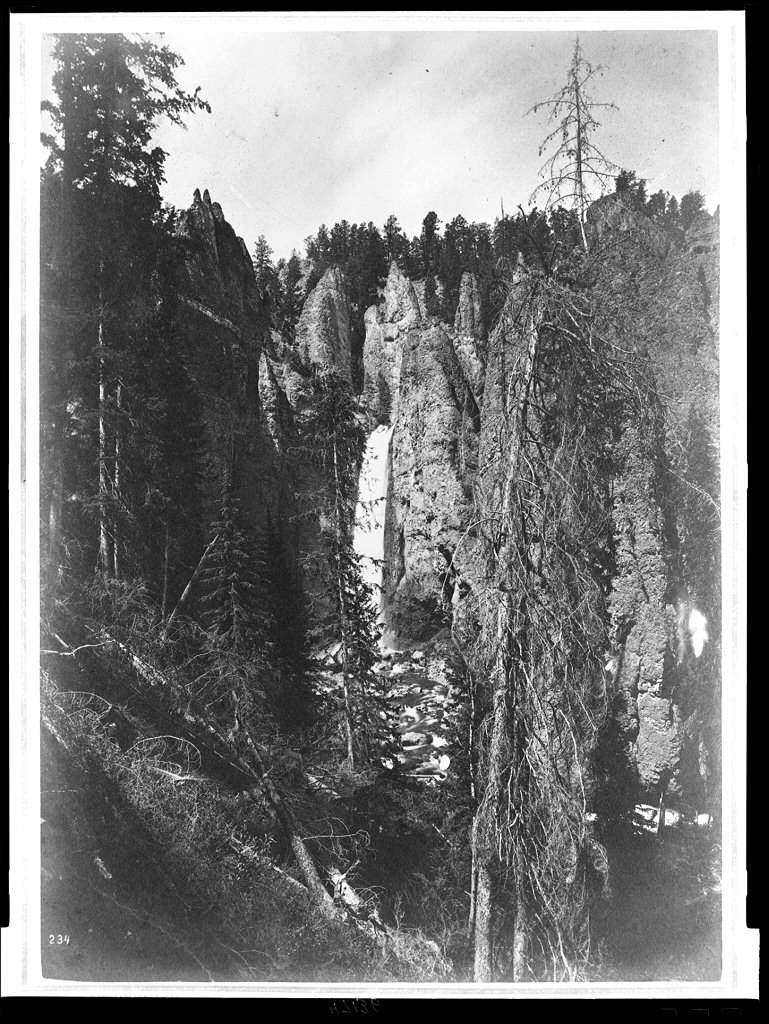
Tower Fall by William Henry Jackson, 1871

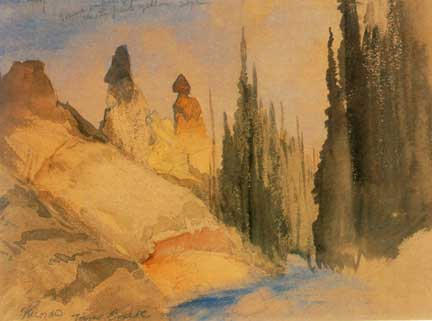
Tower Creek, by Thomas Moran, 1871

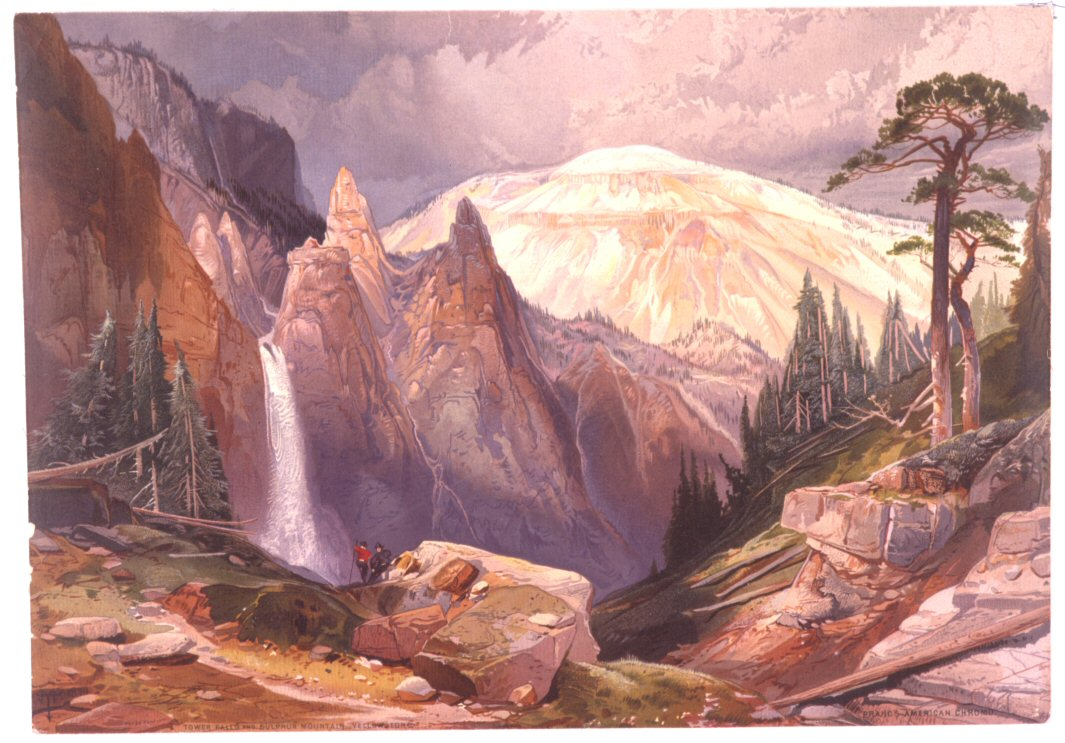
Tower Fall and Sulphur Mountain, Thomas Moran, 1875

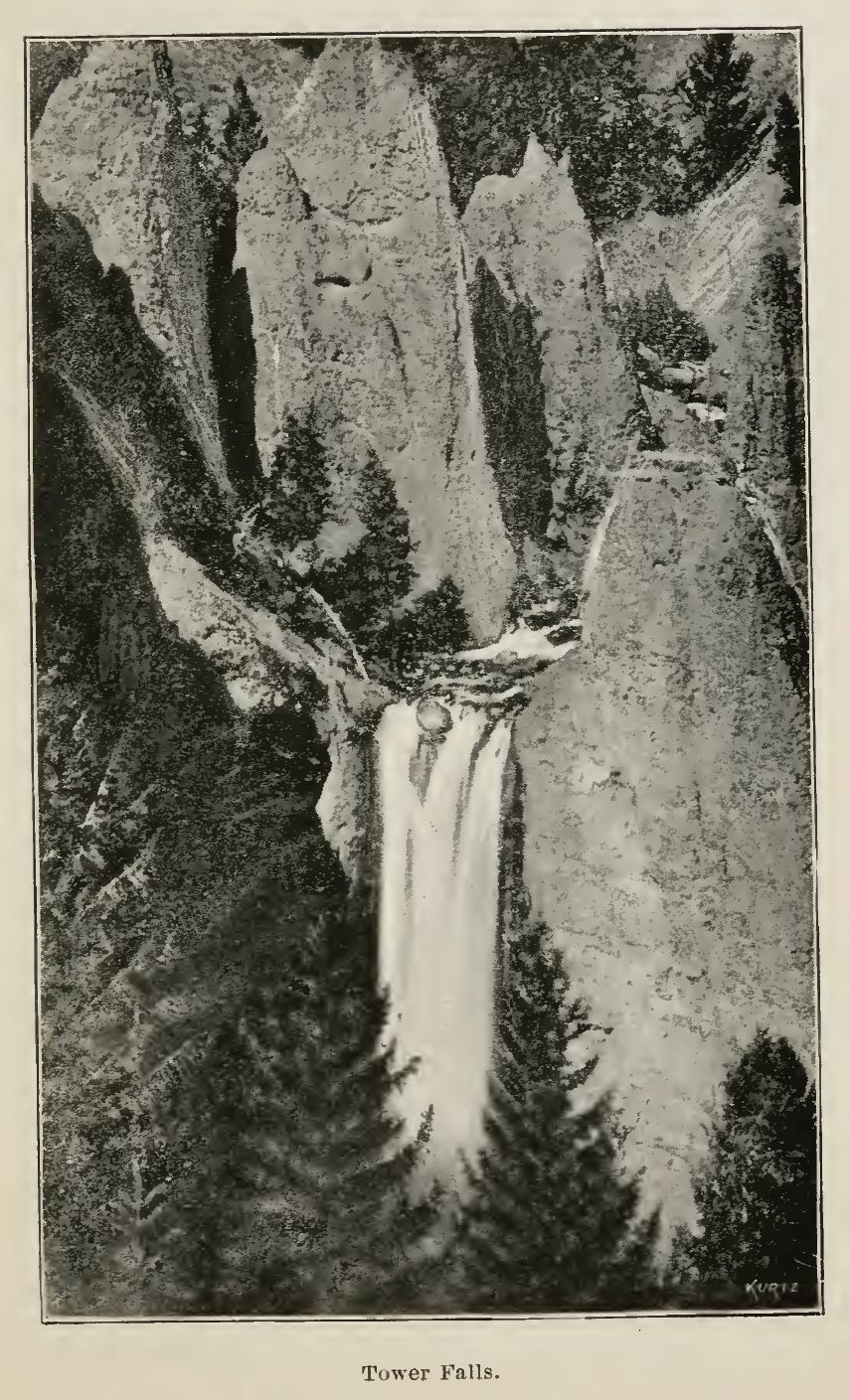
Tower Fall, 1894 by Frank Jay Haynes

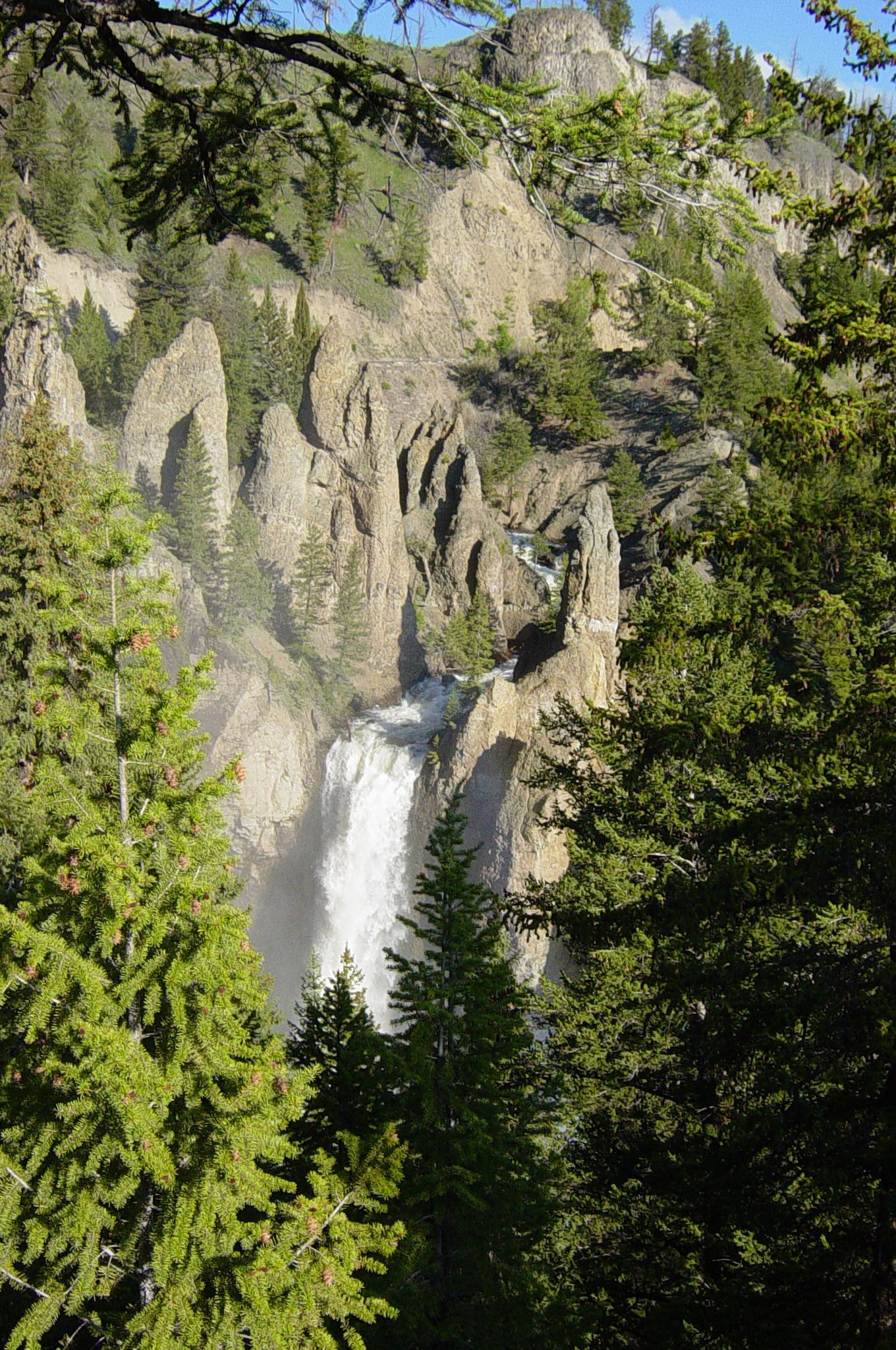
Tower Fall, 2003

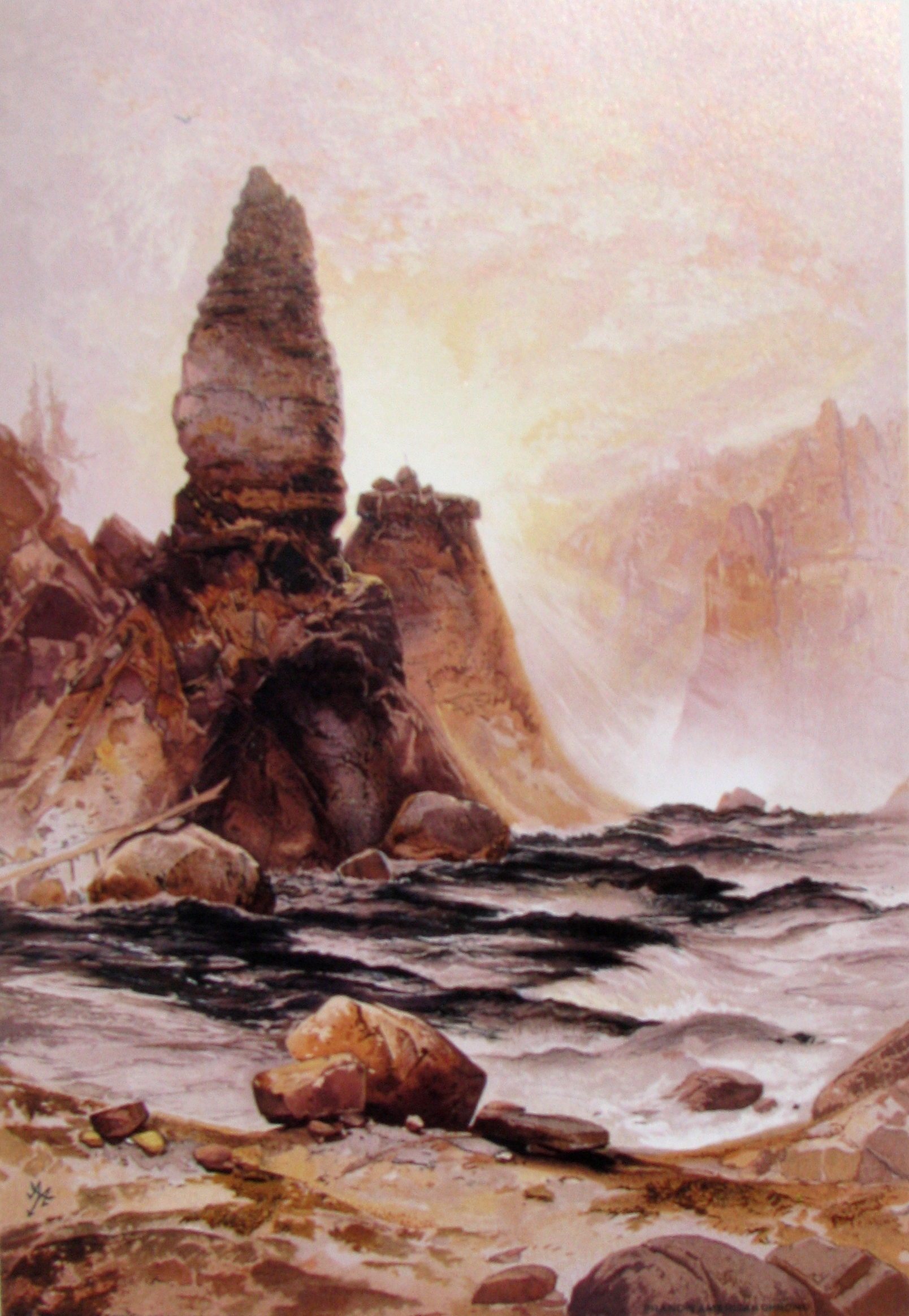
Tower Falls of Yellowstone Thomas Moran

== Climate ==
Climate data for Tower Falls, Wyoming, 1991–2020 normals, 1948-2020 extremes: 6275ft (1913m)
Month	Jan	Feb	Mar	Apr	May	Jun	Jul	Aug	Sep	Oct	Nov	Dec	Year
Record high °F (°C)	55 (13)	58 (14)	65 (18)	77 (25)	86 (30)	95 (35)	98 (37)	97 (36)	93 (34)	83 (28)	66 (19)	53 (12)	98 (37)
Mean maximum °F (°C)	41.5 (5.3)	47.0 (8.3)	56.7 (13.7)	68.0 (20.0)	76.4 (24.7)	83.8 (28.8)	89.8 (32.1)	89.5 (31.9)	85.1 (29.5)	73.8 (23.2)	55.2 (12.9)	43.4 (6.3)	91.2 (32.9)
Mean daily maximum °F (°C)	26.3 (−3.2)	31.1 (−0.5)	40.9 (4.9)	48.8 (9.3)	59.2 (15.1)	68.0 (20.0)	78.4 (25.8)	78.3 (25.7)	68.7 (20.4)	53.0 (11.7)	36.4 (2.4)	25.9 (−3.4)	51.3 (10.7)
Daily mean °F (°C)	15.0 (−9.4)	18.8 (−7.3)	28.2 (−2.1)	36.3 (2.4)	45.3 (7.4)	52.6 (11.4)	59.9 (15.5)	58.8 (14.9)	50.2 (10.1)	38.2 (3.4)	24.5 (−4.2)	15.3 (−9.3)	36.9 (2.7)
Mean daily minimum °F (°C)	3.6 (−15.8)	6.4 (−14.2)	15.6 (−9.1)	23.8 (−4.6)	31.4 (−0.3)	37.2 (2.9)	41.3 (5.2)	39.2 (4.0)	31.6 (−0.2)	23.4 (−4.8)	12.7 (−10.7)	4.7 (−15.2)	22.6 (−5.2)
Mean minimum °F (°C)	−22.5 (−30.3)	−21.7 (−29.8)	−8.7 (−22.6)	6.4 (−14.2)	17.1 (−8.3)	24.7 (−4.1)	31.0 (−0.6)	27.3 (−2.6)	18.1 (−7.7)	5.4 (−14.8)	−9.3 (−22.9)	−20.2 (−29.0)	−29.7 (−34.3)
Record low °F (°C)	−48 (−44)	−42 (−41)	−34 (−37)	−11 (−24)	2 (−17)	12 (−11)	20 (−7)	13 (−11)	3 (−16)	−16 (−27)	−31 (−35)	−49 (−45)	−49 (−45)
Average precipitation inches (mm)	1.13 (29)	0.94 (24)	1.11 (28)	1.43 (36)	1.88 (48)	1.99 (51)	1.31 (33)	1.35 (34)	1.33 (34)	1.52 (39)	1.37 (35)	1.29 (33)	16.65 (424)
Average snowfall inches (cm)	17.80 (45.2)	13.60 (34.5)	12.30 (31.2)	7.80 (19.8)	2.10 (5.3)	0.30 (0.76)	0.0 (0.0)	0.0 (0.0)	0.40 (1.0)	6.00 (15.2)	14.40 (36.6)	19.30 (49.0)	94 (238.56)
Source 1: NOAA
Source 2: XMACIS2 (records & monthly max/mins)

== See also ==
- List of waterfalls
- Waterfalls in Yellowstone National Park
