= Hoyt Peak =

Summit in Yellowstone National Park, Wyoming

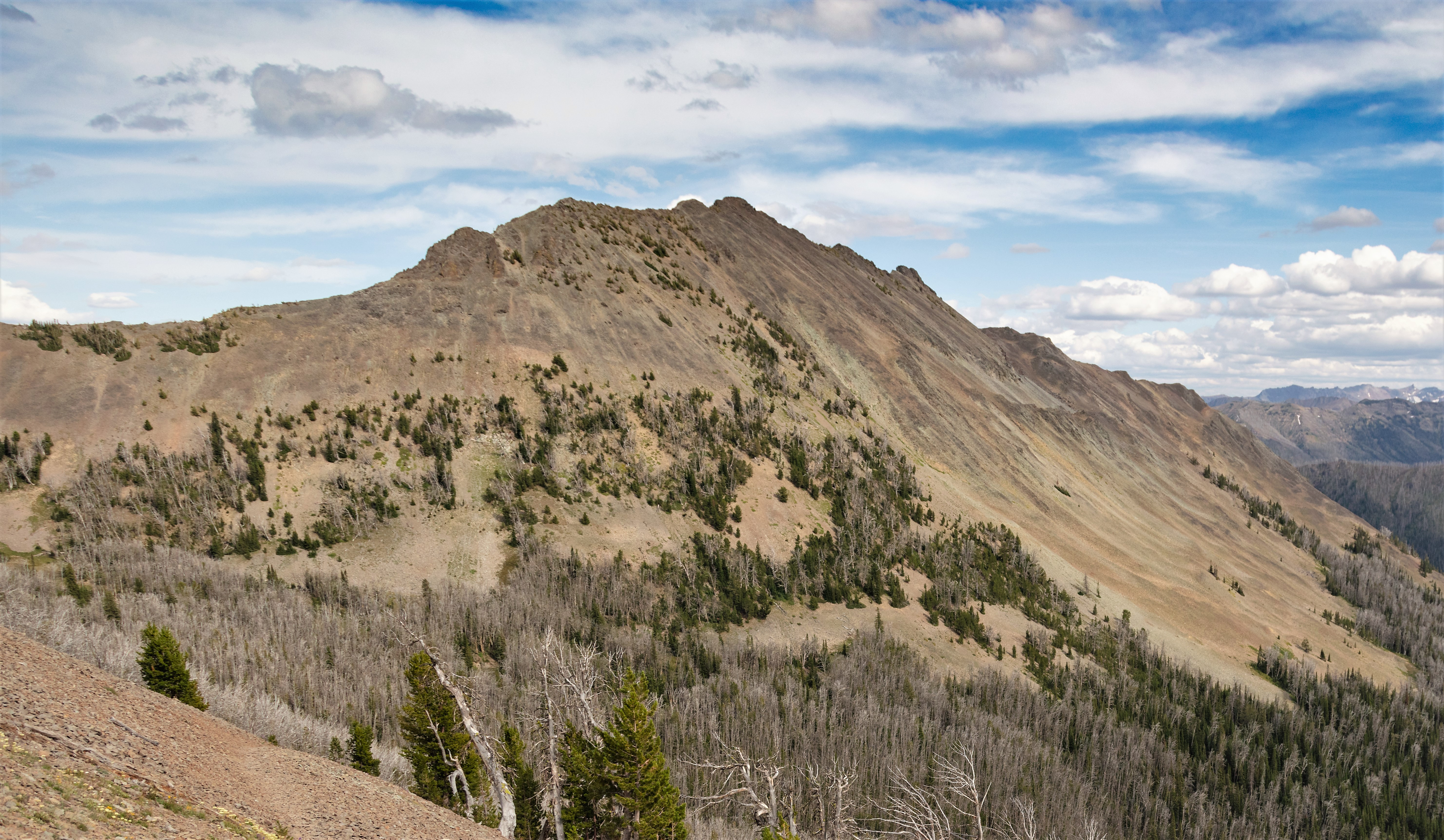
- West aspect, from Avalanche Peak trail

Highest point
- Elevation: 10,506 ft (3,202 m)
- Prominence: 626 ft (191 m)
- Parent peak: Avalanche Peak (10,568 ft)
- Isolation: 1.07 mi (1.72 km)
- Coordinates: 44°28′37″N 110°07′38″W

Naming
- Etymology: John Wesley Hoyt

Geography
- Location within Wyoming Location within the United States
- Location: Yellowstone National Park; Park County, Wyoming, U.S.
- Parent range: Absaroka Range; Rocky Mountains
- Topo map: USGS Sylvan Lake

Climbing
- Easiest route: class 2

Hoyt Peak is a 10,506-foot (3,202 m) summit located on the shared border of Yellowstone National Park and North Absaroka Wilderness, in Park County, Wyoming.

It was named for John Wesley Hoyt (1831–1912), third Governor of Wyoming Territory. The mountain's name was officially adopted in 1895 by the United States Board on Geographic Names.

Sylvan Pass forms the low point of the saddle between Hoyt Peak and Top Notch Peak.

== Climate ==
According to the Köppen climate classification system, Hoyt Peak is located in a subarctic climate zone with long, cold, snowy winters, and mild summers. Winter temperatures can drop below −10 °F with wind chill factors below −30 °F.

== See also ==
- List of mountains and mountain ranges of Yellowstone National Park
