= Mount Langford =

Mountain in Wyoming, United States

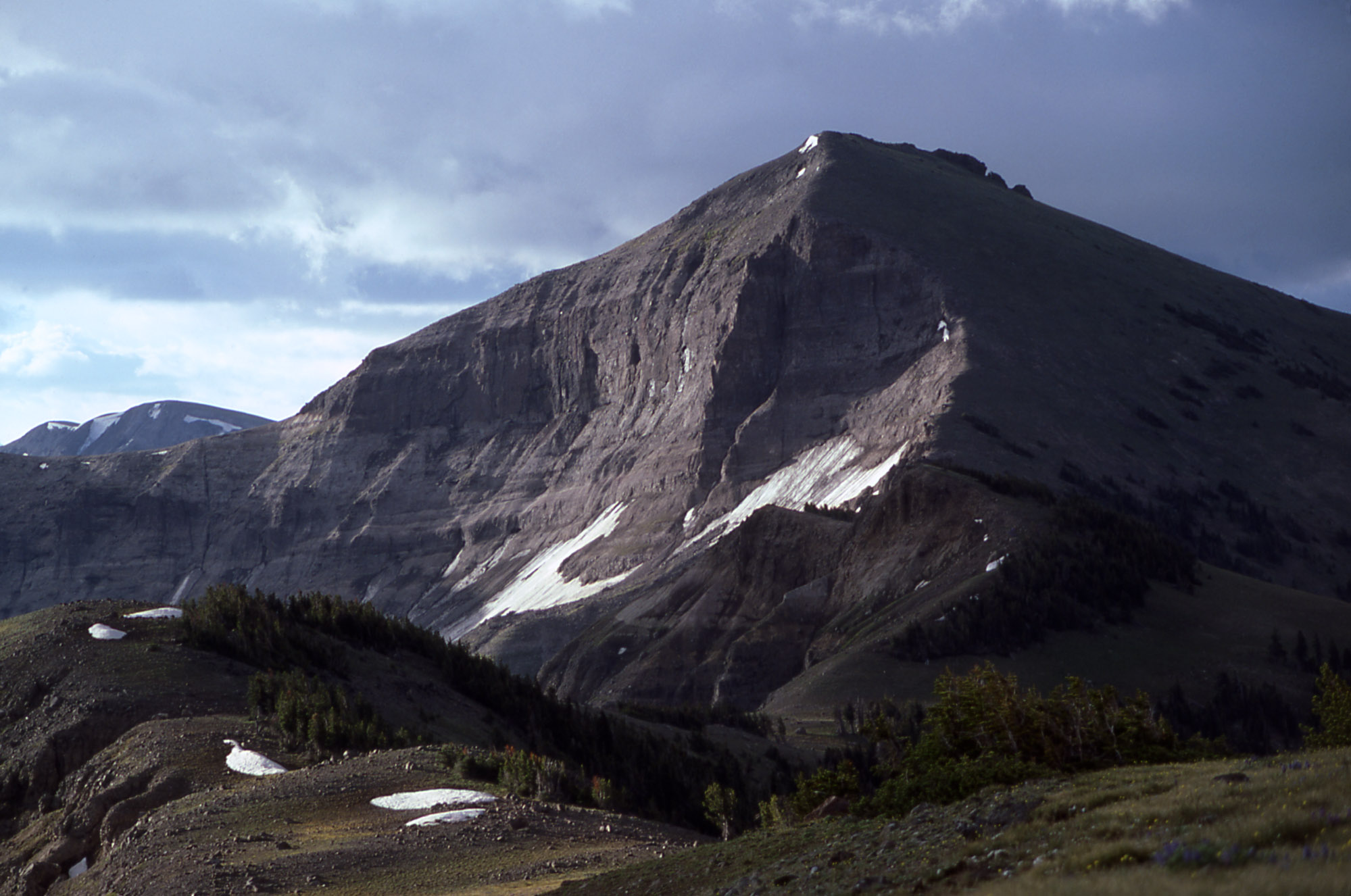
- 1977

Highest point
- Elevation: 10,623 ft (3,238 m)
- Coordinates: 44°24′25″N 110°06′37″W

Geography
- Location within Wyoming
- Location: Yellowstone National Park, Park County, Wyoming
- Parent range: Absaroka Range
- Topo map: Plenty Coups Peak

Mount Langford el. 10,623 feet (3,238 m) is a mountain peak in the Absaroka Range in Yellowstone National Park. The peak is named for Nathaniel P. Langford, the first superintendent of Yellowstone and a leader of the Washburn–Langford–Doane Expedition to Yellowstone in 1870. The expedition and Langford's subsequent promotion in Scribner's helped in the creation of the park in 1872.

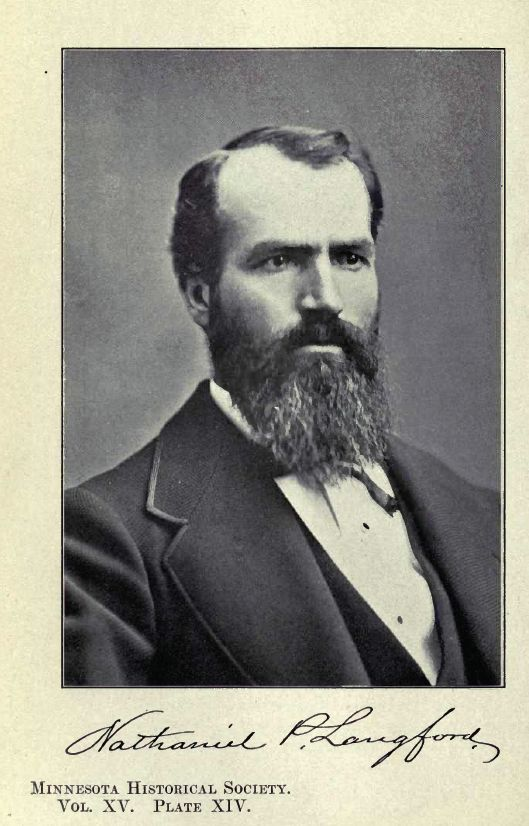
Mount Langford's namesake, Nathaniel P. Langford

On September 7, 1870, the Washburn expedition was camped along the southwestern shore of Yellowstone Lake. That day Langford and Lt. Gustavus Cheyney Doane chose to ascend a nearby peak. From that peak, Langford sketched the first reasonably accurate map of Yellowstone Lake. Upon their return to camp, Henry D. Washburn named the peak they ascended and a nearby secondary peak: Mount Langford and Mount Doane. They are annotated on the map Langford sketched. Langford described the summit with these words:

The view from the summit of this mountain, for wild and rugged grandeur, is surpassed by none I ever before saw. The Yellowstone basin and the Wind river mountains were spread out before us like a map. On the south the eye followed the source of the Yellowstone above the lake, until, twenty-five miles away, it was lost in an immense canon, beyond which two immense jets of vapor rose to a height of probably three hundred feet, indicating that there were other and perhaps greater wonders than those embraced in our prescribed limit of exploration. On the north the outlet of the lake and the steam from the mud geyser and mud volcano were distinctly visible, while on the southeast the view followed to the horizon a succession of lofty peaks and ridges at least thirty miles in width, whose jagged slopes were filled with yawning caverns, pine-embowered recesses and beetling precipices, some hundreds and some thousands of feet in height ... Lieutenant Doane and I were somewhat fatigued with our climb of four hours' duration, and we refreshed ourselves with such creature comforts as we found on the summit; but, although we attained the "crest," we did not discern any "free and generous spirit," save that which we saw "through a glass darkly."

— Nathaniel P. Langford, 1870

During the Hayden Geological Survey of 1871, Hayden, for unknown reasons, moved the names of Mount Langford and Doane to peaks farther north. The original Mount Langford remained unnamed until 1885 when Arnold Hague named it Colter Peak.

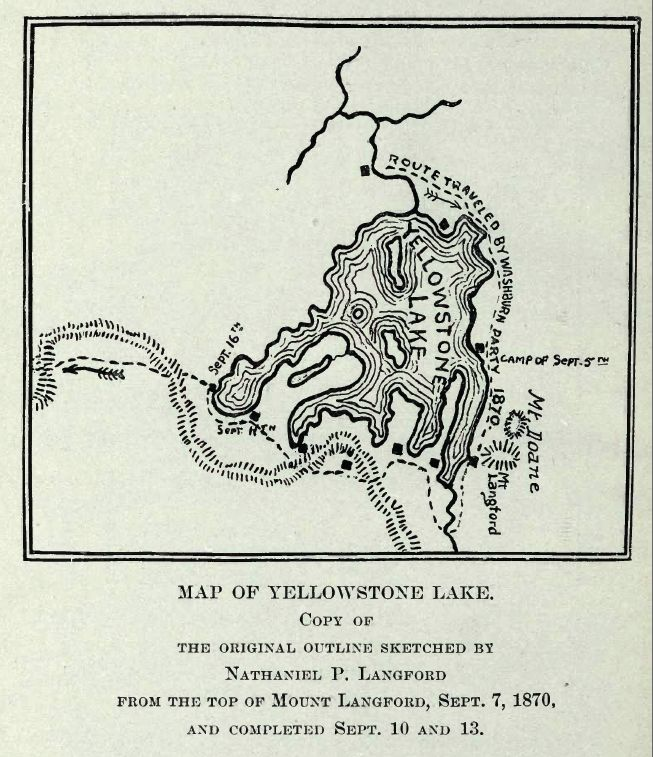
Map of Yellowstone Lake, sketched by Langford in 1870

== See also ==
- Mountains and mountain ranges of Yellowstone National Park
