= Top Notch Peak =

Mountain in Wyoming, United States

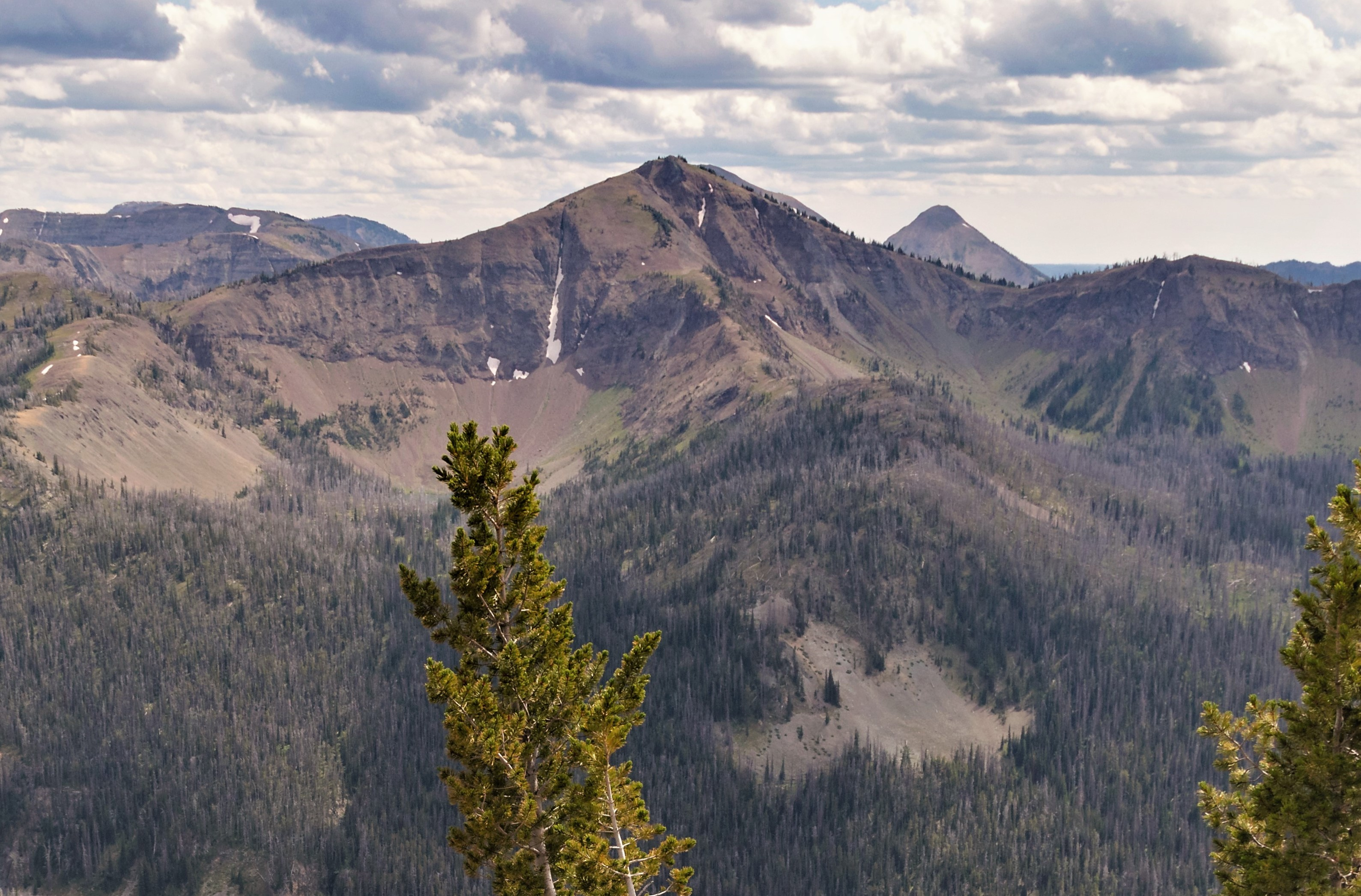
- North aspect, seen from Avalanche Peak trail

Highest point
- Elevation: 10,245 ft (3,123 m)
- Prominence: 805 ft (245 m)
- Parent peak: Hoyt Peak (10,506 ft)
- Isolation: 1.91 mi (3.07 km)
- Coordinates: 44°27′07″N 110°08′35″W

Geography
- Location within Wyoming Location within the United States
- Location: Yellowstone National Park; Park County, Wyoming, U.S.
- Parent range: Absaroka Range; Rocky Mountains
- Topo map: USGS Sylvan Lake

Top Notch Peak is a 10,245-foot-elevation (3,123-meter) mountain summit located in Yellowstone National Park, in Park County, Wyoming, United States.

== Description ==
The peak is situated immediately southwest of Sylvan Pass, and 7 miles (11 km) west of the park's east entrance. It is the 43rd-highest peak within the park. It is part of the Absaroka Range, which is a subset of the Rocky Mountains. Neighbors include Hoyt Peak 1.9 miles (3.1 km) across the opposite side of Sylvan Pass, Avalanche Peak 2.6 miles (4.2 km) to the north, and Mount Doane 2.67 miles (4.30 km) to the south. The mountain's name was officially adopted in 1930 by the United States Board on Geographic Names. The descriptive name refers to a deep notch near the summit which is apparent from the park road at Sylvan Lake. On August 22, 1970, Dr. Dean Jack Tiller, his wife, daughter, and son-in-law were killed when their small plane crashed into the east face of the peak.

== Climate ==
According to the Köppen climate classification system, Top Notch Peak is located in a subarctic climate zone with long, cold, snowy winters, and cool to warm summers. Winter temperatures can drop below −10 °F with wind chill factors below −30 °F. Precipitation runoff from the mountain drains to Yellowstone Lake six miles to the west.

== Gallery ==
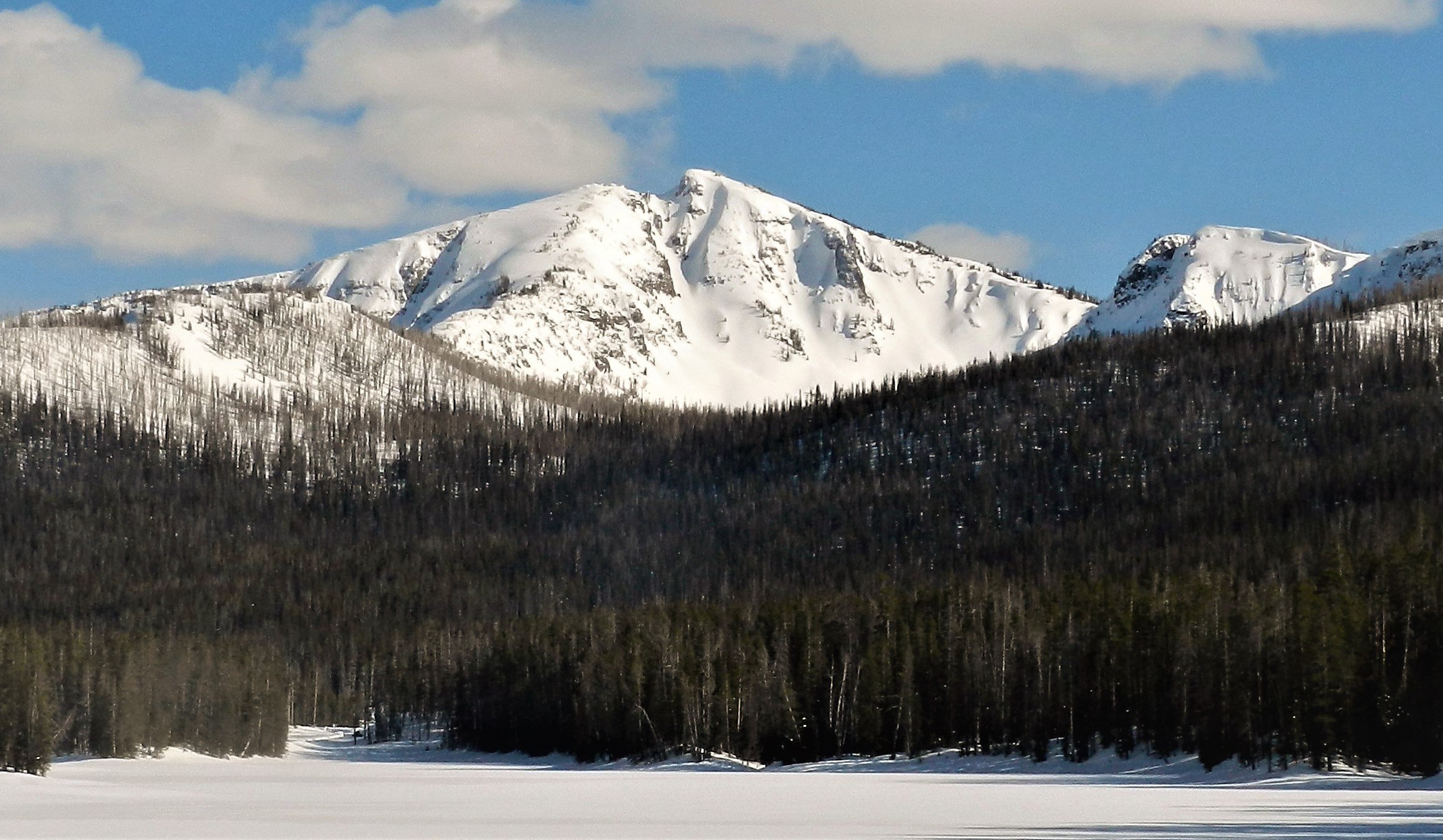
Top Notch Peak from Sylvan Lake

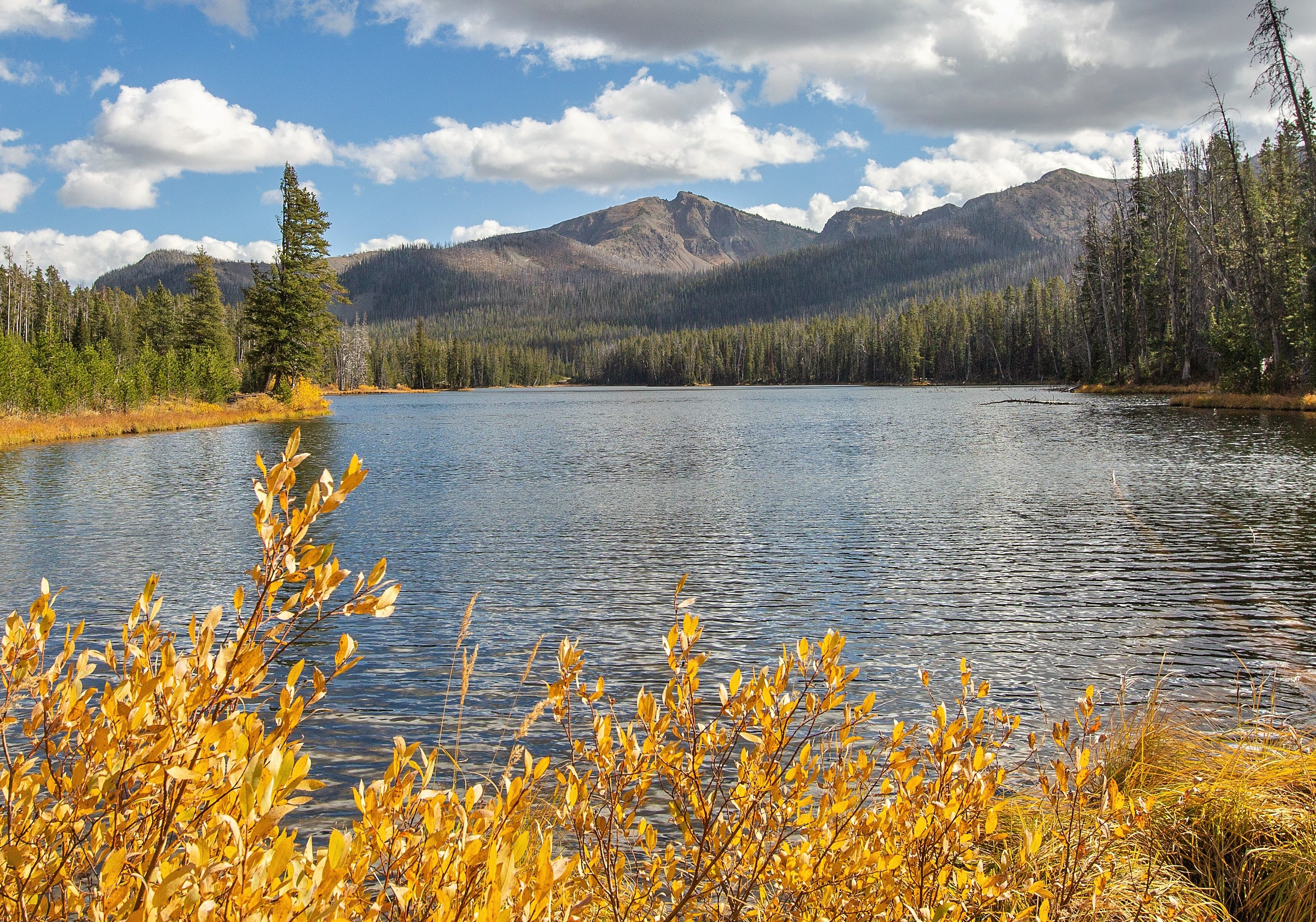
Top Notch Peak from Sylvan Lake

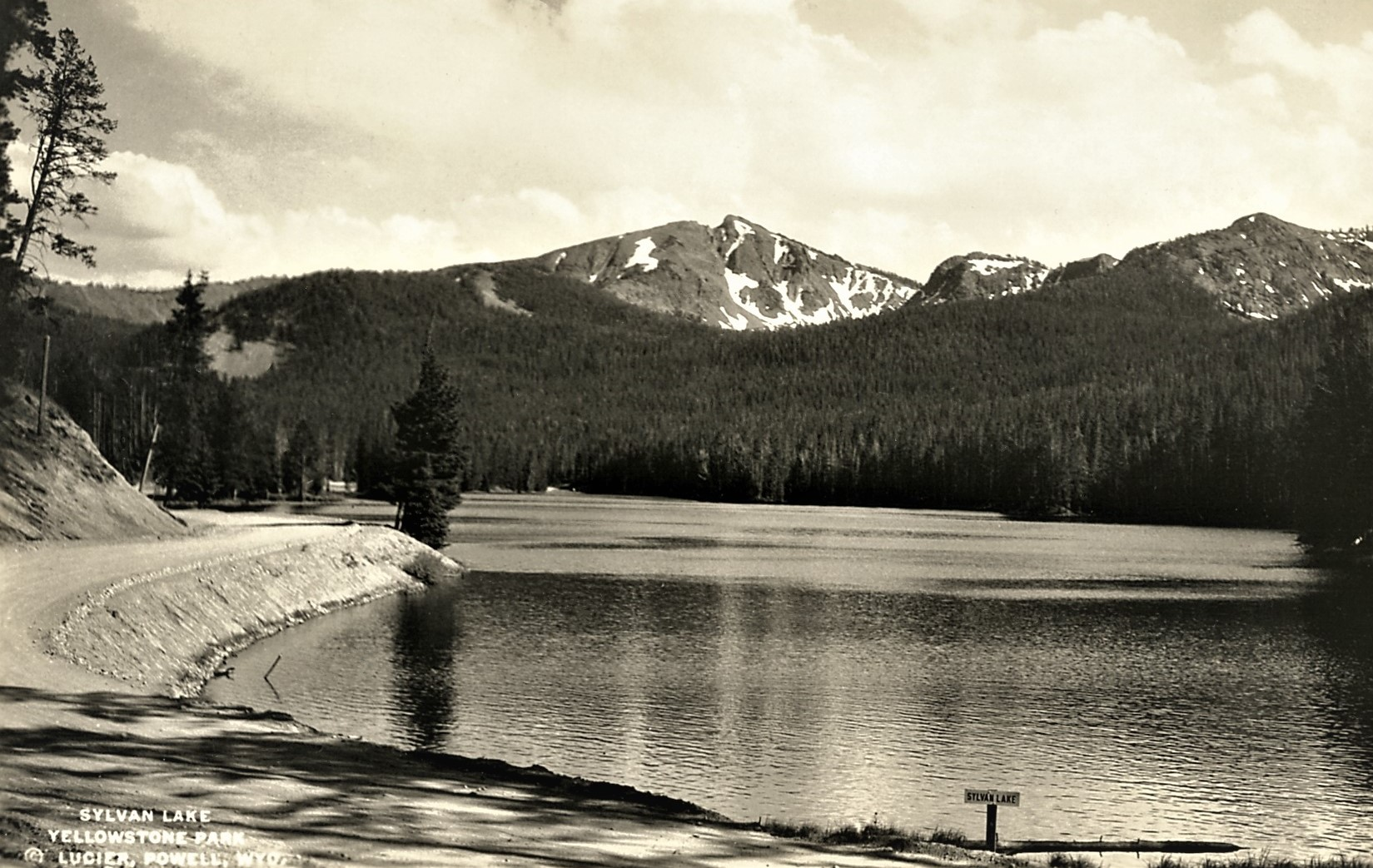
Top Notch Peak and Sylvan Lake, circa 1930

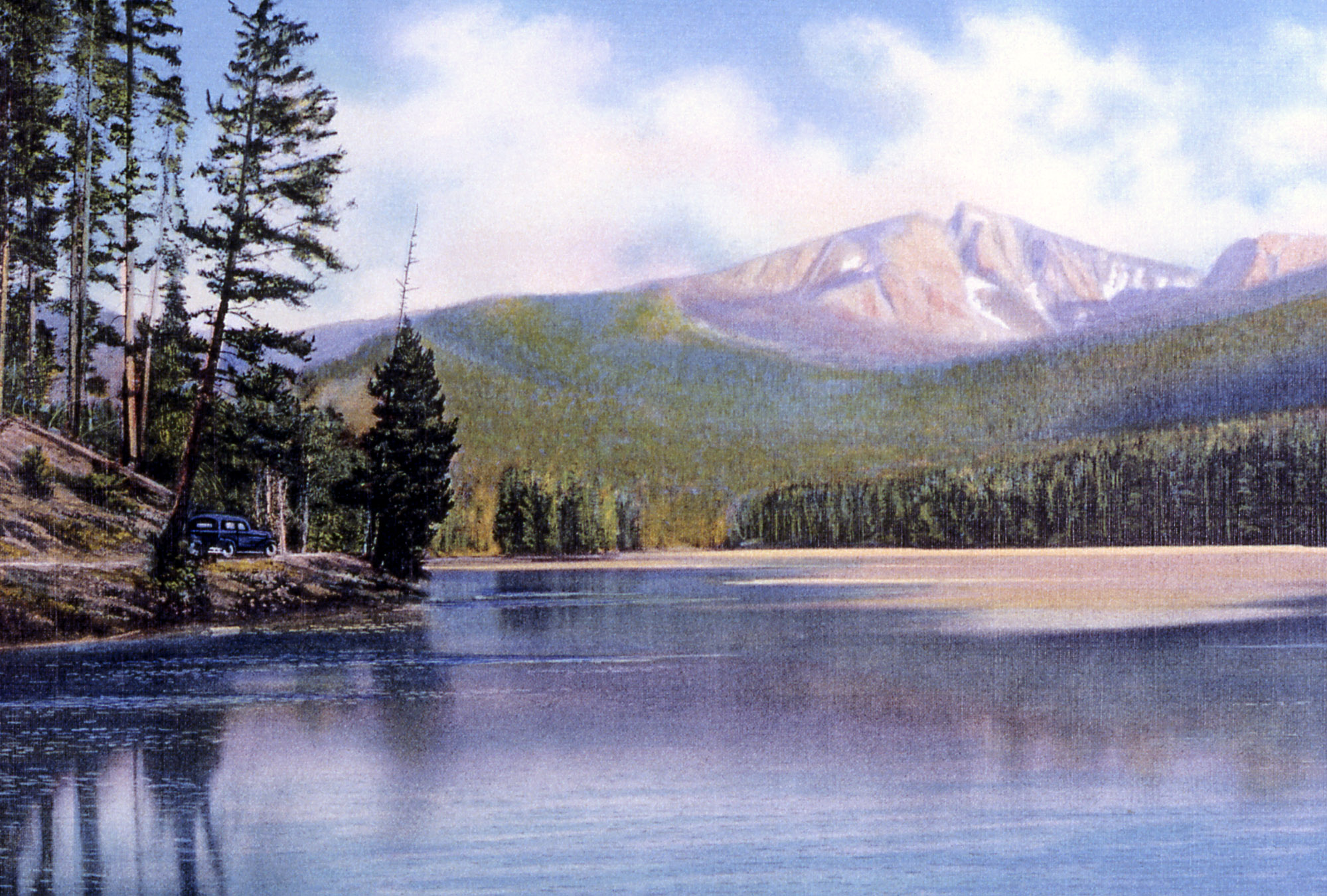
Postcard circa 1920

== See also ==
- List of mountains and mountain ranges of Yellowstone National Park
