= Avalanche Peak (Wyoming) =

Mountain

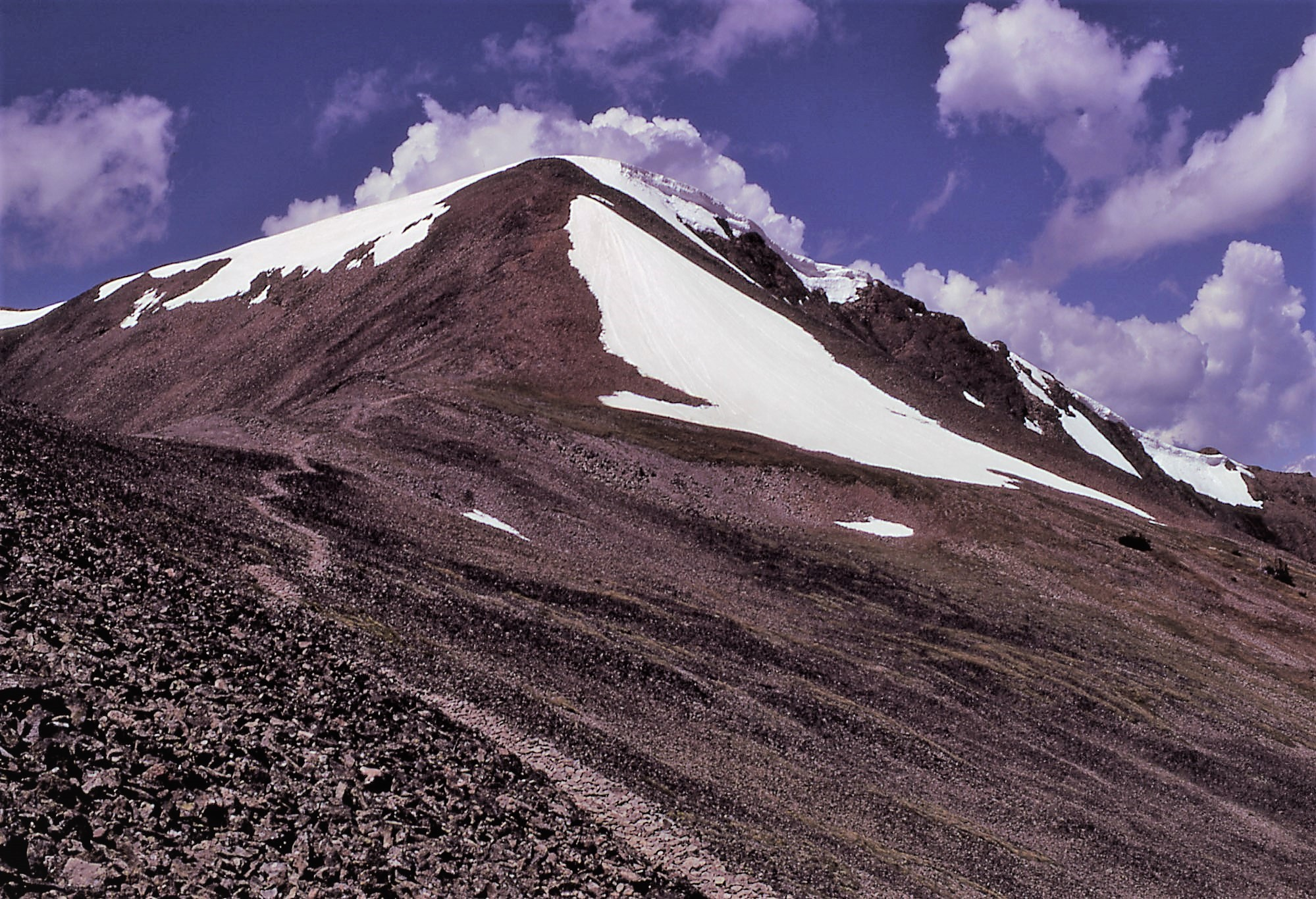

Highest point
- Elevation: 10,568 ft (3,221 m)
- Prominence: 1,008 ft (307 m)
- Parent peak: Silvertip Peak (10,645 ft)
- Isolation: 2.99 mi (4.81 km)
- Coordinates: 44°29′22″N 110°08′24″W

Geography
- Location within Wyoming Location within the United States
- Location: Yellowstone National Park; Park County, Wyoming, U.S.
- Parent range: Absaroka Range; Rocky Mountains
- Topo map: USGS Sylvan Lake

Climbing
- Easiest route: Trail

Avalanche Peak is a 10,568-foot (3,221 m) summit located on the shared border of Yellowstone National Park and North Absaroka Wilderness, in Park County, Wyoming. It is part of the Absaroka Range. It features a large bowl covered in scree and is popular with hikers for its view of Yellowstone Lake and the surrounding area. The mountain's name was officially adopted in 1930 by the United States Board on Geographic Names.

== Climate ==
According to the Köppen climate classification system, Avalanche Peak is located in a subarctic climate zone with long, cold, snowy winters, and mild summers. Winter temperatures can drop below −10 °F with wind chill factors below −30 °F.

== Gallery ==
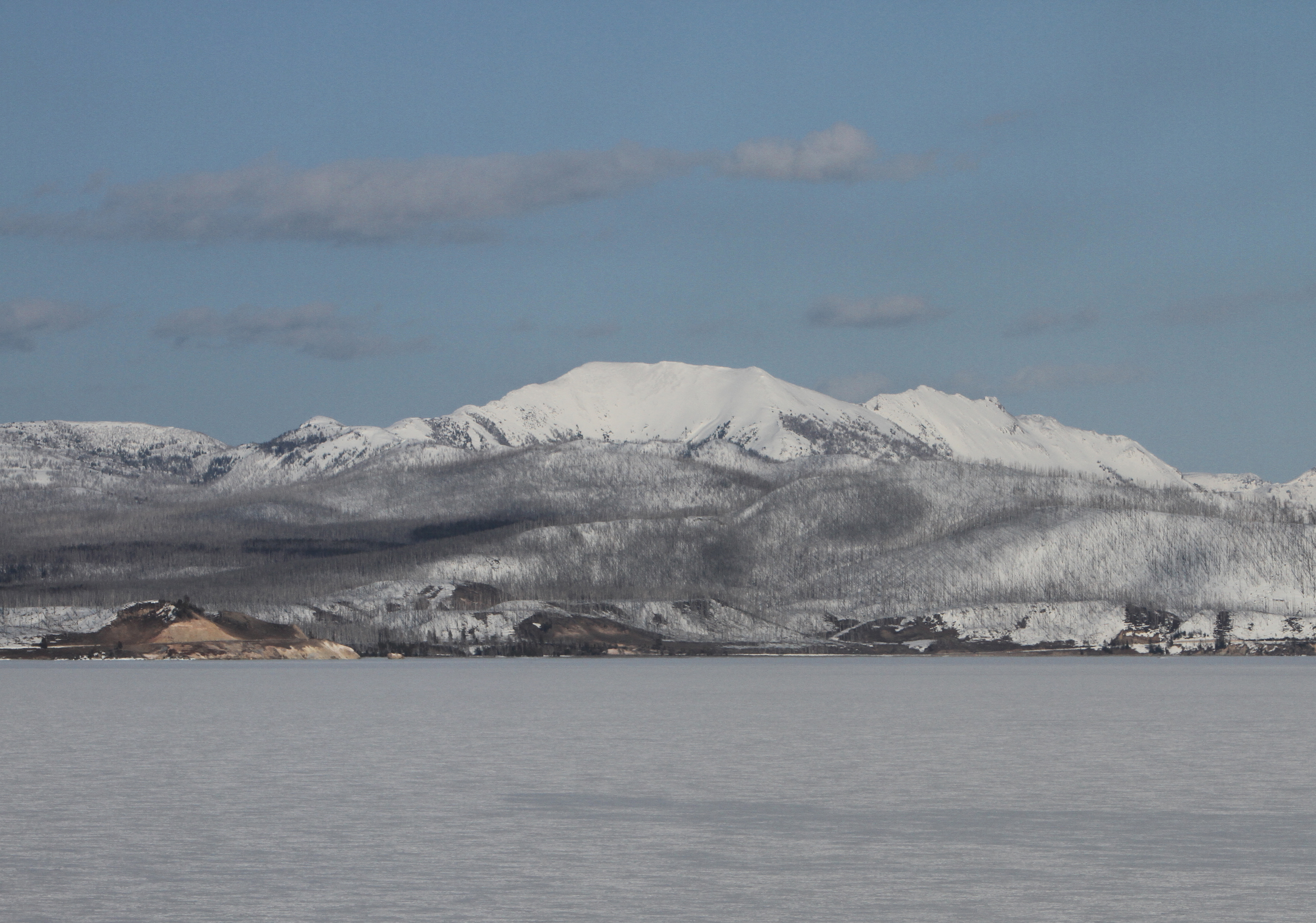
Avalanche Peak across Yellowstone Lake

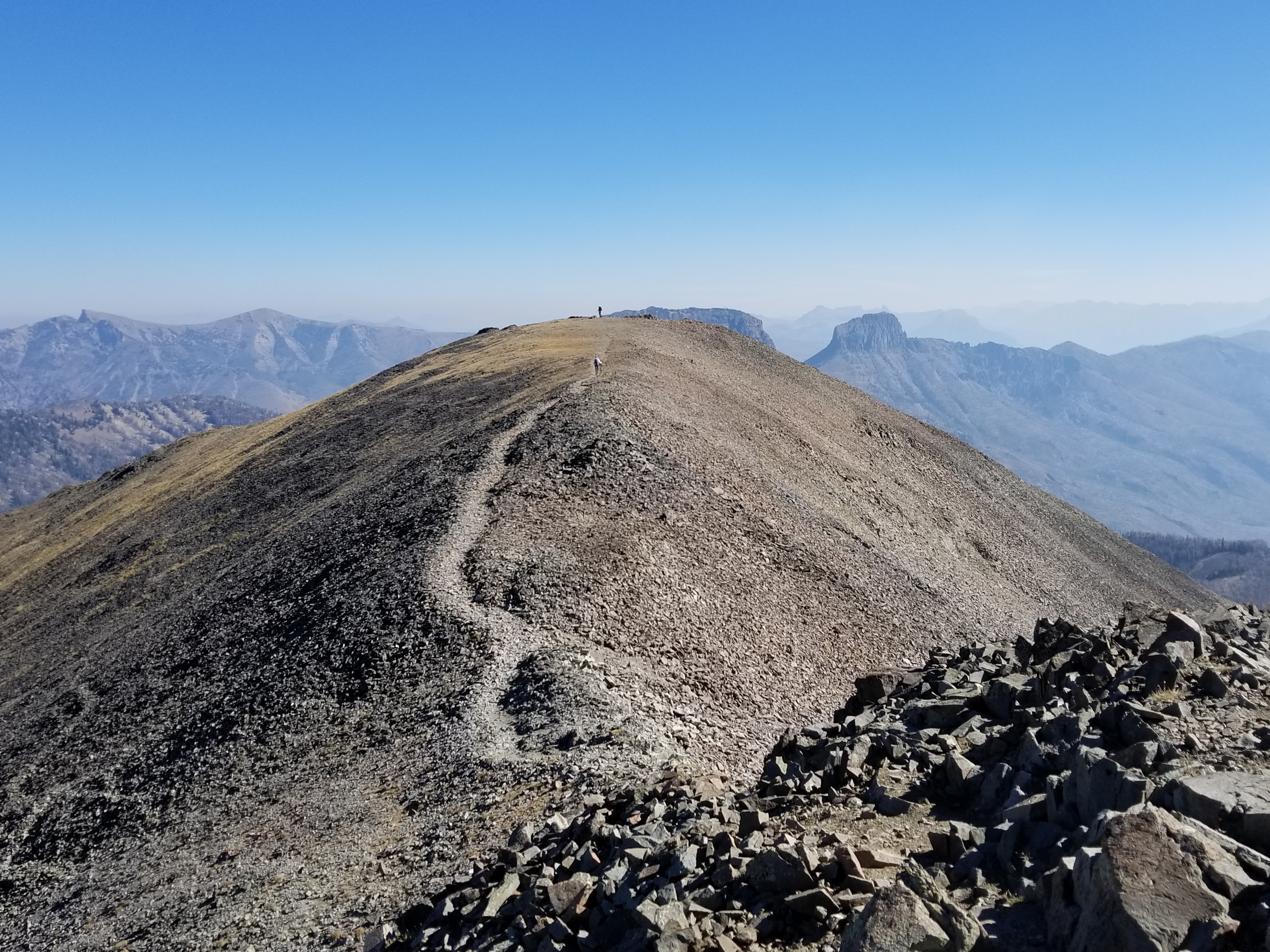
Summit of Avalanche Peak

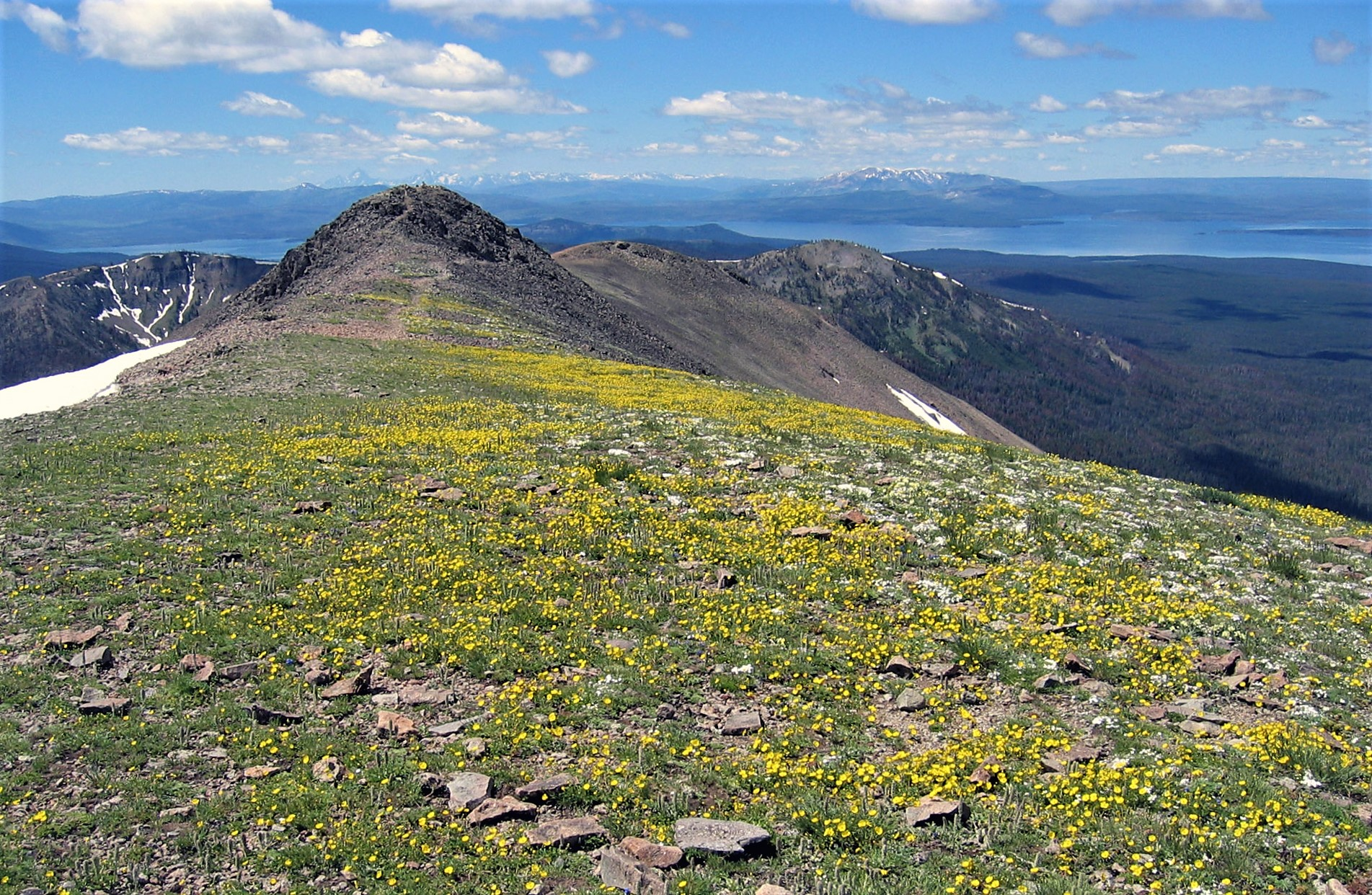
Summit of Avalanche Peak

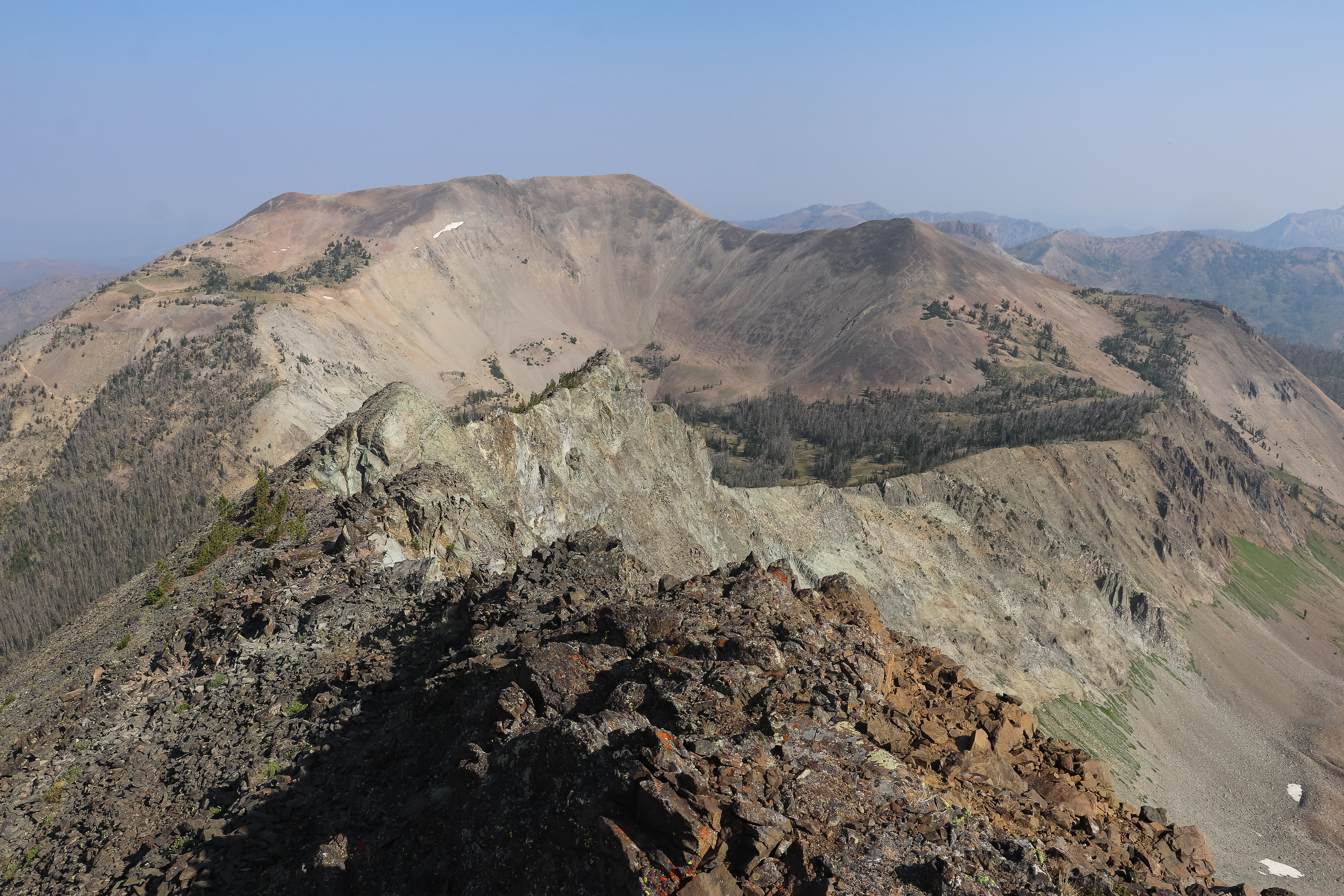
Avalanche Peak viewed from Hoyt Peak

== See also ==
- List of mountains and mountain ranges of Yellowstone National Park
