= Sylvan Pass =

Sylvan Pass may be one of the following:

== Mountain passes ==
- Sylvan Pass (British Columbia) – a pass in British Columbia, Canada
- Sylvan Pass (Wyoming) – a pass in Yellowstone National Park, Wyoming, United States
