= Silvertip Peak (Wyoming) =

Mountain in Wyoming, US

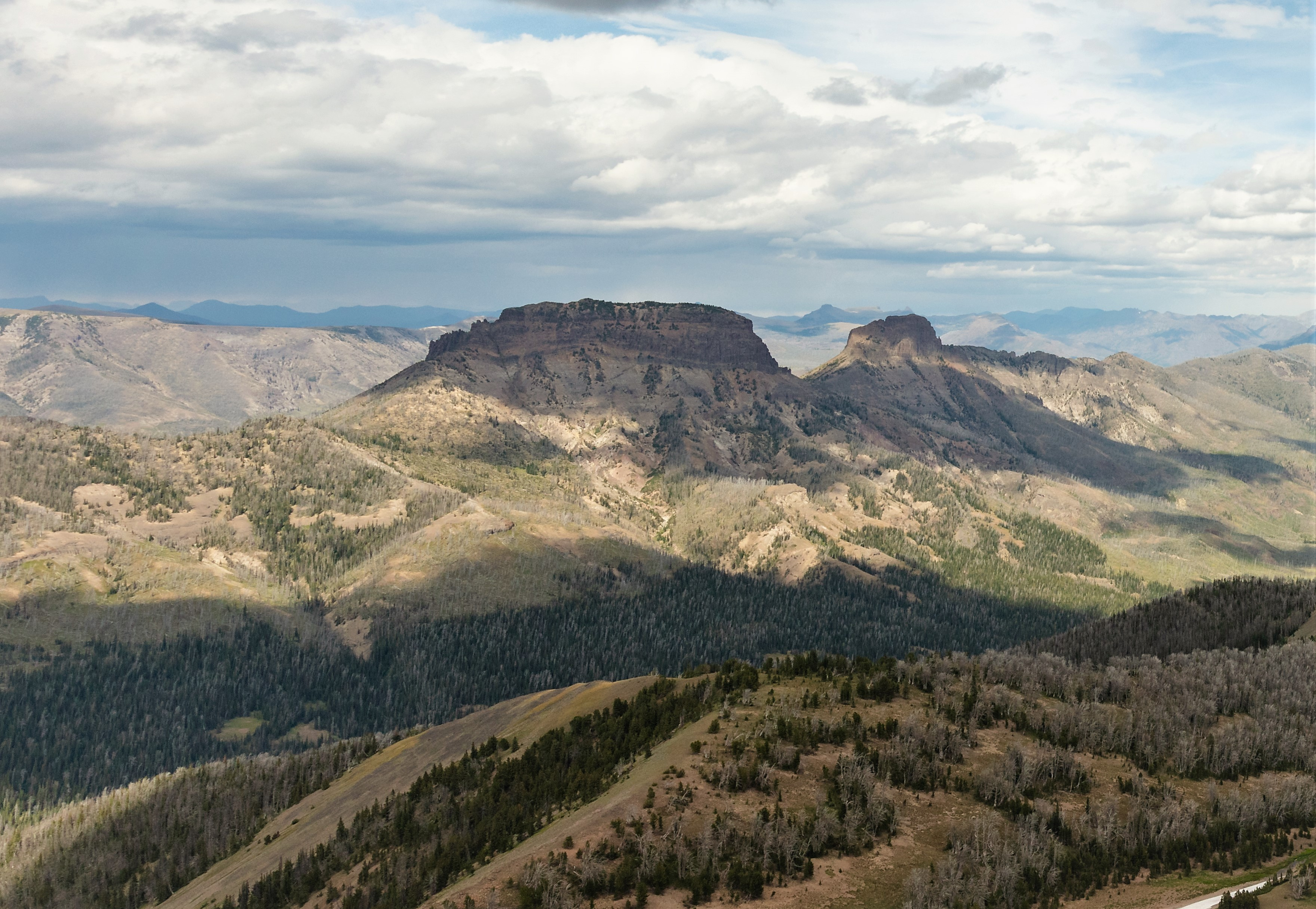
- Southwest aspect, viewed from Avalanche Peak

Highest point
- Elevation: 10,645 ft (3,245 m)
- Prominence: 1,365 ft (416 m)
- Parent peak: Cathedral Peak (10,765 ft)
- Isolation: 3.24 mi (5.21 km)
- Coordinates: 44°31′26″N 110°06′11″W

Naming
- Etymology: Silvertip bear

Geography
- Location within Wyoming Location within the United States
- Location: Park County, Wyoming, U.S.
- Parent range: Absaroka Range; Rocky Mountains
- Topo map: USGS Cathedral Peak

Climbing
- Easiest route: class 2

Silvertip Peak is a 10,645-foot-elevation (3,245-meter) mountain summit located in Park County, Wyoming, United States.

== Description ==
Silvertip Peak is part of the Absaroka Range, and is within the North Absaroka Wilderness, on land managed by Shoshone National Forest. The peak is situated approximately eight miles east of Yellowstone Lake, and two miles outside the boundary of Yellowstone National Park. Topographic relief is significant as the north aspect rises 2,850 feet (870 meters) above Jones Creek in one mile. The mountain's name was officially adopted in 1930 by the United States Board on Geographic Names.

== Climate ==
According to the Köppen climate classification system, Silvertip Peak has an alpine subarctic climate with long, cold, snowy winters, and cool to warm summers. Winter temperatures can drop below −10 °F with wind chill factors below −30 °F. Precipitation runoff from the mountain drains into Jones Creek and Crow Creek, which are tributaries of the North Fork Shoshone River.

== See also ==
- List of mountain peaks of Wyoming
