= Colter Peak =

Mountain in the state of Wyoming

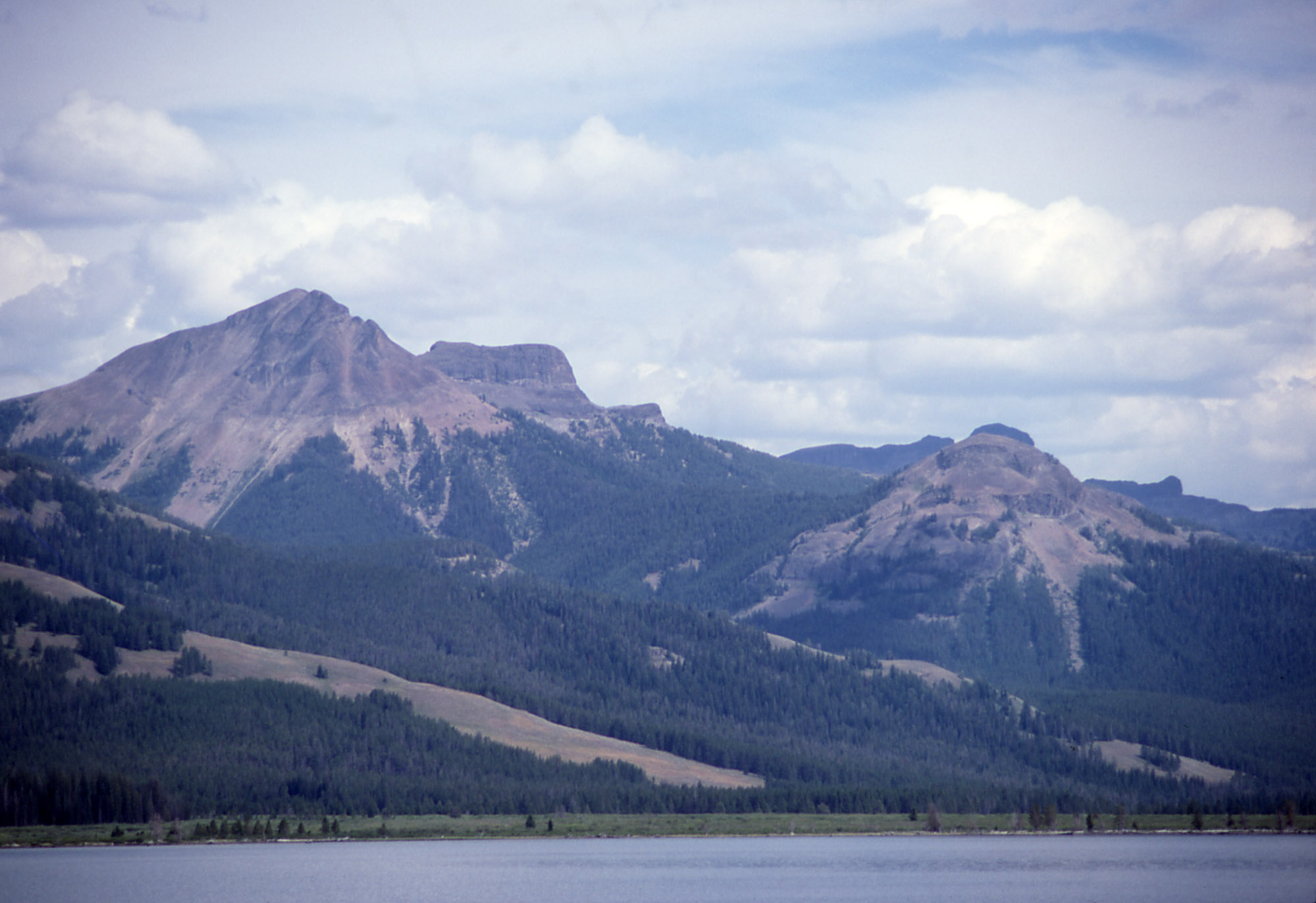
- Colter Peak and Turret Mountain

Highest point
- Elevation: 10,640 ft (3,240 m)
- Coordinates: 44°18′06″N 110°06′36″W

Geography
- Location within Wyoming
- Location: Yellowstone National Park, Park County, Wyoming
- Parent range: Absaroka Range
- Topo map: Eagle Peak

Colter Peak el. 10,640 feet (3,240 m) is a mountain peak in the Absaroka Range in the southeastern section of Yellowstone National Park. The peak is named for mountain man John Colter, reputedly the first white man to visit the Yellowstone region. Colter Peak was first ascended in 1870 by Lt. Gustavus Cheyney Doane and Nathaniel P. Langford during the Washburn–Langford–Doane Expedition. Henry D. Washburn, the expedition leader named the peak for Langford and Doane. For unknown reasons, geologist Ferdinand V. Hayden moved those names to peaks farther north in 1871 during the Hayden Geological Survey of 1871. In 1888, Philetus Norris the second park superintendent, named the peak Mount Forum for unknown reasons. In 1885, geologist Arnold Hague gave the peak its official name: Colter Peak.

The first detailed map of Yellowstone Lake was sketched by Langford from this peak on September 7, 1870.

Doane's account of his and Langford's ascent into the Absaroka Range (The peak ascended is today's Colter Peak):

Seventeenth day -- September 7. -- In company with Mr. Langford, I climbed to the summit of a neighboring peak, the highest of the east range. We were four hours reaching the highest point, climbing for over a mile over shelly, feldspathic granite, after leaving our horses at the limit of pines.

Summit at noon, barometer, 20.35; thermometer, 65°; elevation, 10,327 feet.

The view from this peak commanded completely the lake, enabling us to sketch a map of its inlets and bearings with considerable accuracy. On the southwestern portion of the lake rose a high mountain of a yellow rock, forming a divide or water-shed in the center of the great basin, beyond which the waters flowed south and west. The stream we failed in crossing on the previous day rises in the southeast range, running east several miles, and joining another stream from the southwest at Bridger's Lake, a sheet of water about two miles in diameter, at the foot of a rocky peak about twenty-five miles to the south, from whence the stream flows due north, in a straight valley, to the Yellowstone Lake. This valley has a uniform width of about three miles, is level and swampy through its whole extent, with numerous lakelets of considerable size scattered at intervals over its surface. South of Bridger's Lake, and beyond the Snake River divide, were seen two vast columns of vapor, thirty miles away, which rose at least 500 feet above the tops of the hills. These were twenty times as large as any we had previously seen, but lay a long distance out of our course, and were not visited. Looking east, one mountain succeeds another, with precipitous ravines, volcanic, rugged, and in many places impassable, as if all the fusible portions of the mountains had melted and run away, leaving a vast cinder behind. There were no ranges of peaks; it was a great level plain of summits, with the softer portions melted out, the elevations all coming up to the same level, and capped with horizontal beds of surface lava. This formation extended to the limit of vision. The deep and narrow valleys were grassed and timbered, had sparkling streams, and furnished basins for numbers of small lakes; in fact, there are lakes here everywhere, on the summits of the mountains and on their terraced slopes, in valleys and in ravines, of all sizes, shapes, and qualities of water.

— Gustavus C. Doane, 1871

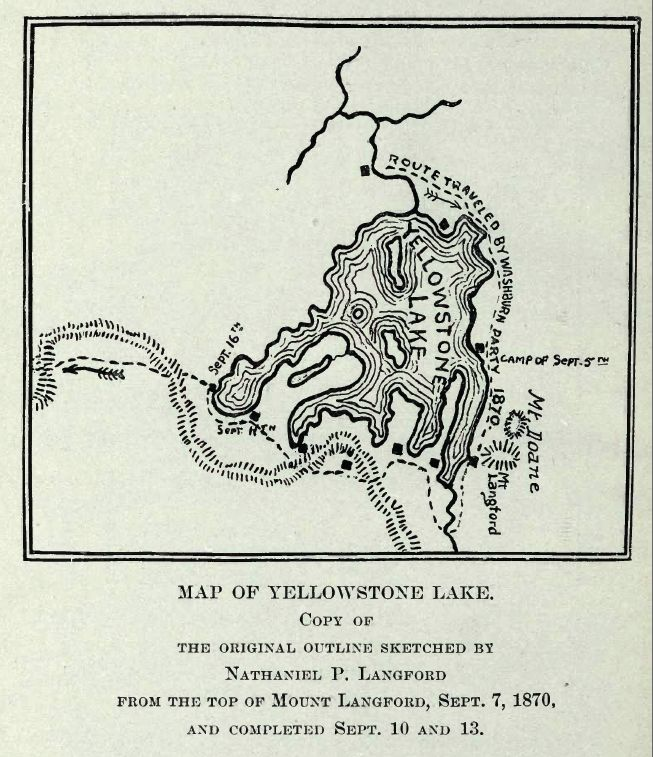
Original Map of Yellowstone Lake sketched from Colter Peak

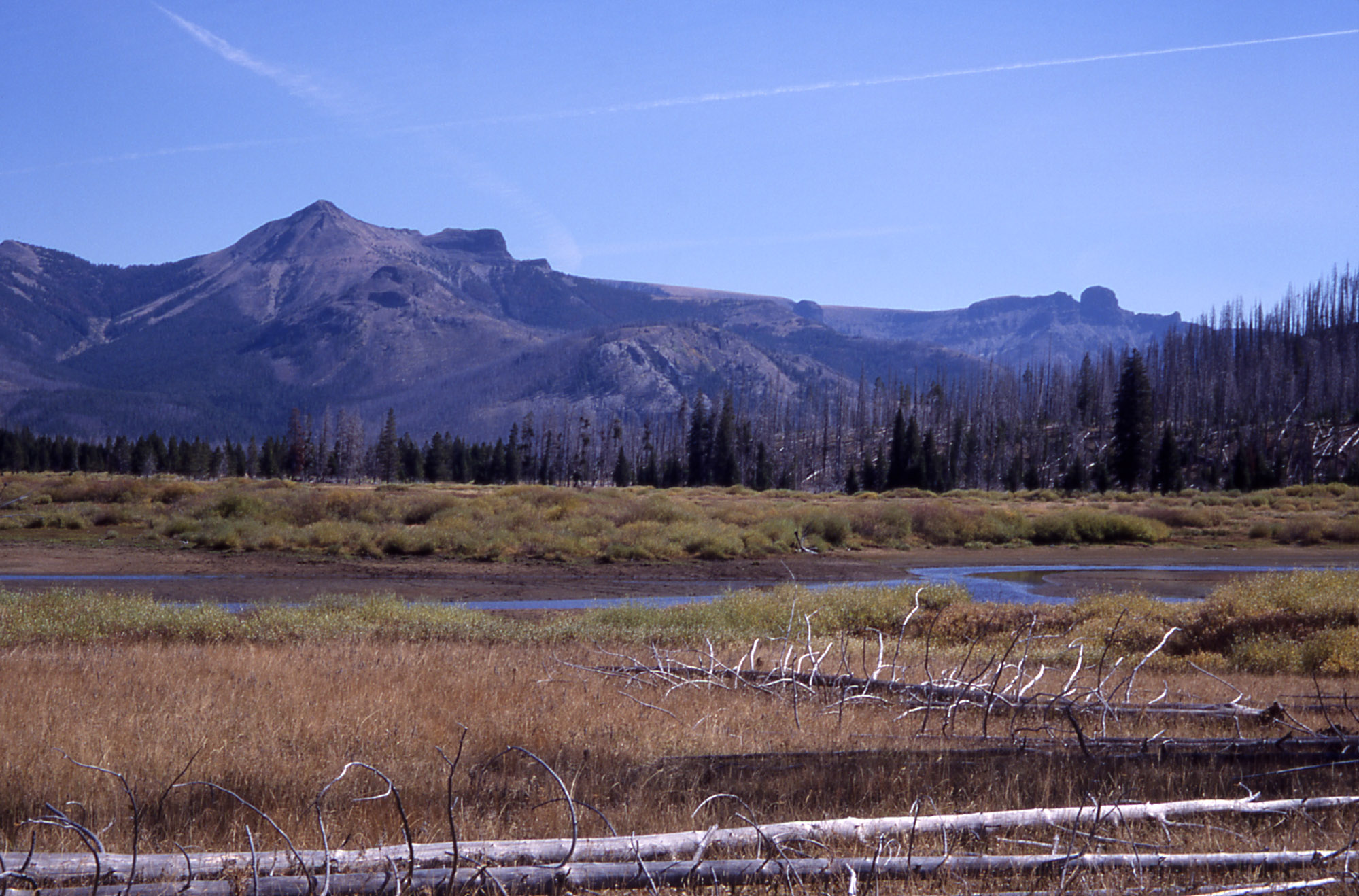
As viewed from Thorofare, 2002

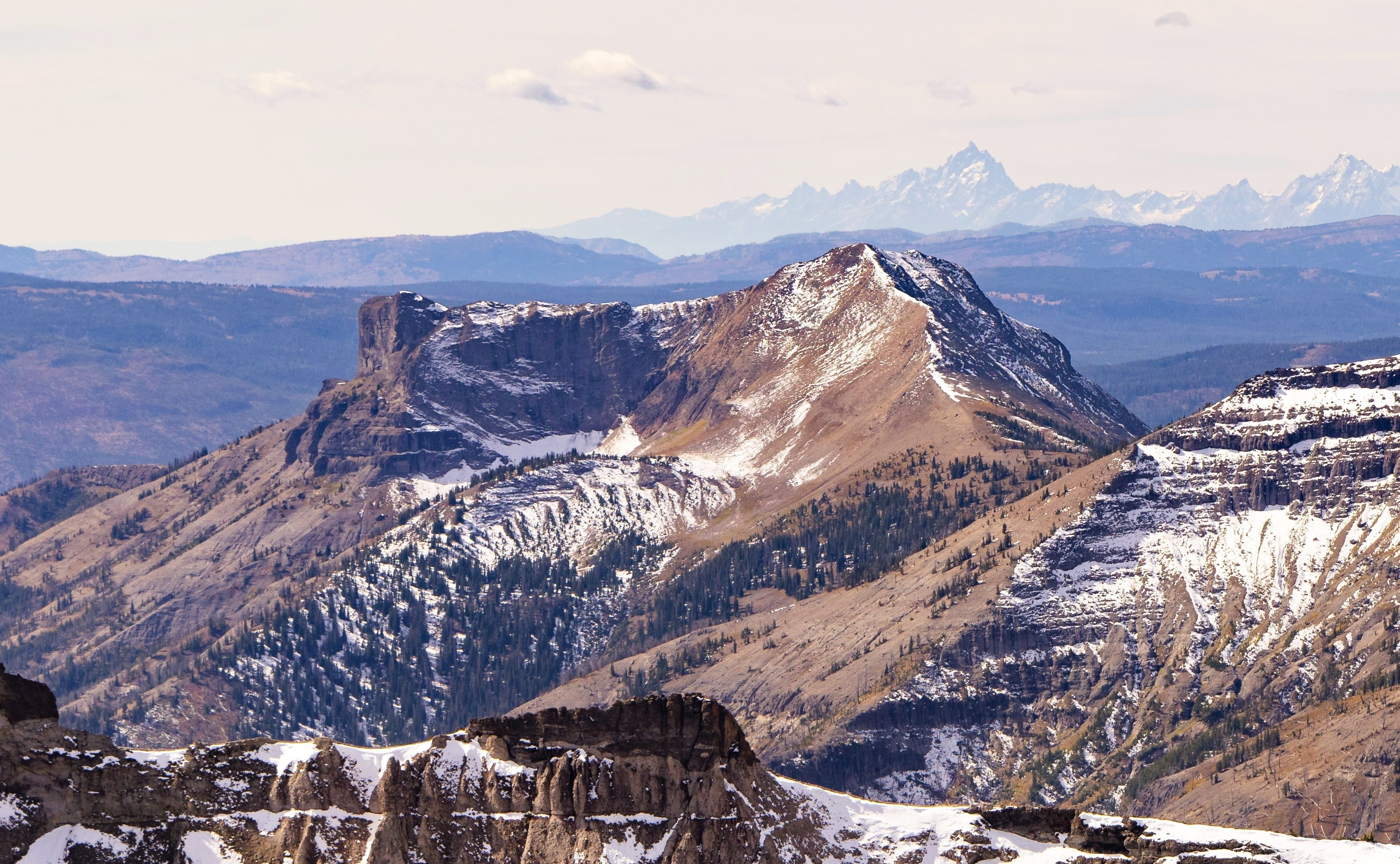
Northeast aspect

== See also ==
- Mountains and mountain ranges of Yellowstone National Park
