= Sylvan Pass (Wyoming) =

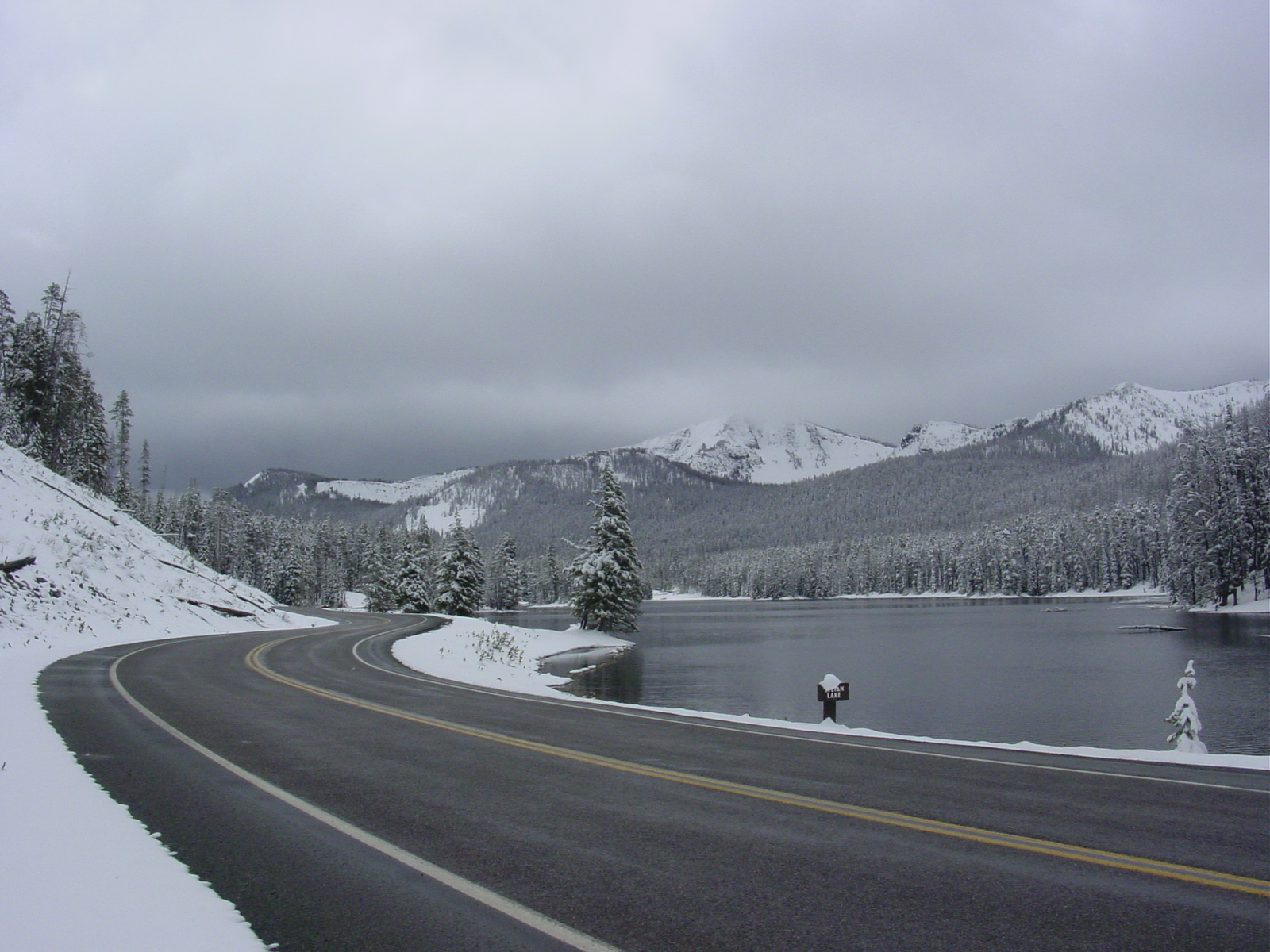
- Sylvan Lake on Sylvan Pass
- Interactive map of Sylvan Pass
- Elevation: 8,524 ft (2,598 m)

Third Approach
- Location: Park County, Wyoming, United States
- Range: Absaroka Range
- Coordinates: 44°27.9′N 110°7.7′W

Sylvan Pass (el. 8,524 feet (2,598 m)) is a mountain pass located in the Absaroka Range in Yellowstone National Park in Wyoming. The pass provides access to the park from the east entrance.

The pass was named after nearby Sylvan Lake (derived from medieval Latin sylvānus, from Latin Silvānus, god of the woods, from silva, forest), and was formed by frost action breaking the rocks. The park road through the pass is closed in winter and avalanches are a common seasonal danger. The road is maintained to allow access via snowmobile, snow coach, and cross-country skiing. In the 2007–08 season it cost the parks service in excess of $200,000 to keep it open and avalanche control measures were put in place.

The Sylvan Pass route is the only way to enter/exit Yellowstone National Park from the East Entrance.

Sylvan Pass is the low point of the saddle between Hoyt Peak and Top Notch Peak.

The original road through the pass was designed by Captain Hiram Chittenden of the Army Corps of Engineers.

== Climate ==
Sylvan Lake (Yellowstone Park) is located near the summit of Sylvan Pass at an altitude of 8420 feet (2566 m). Sylvan Lake has a subarctic climate (Köppen Dfc), characterized by long, cold winters and short summers.

Climate data for Sylvan Lake, Wyoming, 1991–2020 normals, 1983-2020: 8420ft (2566m)
Month	Jan	Feb	Mar	Apr	May	Jun	Jul	Aug	Sep	Oct	Nov	Dec	Year
Record high °F (°C)	55 (13)	60 (16)	60 (16)	69 (21)	77 (25)	86 (30)	86 (30)	85 (29)	81 (27)	73 (23)	60 (16)	48 (9)	86 (30)
Mean maximum °F (°C)	41.7 (5.4)	44.6 (7.0)	53.8 (12.1)	60.4 (15.8)	66.6 (19.2)	75.1 (23.9)	80.5 (26.9)	79.5 (26.4)	74.6 (23.7)	63.5 (17.5)	49.2 (9.6)	38.9 (3.8)	81.5 (27.5)
Mean daily maximum °F (°C)	27.3 (−2.6)	30.2 (−1.0)	38.5 (3.6)	44.9 (7.2)	52.9 (11.6)	60.5 (15.8)	71.1 (21.7)	70.2 (21.2)	60.1 (15.6)	45.6 (7.6)	33.3 (0.7)	25.6 (−3.6)	46.7 (8.2)
Daily mean °F (°C)	17.6 (−8.0)	18.8 (−7.3)	26.1 (−3.3)	32.2 (0.1)	40.6 (4.8)	47.4 (8.6)	55.8 (13.2)	54.7 (12.6)	46.7 (8.2)	35.1 (1.7)	23.8 (−4.6)	16.5 (−8.6)	34.6 (1.5)
Mean daily minimum °F (°C)	7.9 (−13.4)	7.4 (−13.7)	13.6 (−10.2)	19.4 (−7.0)	28.2 (−2.1)	34.2 (1.2)	40.6 (4.8)	39.2 (4.0)	33.1 (0.6)	24.6 (−4.1)	14.3 (−9.8)	7.5 (−13.6)	22.5 (−5.3)
Mean minimum °F (°C)	−16.1 (−26.7)	−16.8 (−27.1)	−9.1 (−22.8)	0.2 (−17.7)	13.1 (−10.5)	26.2 (−3.2)	32.7 (0.4)	30.9 (−0.6)	22.1 (−5.5)	6.7 (−14.1)	−8.5 (−22.5)	−15.8 (−26.6)	−23.9 (−31.1)
Record low °F (°C)	−44 (−42)	−44 (−42)	−29 (−34)	−16 (−27)	−3 (−19)	14 (−10)	17 (−8)	19 (−7)	−1 (−18)	−16 (−27)	−28 (−33)	−46 (−43)	−46 (−43)
Average precipitation inches (mm)	3.97 (101)	3.28 (83)	3.69 (94)	4.20 (107)	3.90 (99)	3.49 (89)	1.54 (39)	1.45 (37)	2.46 (62)	3.50 (89)	4.18 (106)	4.32 (110)	39.98 (1,016)
Source 1: XMACIS2
Source 2: NOAA (Precipitation)

The weather station, Yellowstone NP East ENT, is situated roughly halfway between the summit of Sylvan Pass and Pahaska Tepee, at an elevation of 6954 feet (2120 m).

Climate data for Yellowstone NP East ENT, Wyoming, 1991–2020 normals, 2001–2020 snowfall: 6954ft (2120m)
Month	Jan	Feb	Mar	Apr	May	Jun	Jul	Aug	Sep	Oct	Nov	Dec	Year
Record high °F (°C)	52 (11)	51 (11)	60 (16)	72 (22)	82 (28)	89 (32)	93 (34)	91 (33)	87 (31)	82 (28)	63 (17)	51 (11)	93 (34)
Mean maximum °F (°C)	43.9 (6.6)	44.4 (6.9)	52.5 (11.4)	60.8 (16.0)	72.8 (22.7)	81.6 (27.6)	87.2 (30.7)	86.1 (30.1)	81.3 (27.4)	69.1 (20.6)	53.5 (11.9)	41.8 (5.4)	88.2 (31.2)
Mean daily maximum °F (°C)	29.7 (−1.3)	32.3 (0.2)	39.4 (4.1)	47.0 (8.3)	56.9 (13.8)	67.0 (19.4)	77.7 (25.4)	76.9 (24.9)	66.7 (19.3)	51.3 (10.7)	37.0 (2.8)	28.5 (−1.9)	50.9 (10.5)
Daily mean °F (°C)	16.9 (−8.4)	19.0 (−7.2)	25.3 (−3.7)	34.3 (1.3)	43.3 (6.3)	50.9 (10.5)	58.4 (14.7)	57.0 (13.9)	48.7 (9.3)	37.3 (2.9)	25.2 (−3.8)	16.6 (−8.6)	36.1 (2.3)
Mean daily minimum °F (°C)	4.0 (−15.6)	5.7 (−14.6)	11.2 (−11.6)	21.6 (−5.8)	29.6 (−1.3)	34.8 (1.6)	39.0 (3.9)	37.1 (2.8)	30.7 (−0.7)	23.3 (−4.8)	13.3 (−10.4)	4.7 (−15.2)	21.2 (−6.0)
Mean minimum °F (°C)	−17.4 (−27.4)	−22.5 (−30.3)	−8.4 (−22.4)	6.1 (−14.4)	17.1 (−8.3)	27.9 (−2.3)	32.1 (0.1)	30.0 (−1.1)	23.0 (−5.0)	8.7 (−12.9)	−2.5 (−19.2)	−16.0 (−26.7)	−27.5 (−33.1)
Record low °F (°C)	−32 (−36)	−39 (−39)	−33 (−36)	−10 (−23)	8 (−13)	24 (−4)	27 (−3)	21 (−6)	14 (−10)	−17 (−27)	−21 (−29)	−31 (−35)	−39 (−39)
Average precipitation inches (mm)	2.11 (54)	1.95 (50)	1.89 (48)	2.03 (52)	2.56 (65)	2.64 (67)	1.38 (35)	1.33 (34)	1.94 (49)	2.53 (64)	2.89 (73)	2.87 (73)	26.12 (664)
Average snowfall inches (cm)	28.6 (73)	27.5 (70)	20.8 (53)	14.1 (36)	3.4 (8.6)	0.8 (2.0)	0.0 (0.0)	0.0 (0.0)	1.1 (2.8)	9.0 (23)	19.5 (50)	28.8 (73)	153.6 (391.4)
Source 1: NOAA
Source 2: XMACIS2 (snowfall, records & monthly max/mins)

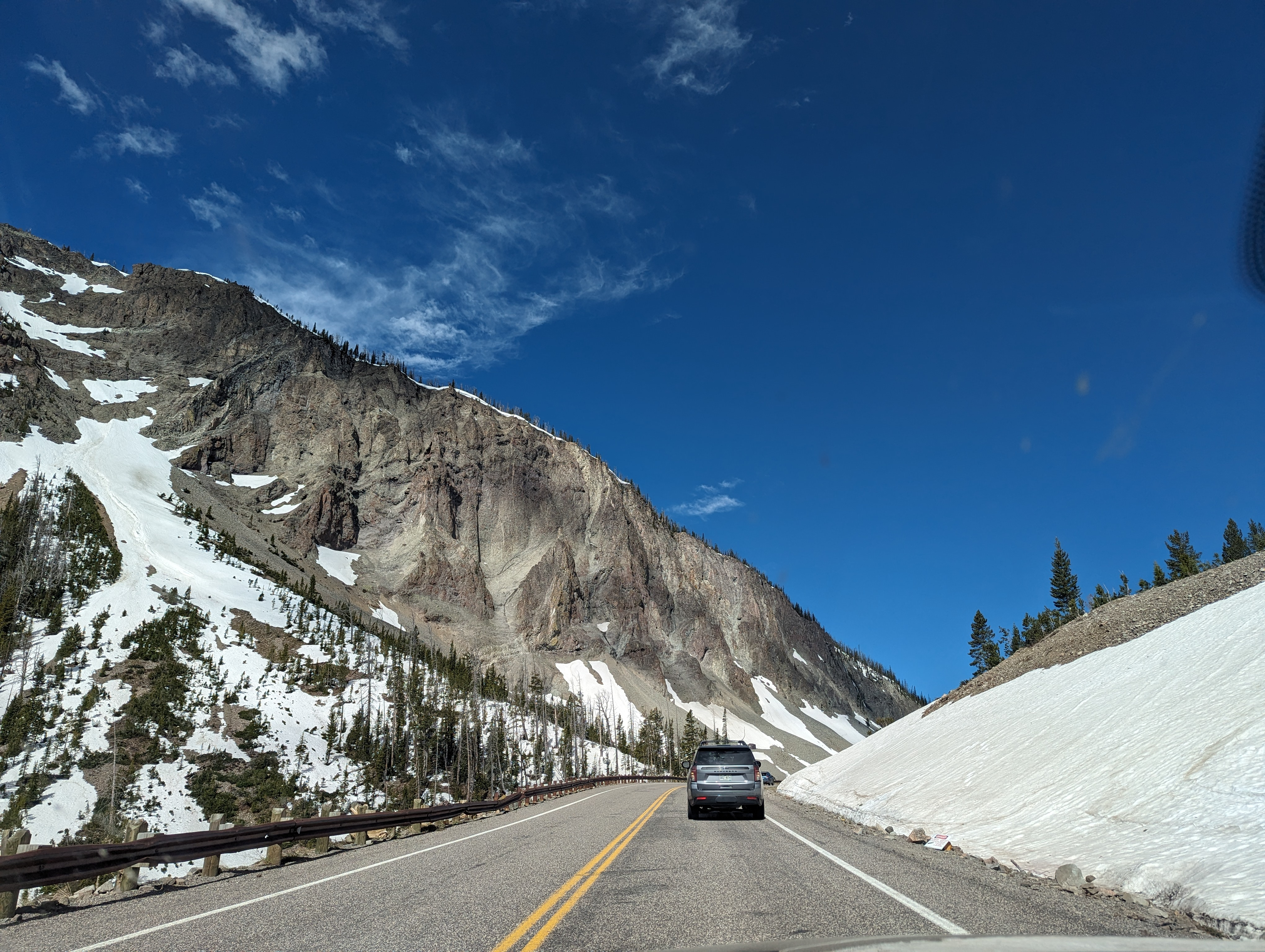
View while driving through Sylvan Pass, 2024

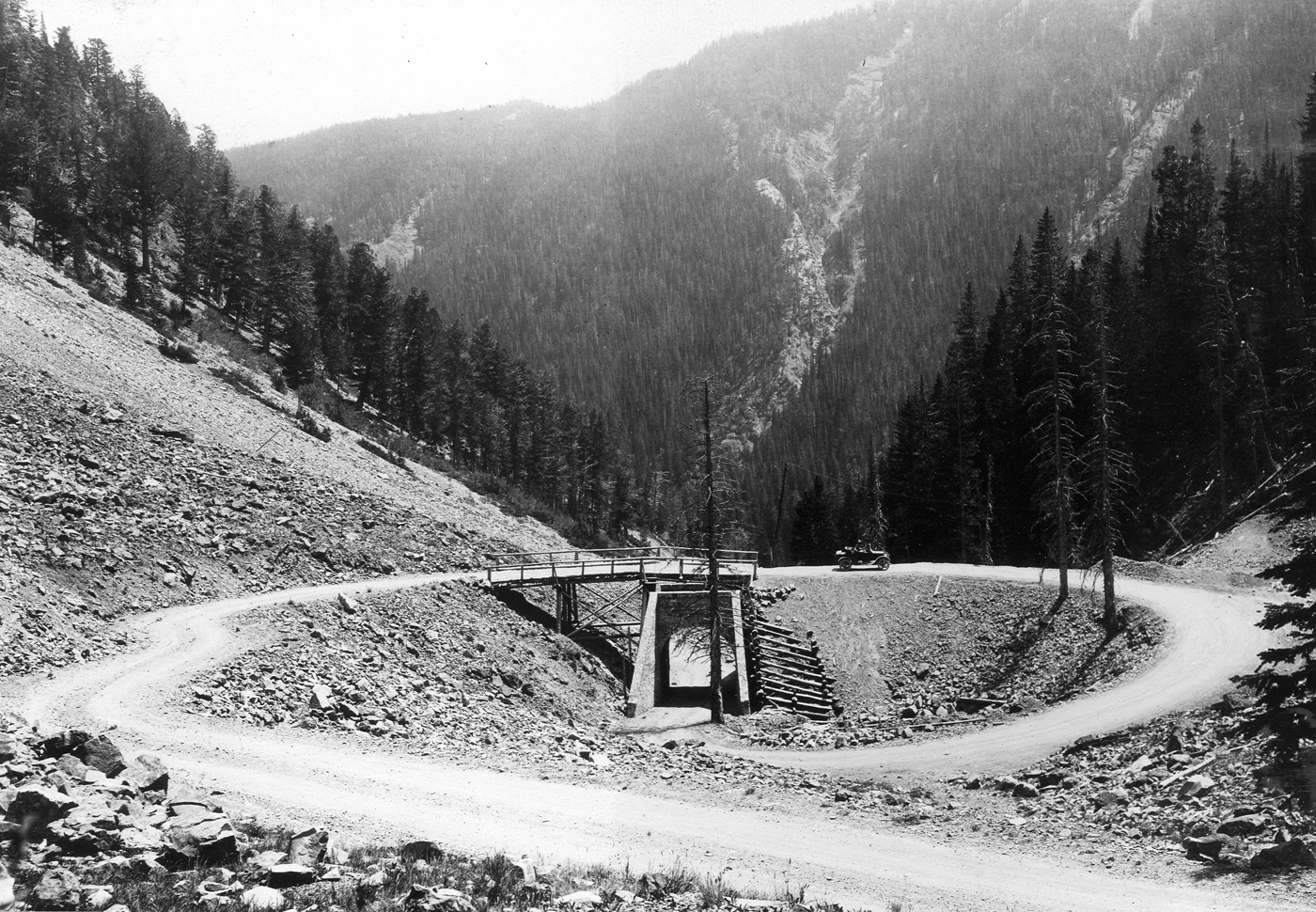
Sylvan Pass Loop, East Side, 1921

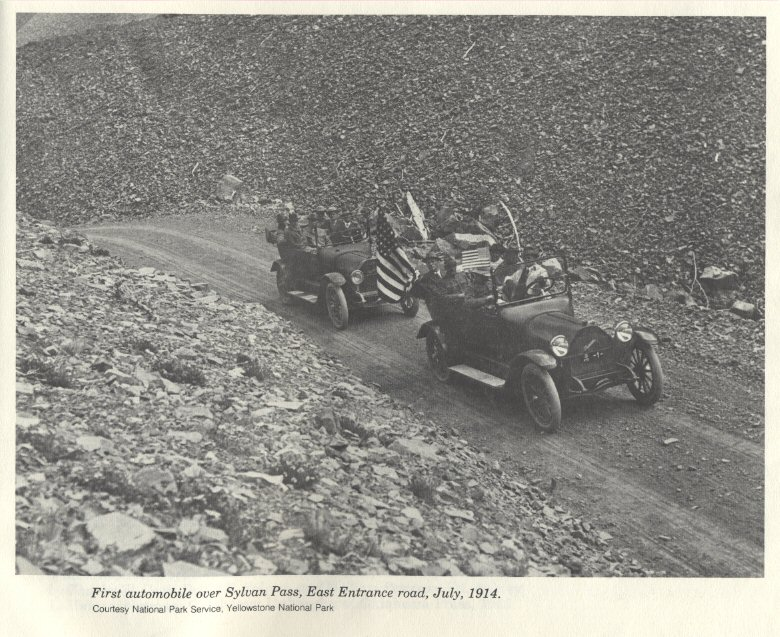
1st automobile over pass, 1914
