= Nathaniel P. Langford =

American explorer, businessman, historian and vigilante

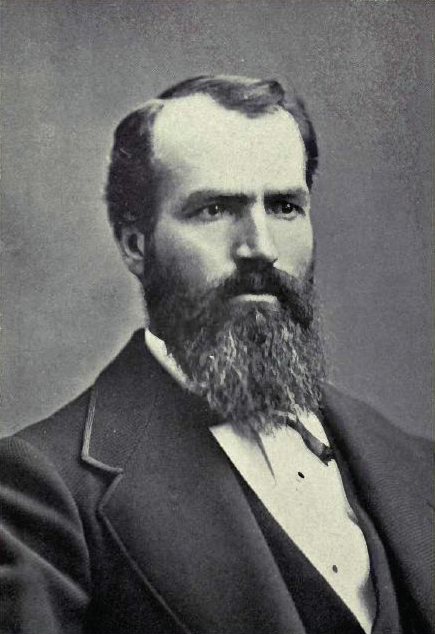
- 1870 portrait of Langford
- Born: August 9, 1832; Westmoreland, New York, U.S.
- Died: October 18, 1911 (aged 79); Minnesota, U.S.
- Occupations: Park superintendent, vigilante, historian

Signature
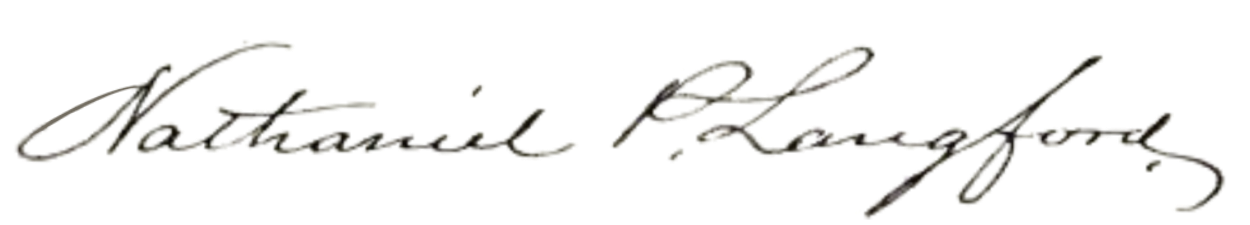

Nathaniel Pitt Langford (August 9, 1832 – October 18, 1911) was an American explorer, businessman, bureaucrat, vigilante, and historian from Saint Paul, Minnesota who played an important role in the early years of the Montana gold fields, territorial government and the creation of Yellowstone National Park.

== Early life ==
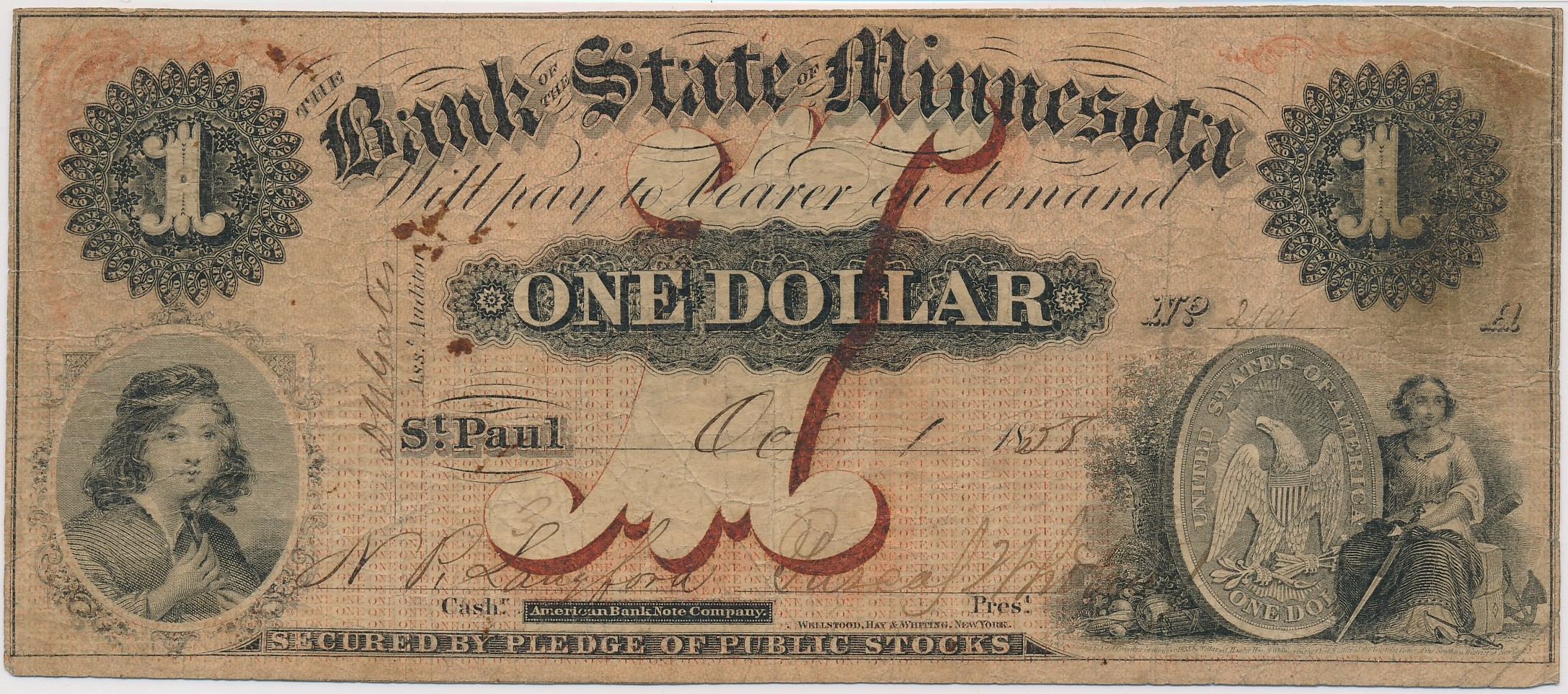
$1 note issued by The Bank of the State of Minnesota signed by Langford as cashier.

Langford was born in Upstate New York and moved to Saint Paul in 1854. In 1858, he became cashier of The Bank of the State of Minnesota, the first bank in the state to open under new Minnesota free banking law. The bank closed the following year.

He was involved with the investment of the Saint Anthony Park neighborhood.

== Montana gold fields ==
On June 16, 1862, Langford, as a member and officer of the Northern Overland Expedition, commanded by Captain James L. Fisk, left Saint Paul to establish a wagon road to the Salmon river mine regions of the Rocky Mountains via Fort Benton. The expedition ended up at the Grasshopper Creek gold fields in the area soon to be named Bannack, Montana. There Langford and his fellow businessmen established freight companies, a saw mill and other businesses.

== Vigilante ==
Langford was also part of the vigilante movement, specifically the infamous Montana Vigilantes, that dealt with lawlessness in Virginia City and Bannack, Montana during 1863–64.

In 1890, Langford wrote Vigilante Days and Ways to chronicle the era of pioneer justice in the American Old West.

== Territorial tax collector ==
In 1864, shortly after the Montana Territory was established on May 28, 1864, Langford was appointed Collector of Internal Revenue and National Bank Examiner, positions he held for five years in the Montana Territorial government. A United States Treasury Department document detailing "receipts and expenditures of the United States for the fiscal year ending June 30, 1868" shows that Langford, listed as "collector district of Montana" took in tax amounts of $134,216.11 and claimed miscellaneous expenses of $40,762.64 during the fiscal year.

== Yellowstone exploration and creation ==
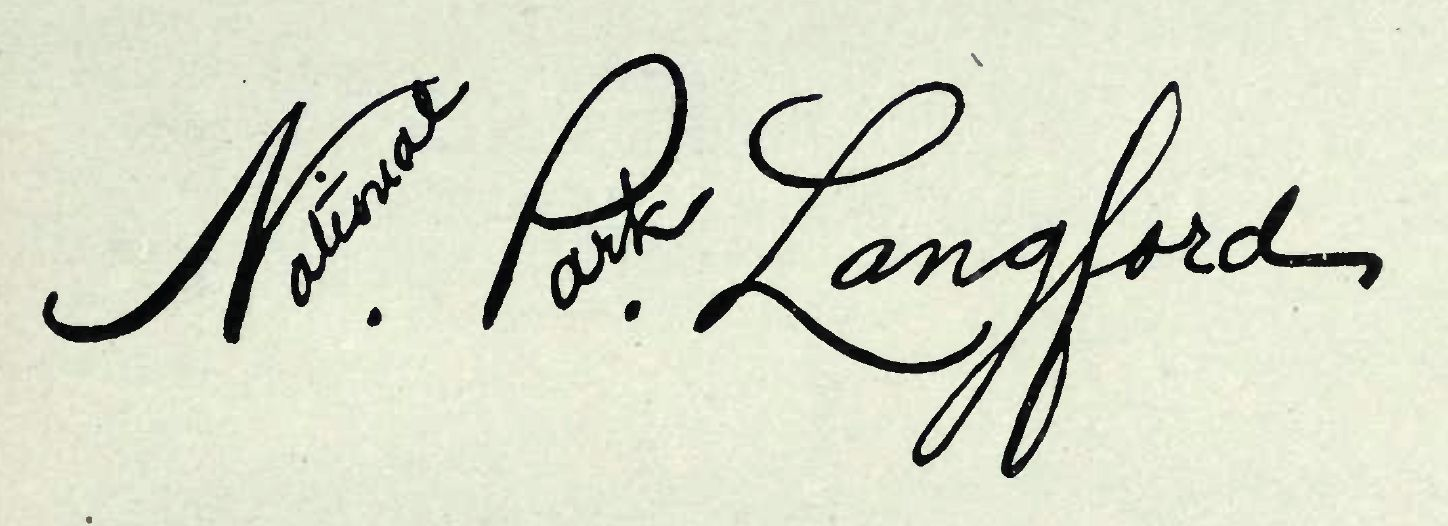
National Park Langford signature from his The Discovery of Yellowstone Park (1870)

Langford was a member of the 1870 Washburn–Langford–Doane Expedition which explored portions of the region that soon would become the Yellowstone National Park. Mount Langford, 10,623 feet (3,238 m) in the Absaroka Range, 7.5 miles (12.1 km) east of Yellowstone Lake, was scaled by Langford and Doane during the expedition and named after him.

After his participation in the Washburn expedition, Langford was appointed as the first superintendent of the park. He soon got the nickname National Park Langford because of his initials N.P. There was no money available to offer him a salary for this new position, so he had to make his living elsewhere. This left Langford with little time to run the park, and he entered it only twice during his five years as superintendent. The first time was as a guest on the second Hayden Expedition in 1872, and his second took place in 1874 to evict a man named Matthew McGuirk. McGuirk claimed to own the Boiling River – one of the park's hot springs rumored to have healing powers.

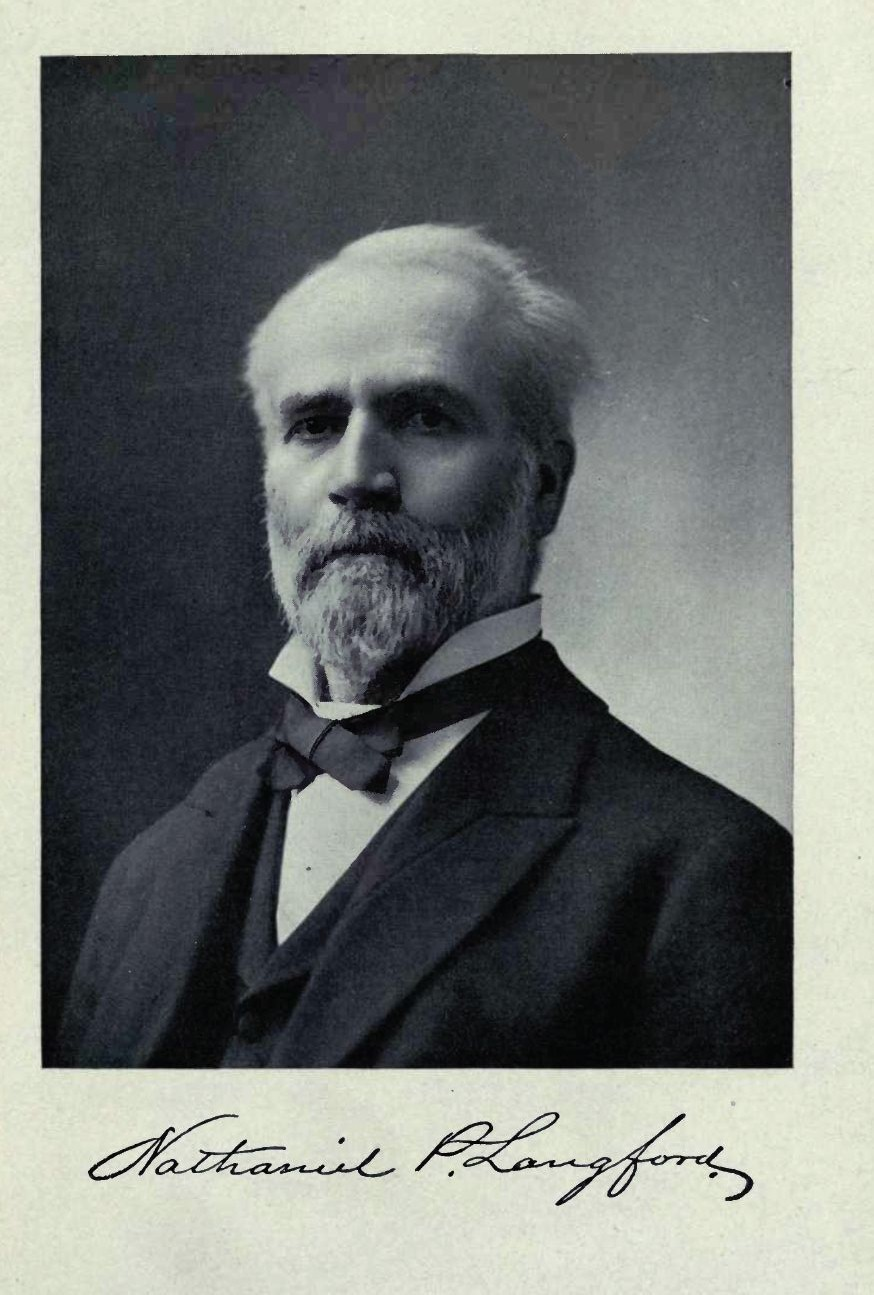
1905 portrait of Langford from The Discovery of Yellowstone Park

Langford had no salary, no funding for the park, and no legal way to enforce protection for its wildlife and geologic features. Political pressure, which took the guise of accusing Langford of neglect, forced the removal of Yellowstone's first superintendent in 1877. He was replaced by Philetus W. Norris. In 1905, Langford published Diary of the Washburn Expedition to the Yellowstone and Firehole In the Year 1870 as a comprehensive insider's view of the expedition.

== Historian ==
After his Yellowstone experiences, Langford returned to his home state of Minnesota and began a career as a Western historian. He was a member of the board of directors of the Minnesota Historical Society, and served as its president he died in 1911 at 79 of a heart attack.
