= North Absaroka Wilderness =

Wilderness area in Wyoming, United States

- IUCN category Ib (wilderness area)
- Location within the United States
- Location: Park County, Wyoming, USA
- Nearest city: Cody, WY
- Coordinates: 44°33′N 109°34′W
- Area: 350,488 acres (1,418.37 km^{2})
- Established: 1964
- Governing body: U.S. Forest Service

The North Absaroka Wilderness is located in Shoshone National Forest in the U.S. state of Wyoming. It lies adjacent to the eastern border of Yellowstone National Park.

U.S. Wilderness Areas do not allow motorized or mechanized vehicles, including bicycles. Although camping and fishing are allowed with proper permit, no roads or buildings are constructed and there is also no logging or mining, in compliance with the 1964 Wilderness Act. Wilderness areas within National Forests and Bureau of Land Management areas also allow hunting in season.

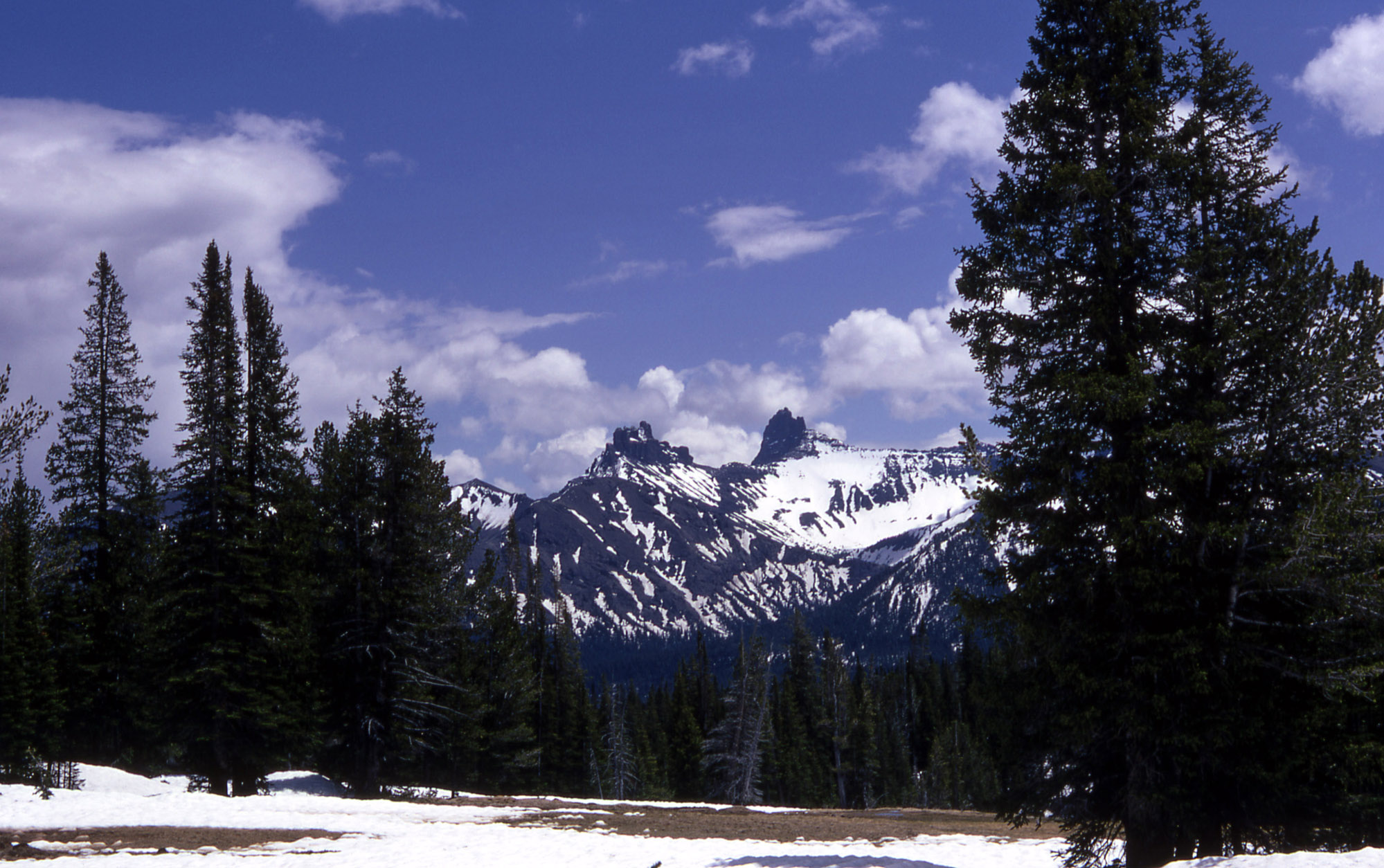
Pilot and Index peaks in the North Absaroka Wilderness

== See also ==
- List of U.S. Wilderness Areas
