= Absaroka Range =

Mountain range in Montana and Wyoming, United States

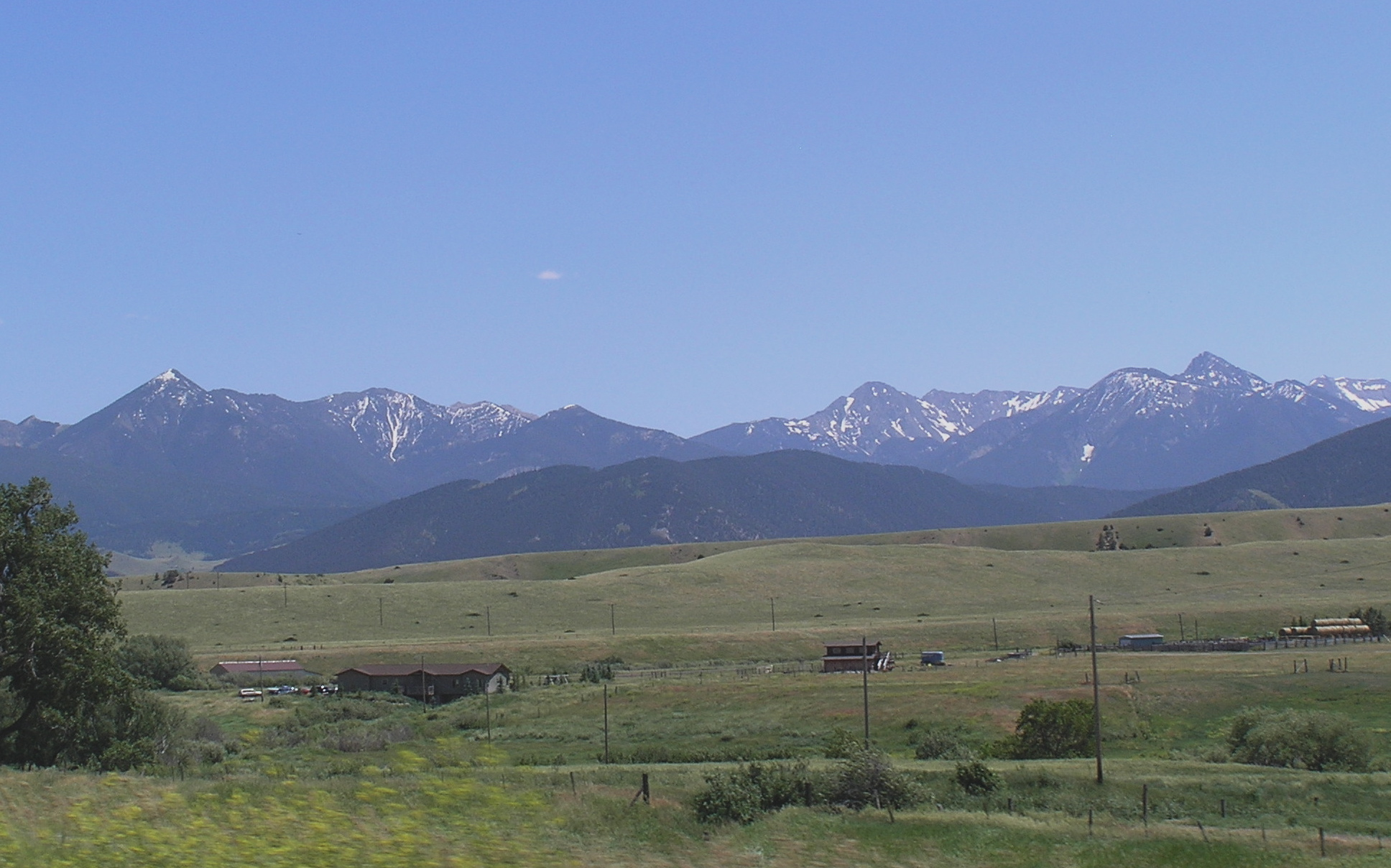
- Absaroka range as seen from west of Livingston, Montana

Highest point
- Peak: Francs Peak
- Elevation: 13,153 ft (4,009 m)
- Coordinates: 43°57′41″N 109°19′51″W

Dimensions
- Length: 150 mi (240 km)
- Width: 75 mi (121 km)

Geography
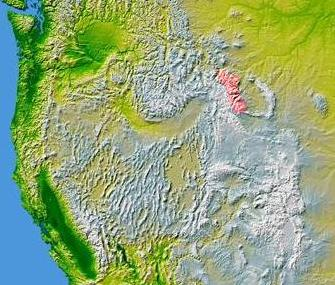
- Absaroka Range is shown highlighted in pink on a map of the western United States
- Country: United States
- States: Montana; Wyoming
- Parent range: Rocky Mountains
- Borders on: Beartooth Mountains; Wind River Range

The Absaroka Range is a sub-range of the Rocky Mountains in the United States. The range stretches roughly north-south around 150 mi (240 km) across the Montana–Wyoming border, and 75 mi (120 km) at its widest east-west extent, forming both the eastern boundary of the Paradise Valley and Yellowstone National Park, and the western edge of the Bighorn Basin. The range borders the Beartooth Mountains to the east and north and the Wind River Range to the south and southwest. The northern edge of the range rests along I-90 and Livingston, Montana. The highest peak in the range is Francs Peak, located in Wyoming at 13,153 ft (4,009 m). There are 46 other peaks over 12,000 ft (3,700 m).

== Geography ==
The range is drained by the Yellowstone River and various tributaries, including the Bighorn River.

Most of the range lies within protected lands including Yellowstone Park, the Absaroka-Beartooth Wilderness, North Absaroka Wilderness, Teton Wilderness, and Washakie Wilderness, spanning the Bridger-Teton National Forest, Custer National Forest, Gallatin National Forest, and Shoshone National Forest.

U.S. Highway 212 from Billings, Montana to Yellowstone climbs over Beartooth Pass 10,947 ft (3,337 m) in the neighboring Beartooth Mountains before winding through the Absarokas to the northeast gate of Yellowstone National Park. It is only open during the summer. U.S Route 14/16/20 follows the Shoshone River from Cody through the range to the eastern gate of the park.

== Climate ==
Climate data for Parker Peak, Wyoming, 1991–2020 normals, extremes 1980–present
Month	Jan	Feb	Mar	Apr	May	Jun	Jul	Aug	Sep	Oct	Nov	Dec	Year
Record high °F (°C)	54 (12)	57 (14)	61 (16)	71 (22)	75 (24)	77 (25)	82 (28)	81 (27)	79 (26)	70 (21)	62 (17)	55 (13)	82 (28)
Mean maximum °F (°C)	44.2 (6.8)	45.3 (7.4)	52.1 (11.2)	58.3 (14.6)	64.6 (18.1)	70.0 (21.1)	75.5 (24.2)	74.8 (23.8)	70.5 (21.4)	61.1 (16.2)	49.4 (9.7)	41.3 (5.2)	76.4 (24.7)
Mean daily maximum °F (°C)	25.3 (−3.7)	28.3 (−2.1)	36.0 (2.2)	42.1 (5.6)	50.0 (10.0)	56.7 (13.7)	66.3 (19.1)	65.1 (18.4)	56.2 (13.4)	42.8 (6.0)	30.8 (−0.7)	23.6 (−4.7)	43.6 (6.4)
Daily mean °F (°C)	17.1 (−8.3)	18.7 (−7.4)	25.3 (−3.7)	30.8 (−0.7)	39.4 (4.1)	46.5 (8.1)	55.3 (12.9)	54.5 (12.5)	46.1 (7.8)	33.8 (1.0)	22.8 (−5.1)	16.1 (−8.8)	33.9 (1.1)
Mean daily minimum °F (°C)	9.0 (−12.8)	9.1 (−12.7)	14.7 (−9.6)	19.6 (−6.9)	28.8 (−1.8)	36.2 (2.3)	44.4 (6.9)	43.5 (6.4)	36.0 (2.2)	24.8 (−4.0)	14.7 (−9.6)	8.5 (−13.1)	24.1 (−4.4)
Mean minimum °F (°C)	−9.9 (−23.3)	−10.2 (−23.4)	−2.1 (−18.9)	5.2 (−14.9)	14.8 (−9.6)	25.1 (−3.8)	35.5 (1.9)	32.9 (0.5)	21.2 (−6.0)	6.5 (−14.2)	−3.8 (−19.9)	−10.7 (−23.7)	−18.1 (−27.8)
Record low °F (°C)	−28 (−33)	−23 (−31)	−19 (−28)	−9 (−23)	7 (−14)	17 (−8)	26 (−3)	20 (−7)	2 (−17)	−12 (−24)	−19 (−28)	−33 (−36)	−33 (−36)
Average precipitation inches (mm)	3.18 (81)	3.16 (80)	3.24 (82)	3.73 (95)	3.66 (93)	3.01 (76)	1.44 (37)	1.34 (34)	2.03 (52)	3.05 (77)	3.44 (87)	3.59 (91)	34.87 (885)
Average extreme snow depth inches (cm)	64.3 (163)	75.7 (192)	82.7 (210)	87.5 (222)	75.7 (192)	38.7 (98)	3.3 (8.4)	0.2 (0.51)	3.3 (8.4)	15.4 (39)	32.7 (83)	51.2 (130)	88.9 (226)
Average precipitation days (≥ 0.01 in)	15.2	14.1	15.9	17.1	15.9	12.8	7.7	7.0	9.0	13.5	14.5	16.0	158.7
Source: XMACIS2 (snow depth 2006–2020)

== History ==
The range is named after the Absaroka Native People. The name is derived from the Hidatsa name for the Crow people; it means "children of the large-beaked bird." (In contrast, the Crow name, Awaxaawe Báaxxioo, means "Pointed Mountains [Like Sand Castles].")

John Colter, who may have been the first white person to visit the area, probably traveled along the foot of the Absarokas in 1807 during his reconnaissance of the Yellowstone region. Early explorers also included Gustavus Cheyney Doane and Nathaniel P. Langford, who climbed the summit of Colter Peak in 1870.

The proposed state of Absaroka shared its name with the mountain range. The USS Absaroka was named after this mountain range.

== Geology ==
Geologically, the section of the range in Wyoming consists of volcanic breccia, whereas there is a transition to granite and gneiss bedrock further north of the state line.

=== Absaroka Volcanic Province ===
Igneous rocks of the Absaroka Volcanic Province cover an area of approximately 23,000 km^{2} (8,900 sq mi; 2,300,000 ha) in southwestern Montana and northwestern Wyoming, including roughly one third of Yellowstone National Park. These extrusive rocks were erupted during the Eocene Epoch of the Paleogene Period. Radiometric dating has shown that eruptive activity lasted from about 53 to 43.7 million years ago. The eroded remnants of many large stratovolcanoes are found in the area. The dissection of these long extinct volcanoes by erosion allows geologists to see volcanic structures that are impossible to see in active volcanoes. Many terms now widely used in volcanology originated in nineteenth century field studies of these ancient volcanoes.

== Gallery ==
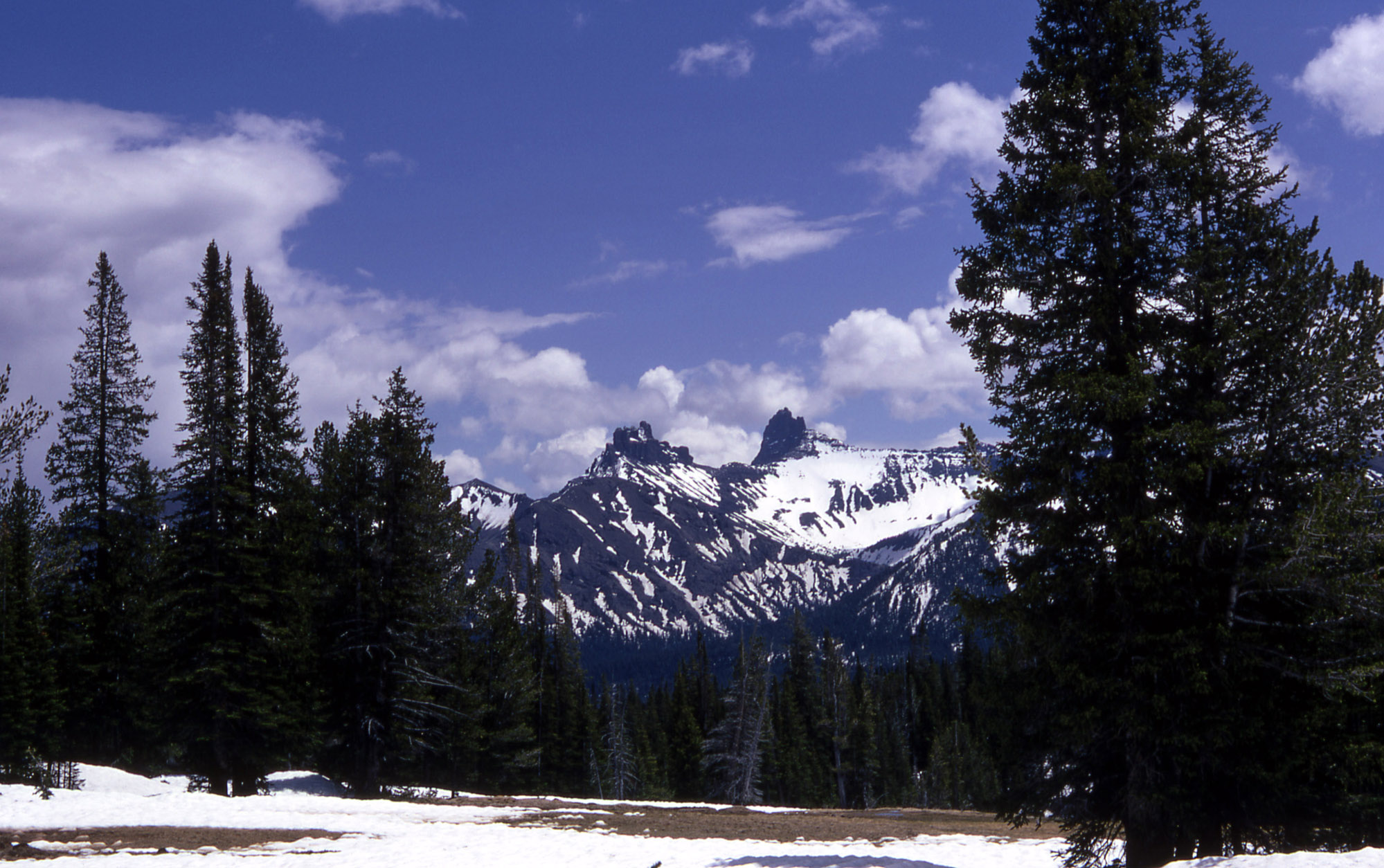
Pilot and Index peaks in the Absaroka Mountains

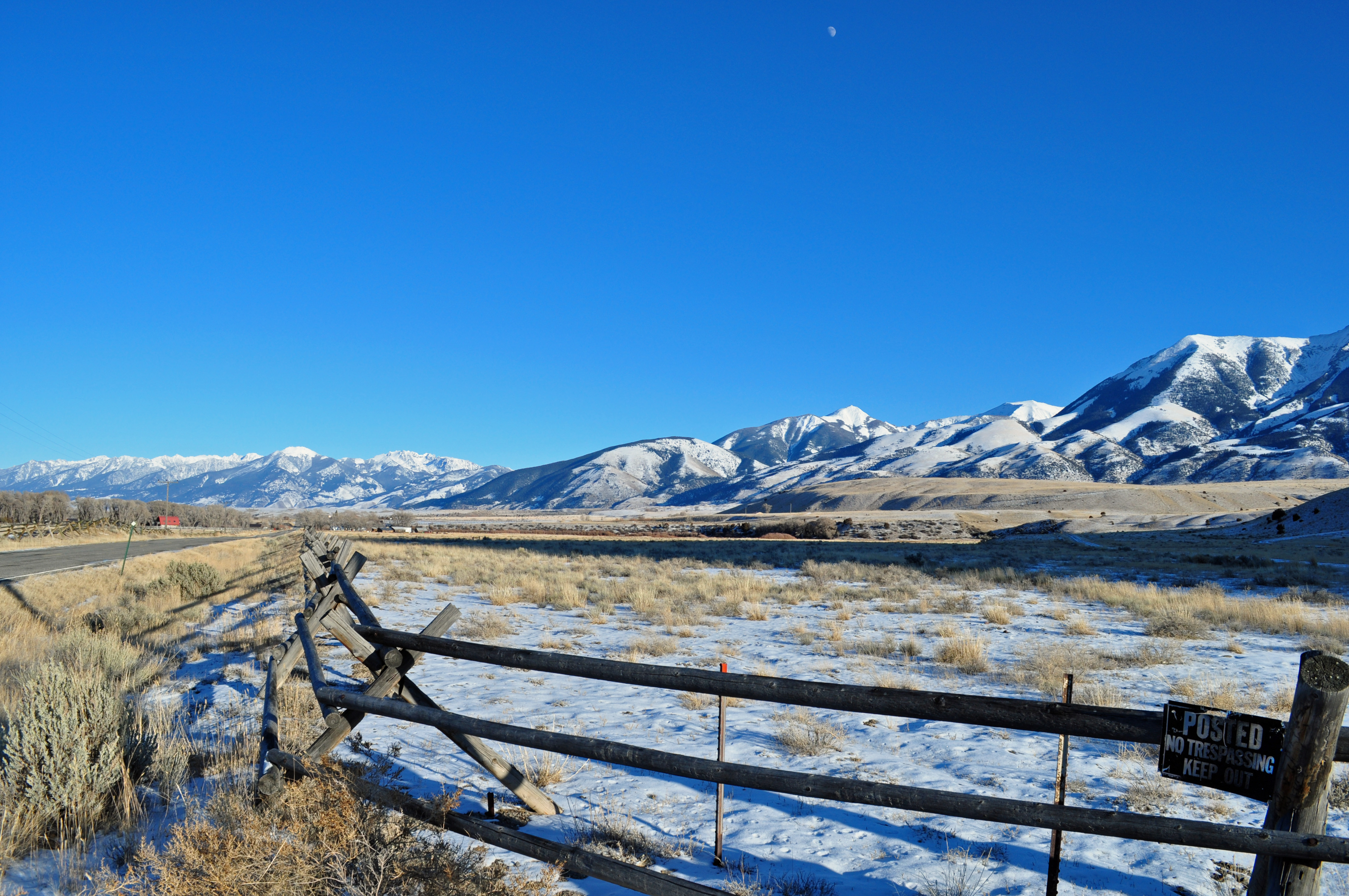
Western face of Absarokas from Paradise Valley (Montana)

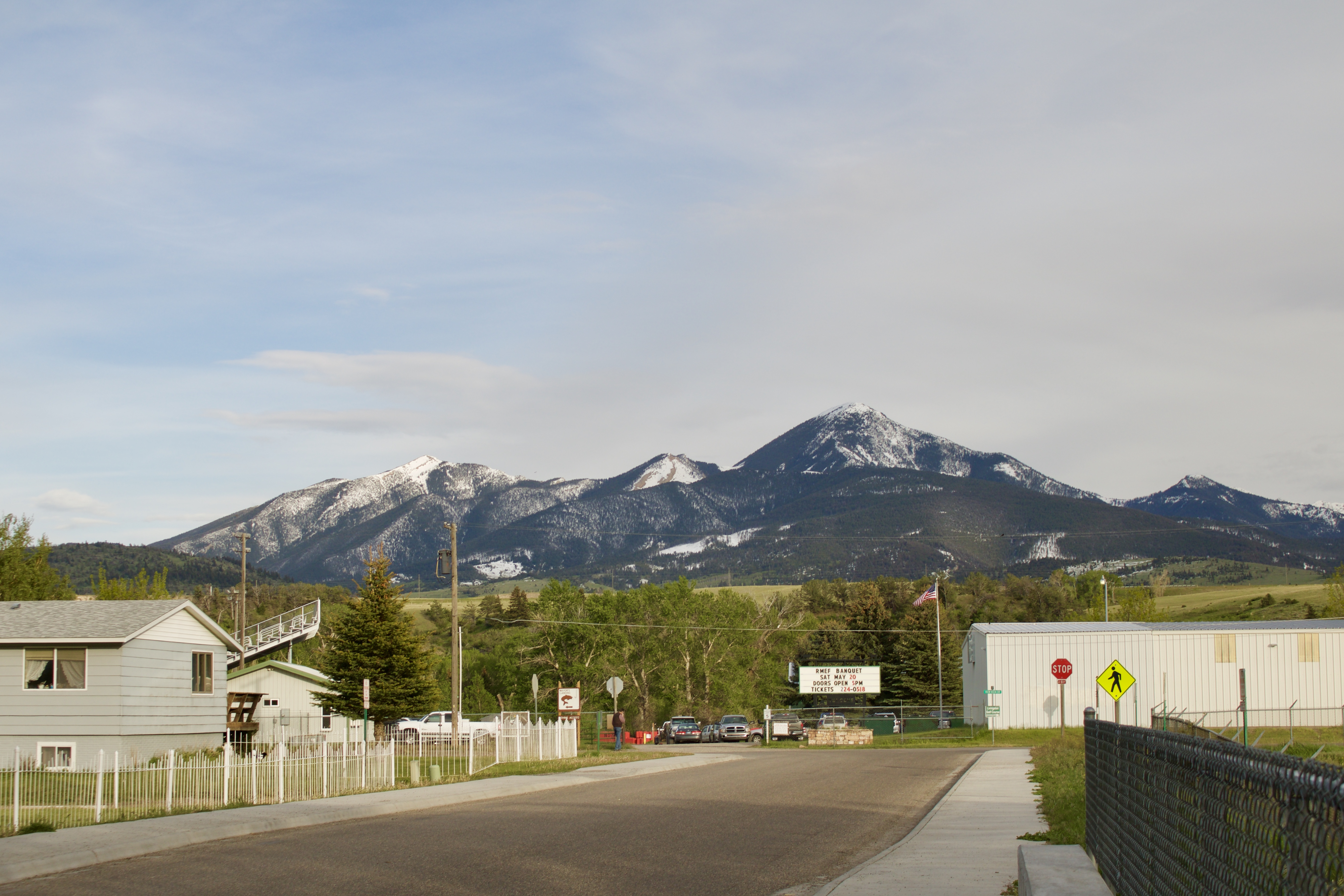
Northern Absaroka range as seen from Livingston, Montana

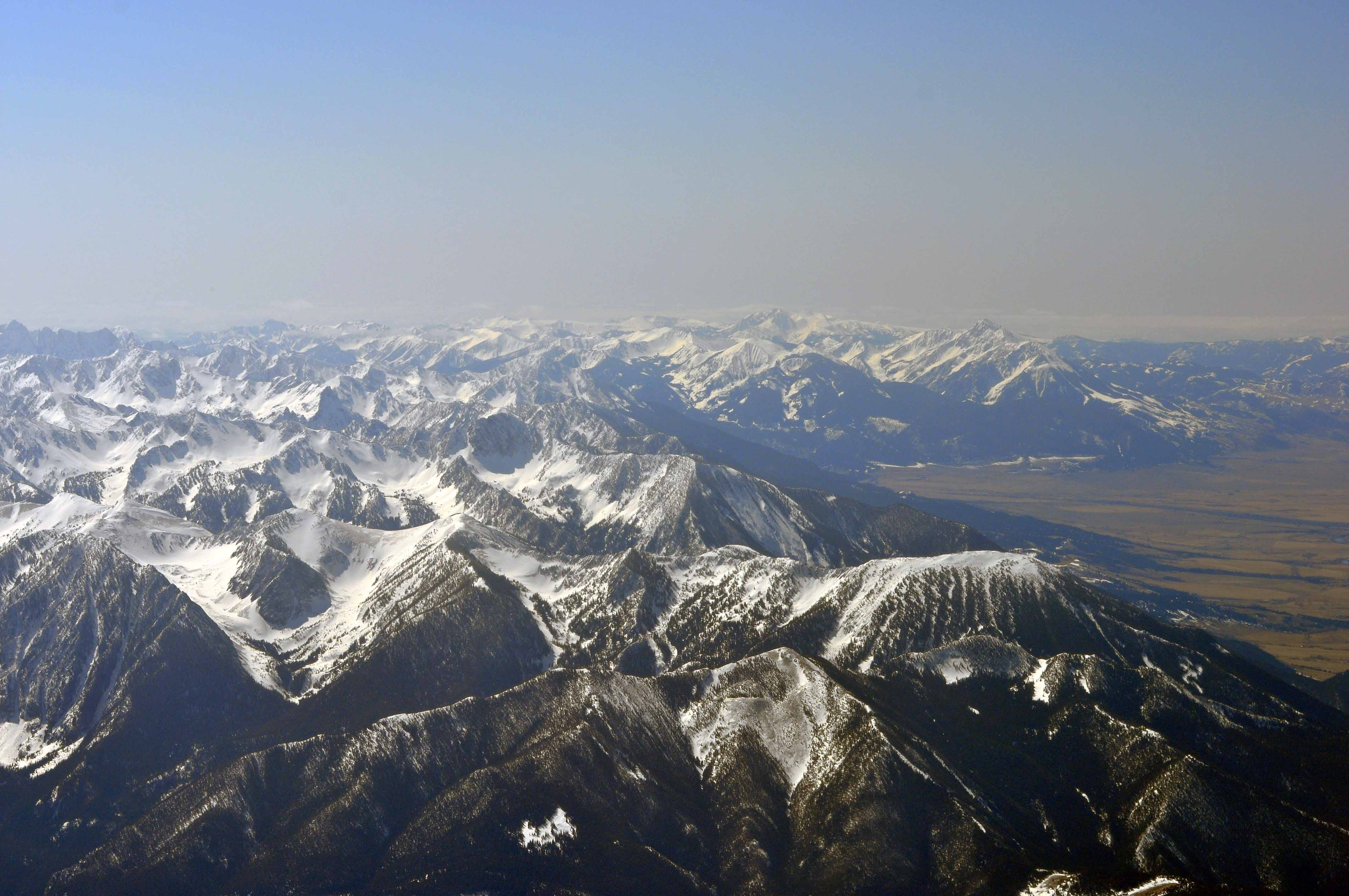
Northwest expanse of Absarokas as viewed from 15,000 feet (4,600 m) over Livingston, Montana

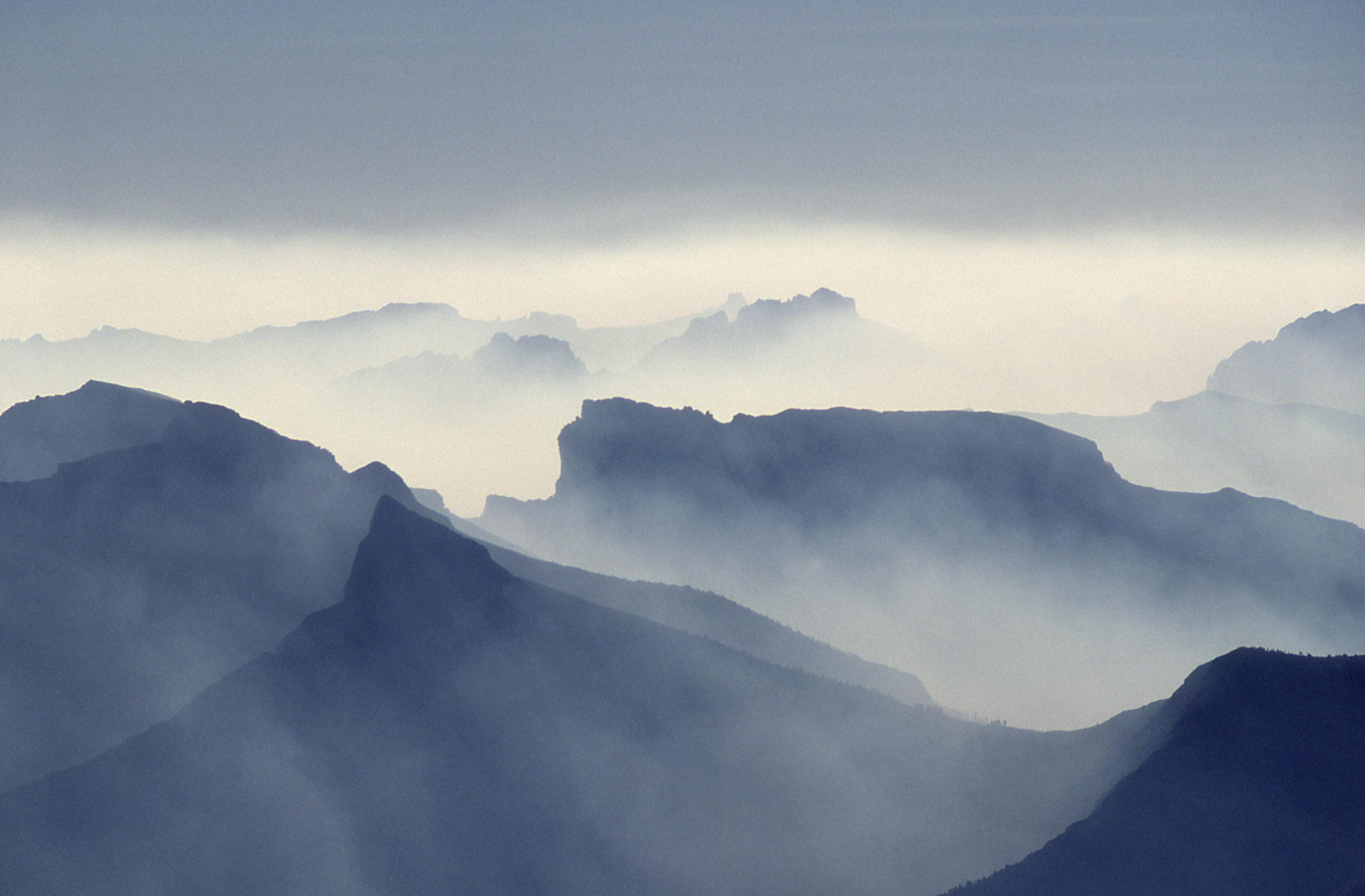
The mountains on August 19, 1988, smoky due to the Yellowstone fires of 1988

== See also ==
- List of mountains and mountain ranges of Yellowstone National Park
- List of mountain ranges in Montana
- List of mountain ranges in Wyoming
