= Mountain Chief =

Native American warrior (1848–1942)

- Nínaiistáko (Ninna-stako)
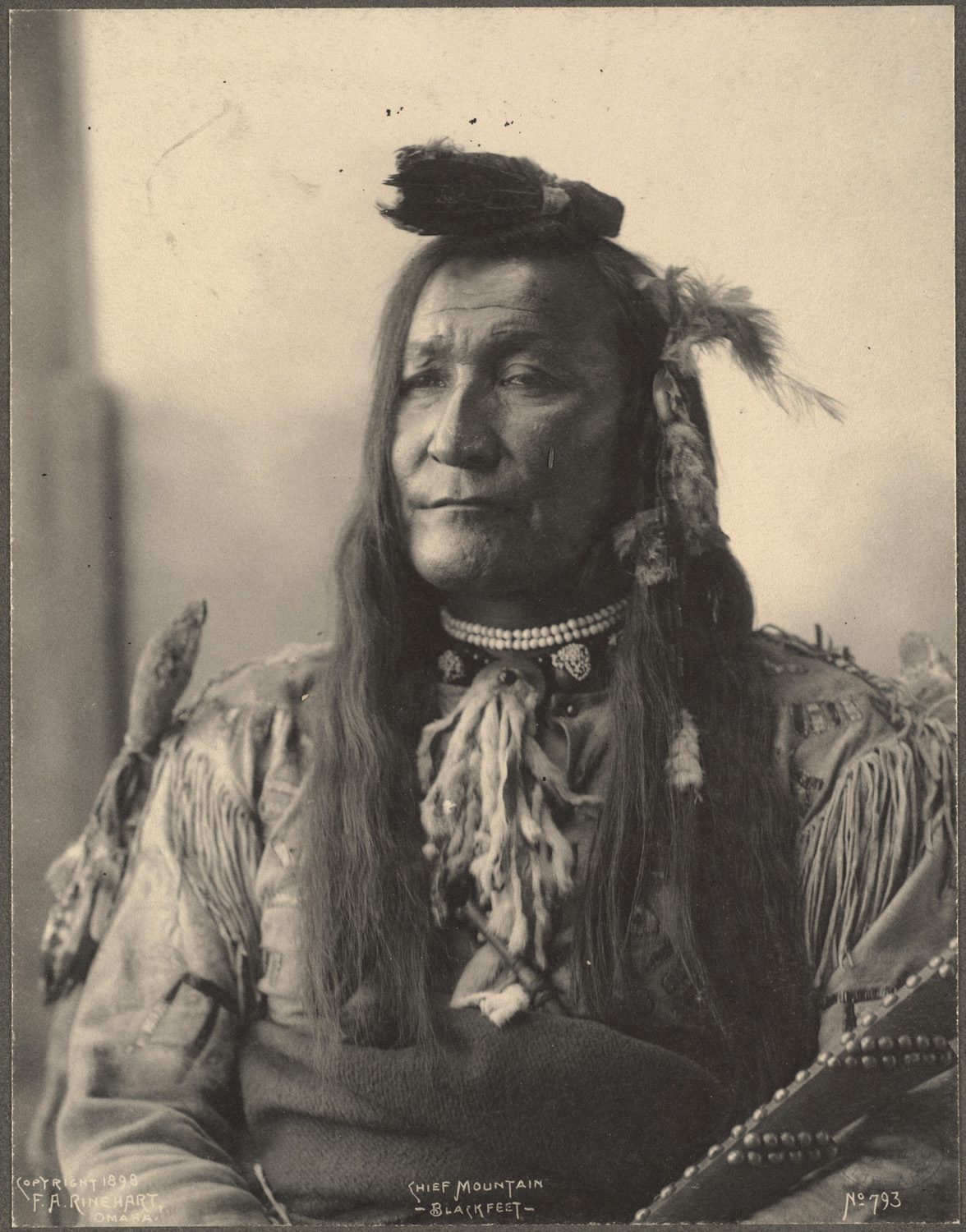
- Mountain Chief at the Indian Congress of 1898
- Born: c. 1848; Oldman River, British North America
- Died: February 2, 1942 (aged 94); Browning, Montana
- Resting place: Browning, Montana
- Spouse(s): Bird Sailing This Way; Fine Stealing Woman; Hates To Stay Alone; Gun Woman For Nothing
- Parents: Mountain Chief (father); Charging Across Quartering (mother)

Mountain Chief (Blackfoot: Nínaiistáko or Ninna-stako; c. 1848 – February 2, 1942) was a South Piegan warrior of the Blackfoot Tribe. Mountain Chief was also called Big Brave (Omach-katsi) and adopted the name Frank Mountain Chief. Mountain Chief was involved in the 1870 Marias Massacre, signed the Treaty of Fort Laramie in 1868, and worked with anthropologist Frances Densmore to interpret folksong recordings.

== Early life ==
Mountain Chief (Blackfoot/South Piegan) was born around 1848 at Oldman River in Alberta, Canada (then British North America). Mountain Chief was the son of Mountain Chief and Charging Across Quartering. Mountain Chief's father, also known as Butte Bull and Bear Cutting, was a South Piegan chief and the son of Kicking Woman and Chief Killer. Mountain Chief was the hereditary chief of the Fast Buffalo Horse band.

Mountain Chief was a Piegan (South Piegan) and part of the Blackfeet Nation (Amskapi Pikuni), one of four tribal groups composing the Blackfoot Confederacy. Mountain Chief lived on the Blackfeet Indian Reservation in Montana. Mountain Chief's father became chief around the time that Lewis and Clark visited in 1806.

In Mountain Chief's childhood, his father gave him a buckskin yearling, a bay horse whose color resembles that of tanned deerskin. Mountain Chief learned to hunt birds and prairie dogs using arrows without points, and his mother's father, Big Smoke, made his first bow that he used for hunting. When Mountain Chief was old enough to ride well, he began to hunt buffalo and was given steel-tipped arrows. Mountain Chief participated in his first war party when he was 15 years old, at which time he was given his first war name, Big Brave (Umak’atci), by Head Carrier. In his adolescence, Mountain Chief went by the name Big Brave, as his father was also named Mountain Chief.

Mountain Chief was the half-brother of Owl Child, who was involved in the Marias Massacre. Mountain Chief had two full sisters, Little Snake and Last Kill. He also had three other half-brothers, Sitting In The Middle, Red Bull, and Last Kill, and one half-sister, Lone Cut. Mountain Chief was married to five different women, including Bird Sailing This Way, Fine Stealing Woman, Hates To Stay Alone, and Gun Woman For Nothing. And he had seven known children with these five wives, including Stealing In The Daytime, Rose Mountain Chief, Antoine Mountain Chief, Walter Mountain Chief, Tackler (Teckla), Emma Mountain Chief, Red Horn and Good Bear Woman.

Mountain Chief's name "Nínaiistáko / Ninna-stako" in Blackfoot, translates to "Chief Mountain," which is the name of the mountain in the northeastern part of what is now Glacier National Park. The name "Chief Mountain" is often written as "Mountain Chief" in English. Mountain Chief's father, the original bearer of that name – many would follow – died in 1872.

== Marias (Baker) Massacre ==
During the late 1860s, Mountain Chief, like many other South Piegan chiefs, tried to stop trading between South Piegans and white whiskey traders. Although Mountain Chief was peaceful, he was accused of killing John Bozeman in the spring of 1867. As a result of Bozeman and later Malcolm Clarke's deaths, the warriors in Mountain Chief's band became the target of the Second United States Cavalry on January 23, 1870, resulting in the Marias Massacre.

The Marias Massacre occurred at Willow Rounds on January 23, 1870, and led to the death of approximately 200 Piegans from Chief Heavy Runner's Amskapi Pikuni (Blackfoot/South Piegan) band camped on the Marias River. The massacre resulted from an incident which inflamed already tense relations between the Blackfoot Confederacy and the white settlers in Montana.

In 1869, Mountain Chief's half-brother Owl Child (Blackfoot/South Piegan) stole several horses from Malcolm Clarke, a white ranch owner in Montana. Bear Head (Kai Okotan), a Pikuni (Blackfoot/Piikani) informant to James Willard Schultz, also claimed that Clarke had made sexual advances towards Owl Child's wife. After Owl Child stole his horses, Clarke tracked down Owl Child and beat and humiliated him in front of his camp. On August 17, 1869, Owl Child (Netuscheo) led an Amskapi Pikuni party that killed Malcolm Clarke and shot his son Horace at Clarke's home near Helena, Montana. All five attackers in Owl Child's party belonged to Mountain Chief's band. At the time of Owl Child's attack, Mountain Chief was the head chief of the Amskapi Pikuni.

In response to Owl Child's attack and to prevent raids on white settlers by Native American warrior parties, General Philip Sheridan sent a band of cavalry led by Major Eugene Baker at Fort Ellis to punish those involved in Clarke's death, namely Mountain Chief's band. When Baker's forces arrived along the Marias River, they approached the small camp of Gray Wolf, which was infected with smallpox (the Blackfeet Nation suffered from an epidemic of smallpox in January 1870), and the troops learned that a large band of the South Piegans was encamped down the river, which they believed was Mountain Chief's large band. This was not Mountain Chief's band, but was rather that of Chief Heavy Runner. Before the Marias Massacre, Mountain Chief and his band of South Piegan warriors, the intended target, had been warned and fled to safety in Canada before Major Eugene Baker reached them traveling downstream.

The cavalry was readied to ambush the South Piegans until Heavy Runner (Blackfoot/South Piegan) came out with a safe-conduct paper, which was signed 23 days before the massacre by General Sully proving that Heavy Runner was a friend of the United States army. Despite this paper, Army scout Joe Cobell shot and killed Heavy Runner and the cavalrymen shot at the lodges and massacred the Piegans. Of the 140 people that were captured alive, all were turned loose without clothing, food, and horses and many froze to death on their return to Fort Benton. Mountain Chief had close ties to Heavy Runner's camp. Good Bear Woman, Mountain Chief's daughter, was at Heavy Runner's camp at the day of the massacre and Heavy Runner's wife was Mountain Chief's sister.

General William Tecumseh Sherman was confronted with outrage in Congress after the massacre, but he insisted that most of those killed in the incident were warriors in Mountain Chief's camp. The people of Montana and General Sherman had been given permission to attack the South Piegans if they were not within reservation boundaries, but the cavalrymen attacked the South Piegans on reservation territory that had been established in 1868. Two news articles written in February and March 1870 mentioned that Mountain Chief's son, Red Horn, was killed in the massacre. In a letter to Philip Sheridan on March 24, 1870, Sherman stated that, "I prefer to believe that the majority of the killed at Mountain Chief's camp were warriors." Fools Crow (1986), a novel written by James Welch (Blackfoot/A'aninin), included the story of the Marias Massacre.

== Political involvement ==
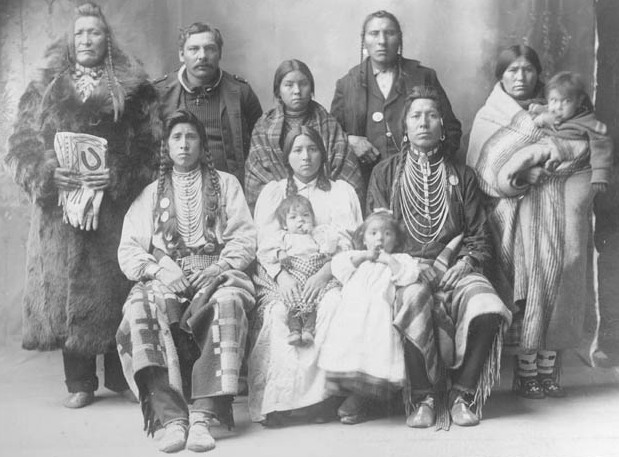
Mountain Chief (rear left) and other Piegan Blackfeet at the Indian Congress in 1898. Photograph by Frank Rinehart.

Blackfoot Confederacy leaders signed three peace treaties in 1855, 1865, and 1868, all of which decreased the size of the territory of the Blackfoot Confederacy. Mountain Chief's father and Chief Lame Bull signed a treaty in 1855 between the United States and the Blackfoot Tribe with President Franklin Pierce. Mountain Chief signed the Treaty of Fort Laramie on April 29, 1868. Mountain Chief gained prominence through warfare with the Crows and Kutenai and facilitated treaty negotiations in the 1880s and 1890s, visiting Washington, D.C., often.

Mountain Chief was a member of the Indian Congress held from August to October 1898 in conjunction with the Trans-Mississippi International Exposition in Omaha, Nebraska. Mountain Chief also travelled with a delegation to Washington, D.C., in 1903 to provide information related to the Blackfeet Nation and to speak with the United States Commissioner of Indian Affairs.

== Collaboration with anthropologists ==
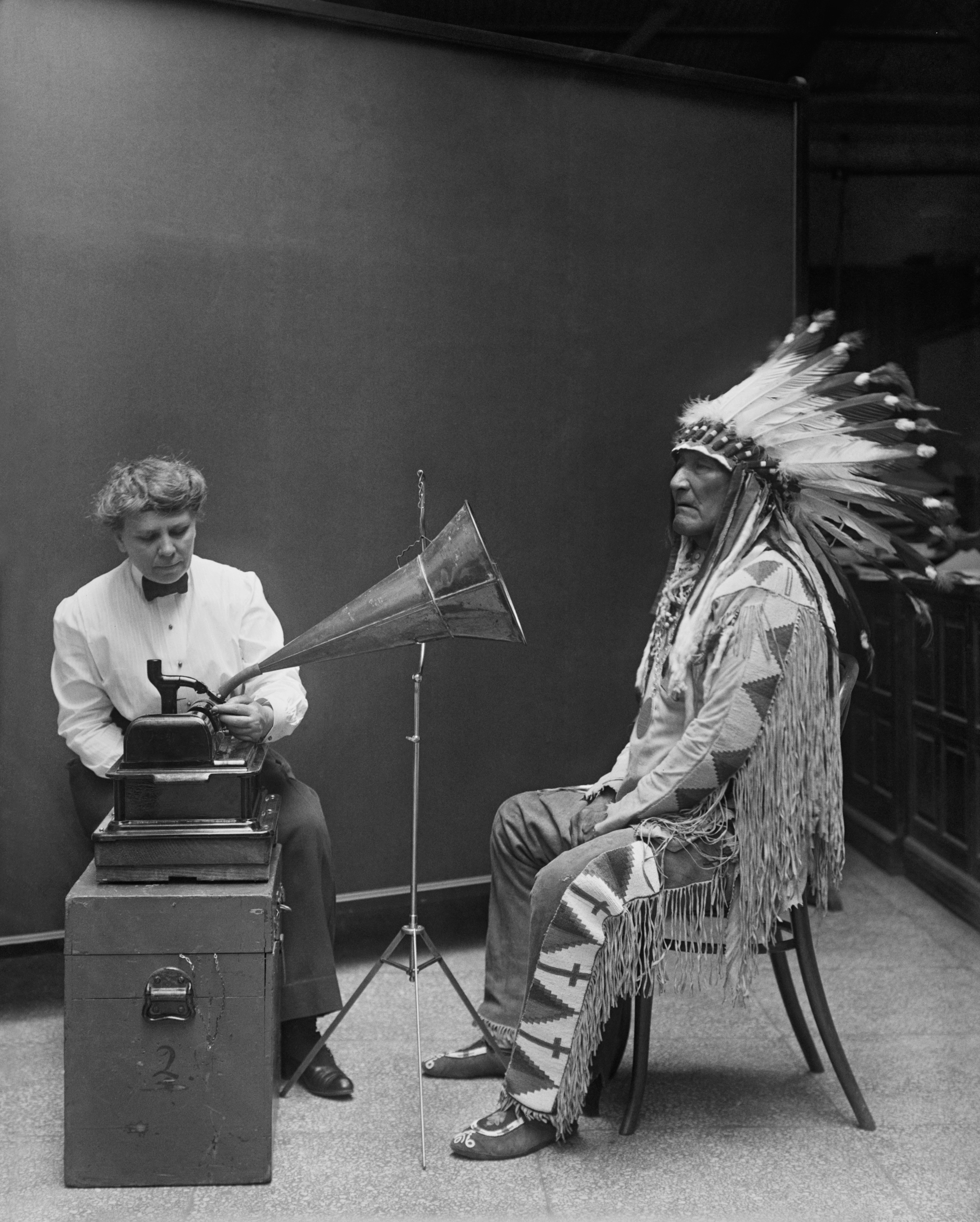
Mountain Chief listening to song being played on phonograph and interpreting it in Plains Indian Sign Language to ethnomusicologist Frances Densmore in 1916

Mountain Chief collaborated with researchers Walter McClintock, Joseph Kossuth Dixon, and Frances Densmore. During the summer of 1898, Yale graduate Walter McClintock visited the Blackfeet Reservation and used a wax cylinder phonograph to record tribal elders, including Mountain Chief. McClintock returned to the Blackfeet Reservation in 1903 and 1905 to take photographs of the Blackfeet community, including one photograph of Mountain Chief that appeared in his book The Old North Trail (1910).

Mountain Chief also appeared in Joseph Kossuth Dixon's book The Vanishing Race wearing an upright feather headdress with ermine fur and holding a horse efficacy. An account of Mountain Chief's childhood was included in Dixon's text as well. Dixon hoped to build a National American Indian Memorial at Fort Wadsworth on Staten Island overlooking New York harbor to memorialize what he termed the "first Americans." To create this memorial, Dixon gathered President William Taft, his cabinet members and military officers, the governor of New York, and 32 Plains Native Americans, including Mountain Chief, on February 22, 1913. During this meeting, Mountain Chief and the 32 other Plains Native Americans were photographed, and Mountain Chief gave a speech commending this goal but also criticizing the Administration of Indian affairs in the Blackfeet Indian Reservation. Dixon noted how "the nobility of his presence, the Roman cast of his face, the keen penetration of his eye, the breadth of his shoulders, the dignity with which he wears the sixty-seven years of his life, all conspire to make this hereditary chief of the Fast Buffalo Horse band of the Blackfeet preeminent among the Indians."

Mountain Chief appeared in many photographs beyond those included in McClintock and Dixon's books. One of the most widely used photographs of Mountain Chief depicts him interpreting a recording for Frances Densmore at the Smithsonian.

== Interpreting song recordings for Frances Densmore ==
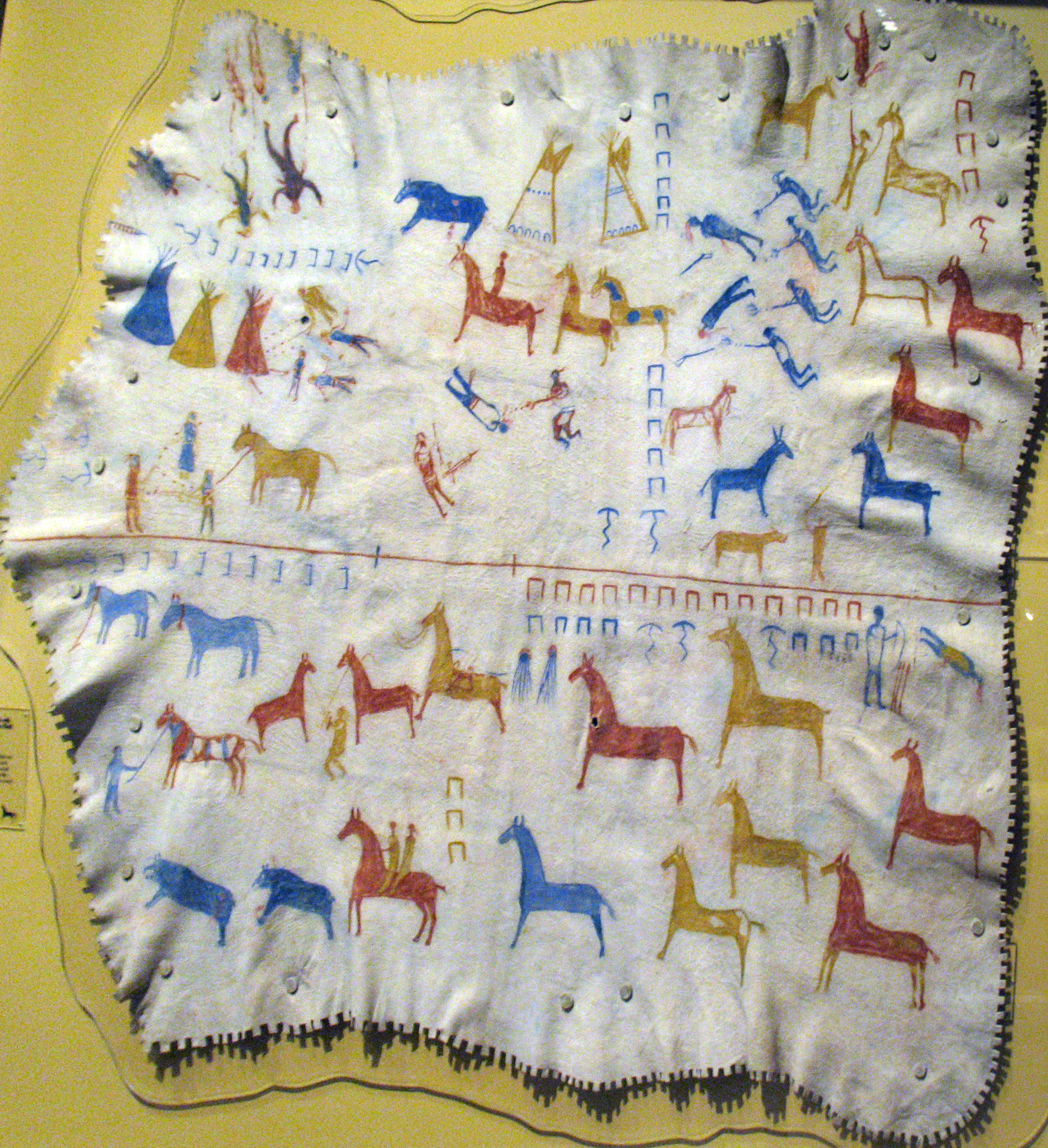
Elk-skin robe with painted decoration by Mountain Chief

In February 1916, Mountain Chief met with ethnomusicologist Frances Densmore at the Smithsonian Institution. Mountain Chief was interested in the preservation of Plains Indian Sign Language and consulted with General Hugh L. Scott at the Bureau of American Ethnology on Native American sign language. Mountain Chief later served as a tribal delegate at the Indian Sign Language Council in 1930. Gen. Scott recommended that Densmore meet with Mountain Chief, and the two initially met on February 8, 1916 to record songs. This first meeting between Densmore and Mountain Chief led to three different photographs capturing both Densmore and Mountain Chief listening to a recording played by an Edison phonograph inside and outside of the Smithsonian Castle. The meeting was photographed by Harris & Ewing, Inc., a photography studio in Washington, D.C., which operated from 1905 to 1945.

Mountain Chief was identified in this image because of the Plains Indian head covering he is wearing and by the "U" on his moccasins which identify him as Blackfeet. In this staged photograph, Densmore is playing a song on the phonograph, an Edison cylinder recorder, and Mountain Chief is interpreting the recording in Plains Indian Sign Language to Frances Densmore. By 1916, the cylinder recorder was largely abandoned for disks except for Edison which still manufactured cylinders, especially for ethnographers. Edison did however produce a disc phonograph as early as 1913, so the technology used in this photograph was largely outdated.

This image depicting Mountain Chief listening to and interpreting a recording has appeared in numerous ethnomusicology and anthropology texts. Densmore and Mountain Chief were featured as the cover image on the Healing Songs of the American Indians. Two books released by William Clements (1966) related to Native American poetry and Helen Myers (1993) related to ethnomusicology utilized this image but cropped out Densmore.

While Densmore has never been misidentified, Mountain Chief has been identified by other names and tribal affiliations or not identified at all. In Daughters of the Desert: Women Anthropologists and the Native American Southwest (1988), Barbara Babcock and Nancy Parezo recorded his name as "Big Brave." When the photograph appeared on the cover of the Folkways recording Healing Songs (1965), Mountain Chief was just referred to as an "Indian Singer." Hofmann (1968) and Babcock and Parezo (1988) also misidentified him as Sioux. In 2002, Victoria Levine's book Writing American Indian Music showcases Mountain Chief and Frances Densmore, stating that "Mountain Chief is using sign language to interpret recordings of American Indian songs played on a phonograph.

== Later life ==
Mountain Chief was the last hereditary chieftain of the Blackfeet Nation. He died at his home in Browning, Montana, on February 2, 1942, at a reported age of 94, and was buried in a Browning cemetery two days later. Mountain Chief's life was mentioned in oral histories included in James Willard Schultz's Blackfeet and Buffalo: Memories of Life among the Indians (1981).
