= Gustavus Cheyney Doane =

US Army officer and explorer (1840–1892)

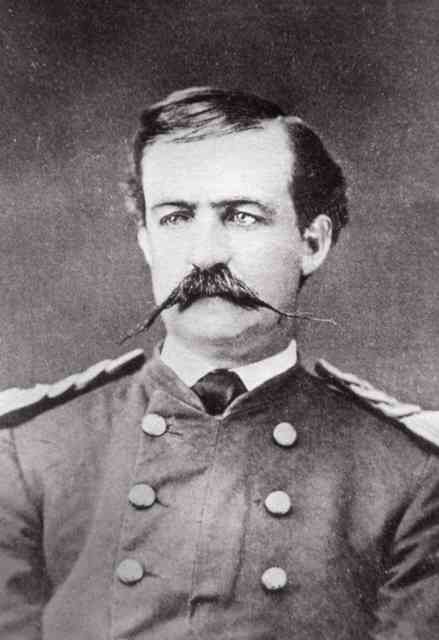
- Lt. Doane, 1875
- Born: May 29, 1840; Galesburg, Illinois, US
- Died: May 5, 1892 (aged 51); Bozeman, Montana, US
- Burial place: Sunset Hills Cemetery, Bozeman, Montana; 45°40′31.93″N 111°01′35.38″W
- Military career
- Branch: US Army
- Service years: 1862–1865, 1868–1892
- Rank: Captain
- Nickname: Gus
- Conflicts: American Civil War, Indian Wars

Gustavus Cheyney Doane (May 29, 1840 – May 5, 1892) was a U.S. Army Cavalry Captain, explorer, inventor and Civil War soldier who played a prominent role in the exploration of Yellowstone as a member of the Washburn–Langford–Doane Expedition. Doane was a participant in the Marias Massacre of approximately 200 Piegan Blackfeet people (mostly women, children, and old men).

== Early life ==
Gustavus Cheyney Doane was born in Galesburg, Illinois, the oldest of six children of Solomon Doane and Nancy Davis Doane. After a move to St. Louis, Missouri in 1844, the Doanes, with their one son Cheyney traveled west to Oregon Territory settling in Oak Grove, Oregon south of Portland in 1846. In May 1849 the Doanes, now with two sons, moved to Santa Clara, California to take up farming there. As a young boy growing up in California during the 1850s, Doane was heavily influenced by the exploits and writings of General John C. Fremont, explorer, Mexican-American War hero and California statesman. Gustavus C. Doane entered college at the newly created California Wesleyan College (now known as University of the Pacific) in Santa Clara in 1857, graduating first in his class in Latin, Greek and mathematics on June 13, 1861.

== Civil War and Reconstruction experiences ==
Desiring to participate in the American Civil War, in October 1862 after unsuccessful attempts at gaining an appointment to the U.S. Military Academy at West Point, a 22-year-old Doane volunteered at San Francisco for the 2nd Regiment of Cavalry, Massachusetts Volunteers known as the California 100. This group of volunteers, after paying their own way to Boston by ship from California, were inducted into the U.S. Army in January 1863. A month after his enlistment, Doane was made a sergeant and began seeing combat in actions around Washington, D.C. against forces of Confederate Colonel John S. Mosby, also known as the Gray Ghost.

In March 1864, Doane was transferred to the Mississippi Marine Brigade, Vicksburg, Mississippi as a first lieutenant. Although Doane's unit did see action with the enemy, he did not distinguish himself during this assignment. When it was dissolved in August 1864, Doane was transferred to an infantry regiment. Doane was honorably discharged from the Army in January 1865.

After a brief post-war stint in Illinois, Doane and some of his wartime associates returned to Yazoo City, Mississippi to establish a merchandising business. Initially successful because of the post-war boom, by late 1866 the sour post-war economy and poor business decisions resulted in bankruptcy. It was during this period that Doane met and married Amelia Link, the daughter of a wealthy southern landowner. Although Doane tried to make a living from Amelia's father's land, that too failed. In 1867, Doane tried his hand at politics in Mississippi, becoming Justice of the Peace and Mayor of Yazoo City for a short period of time. However, local politics and Reconstruction policies proved too much for Doane and he left Mississippi in May 1868 for Illinois, abandoning his business and political ambitions in Mississippi.

== Assignment to Fort Ellis and married life ==
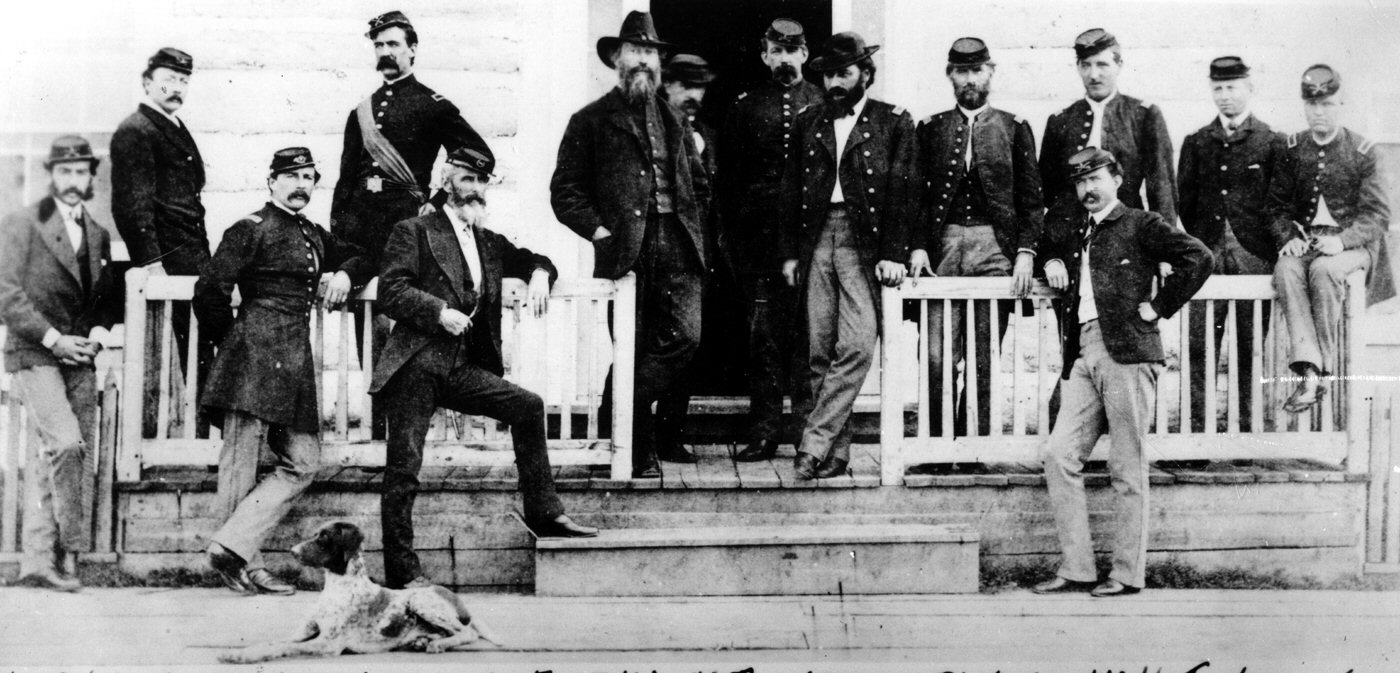
Officers at Fort Ellis, 1871 (Doane is 4th from left)

After his business and political failures in Mississippi, Doane again became a military officer. In the summer of 1868, through the good offices of a California senator, John Conness, Doane earned a commission in the U.S. Army 2nd Cavalry Regiment as a second lieutenant. After a year of uneventful training and scouting assignments at Fort McPherson, Nebraska and Fort Russell, Wyoming, Doane's cavalry unit was transferred to the newly created Fort Ellis, Montana Territory, near Bozeman, Montana. On July 1, 1869, Doane and his wife Amelia arrived at Fort Ellis. By the fall of 1869, Doane was given command of Company F, 2nd Cavalry at Fort Ellis.

In January 1870, Doane's company, along with others under the overall command of Major Eugene M. Baker, led an attack on a non-hostile Blackfoot Indian encampment on the Marias River in response to the alleged murder of a white fur trader. This engagement became known as the Marias Massacre.

In reality, Doane spent little time at Fort Ellis with his wife Amelia. By 1877 the frontier life at Fort Ellis and Doane's constant absence had severely strained their relationship. Gustavus and Amelia divorced in September 1878.

Doane wasted little time in remarrying. On December 16, 1878, Gustavus and 19-year-old Mary Lee Hunter of Hunter Hot Springs, Montana, were married in Helena, Montana, in a well-attended ceremony including the Territorial Governor, Benjamin F. Potts. She traveled with Doane widely to military posts in Montana, Arizona and California prior to his death. Mary Lee was the daughter of Dr. Andrew Jackson Hunter, formerly the camp physician at Fort Ellis. They remained married and together until Doane's death in 1892. Following Doane's death, Mary Lee Hunter Doane became an active member in many historical organizations including the Society of Montana Pioneers and the Daughters of the American Revolution, and was frequently referred to as an "encyclopedia of Montana history." She also formed a close friendship with Merrill G. Burlingame, a professor of history at Montana State College (now known as Montana State University). Hunter Doane died in 1952 in Bozeman, Montana never having remarried. Her collection of letters, notes, reminiscences, and photographs are housed at Montana State University's Archives and Special Collections.

== Yellowstone exploration ==
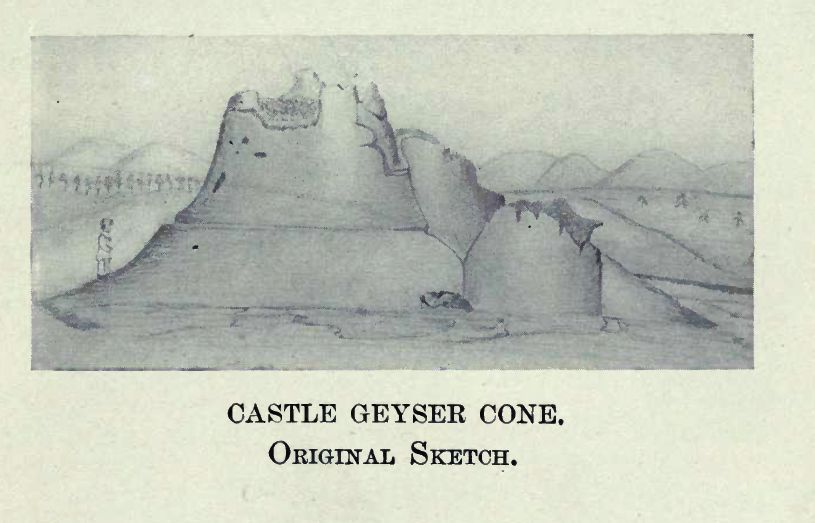
Original sketch of the Castle Geyser as discovered by the Washburn Expedition of 1870

In early August 1870, Henry D. Washburn in preparing for his Yellowstone exploration formally requested General Winfield Scott Hancock, Commander, Department of Dakota, provide a military escort from Fort Ellis. The request was granted on August 14, 1870, and Doane with five other soldiers were selected to provide the escort. As the leader of the U.S. Army escort of the Washburn–Langford–Doane Expedition into Yellowstone in August–September 1870, Lt. Gustavus C. Doane became a significant contributor to the process that ultimately resulted in the creation of Yellowstone National Park on March 1, 1872. Although he was skillful and resourceful throughout the expedition, it was his thorough and detailed report to the Secretary of War in February 1871 of the natural phenomena in Yellowstone that played a convincing role in the efforts to convince the U.S. Congress to create the National Park. The following excerpt is typical of Doane's detailed descriptions contained in his report:

Along both banks of the Firehole River are the greatest of the geysers. Our camp was a few hundred yards below the first crater described, and the most beautiful of them all. Near the bank of the river, and a half a mile below camp, rose on the farther margin of a marshy lake the Castle Crater, the largest formation in the valley. The calcareous knoll on which it stands is 40 feet in height, and covers several acres. The crater is built up from its center, with irregular walls of spherical nodules, in forms of wondrous beauty, to a castellated turret, 40 feet in height and 200 feet in circumference at the base. The outer rim, at its summit, is formed in embrasures between large nodules of rock, of the tint of ashes of roses, and in the center is a crater three feet in diameter, bordered and lined with a frost-work of saffron. From a distance it strongly resembles an old feudal tower partially in ruins. This great crater is continually pouring forth steam, the condensation of which keeps the outside walls constantly wet and dripping.

— Gustavus C. Doane, 1871

General Washburn named a mountain peak in the Absaroka Range for Lt. Doane that later became known as Colter Peak. However, in 1871 Hayden named another peak in Yellowstone as Mount Doane in his honor. In 2018, Native American leaders called for it to be renamed First Peoples Mountain, because Doane "led a massacre that killed around 175 Blackfeet people, and he continued to brag about the incident throughout his life". In June 2022 the U.S. Board of Geographic Names voted unanimously to change the name to First Peoples Mountain, as part of a Department of the Interior initiative to remove "derogatory names" from federal lands.

In his The Yellowstone National Park—Historical and Descriptive (1895), Hiram M. Chittenden praised Doane's expedition report:

His part in the Expedition of 1870 is second to none. He made the first official report upon the wonders of the Yellowstone, and his fine descriptions have never been surpassed by any subsequent writer. Although suffering intense physical torture during the greater portion of the trip, it did not extinguish in him the truly poetic ardor with which those strange phenomena seem to have inspired him. Dr. Hayden says of this report: "I venture to state, as my opinion, that for graphic description and thrilling interest it has not been surpassed by any official report".

== Other explorations ==
Doane was an explorer at heart and participated in or led several explorations while assigned to Fort Ellis and other posts. In September 1874, Doane the explorer, inspired by the reports of David Livingstone and Henry M. Stanley's adventures in Africa, proposed a Nile Survey to the Smithsonian. Of course Doane would lead this expedition. Throughout the winter of 1874–75, Doane sought support in Washington from both private and government entities. However, in February 1875, when the proposal reached Secretary of War William W. Belknap, it was turned down. Doane was deeply disappointed, but Belknap had been impressed by Doane the man and explorer. In July 1875 Belknap and a party of dignitaries visited Yellowstone for a two-week tour of the park. Belknap chose Doane from Fort Ellis to make the arrangements and guide the party through Yellowstone. They followed a course very similar to the Washburn expedition. This was Doane's third foray into the Yellowstone region.

=== Hayden Geological Survey of 1871 ===
During the summer of 1871, Doane participated in the military escort supporting the Hayden Geological Survey of 1871 of Yellowstone under the leadership of Ferdinand Vandeveer Hayden. This was Doane's second major foray into the Yellowstone region. Although Doane's pathfinding skills were praised by Hayden, the fact that the Hayden explorations, not the Washburn–Doane explorations of Yellowstone got most of the credit for the creation of the park caused a long lasting resentment by Doane. This resentment clouded Doane's judgment for years and was a direct contributor to the failed 1876 Snake River Expedition.

=== 1876 Snake River Expedition ===
In the fall of 1876, after a tedious summer dealing with the aftermath of the Battle of the Little Big Horn, Doane returned to Fort Ellis, restless for more exploration. All summer he had been planning an exploration of the Snake River regions south of Yellowstone. Doane believed this exploration would gain him the same type recognition that had been bestowed on Hayden for Yellowstone and on John Wesley Powell for the Grand Canyon explorations. Although he had permission to make the exploration from his superiors Colonel John Gibbon and General Alfred Terry whom he had courted during the summer campaign, Doane did this over the head of his immediate commander, Major James Brisbin, the post commander at Fort Ellis.

By all accounts, Doane's 1876 Snake River Expedition was ill-advised and an aborted failure. Doane planned to take his troop of soldiers over the Yellowstone plateau in early winter to begin the trip down the Snake River. With an ingeniously disassembled wooden boat on pack mules, Doane and his party traveled up the Yellowstone River from Fort Ellis eventually reaching Yellowstone Lake on October 24, well behind schedule because of deep snows and brutal cold. The boat proved difficult on Yellowstone Lake because of high winds and was partially wrecked and supplies were lost. The party did not get the boat to Heart Lake until November 7. The weather and cold were brutal and Doane's party did not make the next 20 miles down the Snake to Jackson Lake until December 7, 1876. By this time, they were critically short of supplies and began killing their stock for food. The boat proved unworthy in the Snake's whitewater and was eventually completely wrecked and abandoned. On December 15, 1876, Doane and his troop were near starvation and death when they arrived at a trapper's cabin on the Snake River. Eventually, they made Keenan City, Idaho and then Fort Hall, Idaho by January 4, 1877. By this time however, word of their condition had reached Major Brisbin at Fort Ellis and with permission from General Terry, Brisbin recalled Doane and his troops to Fort Ellis against Doane's wishes. They finally arrived there on February 2, 1877. Doane had put his troops in harm's way for his own ambition and almost created a tragedy. This was Doane's last foray into the Yellowstone plateau.

=== 1880 Howgate Arctic Expedition ===
In May 1880 Captain Henry W. Howgate of the U.S. Army Signal Corps was mounting an Army sponsored expedition to explore the North Pole. When Doane learned of this he applied for an assignment with the Howgate expedition which the Army granted. The 1880 Howgate Arctic Expedition was tasked with scientific and geographical exploration of Greenland in preparation for an 1881 International Polar Year expeditionary force and Arctic colonization. However, the Army and Navy decided, in June 1880, to withdraw support of the Howgate Arctic Expedition as the expeditionary vessel, the steamship Gulnare, was unseaworthy. Howgate, not to be deterred, found private funding. The expedition was to be based at Ellesmere Island off the coast of Greenland in preparation for further explorations of the polar regions.

The Gulnare departed in July, captained by Lt. Doane. On August 3, in a heavy gale, the Gulnare was damaged, but worse yet, it lost a deck boat and the entire deck load. The steamer reached Disko on August 8 and steamer repairs lasted through August 21 and the expedition was scrapped. Lt. Doane placed expedition failure upon the Gulnare and reported:

The cruise of the Gulnare is the first acknowledged failure in Arctic annals. We did but little, but left a great many things undone requiring some moral courage to refrain from doing. We did not change the names of all the localities visited, as is customary, nor give them new latitudes to the bewilderment of the general reader. We do not dispute anyone's attained distance nor declare it impossible that he should have been where he was. We did not hunt up nameless islands and promontories to tag them with the surnames ... We did not even erect cenotaphs ... We received no flags, converted no natives, killed no one ... The object of this report is to expose a few of the specious pleas, fallacious reasonings, and ill-grounded conjectures which are called scientific, and to place the subject of circumpolar exploration on a basis of facts and reasonable probabilities. One cannot explore the earth's surface from an observatory, nor by mathematics, nor by the power of logic. It must be done physically.

== Indian campaigns ==
Although Doane was involved with various Indian affairs and events for most of his U.S. Army career, he played a role in two major Indian campaigns and a peripheral role in the aftermath of another.

=== Battle of the Little Bighorn ===
In early 1877, Doane was placed in command of the Crow Indian scouts under the command of Colonel Nelson A. Miles. Working with the Crows, Doane was instrumental in gaining their allegiance to the U.S. Army during the Nez Perce campaign. Immediately after the ill-fated Battle of the Little Bighorn, Doane and his troop were instrumental in moving survivors of Major Marcus Reno's forces to safety and medical care. In June 1877, a year after the battle, Doane along with his troop of Crow Indian scouts and Lt Colonel Michael Sheridan visited the battleground to recover remains. Of the remains recovered was that of Colonel George Armstrong Custer, who was later buried at West Point.

=== Nez Perce War ===
In August and September 1877, Doane and his Crow Indian scouts played a key role in the ultimate capture of Chief Joseph and the Nez Perce during the Nez Perce War. Shortly after Chief Joseph's escape from the Battle of the Big Hole, the Nez Perce moved into Yellowstone. Doane and his scouts blocked their retreat down the Yellowstone River and forced Chief Joseph and the Nez Perce to escape east via the Clarks Fork Yellowstone River. This ultimately put the Nez Perce within striking distance of Colonel Miles's forces. Chief Joseph and the Nez Perce surrendered to Miles near the Canada–US border in October 1877.

=== Geronimo campaign ===
In September 1884, Lieutenant Doane was finally promoted to Captain Doane and transferred from Fort Maginnis, Montana to the Presidio, San Francisco. Life was good, relative to Montana, for the Doanes in California. However, in early 1885, a Chiricahua Apache, Geronimo, had gone off-reservation and began causing trouble in southern Arizona Territory. In December 1885, the Army, needing additional troops in the territory, assigned Doane's Company A from the Presidio and others to Fort Bowie, near present-day Willcox, Arizona, under the overall command of General George Crook and later in 1886, under the command of General Miles of the Plains campaigns. Doane's Company A eventually wound up at an outpost in the Dragoon Mountains near the Cochise Stronghold. From there, his company under the command of Second Lieutenant Lloyd M. Brett, got involved in an epic pursuit of Geronimo's forces. Doane did not participate because of personal reasons. In September 1886, Geronimo surrendered to General Miles and the campaign was over. By mid-October, Doane's company was back at the Presidio.

Doane's personal ambitions for involvement in the administration of Yellowstone were one of the casualties of this campaign. In August 1886, the Secretary of the Interior asked the U.S. Army to take over administration of the park to curb poaching and vandalism. Doane had long lobbied for such administration and hoped he would be an intimate part of it. However, because of funding reasons, the U.S. Army chose a troop from close by Fort Custer to take over the park in August 1886. Because he was in Arizona, Doane and his company were not considered for the job.

== Inventor ==
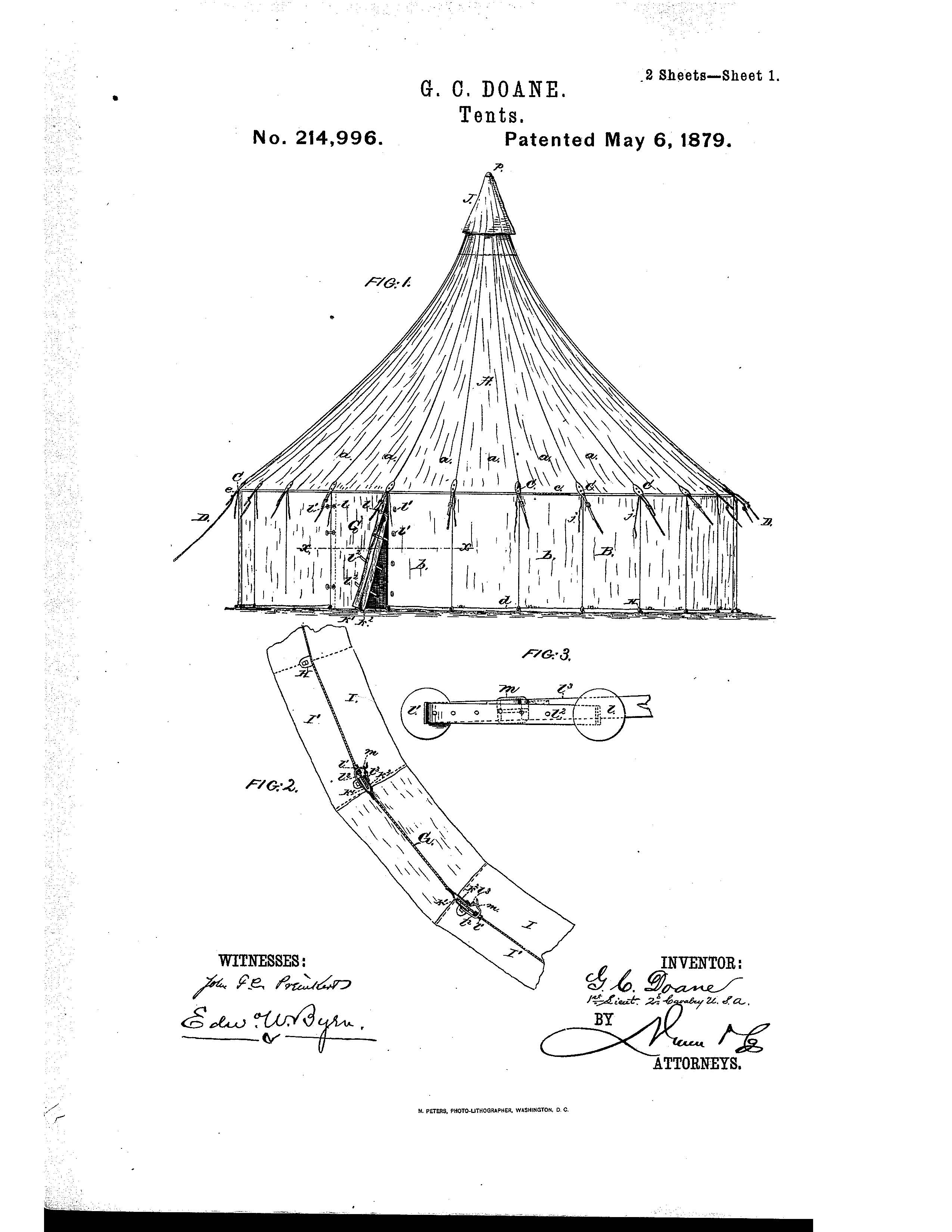
Centennial Tent Patent Image, May 6, 1879

In the later years of his life, Doane attempted to generate widespread support within the U.S. Army for his invention, the self-named Doane Centennial Tent. Doane was granted the patent for the Centennial Tent on May 6, 1879. He described his invention as "a new and Improved Army-Tent," While Doane attempted to receive endorsements from several branches of the Army, (including the infantry, cavalry and artillery) his efforts proved to be ultimately unsuccessful, as his tent design was never widely adopted within the United States Army. In a letter dated February 5, 1891, a First Lieutenant from the 3rd Artillery writes to Doane saying that the majority of his officers do not "entertain a preference " in regards to the use of one tent over another. The ambivalence and lack of tent preference expressed in this letter seems to be the common response to Doane's efforts to establish the Doane Centennial Tent as the foremost tent used by the U.S. Army during the latter half of the 19th century. His invention was never widely adopted.

== Yellowstone Superintendency campaign and death ==
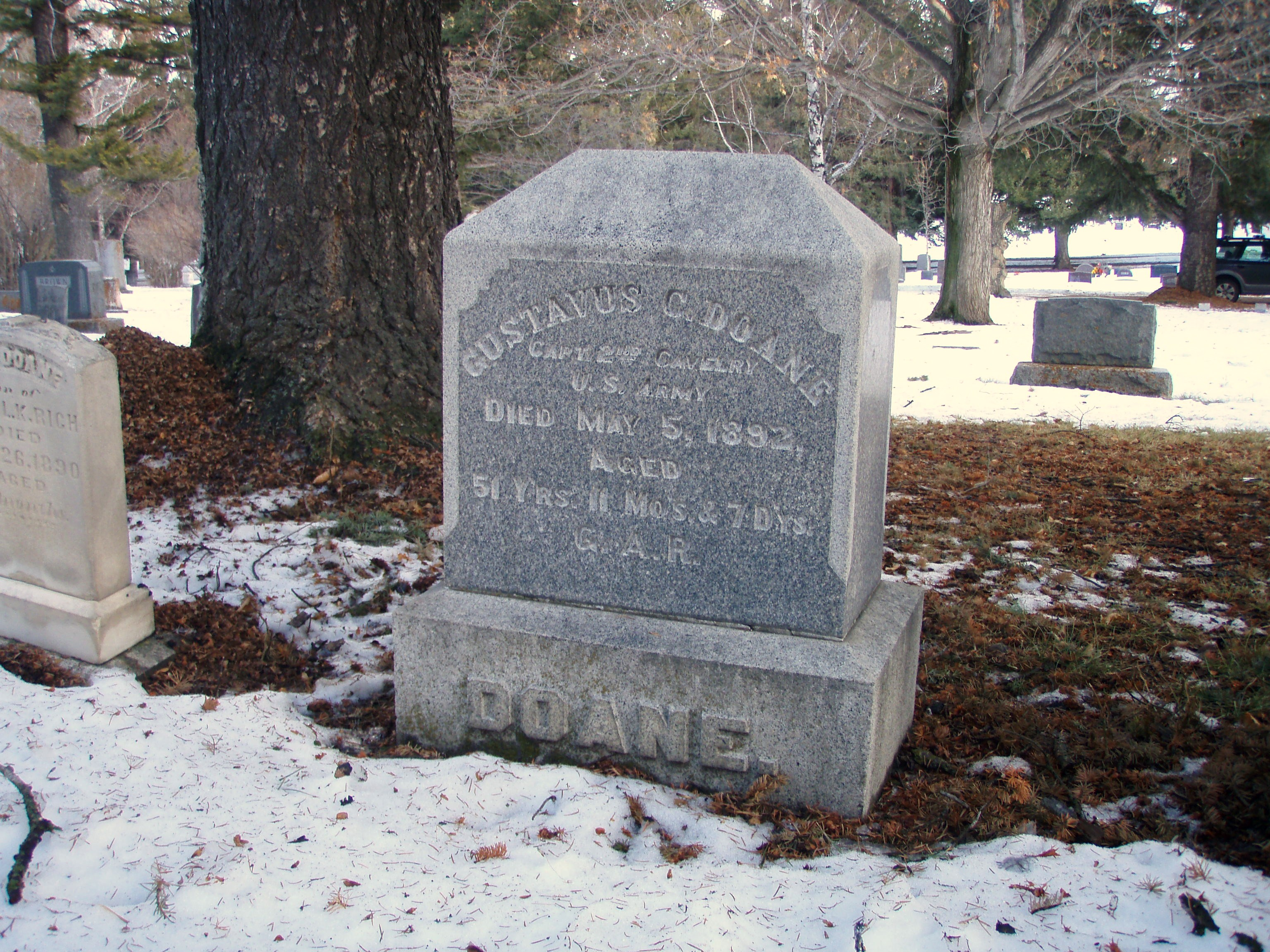
Gravestone

Throughout 1890 and 1891, Doane, while assigned to the Presidio in San Francisco and at Fort Bowie, Arizona Territory, made extensive personal and written appeals to U.S. Army and Montana authorities for him to be given the Superintendency of Yellowstone National Park. The U.S. Army never supported him in this endeavor, to his deep disappointment.

In February 1892, Doane returned to Bozeman, Montana, on six months medical leave awaiting his official retirement from the U.S. Army. He fell ill during an influenza epidemic in April and eventually died in his sleep from heart failure on May 5, 1892, in his Bozeman home. He was buried in Sunset Hills Cemetery in downtown Bozeman. He was mourned by hundreds of Gallatin Valley citizens who knew him as the explorer who discovered Yellowstone.

== Post Civil War assignments ==
- Fort McPherson, Nebraska – Boot Camp (August 1868)
- Fort Russell, Wyoming – Scouting (1868–1869)
- Fort Ellis, Montana – Indian battles, scouting and explorations (June 1869 – June 1879); Exploration reporting (September 1880 – June 1881)
  - Detached – St Paul, Minnesota – Department of Dakota headquarters (1871)
  - Detached – Fort Pease, Montana – Rescue operation (1876)
  - Detached – Fort Hall, Idaho – Exploration (1877)
  - Detached – Fort Keogh, Montana – Scouting (1877–78)
  - Detached – Fort Custer, Montana – Staked out new fort (June 1877)
  - Detached – Camp Mulkey, Idaho – Bannock Uprising (1878)
- Fort Assinniboine, Montana – Scouting (June 1879 – May 1880); (June 1881 – November 1882)
- Fort Maginnis, Montana – Scouting (November 1882 – September 1883)
- Jefferson Barracks, St Louis, Missouri – Recruiting – (1883–1884)
- Presidio, California (September 1884 – September 1885); (October 1886 – June 1890)
- Fort Bowie, Arizona Territory – Geronimo Campaign – (September 1885 – October 1886); Scouting (June 1890 – December 1891)

Summarized from Bonney (1970).
