= Eugene Mortimer Baker =

American army officer (1837–1884)

Major Eugene Mortimer Baker
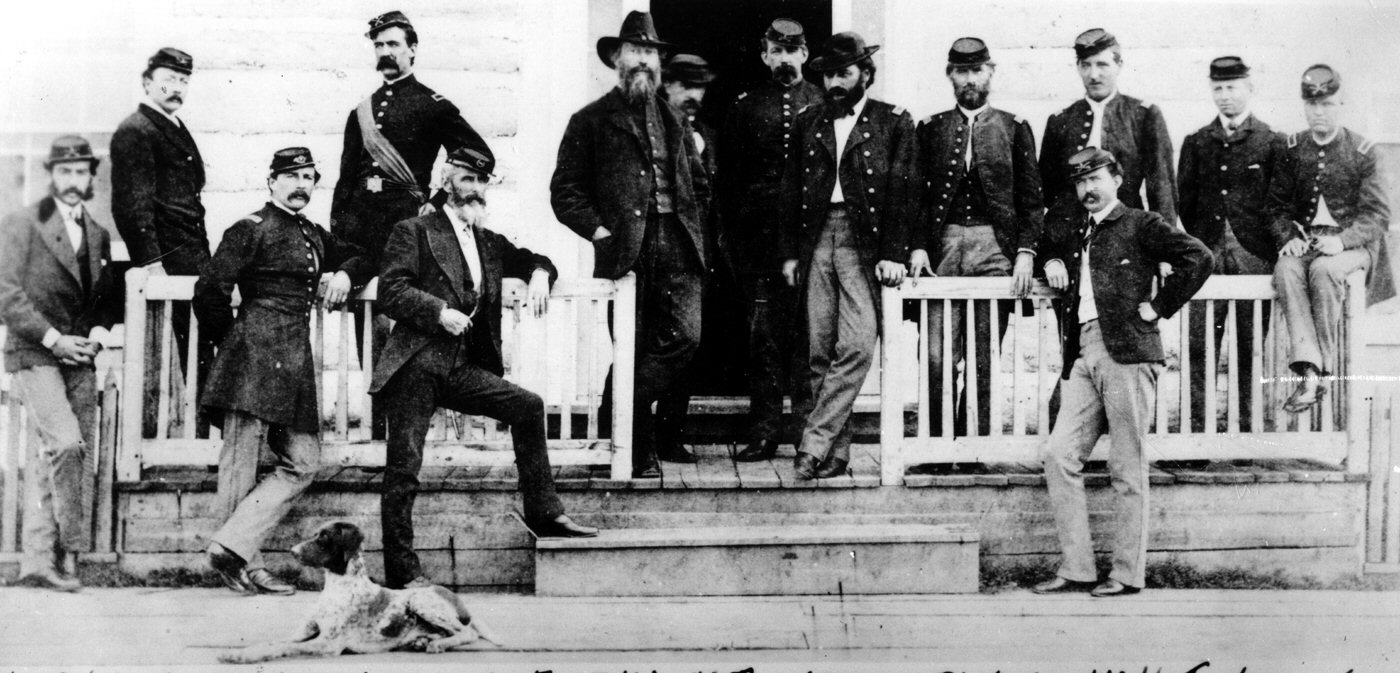
- Eugene Baker, ninth from left, pictured with other soldiers and officers stationed at Fort Ellis. Photo by Mr. William Henry Jackson in 1871.
- Born: July 7, 1837; Fort Ann, New York, US
- Died: December 19, 1884 (aged 47) Fort Walla Walla, Washington Territory, US
- Branch: United States Army: Union Army
- Rank: Colonel
- Known for: Commander of a battalion of the 2nd US Cavalry at the Marias Massacre (January 23, 1870)
- Conflicts: American Civil War; Siege of Yorktown; Battle of Williamsburg; Battle of South Mountain; Battle of Antietam; Second Battle of Rappahannock; Second Battle of Winchester; Battle of Gettysburg; Battle of Opequon; American Indian Wars; Marias Massacre
- Education: United States Military Academy

Eugene Mortimer Baker (July 7, 1837 – December 19, 1884) was a major in the United States Army, and served as an officer in the 2nd Cavalry Regiment in the Western Territories of the United States. He is most known for his role in the Marias Massacre in early 1870 and from the lack of discipline he faced following the event.

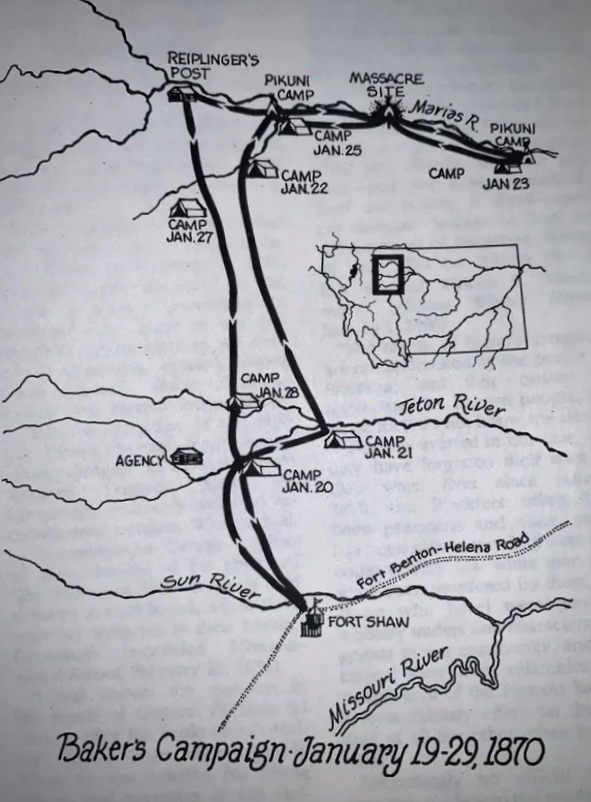
Major Eugene M. Baker's Marias River Campaign, Montana, January 19-29, 1870.

== Early life ==
Eugene Mortimer Baker was born in Fort Ann, New York, on July 7, 1837. He registered for military service at the age of 17 in 1854.

== Military career ==
=== Fort Ellis ===
In 1870, Major Eugene M. Baker was promoted to commanding officer of Fort Ellis in the Montana Territory and served in this post until 1873. This was to bolster his manpower to compensate for the winter campaign against Native Americans that he was put in charge of the previous year.

=== Marias Massacre ===
In late 1869, after several years of rising tensions between indigenous people and white colonists, a white rancher by the name of Malcolm Clarke was murdered by Peter Owl Child and several other Piegan Blackfeet Native Americans. This murder was at first dismissed as a familial dispute, but after the Helena Citizens Committee and the convening of a grand jury found that Native Americans in the Montana Territory had caused great loss to the white settlers, General Philip Sheridan planned offensive attacks against the Piegans in the winter. General Sheridan selected Major Baker to lead the expedition party into Blackfoot territory and gave him command of Fort Ellis. On January 6, 1870, Major Baker took over 200 infantry and 55 cavalry out of Fort Ellis and marched toward the Marias River. When the company came upon Chief Heavy Runner's camp, not the camp of Owl Child, they opened fire at dawn. Heavy Runner attempted to halt the attack by presenting documents to Major Baker, which Major Baker dismissed. Major Baker's men killed Heavy Runner and resumed their attack on the camp. Reports ranged the death toll to the Piegan Blackfeet somewhere between 150 and 300, among the casualties were women, children, newborns, and the elderly.

=== Post-Massacre ===
Reports of the actions of Baker and his force were contradictory, with Native American survivors claiming that they were brutally attacked without warning at dawn and the U.S. Army reporting that the conduct of the troops was commendable and that the Piegan Natives were repeatedly warned that their actions would lead to consequences. Major Alfred Bates, the writer of the chronicle of the Second Regiment, criticized the eastern press for holding Baker in negative esteem while simultaneously hailing Baker and his men as heroes. Baker and the Second Cavalry were active in the Montana Territory from 1870 to 1884, taking part in several more raids against Native Americans in the territory. In the summer of that year, the entire regiment was transferred to Fort Walla Walla in Washington Territory.

== Death ==
Baker died in Fort Walla Walla, Washington, on December 19, 1884, at the age of 47.
