= Eugene Baker =

Eugene Baker may refer to:

- Eugene Keith Baker (born 1976), American football player
- Eugene Mortimer Baker (1837–1884), American army officer
- Eugene Vanvoy Baker (c. 1854–1942), American football player and coach
- Eugene Walter Baker (1925–1999), American baseball player

== See also ==
- Wesley Eugene Baker (1958–2005), American murderer
- Jean Baker (disambiguation)
