= Helen P. Clarke =

American politician

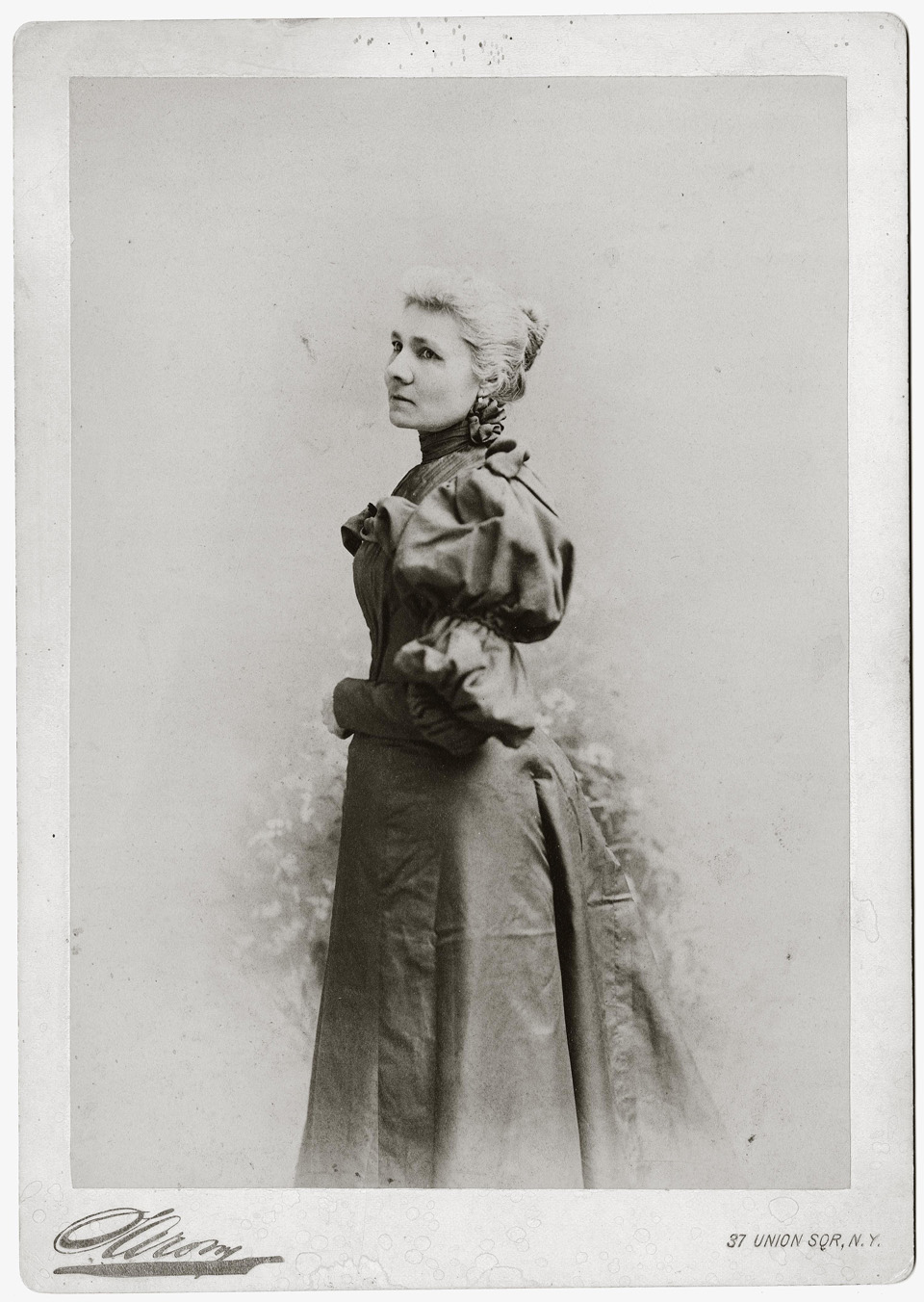
- Portrait of Clarke by Napoleon Sarony, c. 1895
- Born: c. 1846; The mouth of the Judith River, Montana
- Died: March 4, 1923; East Glacier Park Village, Montana

Helen Piotopowaka Clarke (c. 1846 – March 4, 1923) was a Piegan Blackfeet and Scottish American actress, educator, and bureaucrat who pioneered as a mixed-race woman in her fields, becoming one of the first women elected to public office in Montana.

== Biography ==
=== Early life ===
Clarke was born at the mouth of the Judith River, Montana. She spent her childhood in Cincinnati, attending a convent school and returned to Montana just "a few years before a group of Blackfeet men murdered her father in 1869." After her father's murder, she and her brothers filed a claim with the United States federal government claiming that Piegan Blackfeet had not only killed their father, but also confiscated $20,000 worth of horses and cattle.

During her childhood, people of mixed-ancestry worked as "brokers between white and natives worlds," but by the beginning of the twentieth century, this middle ground had disappeared, replaced with racial stratification.

=== Acting career ===
After her father's death, Clarke moved to Minneapolis to live with her aunt. Soon after, she moved to New York City to pursue a brief but impressive acting career. The roles she preferred were in antebellum-era plays including Meg Merrilies in Guy Mannering by Daniel Terry. She earned praise for her "wonderful, deep, thrilling voice, unusually deep and strong for a woman."

Unfortunately, the scrapbook that Clarke compiled to document her performances was lost in a fire in 1962. Clarke abandoned the stage and moved back to Montana by 1875.

=== Public Office ===
In 1882, Clarke was elected to the position of Superintendent of Public Instruction for Lewis and Clark County in Montana, making her the first woman in the state to be elected to public office. She won a second term in 1884 and a third in 1886.

In 1953, she was one of five pioneer educators honored by the Montana chapter of Delta Kappa Gamma, a national teachers' professional organization.

=== Allotment ===
President Grover Cleveland signed the General Allotment Act in February 1887. Clarke became a special allotting agent tasked with surveying and assigning plots to native individuals or families. President Benjamin Harrison signed her commission on October 4, 1890, making her the second woman and the only person of native ancestry to serve as allotting agent.

Clarke and her crew—a surveyor, interpreter, and one or two chainmen—finished allotting the Tonkawa reservation by the end of June 1891. She next worked with the Otoe-Missourias, but the work stalled when her gender fueled complaints that she was not a qualified agent. When the Blackfeet Reservation was allotted beginning in 1907, Helen was passed over for the job.

=== Death ===
Without a job as an allotment agent, Clarke secured her own plot on the Blackfeet Reservation, adjacent to the homestead of her brother Horace. Clarke died in East Glacier Park Village, Montana. Throughout her life, she had been hopeful that she would be judged on her actions, not her ancestry or gender. Instead, as writer Laura Ferguson put it, she found that "no matter how accomplished a woman was, no matter how assimilated a person of indigenous ancestry, early-twentieth-century America was largely still unwilling to let go completely of its prejudices against both women and Indians."

== See also ==
- List of Native American politicians
- Native American women in politics
