= Marias Massacre =

January 1870 killing of Native Americans by the U.S. Army in Montana

- Part of American Indian Wars
- Location: 48°23′41″N 111°39′19″W; Marias River, Montana Territory
- Date: January 23, 1870
- Target: Piegan Blackfeet
- Deaths: 173–217
- Perpetrator: United States Army
- Assailants: Major Eugene Mortimer Baker, U.S. Second Cavalry
- Motive: Manifest destiny, forced assimilation

The Marias Massacre (also known as the Baker Massacre or the Piegan Massacre) was a massacre of Piegan Blackfeet Native peoples committed by United States Army forces under Major Eugene Mortimer Baker as part of the Indian Wars. The massacre occurred on January 23, 1870, in Montana Territory. Approximately 200 Native people were killed, most of whom were women, children, and older men.

As part of a campaign to suppress Mountain Chief's band of Piegan Blackfeet, the U.S. Army attacked a different band led by Chief Heavy Runner, to whom the United States government had previously promised their protection. This resulted in public outrage and a long-term shift towards a "Peace Policy" by the Federal Government, as advocated by President Ulysses S. Grant. Grant kept the Bureau of Indian Affairs as a division of the Department of the Interior although the War Department was trying to regain control. He then appointed men recommended by various religious clergy—including Quakers and Methodists—as Indian agents, in hopes that they would be free of the corruption he had previously found in the department.

== Background ==
Relations between the Niitsitapi Confederacy (composed of Blackfeet, Blood, and Piegan tribes, although frequently referred to simply as Blackfeet) and white settlers in Montana Territory had been largely hostile for years, as European Americans encroached on Native American territory and resources. In turn, some Blackfeet stole horses and raided white settlements. Rather than a widespread, organized conflict, such as Red Cloud's War, a series of unrelated clashes marked the relations between the groups. By 1870, the Blackfeet had largely retreated north of the Marias River in the territory.

=== Malcolm Clarke ===
Malcolm Clarke was a rancher and fur trader who worked in association with the American Fur Company (AFC). Before his life in the West, Malcolm Clarke had attended West Point until he was expelled for fighting. During his time there, he became friends with classmate William Sherman, although they lost touch after he left school. Clarke found success trading with Blackfeet tribes and eventually married a Native woman named Coth-co-co-na and had four children—Helen, Horace, Nathan, and Isabel. This marriage served as an alliance between Malcolm and the Blackfoot tribe, prolonging his fur trade with the tribe.

Clarke frequently argued with prominent AFC member Owen McKenzie throughout his trading career. This interpersonal conflict ultimately led to Clarke murdering McKenzie. After the murder, Clarke left the fur trading business out of fear of retribution from other traders, as well as the decline of the fur trade during the 1860s due to the dwindling population of bison. Clarke then moved his family to the Rocky Mountains and undertook ranching with his second wife, a mixed-race Blackfoot woman named Good Singing. They established the Clarke Horse and Cattle Ranch in 1864.

=== Murder of Malcolm Clarke ===
The inciting incident of the Marias Massacre was the murder of Malcolm Clarke on August 17, 1869. He was killed by Owl Child—a young Piegan warrior—and his comrades at the Clarke Ranch. Two years prior, in 1867, Owl Child had stolen horses from Clarke as payback for losing his horses, which he blamed on the trader. Consequently, Clarke and his son, Horace, beat and humiliated Owl Child in front of a group of Blackfeet. There were accounts from Blackfeet claiming Clarke had also raped Owl Child's wife, who was a cousin of Coth-co-co-na. Other Blackfeet oral histories state that Owl Child's wife became pregnant from the assault, and gave birth to a child who was either stillborn or killed by tribal elders. The Piegan warriors first shot and severely wounded Horace, who survived. They then proceeded to the house, where they shot Clarke in the chest before Owl Child ultimately killed him with an ax. Clarke's other children and his wife took shelter in the house unharmed.

Clarke's murder created a climate of unrest in the region, as outraged white settlers demanded that the government protect them and suppress the outlaw Blackfeet. In response, the U.S. Army demanded that the Blackfoot Confederacy execute Owl Child and deliver his body to them in two weeks. Owl Child fled North and joined Mountain Chief's Piegan band, which, although known for their hostility toward white settlers, did not conduct raids on the settlements.

When the two-week deadline had passed, General Philip Sheridan sent a squadron of cavalry from the Second Cavalry Regiment, led by Major Eugene Baker, to track down and punish the offending party. Sheridan ordered:

If the lives and property of the citizens of Montana can best be protected by striking Mountain Chief's band, I want them struck. Tell Baker to strike them hard.

Sheridan intended that the squadron conduct a dawn attack on the Piegan village; it had snowed heavily, and most of the Blackfeet would be sleeping or staying inside to keep warm. This was a strategy he had used before, as he had directed George Custer to attack Black Kettle's band of Cheyenne in the Battle of Washita River. Following their father's death, Nathan and Horace Clarke intercepted the Second cavalry as they passed through the Prickly Pear Valley and received permission from Colonel Philippe Regis de Trobriand to join the expedition. The two sought revenge for their father and made their expedition known to the press.

== The massacre ==
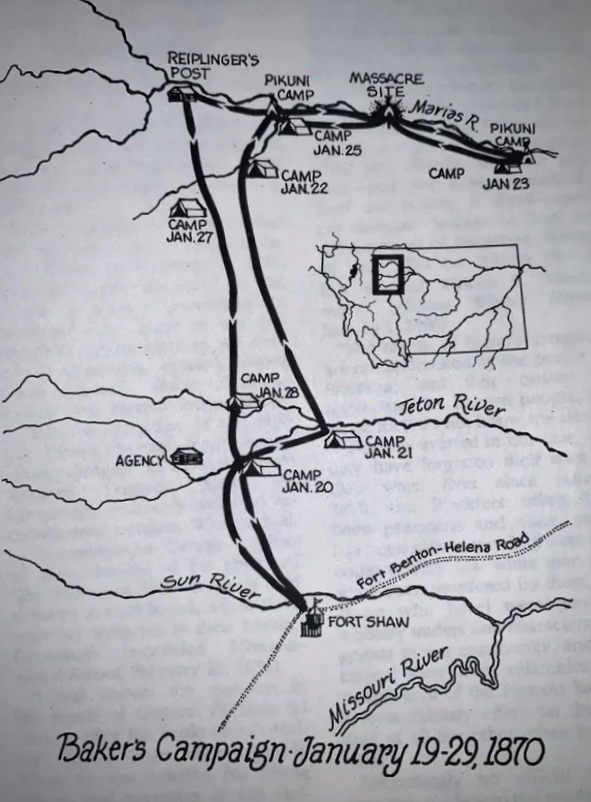
Major Eugene M. Baker's Marias River Campaign, Montana, January 19-29, 1870.

A command led by Major Eugene M. Baker left Fort Ellis on January 6, 1870, and stopped at Fort Shaw to pick up two more companies, including scouts Joe Kipp and Joseph Cobell who were familiar with the Piegan bands. These scouts were critical to distinguishing between the unfriendly and friendly Piegan bands, as Baker was to refrain from attacking the friendly bands. Baker needed to wait until Sheridan's division inspector general Colonel James A. Hardie reviewed the situation and reported back to him.

Based on Hardie's January 13 report, Sheridan issued an order to "strike them hard". Baker's command, consisting of four companies of the 2nd U.S. Cavalry, and 55 mounted men of the 13th U.S. Infantry, moved North from Fort Shaw on January 19, looking for Mountain Chief's band, which was purportedly located in the Marias River country.

Baker's command came across a small Piegan camp on January 22 and captured the occupants. These prisoners informed Baker that the Big Horn and Red Horn camps—two Piegan leaders considered hostile—could be found a few miles downstream. Baker ordered a forced march that night and moved his mixed infantry and cavalry forces through rough country, locating a camp of 32 lodges in the low ground along the Marias River just South of present-day Dunkirk, Montana. Baker positioned his men on the high ground above the camp in a "natural firing range" and prepared to attack.

=== The camp ===
More than three hundred Piegan people were sleeping in Heavy Runner's camp in the predawn hours of January 23. Smallpox had struck, and many people were suffering from the disease. Most of the healthy men had left the camp to hunt. So, on that bitterly cold morning, nearly all the camp's occupants were women, children, or elderly.

=== The shooting ===
Scout Joe Kipp recognized that the camp belonged to Heavy Runner, considered peaceful and not to be attacked per orders from Fort Shaw commander Colonel Philippe Régis de Trobriand. When told that the camp belonged to Heavy Runner, Baker responded, "That makes no difference, one band or another of them; they are all Piegans [Blackfeet] and we will attack them." Baker then ordered a sergeant to shoot Kipp if he tried to warn the sleeping camp of Blackfeet and gave the command to attack. Kipp shouted to try to prevent the attack, and Baker placed him under arrest.

The noise alerted the Piegan camp and Chief Heavy Runner. Heavy Runner ran toward the soldiers, "shouting and waving a piece of paper—a safe conduct from the Indian Bureau." He was immediately shot and killed. Scout Joseph Cobell later took credit for shooting Heavy Runner. Cobell was married to the sister of Mountain Chief and wanted to divert attention from his brother-in-law's camp, which he knew was about 10 miles (16 km) downstream. After Cobell's first shot, the rest of Baker's command opened fire.

From the ridges above the camp, the soldiers shot into lodges filled with sleeping people. After a while, they charged into the camp. William Birth of Company K boasted that they sliced open lodge coverings with butcher knives and shot the unarmed people inside. He said: "We killed some with axes" and "gave them an awful massacreing. [sic]"

=== Survivors' accounts ===
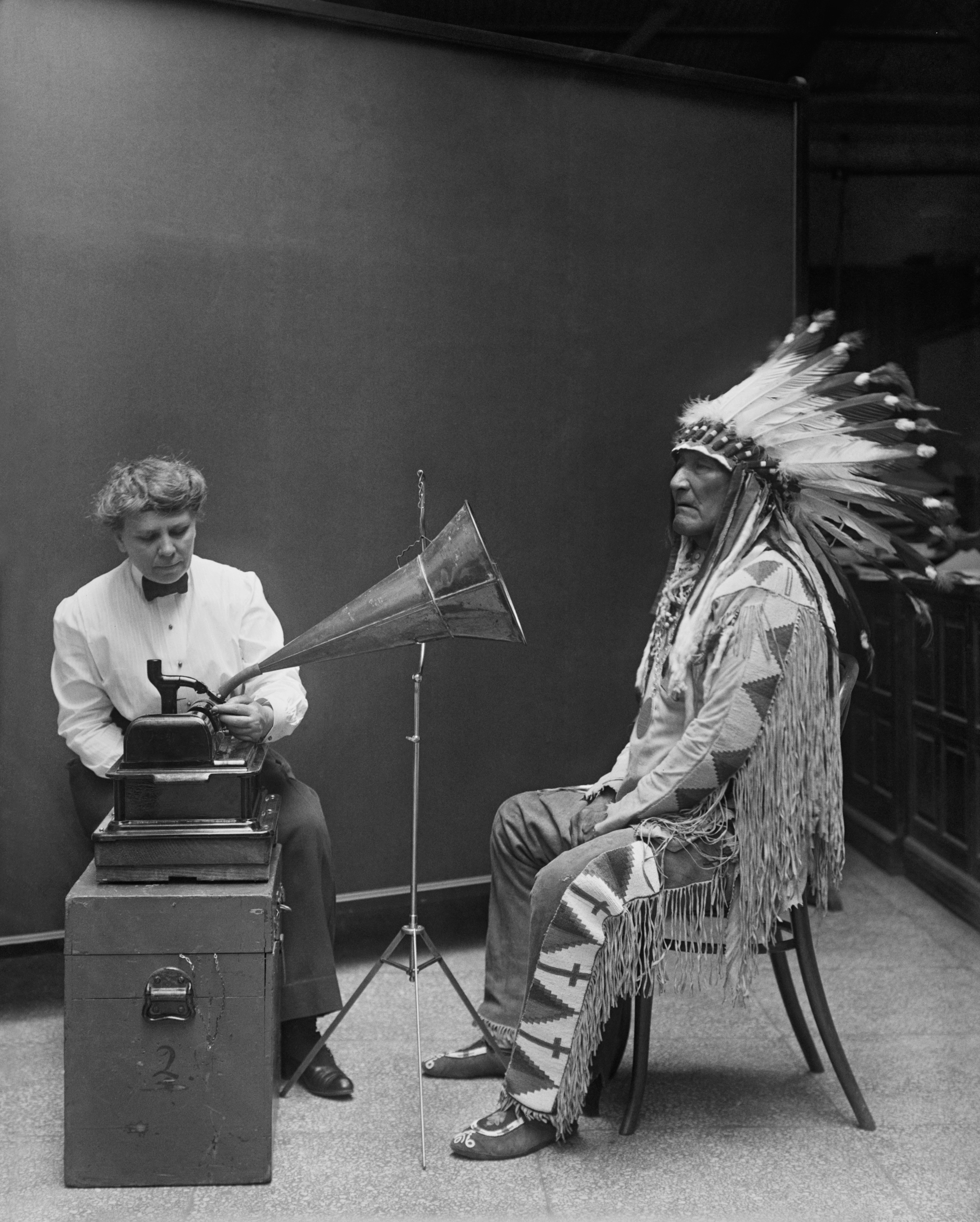
Frances Densmore at a recording session with Blackfoot chief, Mountain Chief, in 1916

Spear Woman was six years old at the time of the massacre. She remembered waking up to the noise of barking dogs. She watched Heavy Runner run toward the troops, holding his "name paper" above his head. Then the soldiers began shooting. She ran into a nearby lodge and hid behind a bed backrest. While she waited, soldiers moved from lodge to lodge, killing her people. One soldier cut a hole in the lodge where she hid and shot everyone who moved.

Buffalo Trail Woman saw soldiers surround a lodge and shoot into it in unison. They then took blankets, robes, and anything else they wanted. Finally, they tore down all the tipis and set everything on fire. She saw them burn wounded people in the conflagration.

Long Time Calf escaped through the freezing waters of the Marias River, carrying her infant niece. She was eight years old.

Bear Head had gone out of the camp to catch his horses when he encountered soldiers. They took him prisoner. He saw Heavy Runner run toward the soldiers, waving a paper, and then fall as the troops opened fire. He saw soldiers shoot at the tops of lodges, cutting the bindings and collapsing them onto the fire so that they smothered and burned their occupants. He watched them do this to the lodge of his mother, Fair Singing Woman, killing her and his father's three other wives and their four daughters. He saw them tear down all the remaining lodges, shoot the occupants, and burn everything, bodies, and lodges together. Powerless to save his family, Bear Head wished the soldiers had killed him, too. After the soldiers left, a few people returned to the camp from their hiding places in the brush. They buried the dead as best they could. Bear Head counted fifteen men, ninety women, and fifty children dead.

== Aftermath ==
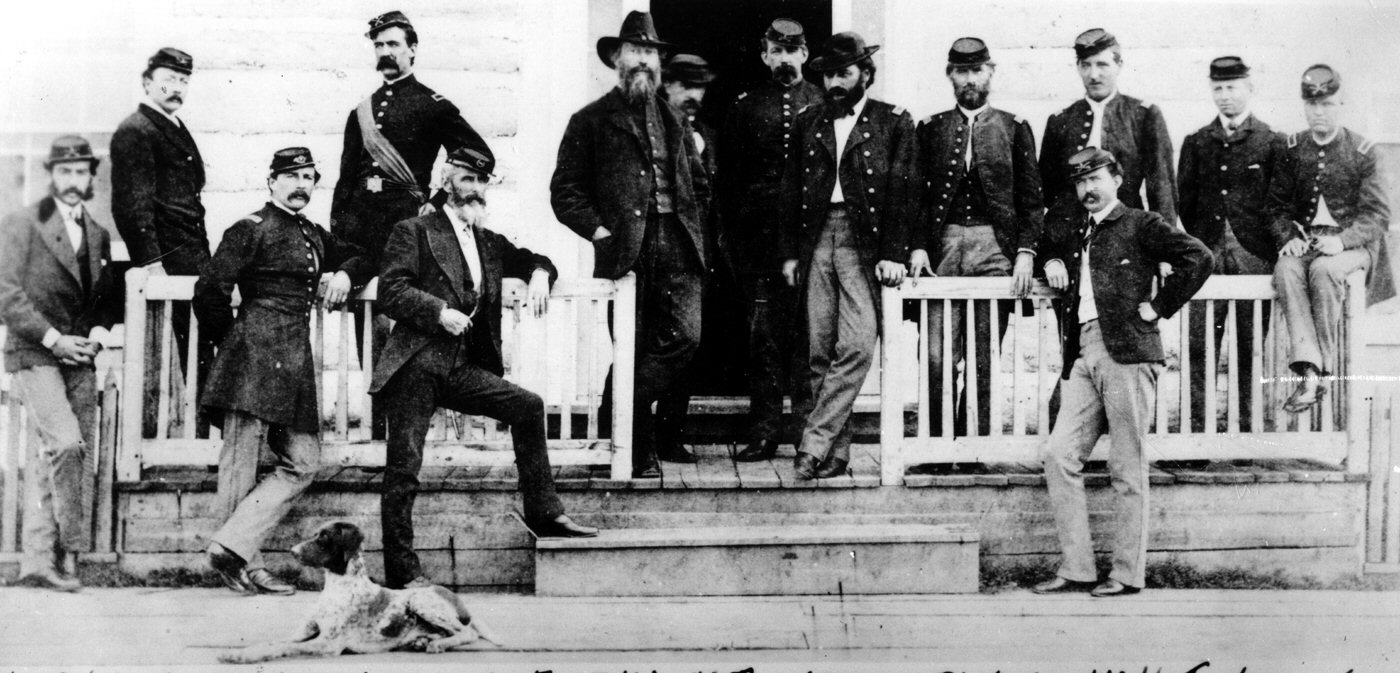
Ninth from left Eugene M. Baker and group of army officers at Fort Ellis, Montana Territory 1871.

Learning of the raid, Mountain Chief's band escaped over the border into Canada. Piegan oral history recounts that the U.S. Army threw every dead Native American man into a fire. A rough count by Baker's men showed 173 dead. Only one cavalryman, Private McKay, was killed, and another soldier was injured after falling off his horse and breaking his leg. The count of casualties was disputed by scout Joe Kipp, who later said the total Blackfeet dead numbered 217.

=== Conflicting reports ===
Colonel Regis de Trobriand reported to his superior officers on the success of the expedition, informing them that the "murderers, and marauders of last summer" had been killed. Sheridan received de Trobriand's initial report on January 29, which was then forwarded to Sherman with the promise that "this will end Indian troubles in Montana." Sheridan also praised Baker's command: "The lieutenant-general cannot commend too highly the spirit and conduct of the troops and their commander and as one of the results of this severe but necessary and well-merited punishment of these Indians, he congratulates the citizens of Montana upon the prospect of future security." However, de Trobriand needed to explain why Baker had attacked the wrong camp. So, he implied that Baker had attacked a "hostile" camp and that Heavy Runner had been killed by "his own fault" because he had left the safety of the trading post in search of whiskey. According to de Trobriand, Mountain Chief had fled the camp with his followers.

Baker filed his official report on February 18. In it, he claimed that he and his men had killed 173 Indians and had captured more than 100 women and children who were later allowed to go free. He also reported capturing more than 300 horses and burning the Piegans' lodges and supplies.

Blackfeet agent William B. Pease reported the massacre to his superior, Alfred Sully, on January 30 after interviewing the expedition's officers. Sully ordered Pease to interview survivors of the massacre. Based on his interviews with officers and survivors, Pease reported a death toll of eighteen older men, ninety women, and fifty children. According to Pease, only fifteen young men aged twelve to thirty-seven were killed. Pease further reported fifty-one Blackfeet survivors: eighteen women, nineteen children, nine young men who had escaped, and five men who had been out hunting at the time of the attack.

Pease's report sparked public outcry. Vincent Colyer, the secretary to the Board of Indian Commissioners and a noted humanitarian, wrote a letter to board chairman Felix Brunot alerting him to Pease's claim that only 15 men of fighting age had been killed; in contrast, the rest had been women, children, and elderly. The New York Times published the letter, it was read in the House of Representatives, and news of the massacre spread nationwide. In retaliation, de Trobriand accused Pease of slander and claimed that he had filed a false report. Pease responded by demanding a full investigation to explain the discrepancy between the military and the Piegans' versions of events.

When General Sherman received Baker's initial report, he ordered him to give a complete account, including "exactly the number, sex, and kind of Indians killed." Sherman wanted "to meet the public charge that of the number killed the greatest part were squaws and children." In response, Baker claimed that his men had killed 120 "able men" and 53 women and children. He also reported capturing 140 women and children who were later released because of smallpox. Baker claimed, "I believe that every effort was made by officers and men to save the non-combatants, and that such women and children as were killed were killed accidentally." Sherman's order to specify the age, sex, and condition of those killed was ignored. Baker's reports became the official military record.

The army justified Baker's attack and portrayed him as a hero. De Trobriand claimed that many of the Piegan women had been killed by their husbands to protect them "from tortures among the white men which are inflicted upon white women when captured by those Red fiends." Major General Winfield Scott Hancock claimed that it was necessary for the troops to "fire into the lodges at the outset to drive the Indians out to an open contest." Hancock also claimed that fewer than forty women and children had been killed. The Army and Navy Journal editorialized that "Colonel Baker's report of his scout against the hostile Piegan and Blood Indians shows incontestably that the march itself was a heroic one." The editorial further explained that it "was not known how strong the Indians might be, and huddled as they were indiscriminately in the camp, the first fury of the attack fell alike on all ages and sexes." The editorial surmised that the warriors "it seems, fled; at all events, the great majority of those left were women and children."

When the Inspector General of the Military Division of the Missouri, James Allen Hardie, asked de Trobriand how they could be certain of the number, age, sex, and condition of the people killed, de Trobriand responded that "Baker never know the state, age, sex or condition of the Indians he killed. How could he?" De Trobriand deflected further questions by raising his estimates of casualties to 220 killed, of which 70 were warriors. This claim contradicted Baker's earlier reports and implied 150 non-combatant deaths. Still, de Trobriand stated that the attack was a "complete success." When Hardie ordered de Trobriand to interview guides Horace Clarke and Joe Kipp and mail their testimonies to him, de Trobriand ignored the order.

For his part, guide Joe Kipp claimed that he had counted 217 casualties, mostly older men, women, and children. He also claimed that Baker was drunk on the morning of the attack. When writer Frank Bird Linderman requested an interview for a story, Kipp refused because the military would hang him if he told what he knew about the massacre.

=== Impact on the Blackfeet ===
The conflict between settlers and the Blackfeet declined after the massacre. The Blackfoot Nation, weakened by smallpox, did not have the numbers to retaliate and feared the white settlers as a brutal people. Baker's attack facilitated the dispossession of the Blackfeet Nation. At the time of the massacre, the Blackfeet Reservation stretched across most of northern Montana. In 1872 and 1873, President Grant issued executive orders reducing the size of the reservation. In 1887, Congress passed the Dawes Act, which stripped an additional 17 million acres from the Blackfeet.

=== Impact on Baker's career ===
Many blamed Major Baker for the massacre, the failure to capture Mountain Chief's band, and the failure to report the massacre's scale accurately. The news that many in the camp had been suffering from smallpox added to the outrage about the army's attack on non-combatants. Despite the subsequent controversy, General Sheridan expressed his confidence in Baker's leadership while struggling to protect the U.S. Army politically. He succeeded in preventing an official investigation into the incident. Following the Marias Massacre, Baker was widely viewed as a strong military commander and was selected to command Fort Ellis by General Sheridan. At Fort Ellis, Baker was in command of surveying expeditions into Yellowstone in 1871 and 1872, culminating in a skirmish between his forces and Indian warriors led by Sitting Bull at Pryor's Creek on August 14, 1872. Baker was later arrested by General Hancock for drunkenness in October 1872. He was never charged but was relegated to purchasing horses for the army. Baker died at age 47 on December 19, 1884, at Fort Walla Walla, Washington; a January 1885 obituary listed his cause of death as "general debility."

=== Impact on the Clarke family ===
As an interracial family, the Clarkes struggled to find their place in both white and Native communities. In the latter years of his life, Horace Clarke would say the two central events of his life were the murder of his father and the military campaign that followed. As a result of his role in the campaign, he would be haunted by visions of Indians while traveling in Canada. Much of his life was spent repressing memories of the slaughter and attempting to forget the details of that day. Horace—who was half-Indian—was ultimately pardoned for his role in the massacre by the Native community, who viewed his participation as justified by a desire to avenge his father and because of his social and economic standing in the community.

Nathan Clarke was "stabbed to the heart" on September 19, 1872 in Deep Creek, Montana by James Swan, a Métis man. Clarke's death was reported in the Helena Weekly Herald with the cause: "Clark wanted Swan's daughter, to which both Swan and the girl objected." Andrew Graybill's The Red and the White portrays Clarke's stabbing as an expression of the "self-loathing" of "some people of mixed ancestry," asserting that James Swan preferred his daughter marry "a white man." This accusation lacks credibility, given the Swan family's hosting of Louis Riel at their home during his time in Montana and the family's subsequent participation in the North-West Resistance. The daughter in question was likely Adelaide Swan, as she married Alexandre Azure (a Métis man) on November 26, 1872.

=== Historical significance ===
Sheridan had been attempting to replace Indian agents with military personnel, as he believed that they could better control the Indians. Sheridan reported to Congress that he could save the government $3.5 million in annual transportation costs alone. Although the Army Appropriation bill in 1870 allowed Sheridan to take over Indian affairs, his involvement in the massacre prevented him from advancing. Following the massacre, President Ulysses S. Grant adopted a "Peace Policy." and ended discussions about returning control of Indian affairs to the U.S. Army. In an attempt to raise the quality of appointees, Grant appointed as Indian agents numerous Quakers and other persons affiliated with religious groups.

== Order of battle ==
United States Army, Major Eugene M. Baker, commanding.

2nd United States Cavalry Regiment

- Company F, Second Lieutenant Gus Doane.
- Company G.
- Company H.
- Company L, Captain Lewis Thompson.

13th United States Infantry Regiment

- Mounted Detachment, 55 men.

Native Americans, Heavy Runner.

Piegan Blackfeet

- About 230, mostly unarmed women and children.

== Legacy ==
- For many years, students and faculty from Blackfeet Community College have held an annual memorial on January 23 at the site. One year they placed 217 stones at the site to commemorate the victims, as counted by Joe Kipp.
- In 2010, the Baker Massacre Memorial was erected at the site.

== In popular culture ==
- Fools Crow, a novel written by Native American writer James Welch, culminates with the Marias Massacre.
- Fair Land, Fair Land, a novel written by A. B. Guthrie Jr., also ends with the Massacre.
- Gustavus Cheyney Doane was honored for participation in the first geological survey of what became Yellowstone National Park by naming one of the peaks "Mount Doane". The mountain was renamed in 2022 to First Peoples Mountain.
- The Massacre is a major plot point in the 2025 novel The Buffalo Hunter Hunter by Blackfeet author Stephen Graham Jones.
