= First Peoples Mountain =

Mountain in the state of Wyoming

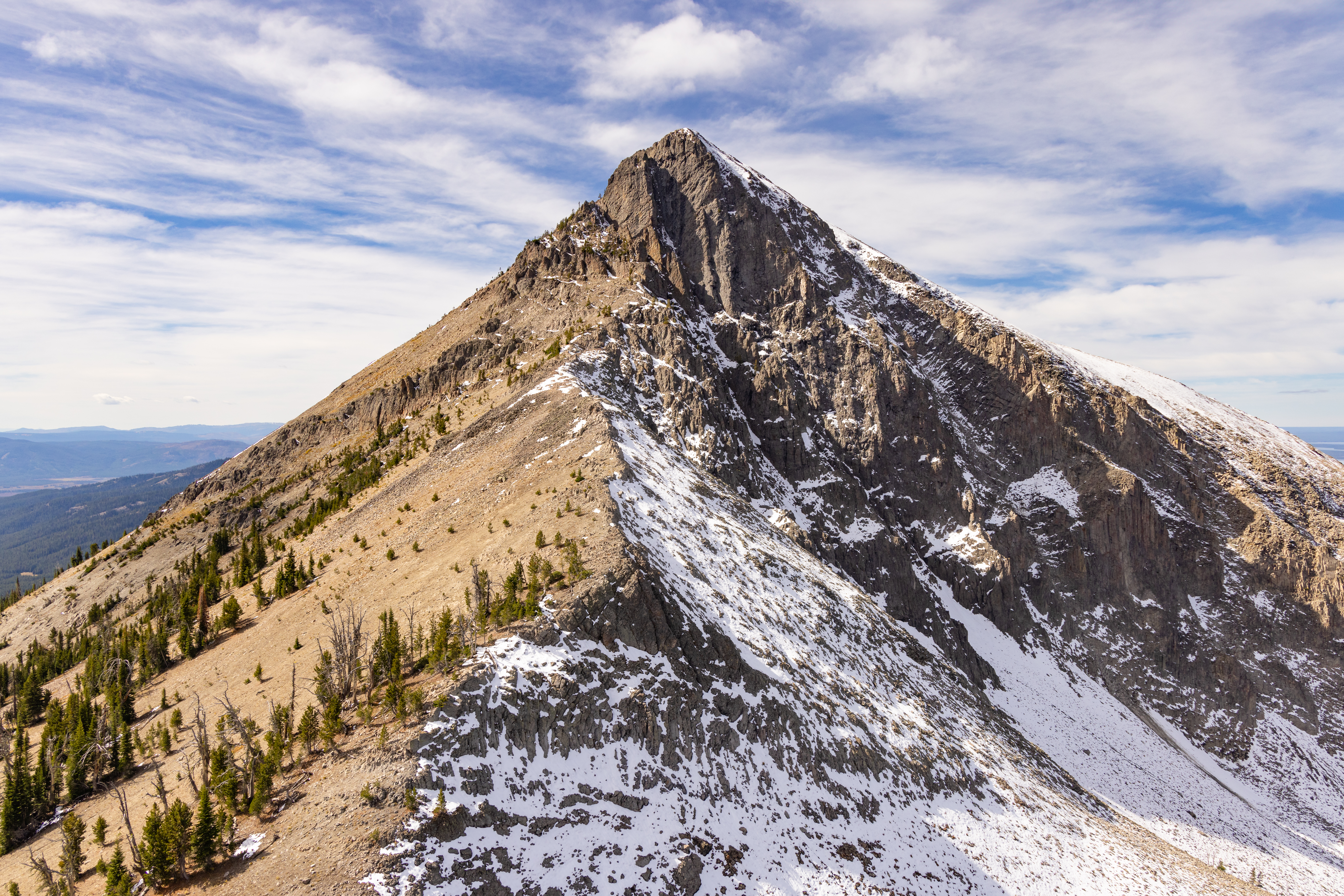
- East-northeast aspect

Highest point
- Elevation: 10,551 ft (3,216 m)
- Coordinates: 44°24′49″N 110°08′53″W

Geography
- Location within Wyoming
- Location: Yellowstone National Park, Park County, Wyoming
- Parent range: Absaroka Range
- Topo map: Sylvan Lake

First Peoples Mountain (formerly Mount Doane) el. 10,551 feet (3,216 m) is a mountain peak in the Absaroka Range in Yellowstone National Park. The peak was formerly named for Lieutenant Gustavus Cheyney Doane, a U.S. Army cavalry officer who escorted the Washburn-Langford-Doane Expedition into Yellowstone in 1870. During that expedition, Doane and Nathaniel P. Langford ascended several peaks east of Yellowstone Lake. The name was changed to First Peoples Mountain in 2022.

== Washburn-Langford-Doane Expedition ==
Henry D. Washburn, the leader of the expedition named a peak for Doane, but that peak's name was later changed to Mount Schurz. Mount Doane was officially named by the Hayden Geological Survey of 1871 to honor the first truly official report of an exploration of the Yellowstone region that Doane wrote after the Washburn expedition. Doane also participated in the 1st Hayden expedition in 1871.

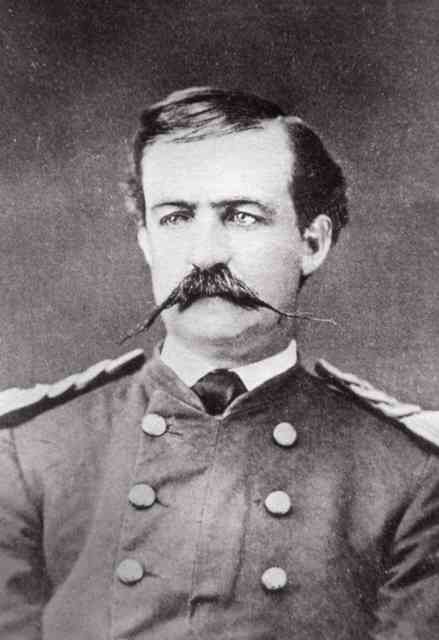
Mount Doane's namesake: Gustavus Cheyney Doane

Doane's account of his and Langford's ascent into the Absaroka Range (The Peak ascended is today's Colter Peak):

Seventeenth day -- September 7. -- In company with Mr. Langford, I climbed to the summit of a neighboring peak, the highest of the east range. We were four hours reaching the highest point, climbing for over a mile over shelly, feldspathic granite, after leaving our horses at the limit of pines.

Summit at noon, barometer, 20.35; thermometer, 65°; elevation, 10,327 feet.

The view from this peak commanded completely the lake, enabling us to sketch a map of its inlets and bearings with considerable accuracy. On the southwestern portion of the lake rose a high mountain of a yellow rock, forming a divide or water-shed in the center of the great basin, beyond which the waters flowed south and west. The stream we failed in crossing on the previous day rises in the southeast range, running east several miles, and joining another stream from the southwest at Bridger's Lake, a sheet of water about two miles in diameter, at the foot of a rocky peak about twenty-five miles to the south, from whence the stream flows due north, in a straight valley, to the Yellowstone Lake. This valley has a uniform width of about three miles, is level and swampy through its whole extent, with numerous lakelets of considerable size scattered at intervals over its surface. South of Bridger's Lake, and beyond the Snake River divide, were seen two vast columns of vapor, thirty miles away, which rose at least 500 feet above the tops of the hills. These were twenty times as large as any we had previously seen, but lay a long distance out of our course, and were not visited. Looking east, one mountain succeeds another, with precipitous ravines, volcanic, rugged, and in many places impassable, as if all the fusible portions of the mountains had melted and run away, leaving a vast cinder behind. There were no ranges of peaks; it was a great level plain of summits, with the softer portions melted out, the elevations all coming up to the same level, and capped with horizontal beds of surface lava. This formation extended to the limit of vision. The deep and narrow valleys were grassed and timbered, had sparkling streams, and furnished basins for numbers of small lakes; in fact, there are lakes here everywhere, on the summits of the mountains and on their terraced slopes, in valleys and in ravines, of all sizes, shapes, and qualities of water.

— Gustavus C. Doane, 1871

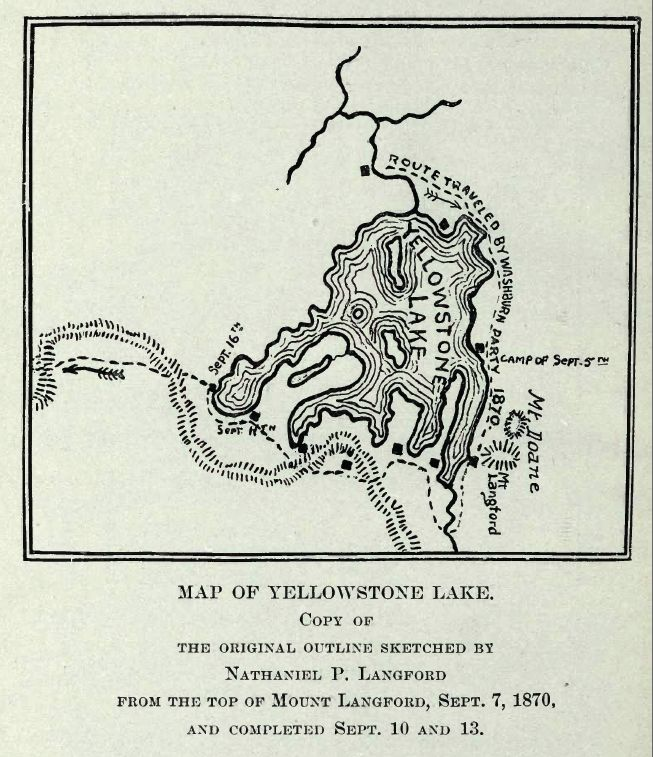
Original Map of Yellowstone Lake showing the first Mount Doane

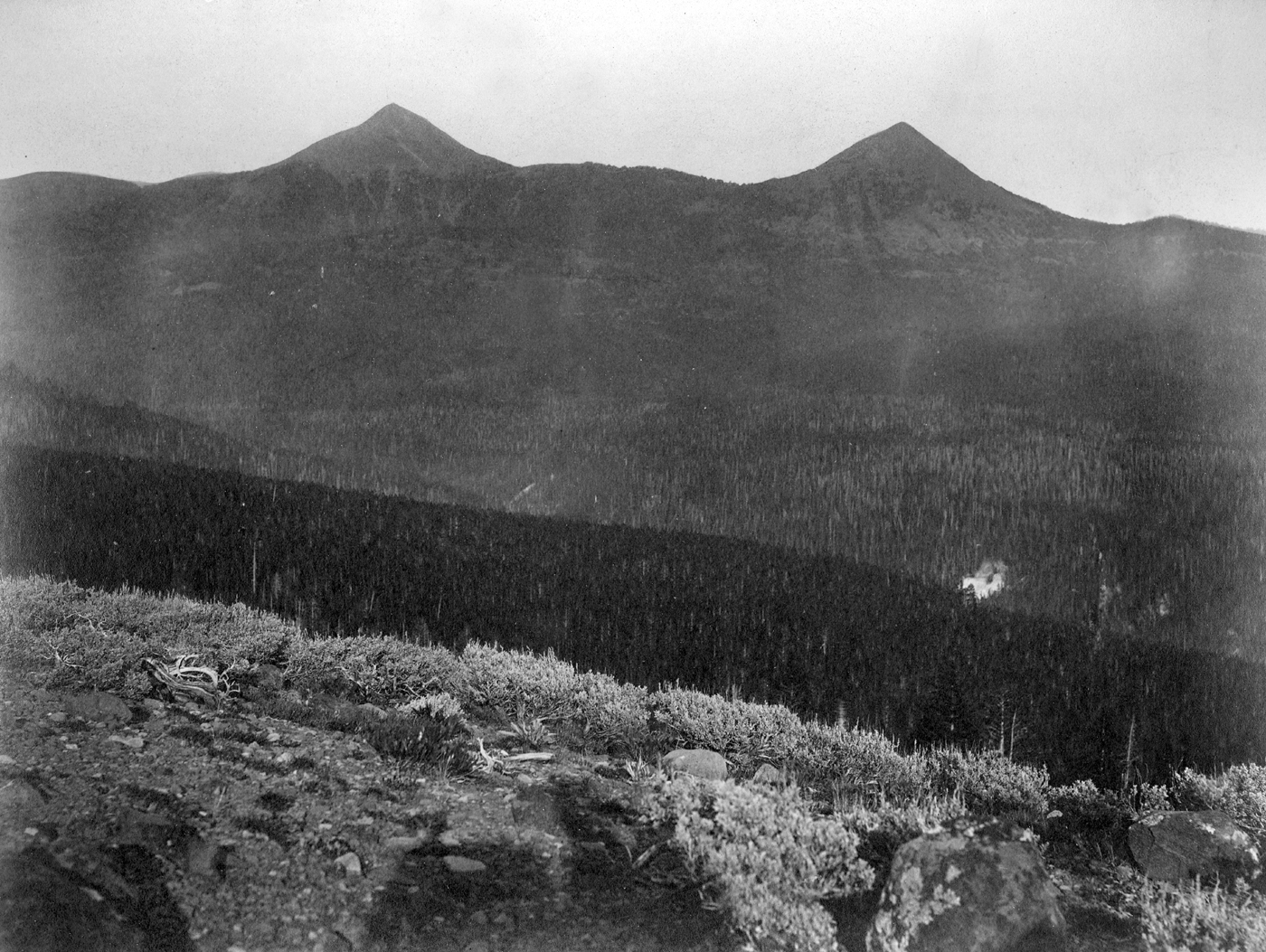
Mount Doane (left) and Mount Stevenson (right) 1871

== Renaming ==
Various groups of Native Americans had proposed renaming the mountain in 2017 and 2018, to First Peoples Mountain. The Great Plains Tribal Chairman's Association stated that Gustavius Doane should not be honored because of his role in murdering 200 Native American people, predominantly women and children who were sick with smallpox, in the Marias Massacre.

Based on suggestions by the Rocky Mountain Tribal Council, the Wyoming Board of Geographic names, and the National Park Service, the name "First Peoples Mountain" was forwarded to the Board of Geographic Names. In June 2022 the new name was affirmed by a vote of 15–0.

== See also ==
- Mountains and mountain ranges of Yellowstone National Park
