= Jean Baker =

Jean Baker may refer to:

- Jean Baker Miller (1927–2006), American psychiatrist, psychoanalyst, social activist, feminist, and author
- Jean-Claude Baker (1943–2015), French-American restaurateur
- Jean Baker (bowls) (born 1958), English international lawn bowler
- Jean H. Baker (born 1933), American historian
- Jean-Luc Baker (born 1993), American ice dancer

== Fictional characters ==
- Jean DeLynn Baker, character from The 4400

== See also ==
- Gene Baker (1925–1999), American baseball player
- John Baker
- Eugene Baker (disambiguation)
