= Fort Ellis =

Coordinates: 45°39′16″N 110°58′35″W

- Gallatin County, east of Bozeman, Montana
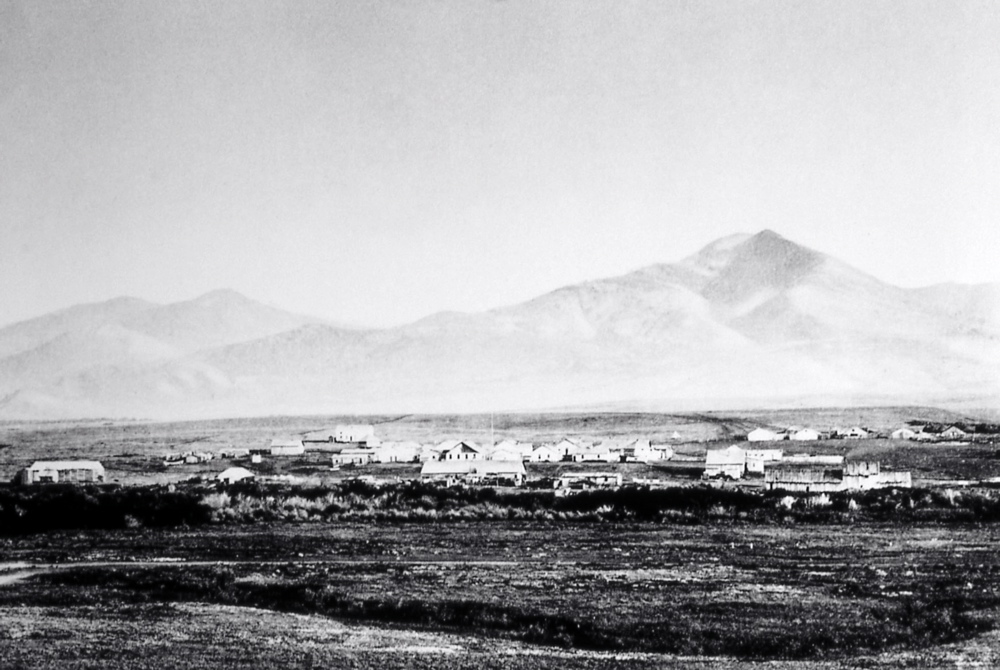
- Fort Ellis, July 1871

Site information
- Type: Fort
- Condition: No Remnants

Site history
- Built: August 27, 1867
- Built by: U.S. Army
- Materials: Logs
- Demolished: August 2, 1886 (decommissioned)
- Events: Marias Massacre; Washburn-Langford-Doane Expedition; Great Sioux War of 1876-77

Garrison information
- Garrison: U.S. Army 2nd Cavalry, 7th Infantry

Fort Ellis was a United States Army fort established August 27, 1867, east of present-day Bozeman, Montana. Troops from the fort participated in many major campaigns of the Indian Wars. The fort was closed on August 2, 1886.

== History ==
The fort was established by the War Department to protect and support settlers moving into the Gallatin Valley of Montana. The post was named for Colonel Augustus van Horne Ellis, an American soldier killed in 1863 at the Battle of Gettysburg during the Civil War. Five troops of the 2nd US Cavalry Regiment and infantry companies from the 7th Infantry Regiment provided the fort's garrison. Nearby Fort Elizabeth Meagher, which was established in the spring of 1867 on Rocky Creek, was abandoned after Fort Ellis was built.

Fort Ellis was an important post during the prominent Indian Wars of the 19th century as well as a base of operations for exploring the region now known as Yellowstone National Park. In January 1870, Major Eugene M. Baker led elements of the Second Cavalry against elements of the Piegan tribe, culminating in the Marias Massacre on the Marias River in Montana. In April 1876, Colonel John Gibbon departed Fort Ellis with 400 infantry and cavalry known as the "Montana Column" during the summer campaign of the Great Sioux War of 1876–77. Troops from Fort Ellis also participated in the Nez Perce War in 1877.

The fort provided military escorts for a number of prominent expeditions into the Yellowstone region. In 1870, Lieutenant Gustavus C. Doane and five cavalrymen escorted Henry Washburn and eight other civilians from Helena, Montana on the Washburn-Langford-Doane Expedition. Doane would also accompany expeditions in 1871 and 1875, as well as an ill-fated exploration of the Snake River in 1876.

Like many frontier garrisons, the fort's troops had an ambivalent relationship with the nearby town of Bozeman, located 3 miles to the west of the fort. On December 11, 1867 and December 14, 1867, soldiers of the 13th US Infantry destroyed buildings in and around the town that were found to be selling alcohol to the soldiers. Throughout the post's history, the settlers of Bozeman utilized the federal money brought to the city by contracts and payroll, but records demonstrate criminal behavior, and intense competition for these jobs.

Commanding Officers of Fort Ellis in Chronological Order
Name	Years of Service
Captain R. S. LaMotte	1867 – 1869
Colonel A. G. Brackett	1869 – 1870
Major Eugene M. Baker	1870 – 1873
Major N. B. Sweitzer	1873 – 1876
Captain D. W. Benham	1876 – 1877
Major J. S. Brisbin	1877 – 1880
Lieutenant Colonel A. J. Alexander	1880 – 1881
Major D. S. Gordon	1881 – 1884
Major G. G. Hunt	1884 – 1886

== Geological Survey Activity ==
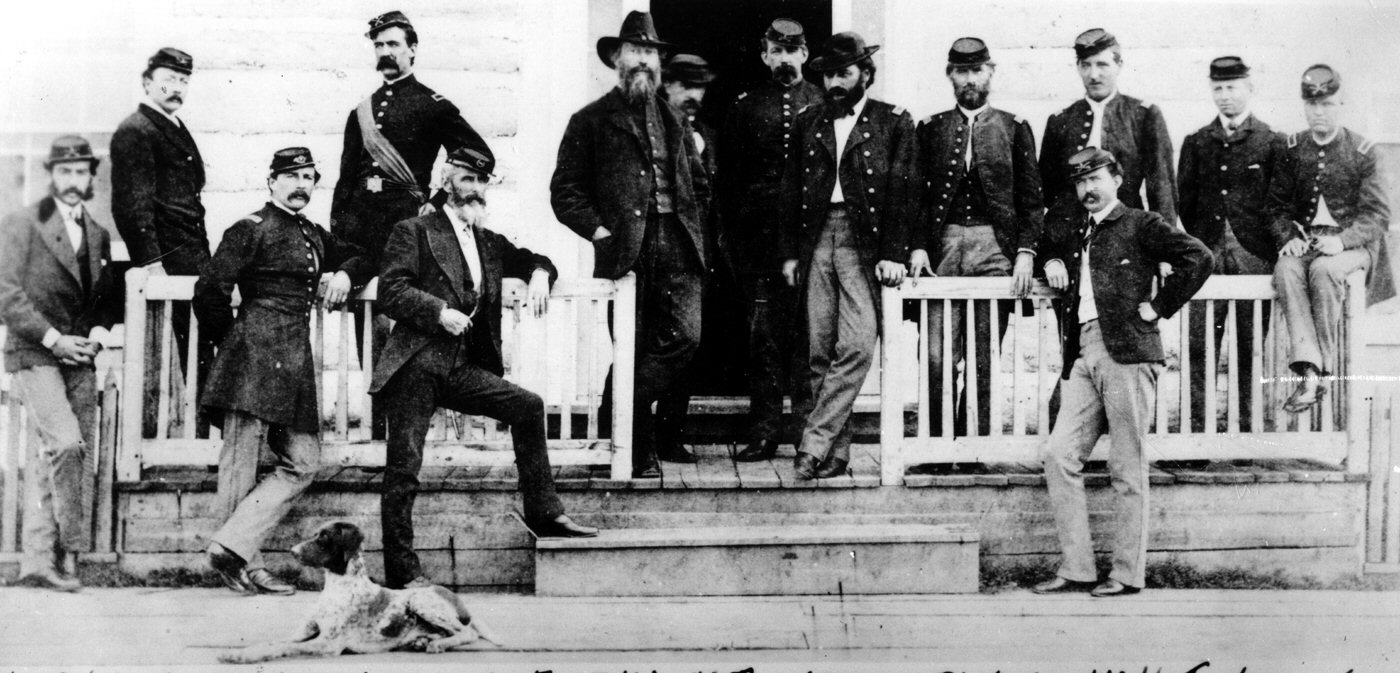
Lt. Colonel Eugene M. Baker and group of army officers at Fort Ellis, Montana Territory 1871. "Left to right: Frank C. Grugan, 1st Lt. 2nd Cavalry; Lewis Thompson, Capt. 2nd Cavalry; George H. Wright, 2nd Lt., 7th Infantry; Gustavus C. Doane, 2nd Lt. 2nd Cavalry; Lewis Cass Forsyth, Capt., acting Quartermaster, A.B. Campbell, Asst. Surgeon; Dr.R.M. Whitewood Contract Physician; Sam T. Hamilton, 1st Lt. 2nd Cavalry; Col. Eugene M. Baker in command of post Dec. 1, 1869 - Oct. 15, 1872; Edward Ball, Capt. 2nd Cavalry; Lovell H. Jerome, 2nd Lt. 2nd Cavalry (rear); George L. Tyler, Capt. 2nd Cavalry; Edward J. McClerand, 2nd Lt. 2nd Cavalry; Charles B. Schofield, 2nd Lt., 2nd Cavalry.

W.H. Jackson, the veteran photographer, wrote in 1928 about one of these surveys, "We, the Geological Survey, were at Fort Ellis again from September 1st to 5th on our return. On the first one of these occasions, I made several scenic views about the neighborhood at the suggestion of and in company with some of the officers, this one among them." Although the photograph bears the imprint of the Department of the Interior, U.S. Geological Survey of the Territories, Washington, D.C., no. 197, the negative has been lost or destroyed, no record of it being now obtainable at the Geological Survey; and this old print now has special historical interest.

== Decommissioning ==
Since Fort Ellis was located on prime agricultural land, many settlers in Bozeman petitioned to have the post closed after the arrival of the Northern Pacific Railroad in 1883. The civilians wanted to open the 26,000-acre military reservation to private settlement. Documents indicate that the post would likely have remained active for several more years. However, Generals Sherman and Sheridan struggled to find posts to close for fiscal reasons in the face of strong political pressure. As a result, they seized the chance, with local support, to close this post. Fort Ellis was decommissioned on August 2, 1886 (S.O. No. 73, Headquarters Department of Dakota, Fort Snelling, Minnesota) and was abandoned by the Army by the end of August 1886.

After decommissioning, the parade ground was used for sometime by the Montana Militia, and many of the buildings were eventually salvaged by Bozeman citizens. In August 1924, many of the fort's buildings were still intact, including a two-story house that was the Commanding Officer's quarters. The land is now deeded to Montana State University, and this building has been renovated and occupied by Montana State University's Agricultural Experimental Station. Collections on Fort Ellis are held and maintained by Montana State University Archive and Special Collections.

== See also ==
- List of military installations in Montana
