= Piegan Blackfeet =

Native American tribe

ᑯᖿᖹ / Piikáni / ṗiik̇ǔni

Total population
- 2010 census: total of 105,304 (alone and in combination)

Regions with significant populations
- United States (Montana)

Languages
- English, Blackfoot

Religion
- Christianity, Traditional beliefs

Related ethnic groups
- other Blackfeet peoples (Kainai and Siksika Nations), and Algonquian peoples

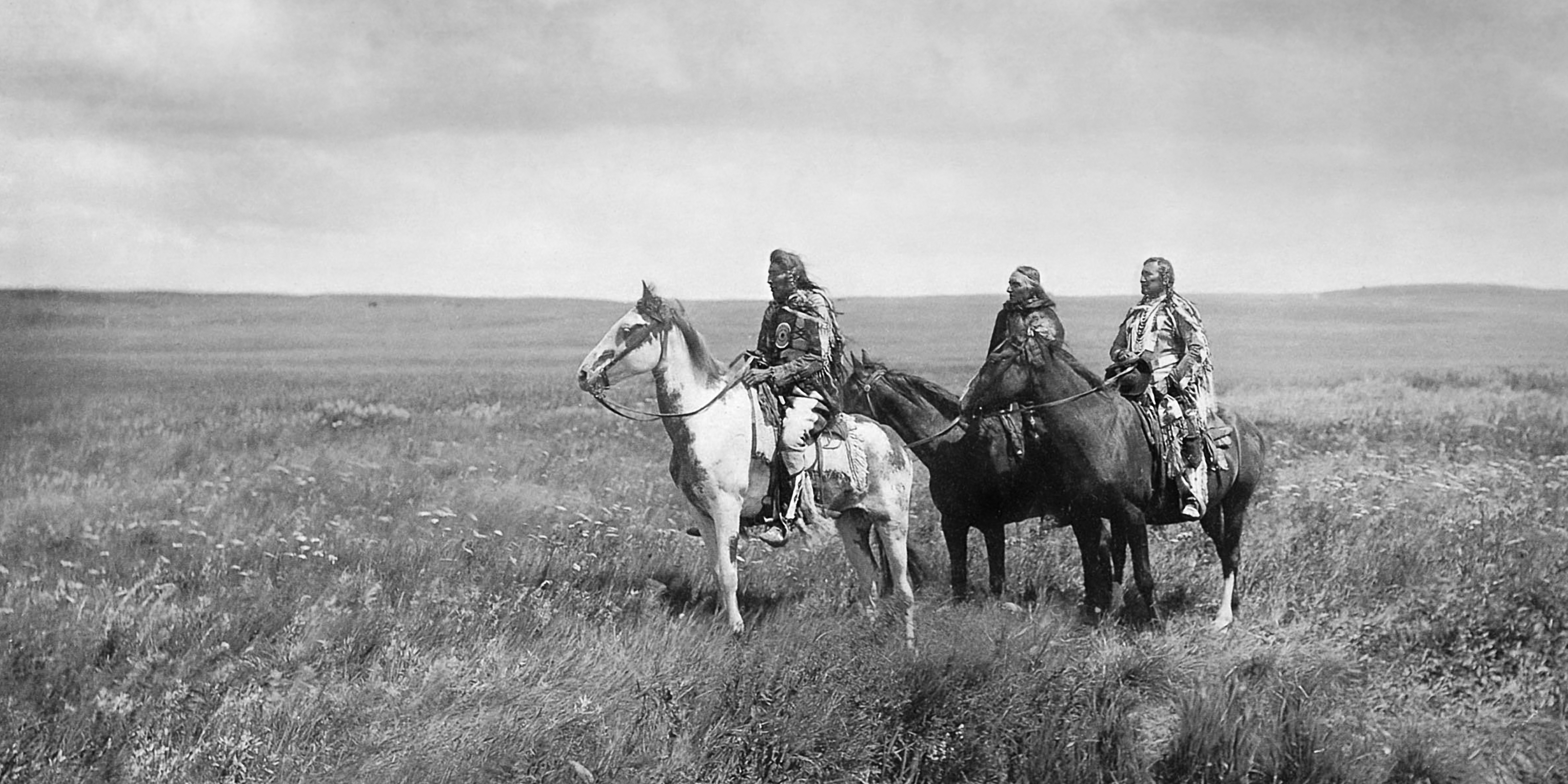
The three chiefs Piegan, by Edward S. Curtis

The Piegan (Blackfeet: ᑯᖿᖹ / Piikáni / ṗiik̇ǔni, Blackfoot pronunciation: [piːkʌ́ni]) are an Algonquian-speaking people from the North American Great Plains. They are the largest of three Blackfeet-speaking groups that make up the Blackfeet Confederacy; the Siksika and Kainai are the others. The Piegan dominated much of the northern Great Plains during the nineteenth century.

After their homelands were divided by the nations of Canada and the United States of America making boundaries between them, the Piegan people were forced to sign treaties with one of those two countries, settle in reservations on one side or the other of the border, and be enrolled in one of two government-like bodies sanctioned by North American nation-states. These two successor groups are the Blackfeet Nation, a federally recognized tribe in northwestern Montana, U.S., and the Piikani Nation, a recognized band government in Alberta, Canada.

Today many Piegan live with the Blackfeet Nation with tribal headquarters in Browning, Montana. There were 32,234 Blackfeet recorded in the 1990 United States census. In 2010 the US Census reported 105,304 persons who identified as Blackfeet ("alone" or "in combination" with one or more races and/or tribes.)

== Terminology ==
The Piegan (also known as the Pikuni, Piikuni, Piikani, and Piikáni) are one of the three original tribes of the Blackfeet Confederacy (a "tribe" here refers to an ethnic or cultural group with a shared name and identity). The Piegan are closely related to the Kainai Nation (also known as the "Blood Tribe"), and the Siksika Nation (also called the "Blackfeet Nation"); together they are sometimes collectively referred to as "the Blackfoot" or "the Blackfoot Confederacy". Ethnographic literature most commonly uses "Blackfeet people", and Canadian Blackfeet people use the singular Blackfeet.

The tribal governments and the US government use the term "Blackfeet", as in Blackfeet Nation, as used on their official tribe website. The term ᓱᖽᐧᖿ Siksiká, derived from ᓱᖽᐧᖼᖾᖳᐡ Siksikáíkoan (a Blackfeet person), may also be used as self-identification. In English, an individual may say, "I am Blackfeet" or "I am a member of the Blackfeet tribe."

Traditionally, Plains peoples were divided into "bands": groups of families who migrated together for hunting and defence. The bands of the Piegan, as given by Grinnell, are: Ahahpitape, Ahkaiyikokakiniks, Kiyis, Sikutsipmaiks, Sikopoksimaiks, Tsiniksistsoyiks, Kutaiimiks, Ipoksimaiks, Silkokitsimiks, Nitawyiks, Apikaiviks, Miahwahpitsiks, Nitakoskitsipupiks, Nitikskiks, Inuksiks, Miawkinaiyiks, Esksinaitupiks, Inuksikahkopwaiks, Kahmitaiks, Kutaisotsiman, Nitotsiksisstaniks, Motwainaiks, Mokumiks, and Motahtosiks. Hayden gives also Susksoyiks.

== Relations and history ==
=== Before 1870s ===
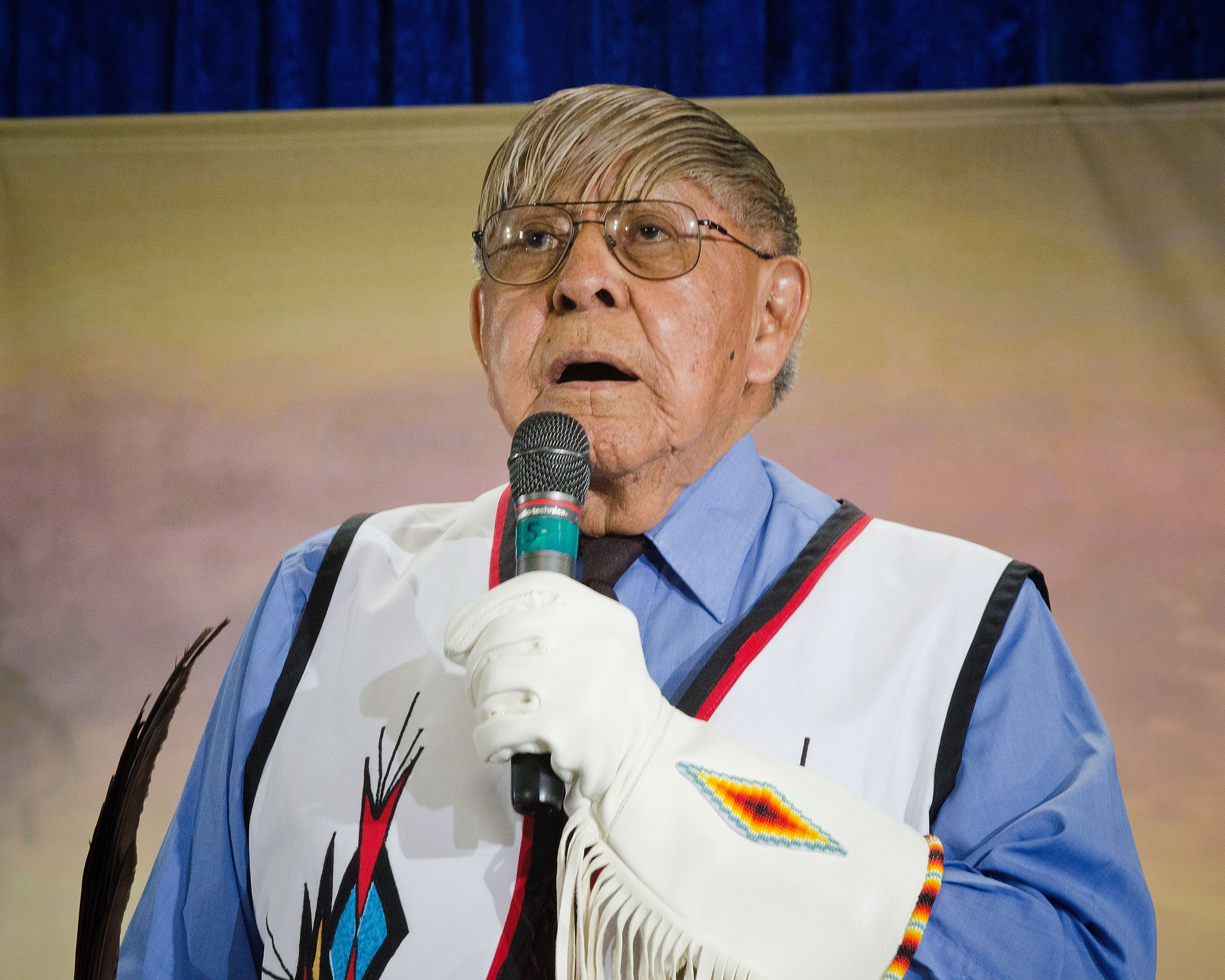
Chief Earl Old Person, chief of the Blackfeet Tribe in Montana

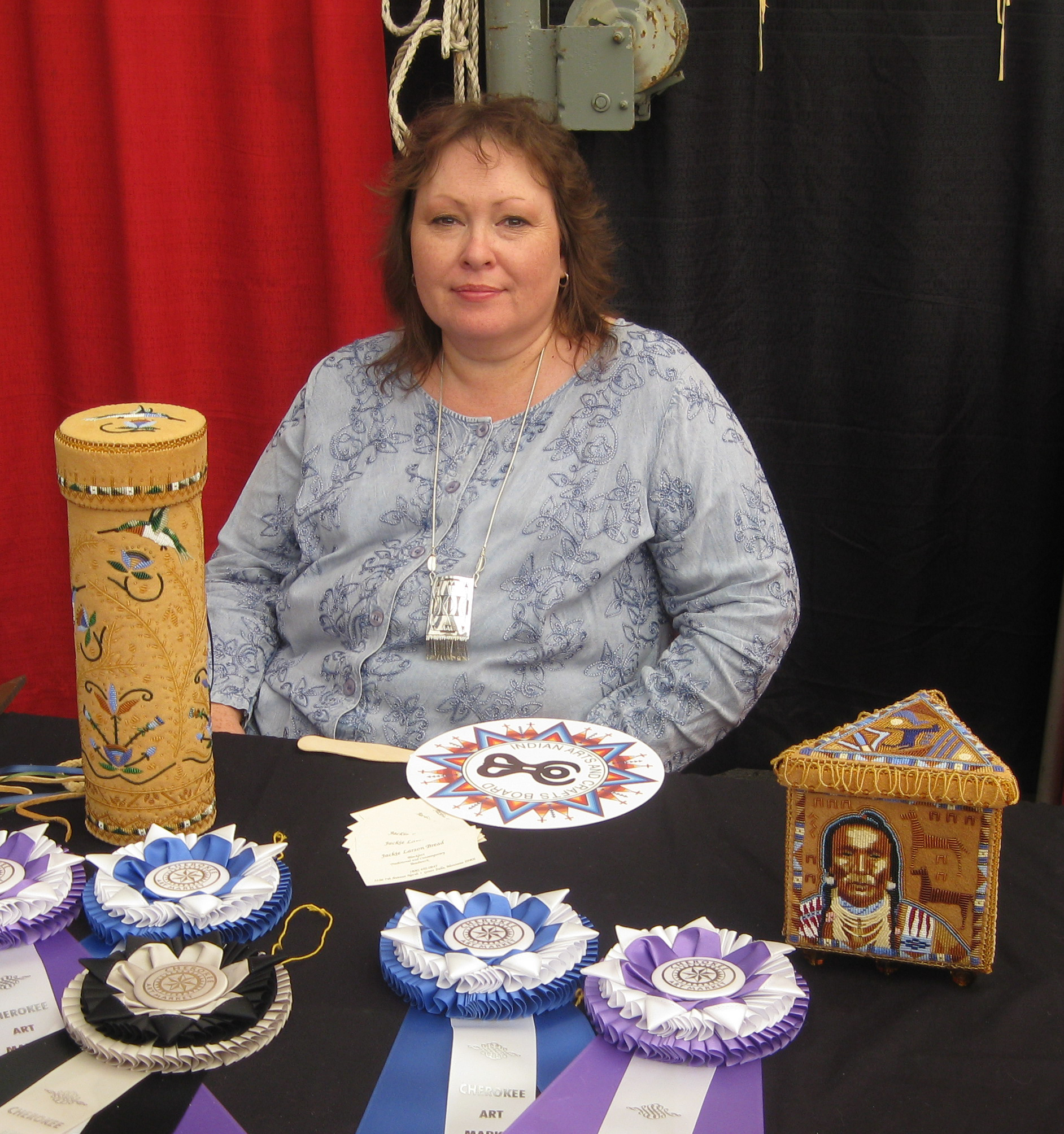
Jackie Larson Bread (enrolled Blackfeet Tribe of Montana) with her award-winning beadwork

In 2014, researchers reported on their sequencing of the DNA of a 12,500+-year-old infant skeleton in west-central Montana, found in close association with several Clovis culture artifacts. It showed strong affinities with all existing Native American populations.

There is preliminary evidence of human habitation in north central Montana that may date as far back as 5000 years. There was evidence that the people had made substantial use of buffalo jumps from as early as AD 300.

The Piegan people may be more recent arrivals in the area, as there is strong evidence that, beginning about 1730, their Algonquian-speaking ancestors migrated southwest from what today is Saskatchewan. Before that, they may have lived further east, as many Algonquian-speaking peoples have historically lived along the Atlantic Coast, and others around the Great Lakes.

Linguistic studies of the Blackfoot language in comparison to others in the Algonquian-language family indicate that the Blackfoot had long lived in an area west of the Great Lakes. Like others in this language family, the Blackfoot language is agglutinative.

The people practiced some agriculture and were partly nomadic. They moved westward after they adopted use of horses and guns, which gave them a larger range for bison hunting. They became part of the Plains Indians cultures in the early 19th century. According to tribal oral histories, humans lived near the Rocky Mountain Front for thousands of years before European contact. The Blackfoot creation story is set near Glacier National Park in an area now known as the Badger-Two Medicine.

The introduction of the horse is placed at about 1730, when raids by the Shoshone prompted the Piegan to obtain horses from the Kutenai and other Interior Salish peoples, as well as the Nez Perce. Early accounts of contact with European-descended people date to the late eighteenth century. The fur trader James Gaddy and the Hudson's Bay Company explorer David Thompson, the first Whites recorded as seeing Bow River, camped with a group of Piegan during the 1787–1788 winter.

In 1858 the Piegan in the United States were estimated to number 3,700. Three years later, Hayden estimated the population at 2,520. The population was at times dramatically lower when the Blackfeet people suffered declines due to infectious disease epidemics. They had no natural immunity to Eurasian diseases, and the 1837 smallpox epidemic on the Plains killed 6,000 Blackfeet, as well as thousands more in other tribes. The Blackfeet also suffered from starvation because of disruption of food supplies and war. When the last buffalo hunt failed in 1882, that year became known as the starvation year. In 1900, there were an estimated 20,000 Blackfoot. In 1906 there were 2,072 under the Blackfeet Agency in Montana, and 493 under the Piegan band in Alberta, Canada. In the early 21st century, there are more than 35,000. In the US 2010 census, 105,304 people identified as Piegan Blackfeet, 27,279 of them full-blooded, the remainder self-identified as being of more than one race or, in some cases, with ancestry from more than one tribe, but they primarily identified as Blackfeet.

The Blackfeet had controlled large portions of Alberta and Montana. Today the Blackfeet Reservation in Montana is the size of Delaware, and the three Blackfoot reserves in Alberta have a much smaller area.

The Blackfeet hold belief "in a sacred force that permeates all things, represented symbolically by the sun whose light sustains all things".

The Blackfeet have "manly-hearted women". These were recorded as acting in many of the social roles of men. This includes a willingness to sing alone, usually considered "immodest", and using a men's singing style.

== Piegan ==
- Earl Old Person (1929–2021 ), former Chief of the Blackfeet Tribe; added to the Montana Indian Hall of Fame in 2007
- Helen Piotopowaka Clarke (1846–1923), actress, educator, and bureaucrat; was one of the first women elected to public office in Montana
- James Welch (1940–2003), author and poet. While most of his published works were novels, he also wrote the non-fiction historical account, Killing Custer: The Battle of Little Bighorn and the Fate of the Plains Indians. He was one of the participants in the PBS American Experience documentary, Last Stand at Little Bighorn. His award-winning novel Fools Crow is based on the Blackfeet tribe and its culture.
- John Two Guns White Calf (1872–1934) was a chief who became famous while promoting the Glacier National Park for the Great Northern Railway.
- Stephen Graham Jones (1972- ), author, won a National Endowment for the Arts Fellowship and the Independent Publisher Book Award for Multicultural Fiction, and other awards. At public readings he has said that his short story "Bestiary" is not fiction.
- Lily Gladstone (1986 - ), actress, is the first Native American to win the Golden Globe award for Best Actress in a Motion Picture - Drama for her portrayal of Mollie Kyle in the film adaptation of the book Killers of the Flower Moon by David Grann. She is of Piegan Blackfeet and Nez Perce heritage, but grew up on the Blackfeet Reservation in Browning, Montana.

=== Books about the Blackfeet ===
- George Bird Grinnell (1849–1938), European-American author and ethnologist; wrote accounts of the Blackfeet Nation during his travels and research as a conservationist; editor of Forest and Stream
- James Willard Schultz, or Apikuni (1859–1947), author, explorer, Glacier National Park guide, fur trader and historian of the Blackfeet Indians. He wrote and published 37 fiction and non-fiction books dealing with the Blackfeet, Kootenai, and Flathead Indians. His works received critical literary acclaim.
- The Buffalo Hunter Hunter, by Stephen Graham Jones, centers around a Piegan Blackfeet man who becomes a vampire and seeks revenge for the crimes of the United States government against his people and their land.

== See also ==
- Marias massacre

== Bibliography ==
- Dempsey, Hugh A. and Lindsay Moir. Bibliography of the Blackfoot, (Native American Bibliography Series, No. 13) Metuchen, NJ: The Scarecrow Press, 1989, ISBN 0-8108-2211-3
- Ewers, John C. The Blackfeet: Raiders on the Northwestern Plains, Norman: University of Oklahoma Press, 1958 (and later reprints). ISBN 0-8061-0405-8
- Johnson, Bryan R. The Blackfeet: An Annotated Bibliography, New York: Garland Publishing, 1988. ISBN 0-8240-0941-X
