= Mount Jackson (Wyoming) =

Mountain in Wyoming, United States of America

- Location within Wyoming

Highest point
- Elevation: 8,231 ft (2,509 m)
- Coordinates: 44°39′09″N 110°50′11″W

Geography
- Location: Yellowstone National Park, Teton County, Wyoming
- Parent range: Gallatin Range
- Topo map: Mount Jackson

Mount Jackson el. 8,231 feet (2,509 m) is a mountain peak just north of the Madison River, in the Gallatin Range of Yellowstone National Park. Mount Jackson is named in honor of William Henry Jackson, chief photographer of the Hayden Geological Survey of 1871 and a member of several subsequent geological surveys in the park. Jackson's photographs are some of the earliest ever taken in Yellowstone. The name was suggested by a park naturalist in 1935 but not awarded until 1937 when Jackson, who was still living gave his approval. Jackson visited the park regularly until his death in 1942.

Images of Mount Jackson
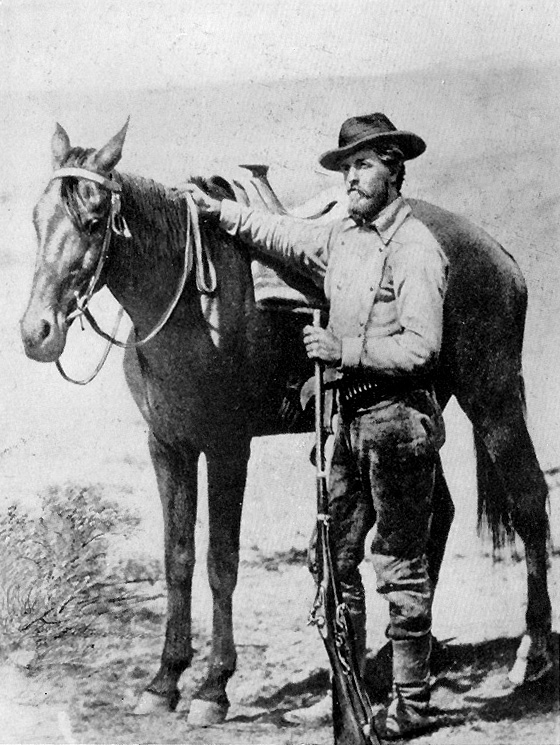
Mount Jackson's namesake, William Henry Jackson, 1872

== See also ==
Mountains and mountain ranges of Yellowstone National Park
