= Mount Stevenson =

Mountain in the American state of Wyoming

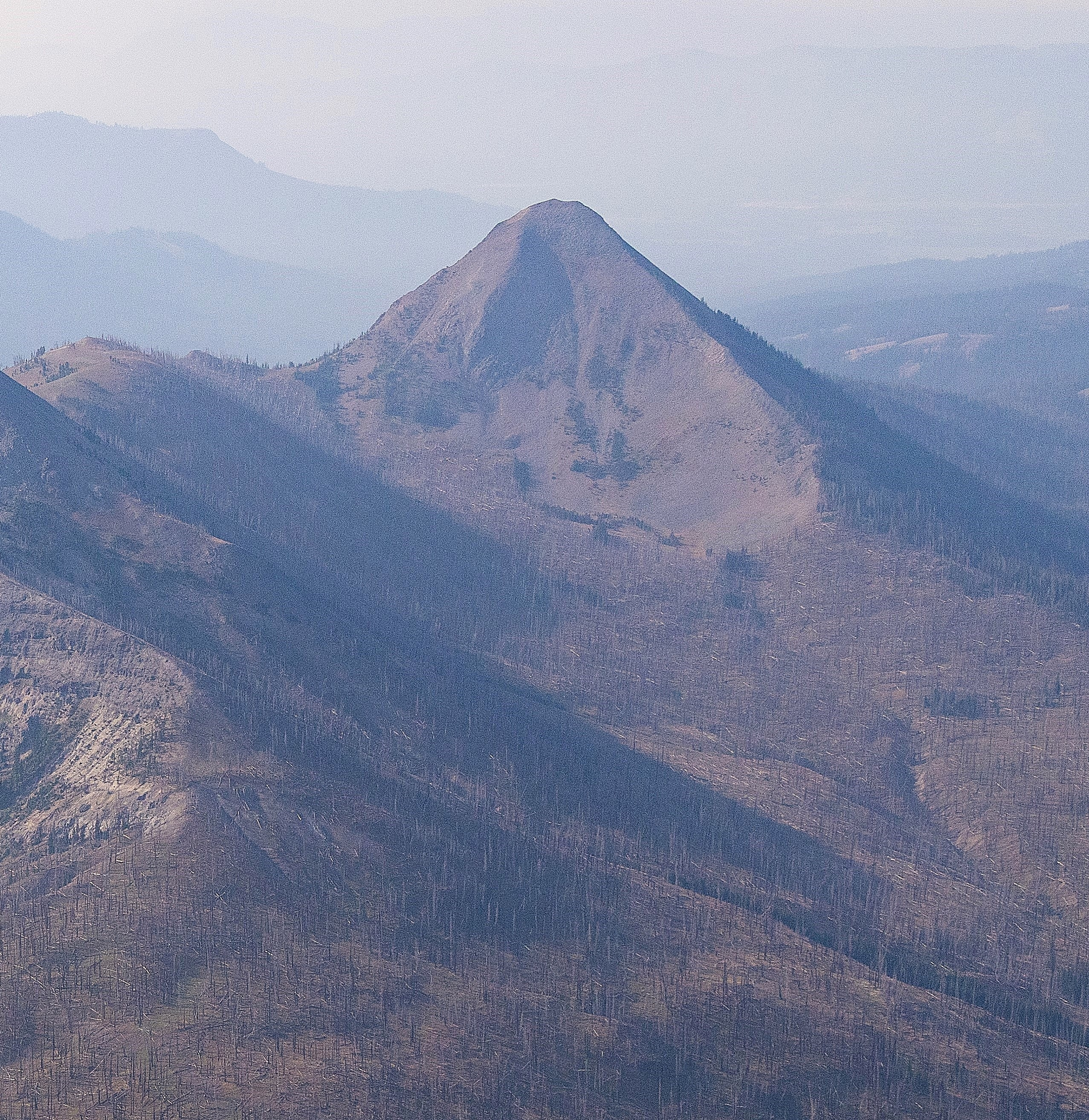
- North aspect

Highest point
- Elevation: 10,230 ft (3,120 m)
- Coordinates: 44°24′06″N 110°09′34″W

Geography
- Location within Wyoming
- Location: Yellowstone National Park, Park County, Wyoming, US
- Parent range: Absaroka Range
- Topo map: Sylvan Lake

Mount Stevenson el. 10,230 feet (3,120 m) is a mountain peak in the Absaroka Range of Yellowstone National Park. Mount Stevenson was named in 1871 by geologist Ferdinand Hayden during the Hayden Geological Survey of 1871 for his friend and chief assistant, James Stevenson (1840–1888). Stevenson, who had run away from home as a young boy, first met Hayden in 1853 during an exploration of the Dakota Badlands. In 1866, Stevenson began working for Hayden and did so until 1879. Hayden specifically cited Stevenson's loyalty to him in his 1872 report on the 1871 survey of the park. Stevenson Island on Yellowstone Lake is also named for James Stevenson.

My principal assistant, Mr. James Stevenson, labored with his usual efficiency and fidelity throughout the entire trip. In honor of his great services not only during the past season, but for over twelve years of unremitting toil as my assistant, oftentimes without pecuniary reward, and with little of the scientific recognition that uaually comes to the original explorer, I have desired that one of the principal islands of the lake and one of the noble peaks reflected in its clear waters should bear his name forever.

— F. V. Hayden, 1872

== See also ==
- Mountains and mountain ranges of Yellowstone National Park
