= Hayden Geological Survey of 1871 =

Geological survey

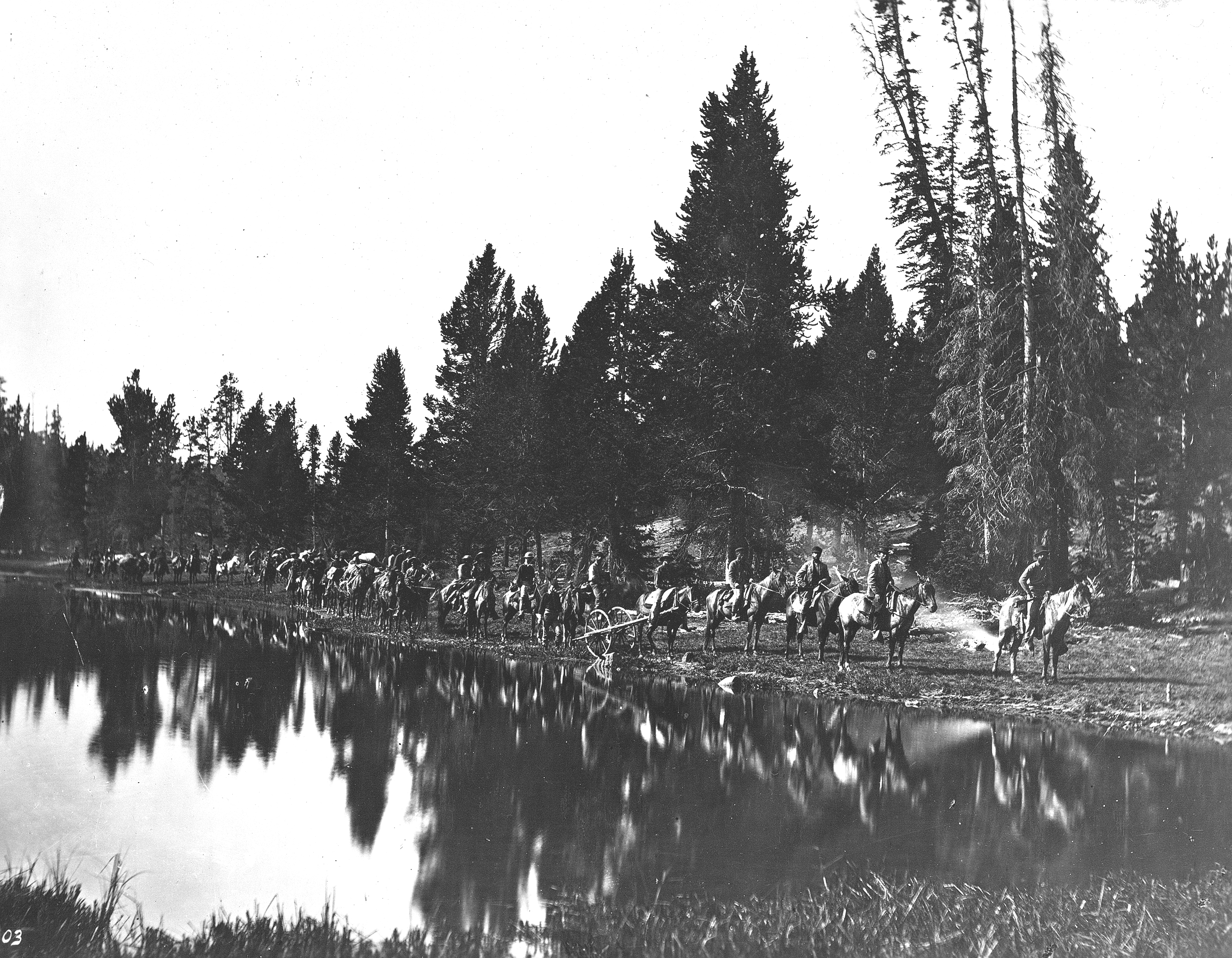
1871 Hayden Survey at Mirror Lake en route to East Fork of the Yellowstone River, August 24, 1871-W.H. Jackson photo

The Hayden Geological Survey of 1871 explored the region of northwestern Wyoming that later became Yellowstone National Park in 1872. It was led by geologist Ferdinand Vandeveer Hayden. The 1871 geological survey was not Hayden's first, but it was the first federally funded geological survey to explore and further document features in the region soon to become Yellowstone National Park, and played a prominent role in convincing the U.S. Congress to pass the legislation creating the park. In 1894, Nathaniel P. Langford, the first park superintendent and a member of the Washburn-Langford-Doane Expedition which explored the park in 1870, wrote this about the Hayden expedition:

We trace the creation of the park from the Folsom-Cook expedition of 1869 to the Washburn expedition of 1870, and thence to the Hayden expedition (U. S. Geological Survey) of 1871, Not to one of these expeditions more than to another do we owe the legislation which set apart this "pleasuring-ground for the benefit and enjoyment of the people"

— Nathaniel P. Langford

== Origins ==
The 1871 Hayden survey had its roots in the Pacific Railroad Survey bill passed by Congress in 1853 to find the best routes for railroads from the Mississippi to the Pacific coast. The bill spawned an era of federally funded Great Surveys undertaken by the Department of the Interior after the Civil War that brought together explorers, engineers, scientists and topographers in a common effort to chart the western U.S. Hayden along with John Wesley Powell, Clarence King and George Wheeler were the leaders of these great surveys.

In March 1871, a sum of $40,000 was appropriated by Congress to finance Hayden's fifth survey to explore mostly the territories of Idaho and Montana. Hayden was very familiar with Jay Cooke's desire to promote the Yellowstone region for the Northern Pacific Railroad and had attended Nathaniel P. Langford's January 1871 lecture in Washington, D.C., on the Washburn-Langford-Doane Expedition to Yellowstone of the previous year. The $40,000 that was granted for Hayden's expedition was not available until July 1, the beginning of the fiscal year; however, the determined Hayden was still able to organize and equip his expedition with the help of the US Army, Fort Bridger and the railroads. After the passage of the Sundry Civil bill, Hayden immediately applied to the Secretary of War for permission to draw on equipment, stores, and transportation at frontier army posts. This was authorized, together with a small escort "when deemed necessary and the public service will permit." Likewise, the Union Pacific and Central Pacific Railroads agreed to carry Hayden's men and equipment without cost.

Hayden had an experienced assistant, James Stevenson. In 1866, Stevenson accompanied Hayden into the badlands of Dakota Territory in a search for minerals and fossils, and from that time on he was Hayden's assistant in every venture until the Hayden Survey was merged with those of King and Powell to form the U.S. Geological Survey in 1879.

The two were now able to outfit and equip members of Hayden's survey at Fort D. A. Russell in Wyoming and transport the equipment, subsistence, wagons, and animals he would need by rail to Ogden, Utah, where a base camp had been set up in May on an old lake terrace a mile east of the city. During the weeks leading up to the expedition the scientists and other men were to make up the party that would venture into the Yellowstone region.

In the spring of 1871, Hayden selected the members of the survey team, 32 in all, from among friends and colleagues, seven previous survey participants, and a few political patrons. Included in the party was William Henry Jackson, his photographer from his 1870 survey and Thomas Moran, a guest artist arranged by Jay Cooke. Two of the members, the young mineralogist Albert Peale and the botanist George Allen, were respectively a student of Hayden's at the University of Pennsylvania and Hayden's Natural History professor at Oberlin College. Both Allen and Peale kept private journals of the expedition which when discovered in later years have brought great insight to the daily operations of the survey team.

== Survey route ==
The survey officially began on June 8, 1871, when it departed Ogden, Utah 41.227744°N 111.961193°W, although many survey members were already making observations and collecting specimens while the team was assembling in Salt Lake City and then Ogden. The party traveled north, reaching Taylor's Bridge 43.491775°N 112.032509°W (now Idaho Falls) on the Snake River on June 25, 1871. On June 30, 1871, the survey party had reached into Montana, camping just over the Continental Divide near Monida Pass 44.55861°N 112.30556°W. Hayden and his survey party reached Virginia City, Montana 45.294107°N 111.94123°W on July 4, 1871, and Fort Ellis near Bozeman, Montana, on July 10, 1871. By this time, Thomas Moran, the guest artist had joined the survey. At Fort Ellis, both George Allen, the botanist and Cyrus Thomas, the agricultural statistician and entomologist, then left the party for health reasons, while José, the guide, joined the team. After resupplying and coordinating with the U.S. Army at Fort Ellis, the survey departed south along the Yellowstone River on July 15, 1871. For the next 45 days, the Hayden Survey would coordinate efforts with the Barlow-Heap expedition under the command of Colonel John W. Barlow, Chief Engineer for General Philip Sheridan that the U.S. Army was sending into Yellowstone at the same time.

As the survey team traveled up the Yellowstone River in what is now called Paradise Valley, they confirmed what Hayden already knew, that the trail was unsuitable for their wagons. Near Bottler's Ranch 45°19′30″N 110°47′33″W, the last outpost in the valley near Emigrant Gulch, the survey team set up a base camp that would be used to assist in any communications or support needed while the team was in the Yellowstone region with Fort Ellis. Abandoning their wagons at the base camp, the survey headed into Yankee Jim Canyon 45°11′43″N 110°54′05″W late on July 20, 1871.

=== Yellowstone region ===
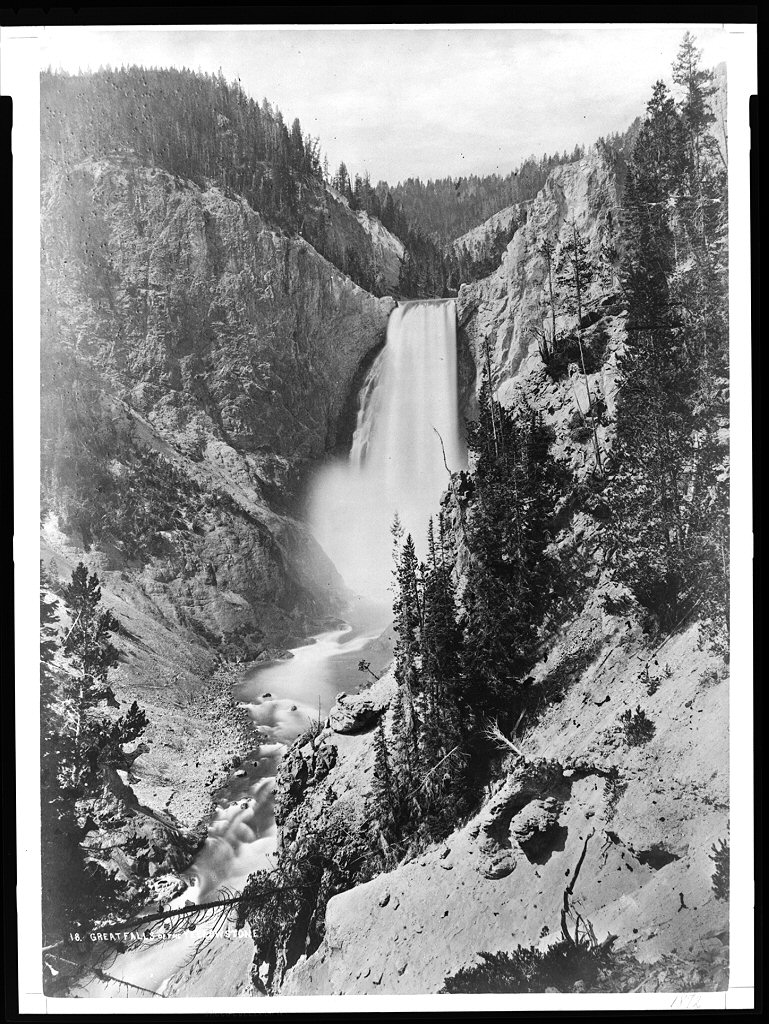
Jackson's 1871 photo of the Lower Falls of the Yellowstone

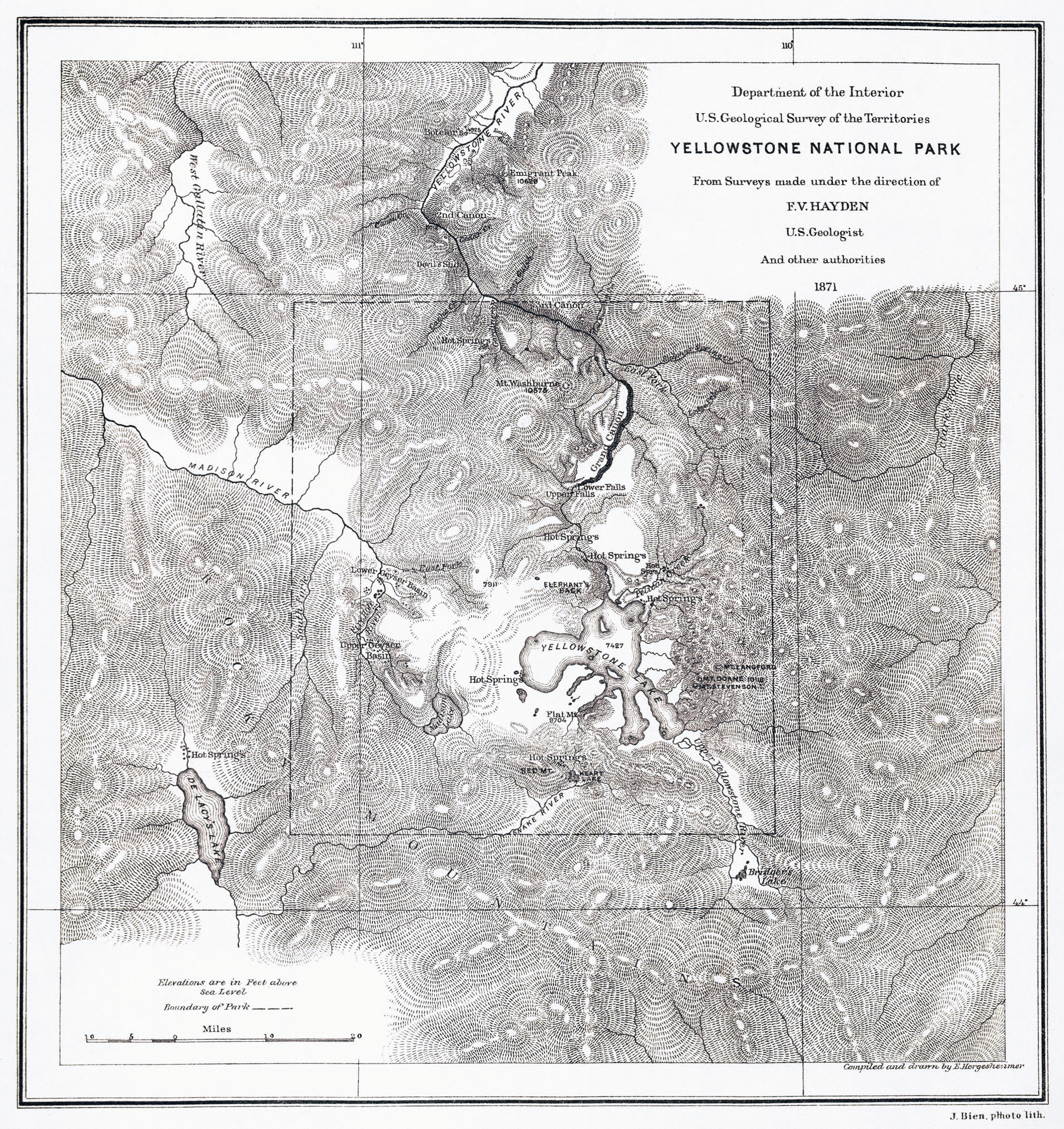
Map of Yellowstone from 1871 survey

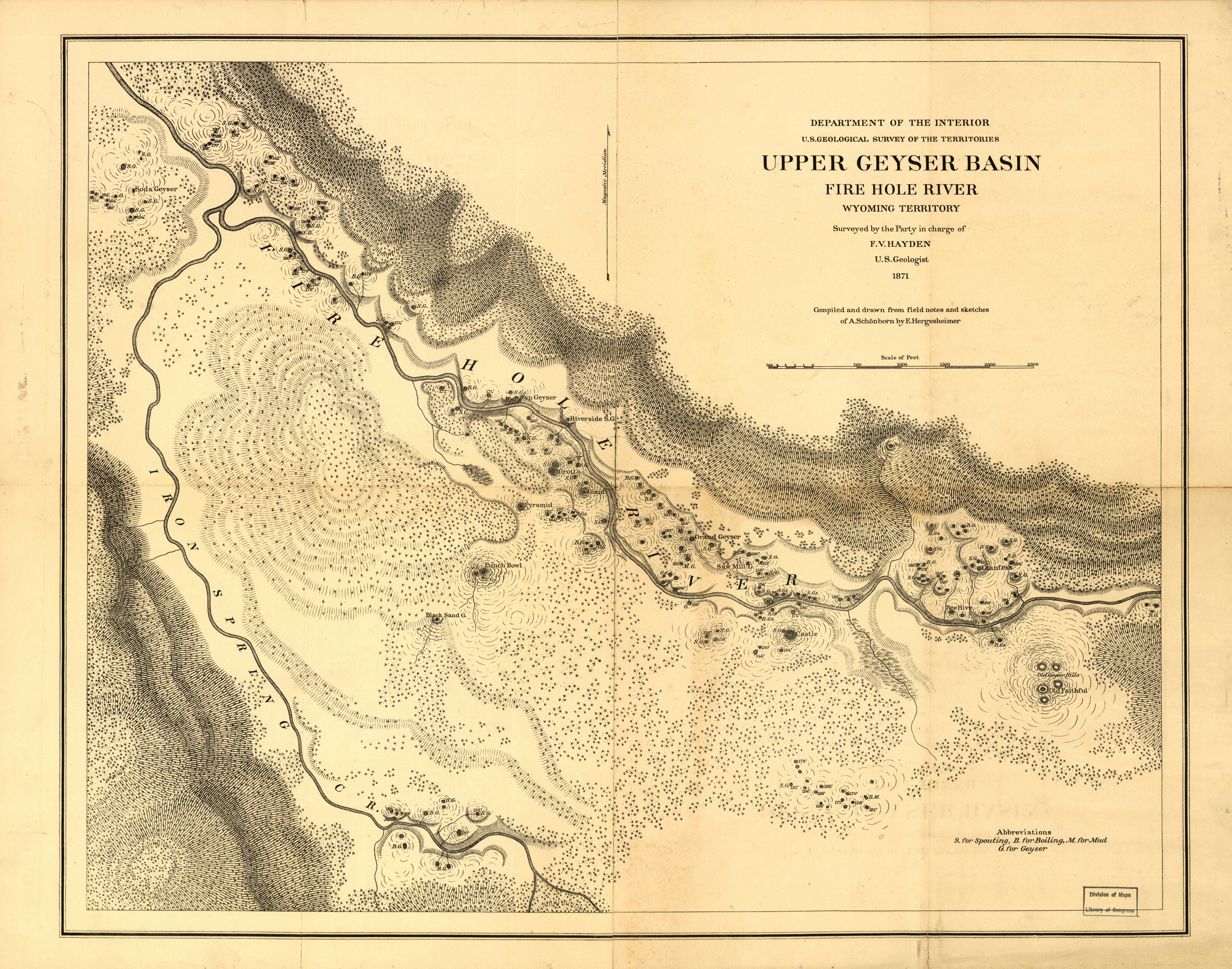
Map of Upper Geyser Basin, 1871

On July 21, 1871, the Hayden survey entered the park region at the Gardner River proceeding up that river to what is now called Mammoth Hot Springs where they explored and camped for two days. At Mammoth, they found that two men, named J.C. McCartney and H. R. Horr, had laid claim to 320 acres (1.3 km^{2}) and established a ranch and bath house on the Mammoth terraces near Liberty Cap. These entrepreneurs eventually established a primitive hotel at Mammoth and were not evicted from the area until many years after the park was established. On July 24, 1871, the survey team departed Mammoth en route to Tower Fall. They took a route very close to today's Mammoth-Tower road passing both Undine Falls 44°56′39″N 110°38′20″W on Lava Creek and Wraith Falls 44°56′14″N 110°37′25″W on Lupine Creek. They reached and camped at Tower Creek on July 25, 1871.

The survey team spent three days traveling around Mount Washburn and along the western edge of the Yellowstone River in Hayden Valley to reach its source at Yellowstone Lake on July 28, 1871. It was here that Lt. Gustavus C. Doane replaced Captain Tyler as commander of the military escort. En route they camped at Cascade Creek 44°43′00″N 110°29′58″W near Yellowstone Falls where W. H. Jackson took the first known photographs of the falls. On July 28, 1871, some members of the Hayden party assembled a small boat from components they packed in from Fort Ellis and carved oars from nearby trees. The boat, Annie, was the first known boat to sail on the waters of Yellowstone Lake. Annie was used by several members of the party to explore the islands and take soundings of the lake. The first trip was made by James Stevenson and Henry Elliot to an island about 1.5 miles (2.4 km) offshore. Hayden named the island Stevenson Island 44°30′55″N 110°23′07″W.

On July 31, 1871, Hayden and some members of his survey team left Yellowstone Lake (others stayed at the lake to tend the boat and supplies) and ventured back into the Hayden Valley where at the Crater Hills Geyser group they proceeded due west en route the geyser basins of the Madison River drainage. They eventually reached the headwaters of Nez Percé Creek 44°34′40″N 110°37′13″W, traveling down the creek until they camped about 6 miles (9.7 km) from the Firehole River. The party spent several days in the Lower, Midway and Upper Geyser basins finally departing on August 6, 1871.

The survey followed the Firehole River upstream to Madison Lake 44°20′55″N 110°51′58″W and then over the divide to Shoshone Lake eventually camping near Lost Lake about 6 miles (9.7 km) from the West Thumb area of Yellowstone Lake. On August 7, 1871, they camped and explored at West Thumb for two days. As some of the military escort were to travel back to Fort Ellis, the survey team took the opportunity to send back correspondence and a large amount of specimens collected to the Base Camp at Bottler's Ranch. In that correspondence was Hayden's Report No. 7 to Assistant Secretary of the Smithsonian Institution, Dr. Spencer Baird, a bit of which is excerpted below:

Yellowstone Lake, WY August 8th, 1871 – Dear Professor Baird, Your letters of June 6th and July 3rd were brought us from Fort Ellis by Lt. Doane who has just arrived to take command of our escort and accompany my party the remainder of the season. ... We arrived at the banks of the Yellow Stone Lake [sic] July 26th [actually July 28] and pitched our camp near the point where the river leaves the Lake. Hence we brought the first pair of wheels that ever came to the Lake with our Odometer. We launched the first Boat on the Lake, 4.5 feet wide and 11 feet long, with sails and oars. ... A chart of this soundings will be made. Points have been located with a prismatic compass all around the Lake. A man stands on the shore with a compass and takes a bearing to the man in the Boat as he drops the lead, giving a signal at the time. Then a man in the Boat takes a bearing to the fixed point on the shore where the first man is located and thus the soundings will be located on the chart. Henry Elliot and Mr. Carrington have just left in our little boat, the Annie. [They] will make a systematic sketch of the shore with all its indentations, with the banks down, indeed, making a complete topographical as well as pictorial sketch of the shores as seen from the water, for a circuit--of at least 130 miles. ... One of the islands has been explored. We have called it Stevenson's Island as he was undoubtedly the first human that ever set foot upon it. ... We found everything in the Geyser region even more wonderful than it has been represented. ... I send this back to you by James [Stevenson] who returns to our permanent camp for supplies. ... We hope to reach Fort Ellis about the 1st or 5th of September. Schönborn does splendid Topographical work. Write at once. Yours Truly, F. V. Hayden, I will send you some Photographs soon.

Between August 9 and August 19, 1871, the survey party traveled around the southern and eastern sides of Yellowstone Lake, crossing the Continental Divide twice and exploring the headwaters of the Yellowstone River. On August 19 they arrived at the northeast corner of the lake at Steamboat Point 44°31′54″N 110°17′34″W (named by Hayden for steam jets nearby) near Turbid Lake where they camped for a few days in preparation for their return to the Yellowstone River via the East Fork (Lamar River). While camped at Steamboat Point, the party experienced two sizable earthquakes, one that Peale described as:

This morning [August 20] about 1 o'clock we had quite an earthquake. The first schock [sic] lasted about 20 seconds and was followed by five or six shorter ones. Duncan, who was on guard, says that the trees were shaken and that the horses that were lying on the ground sprang to their feet ... We had three shocks during the morning.

On August 23, 1871, after dismantling and caching Annie, the party moved northeast away from Yellowstone Lake until they encountered Pelican Creek. They followed the creek northeast until they reached the divide at Mirror Lake 44°44′05″N 110°09′51″W where they camped. The next morning they continued northeast until encountering the headwaters of the East Fork of the Yellowstone River Lamar River. Following the river downstream they camped just short of Soda Butte Creek. In the morning, on August 25, 1871, they entered the upper Lamar Valley and traveled on good trails northwest through the valley all the way to the Yellowstone River at Baronette Bridge 44°55′45″N 110°24′03″W. In October 1870, John C. Baronett, a Helena prospector, helped rescue Truman C. Everts after he had become lost during the Washburn Expedition of 1870. After rescuing Everts, Baronett returned to Yellowstone and constructed a pack train bridge across the Yellowstone just above the mouth of the Lamar River. This was the first bridge across the Yellowstone. In 1878, during a later survey, Hayden named a nearby peak 44°58′31″N 110°05′19″W in honor of John Baronett. By the evening of August 26, 1871 most of the survey party had left the park region and was camped just north of Gardiner on the Yellowstone River. The next day, most would rendezvous at Bottler's Ranch. After reaching Bottler's, Dr. Hayden posted his report No. 8, August 28, 1871, to Spencer Baird (excerpted):

Dear Professor Baird, We have completed our survey of the Upper Yellow Stone [sic]. Our success has been complete. Our map is now complete of every stream emptying into the Lake or River above this point. Henry Elliot and young Carrington returned in seven days with a wonderful sketch of the Lake ... Henry Elliot has sketched all the Craters, the Geysers in motion, the Mud Springs, etc. We have a splendid lot of specimens also. We have about 400 negatives ... The Lake has been well photographed. ... Huse does not amount to much. I shall drop him at Chicago and that will end him so far as I am concerned. I intend to have a nice little fellow. Dr. Peale, of Philadelphia, spend the winter at Washington arranging our collections ... He is, I think, a young man of the right stamp. ... Henry Elliot is the biggest kind of Trump. He has done some great things on this trip. ... Yours Truly, F.V. Hayden

=== The return to Fort Bridger ===
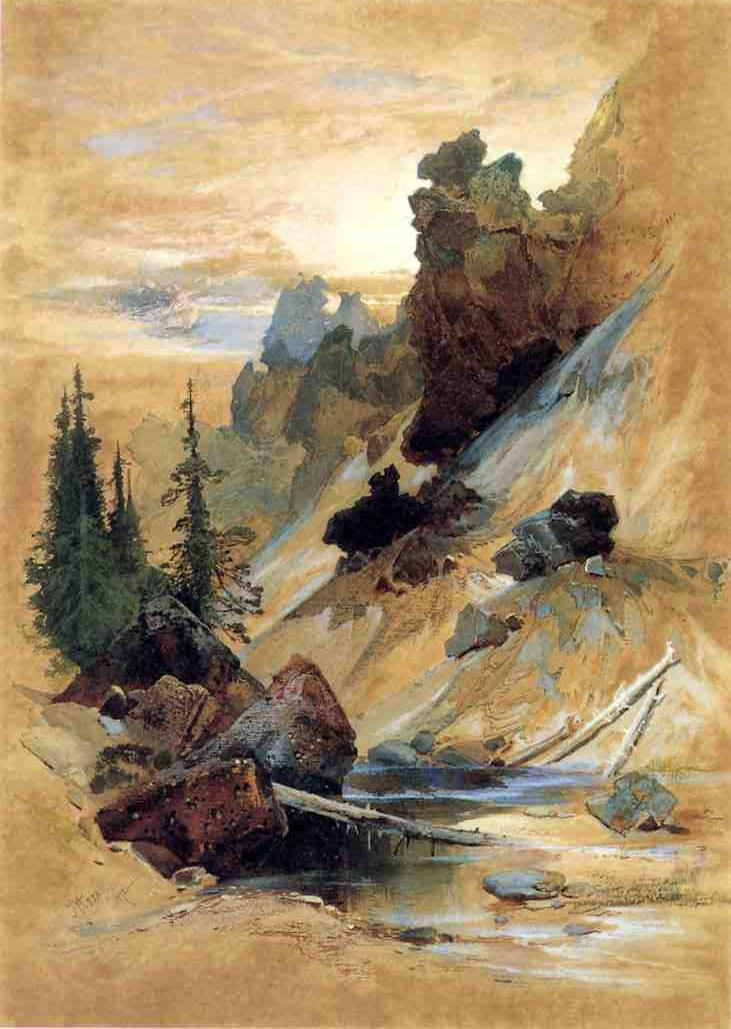
Thomas Moran, a guest artist on the expedition, painted The Devil's Den on Cascade Creek.

After leaving Bottler's Ranch, the party took two days to arrive at Fort Ellis where they spent six days recuperating, resupplying and preparing correspondence and specimens for shipment. Three members of the party—Huse, Dixon and Adams departed for California. During this stay, Hayden had the opportunity to respond to a letter from George Allen, his former professor who had to leave the survey before it entered the Yellowstone region:

Fort Ellis, September 2nd, 1871, My Dear Professor Allen, We have just returned having completed our work to our entire satisfaction. We have had an uninterrupted series of successes, without a single pullback. Not an accident has happened to any member of our party-we made a most admirable survey of the Yellow Stone Basin [sic], the Lake, all the Hot Springs. Mr. Jackson made the most abundant pictures. Mr. Moran was filled with enthusiasm and has returned to devote himself to the painting of pictures of the Yellow Stone [sic] region. ... I am sorry that you were not able to see the wonderful things in the Yellow Stone [sic] but when reports come before the world, you will get a pretty clear conception of them. All my party are well and speak of you with affection. Yours most sincerely, F.V. Hayden

On September 5, 1871, the remaining members of the Hayden party, less their military escort departed Fort Ellis en route to Three Forks, Montana, and the Jefferson River valley. They followed the Jefferson up to the Beaverhead River where they camped at Beaverhead Rock 45°23′11″N 112°27′35″W on September 9, 1871. Jackson took the first photographs of Beaverhead Rock. They continued south, eventually crossing the divide near Red Rock River. By the evening of September 14, 1871, they were camped on Medicine Lodge Creek in Idaho. They followed Medicine Lodge Creek down into the Snake River plain arriving at Fort Hall on September 18, 1871, camping where they had camped during their inbound journey on June 21, 1871. At Fort Hall, Hayden wrote Spencer Baird in his Report No. 10 (excerpted):

Fort Hall, Idaho, September 18, 1871 – Dear Professor Baird, I wrote you that we left Fort Ellis the morning of September 5th. We passed down the Gallatin Valley to the three Forks, thence by the Jefferson to its very sources, exploring many of its branches. If you look at Col Raynold's map, you will see that the river was omitted. ... We return from Fort Hall by way of Soda Springs, Bear Lake by Bear River, to Evanston on the Railroad, thence to Fort Bridger where our expedition will close. All is well with us. We are moving along pleasantly without accident of interruption. We perform a good day's work every day. We have not lost a day from storms or anything else since we left Ogden in June last. Yours Truly, F. V. Hayden

By September 29, 1871, the survey party had reached Evanston, Wyoming Territory where they boarded a Union Pacific Railroad train to Fort Bridger, arriving there on October 2, 1871. At Fort Bridger, Hayden officially concluded the survey and disbanded the survey team. Hayden and Peale made their way to Salt Lake City and then back to Washington, D.C. Jackson and Charlie Turnbull at the urging of Hayden traveled to Nebraska where they photographed Pawnee Indians on the Omaha reservation.

== Survey operations ==
Once the survey team was organized and underway, the general route and camping locations would be determined by James Stevenson, the survey manager and director and Stephan Hovey, the wagonmaster. In open country, as they found in northern Utah, the survey party traveled an average of 15 miles (24 km) per day. Routinely after several days of march and when required to rest the party, process their findings and resupply, they would camp at a favorable location for several days.

While camping and on the march, the various scientists, photographers and topographers would venture out in small teams from the main party to collect specimens, make observations and document the flora, fauna, geology and geography of the land. In this regard, Dr. Hayden was just another scientist. Additionally, the hunters would attempt to acquire enough game to sustain the party.

In camp, the scientists would process and document their findings while preparing them for shipment to the Smithsonian Institution at the next available opportunity. Botanical specimens were pressed, dried and labeled. Mineral samples were trimmed, labeled and packaged for shipment. Photographs were cataloged and described. Correspondence was prepared to scientists in the East explaining the findings and progress of the survey. When next the survey party encountered a station that could handle mail or express shipments—usually a town, stage stop or Army facility—the prepared materials and correspondence would be shipped east.

George Allen, the botanist describes a typical day in the early portion of the survey in his journal:

Thursday, June 29, 1871 – After the Camp broke up went with the Photographic corps on a hill overlooking the vale and changed the papers of the pressed plants, while Jackson took pictures ... The hills in this passway to Montana are all of igneous character; but there are other varieties of rock boulders (principally quartzites) indicating a different character to the higher mountain passes around. ... After 12 miles traveled today in which we were rapidly ascending we came to the summit of the Chain—the Divide (Monida Pass). ... At our camp the P.M. five miles from the divide, we have excellent grass and water, and it is understood that we will remain over here one day to recruit. Collected and pressed a large amount of plants. Also found in the streams a number of shells--lymneas and physas. Junction stage station is near our camp.

== Survey members, equipment and transport ==
Note: There are conflicting accounts as to who were Hayden's topographers or map makers. Existing account names Anton Schönborn and Alfred J. Smith. Another account names Henry Gannett and that "many USGS map-making methods and standards were later developed under his leadership, and the USGS Geography Program was established under his direction".

Members	Equipment and transport
Civilian Members; Robert Adams – assistant botanist; George Allen – botanist; John W. Beaman – meteorologist; Bob Bushnell – second ambulance driver; E. Campbell Carrington – zoologist; Joe Clark – hunter; Chester M. Dawes – general assistant (See Henry L. Dawes.); George B. Dixon – assistant to the photographer; J. Wilson Duncan – general assistant; Henry Elliott – artist; Ed Flint – second mule team; John Geiselman – first waiter; Dan Gibson – cook; F. L. Goodfellow – first ambulance driver, in charge of odometer; Henry Greve – second waiter; Ferdinand V. Hayden – Survey leader; Stephan D. Hovey – wagonmaster; Fred J. Huse – ornithologist; William Henry Jackson – photographer; José – hunter and guide; George E. Kelley – second ambulance driver; George Loucks – mule team; William B. Logan – secretary (See John A. Logan.); Thomas Moran – guest artist; Clifford De V. Negley – general assistant; Albert C. Peale – mineralogist; John Raymond – first cook; Dick Richards – third mule team; Anton Schönborn – topographer; Bob Sherman – second cook; Alec Sibley – fourth mule team; Alfred J. Smith – assistant to the topographer; Joseph E. Smith – hunter; James Stevenson – manager and director; Cyrus Thomas – agricultural statistician and entomologist; Charles Turnbull – physician and general assistant; Military escort; Captain George L. Tyler – escort leader, 2nd Cavalry, Fort Ellis, Montana Territory; Lt. Gustavus C. Doane – Guide, U.S. Army 2nd Cavalry, Fort Ellis, Montana Territory	Twenty-seven horses; Twenty-one mules; Five four mule wagons; Two two horse ambulances; Wet and dry bulb thermometers; Aneroid barometers; Siphon (mercury) barometers; Sextants; Prismatic compasses; Odometers; Clinometers; Tents and stoves

Members of the survey
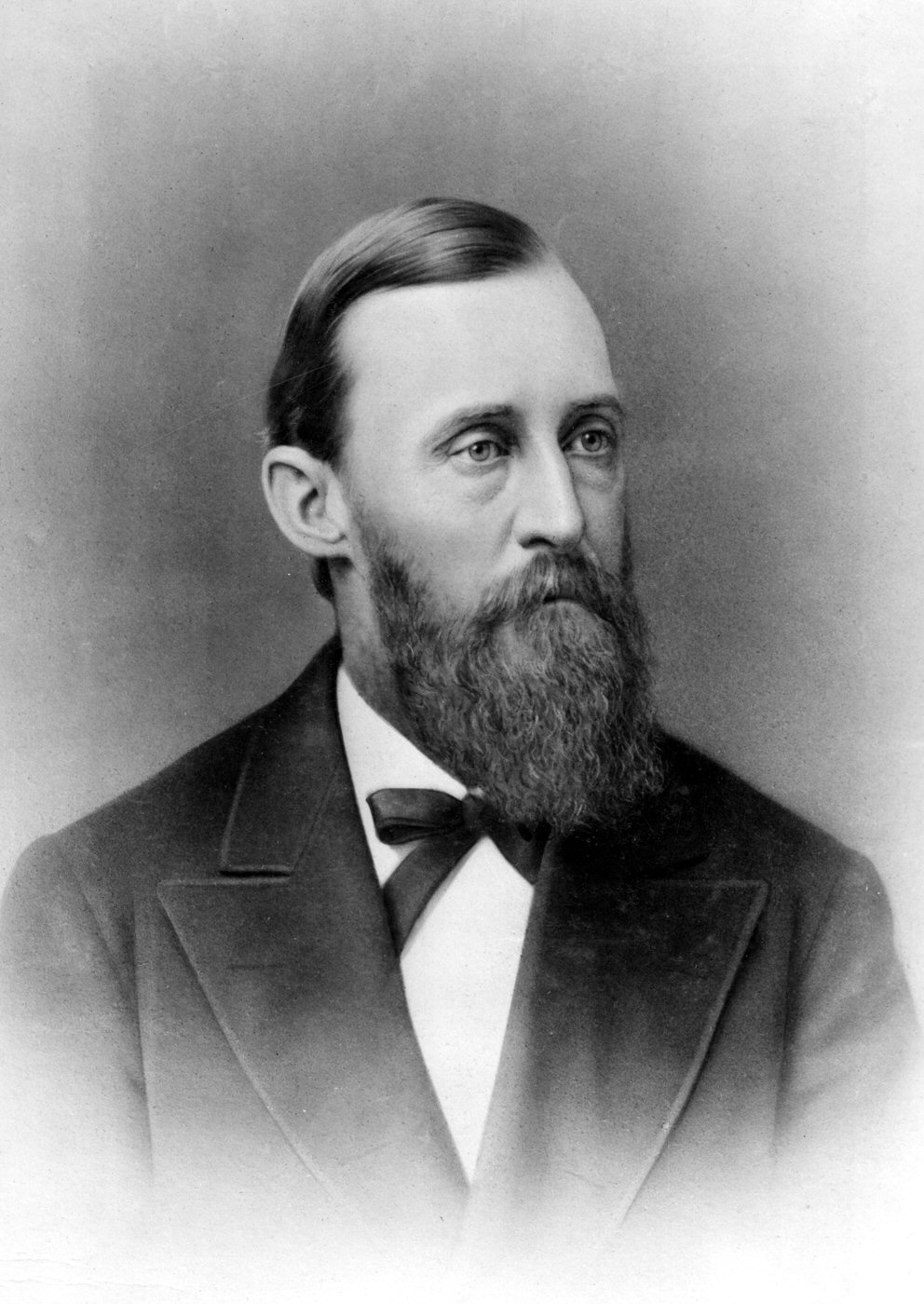
F. V. Hayden, 1870

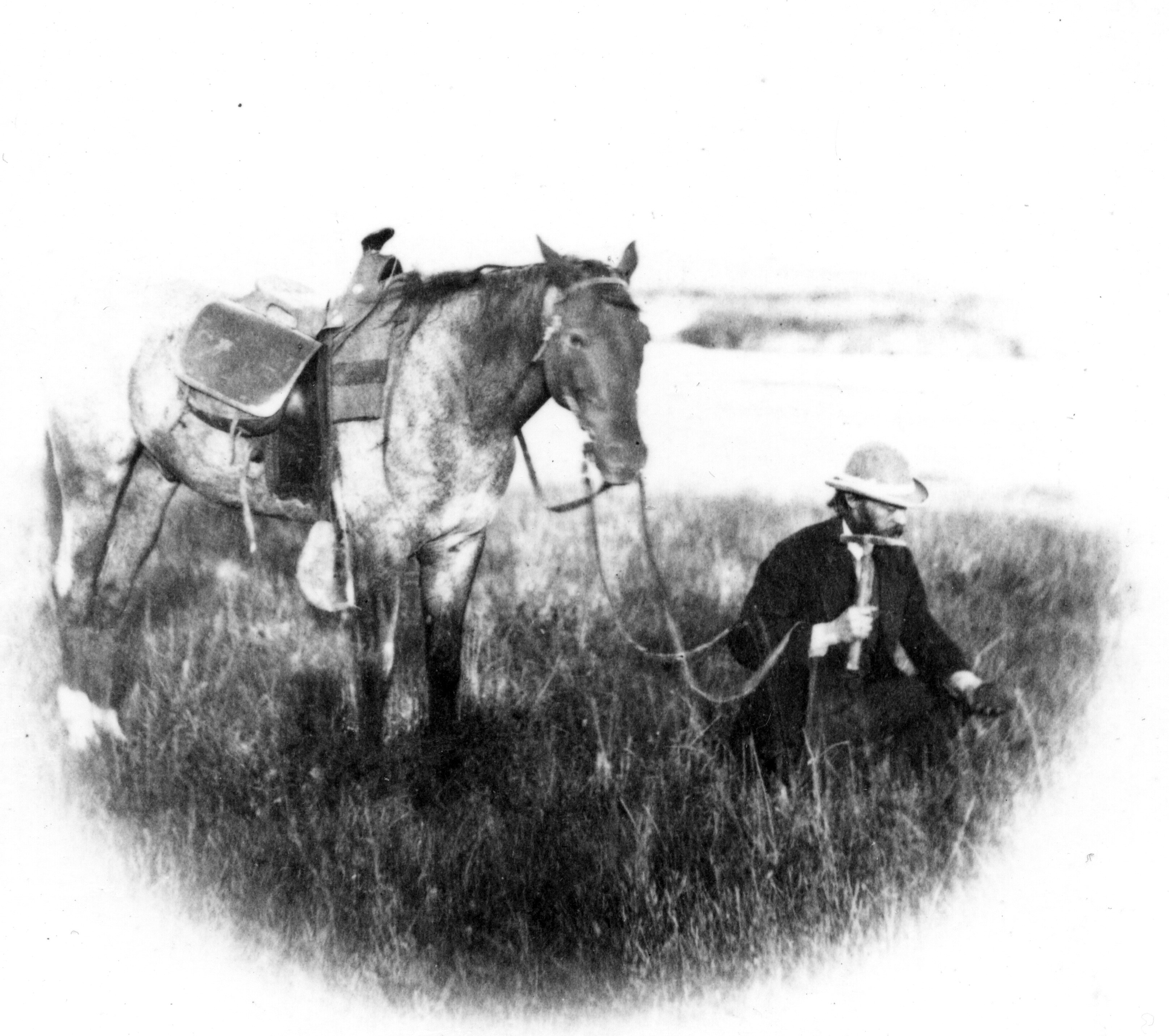
Dr. Hayden at work, 1870 survey

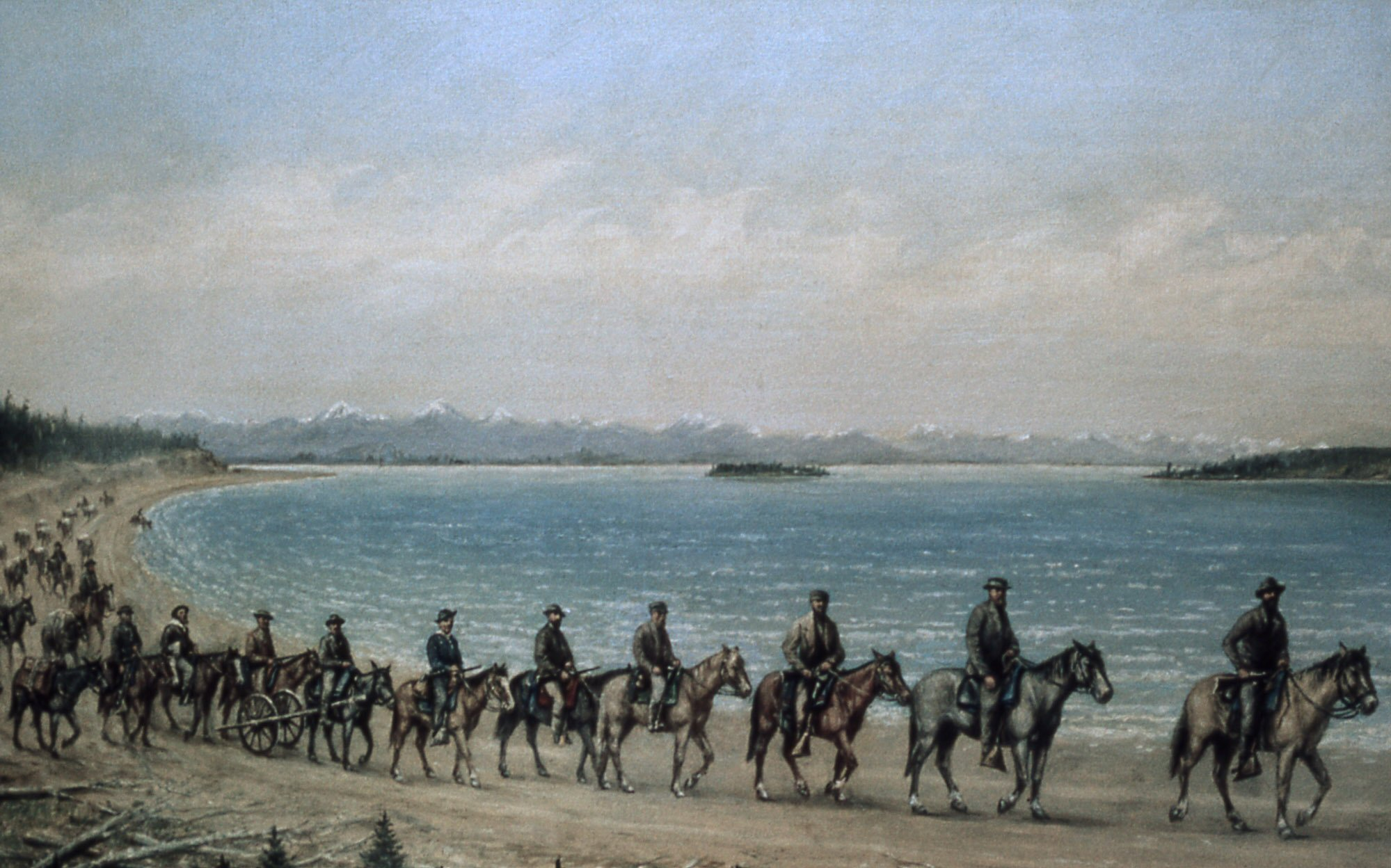
W.H. Jackson painting-en route at Yellowstone Lake

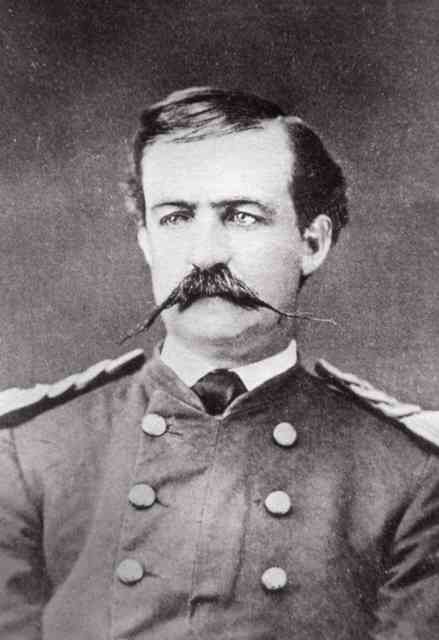
Lt. Gustavus C. Doane, 1875

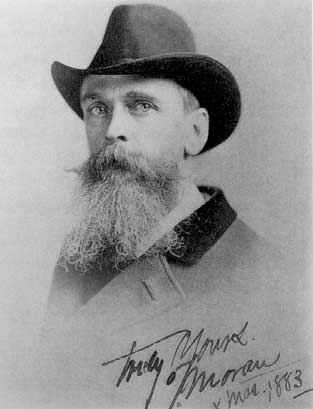
Thomas Moran, 1883

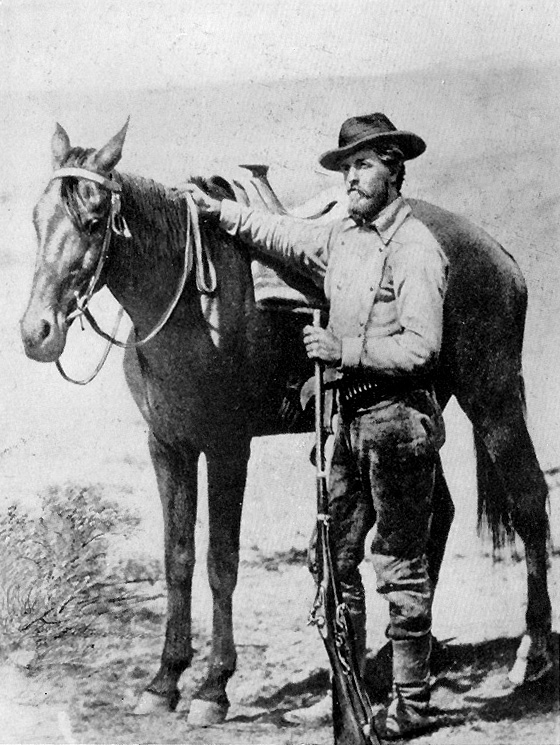
William H. Jackson, 1872

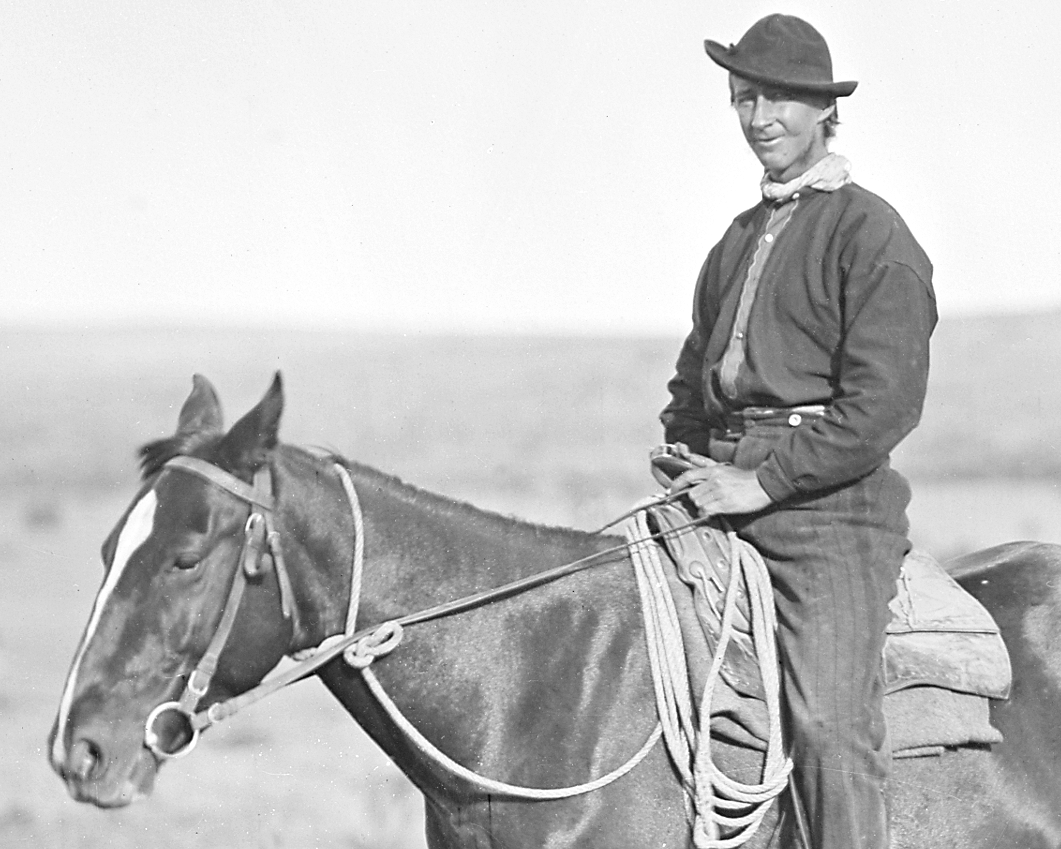
Henry Elliot, 1870

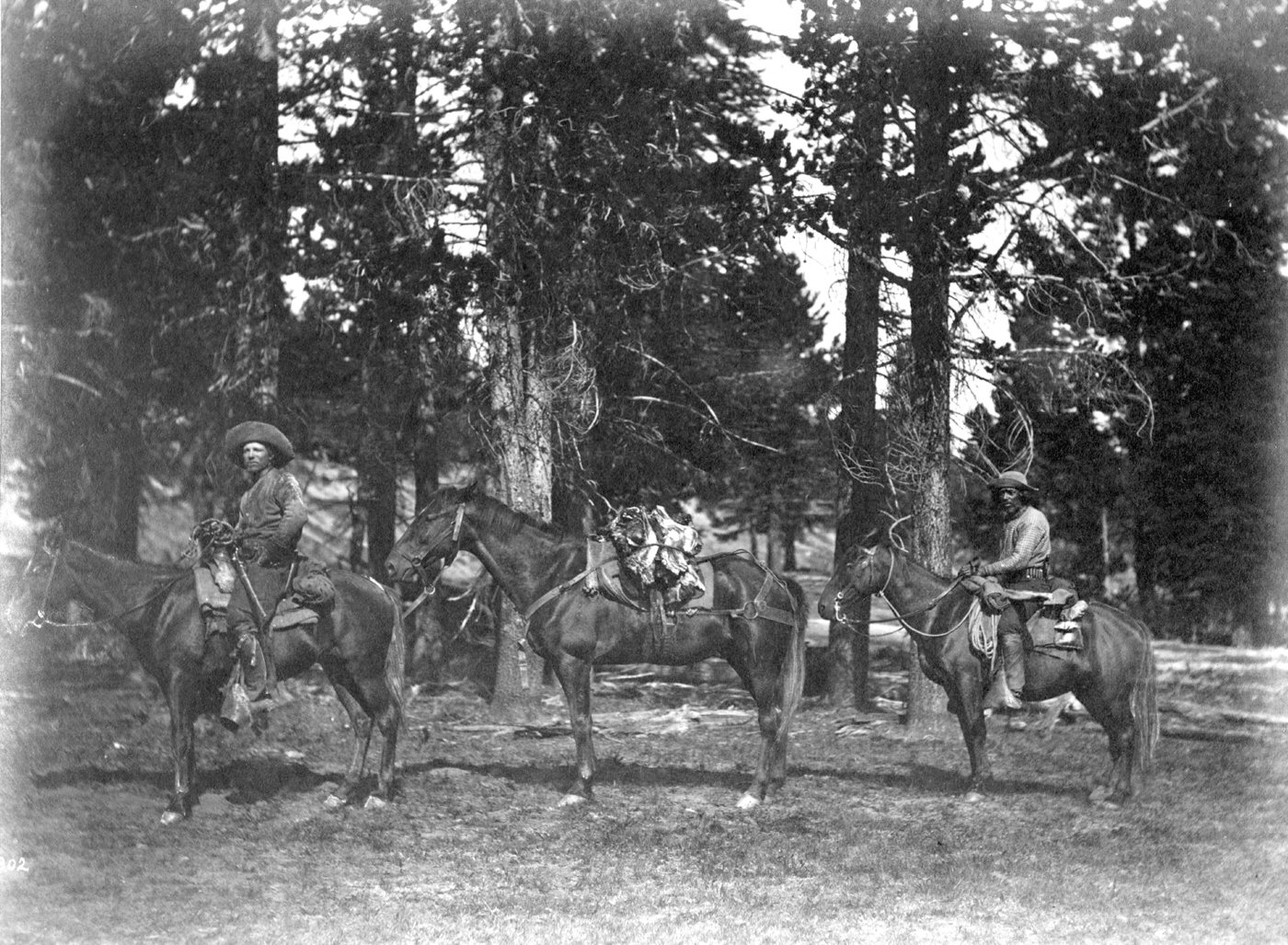
José and Joe Clark, Hunters, 1871

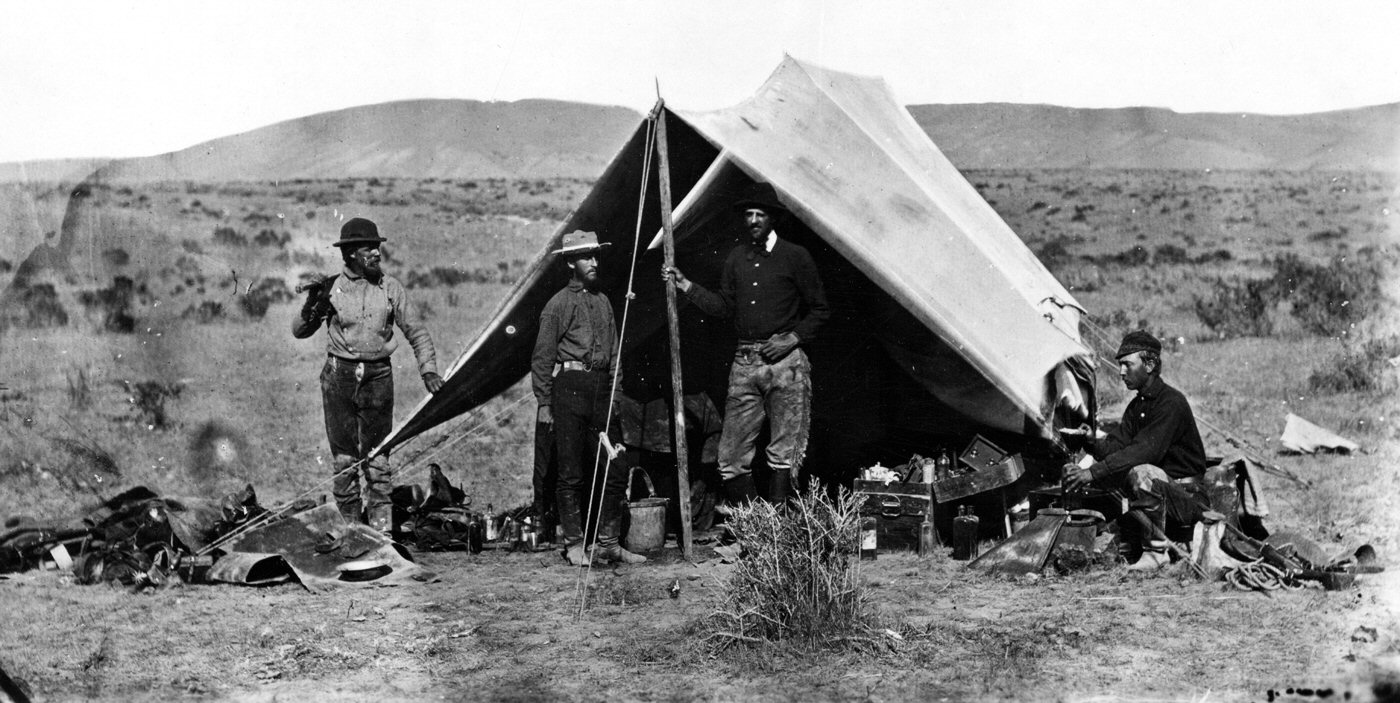
Jackson, Peale, Dixon and Turnbull in camp at Fort Hall, September 19, 1871

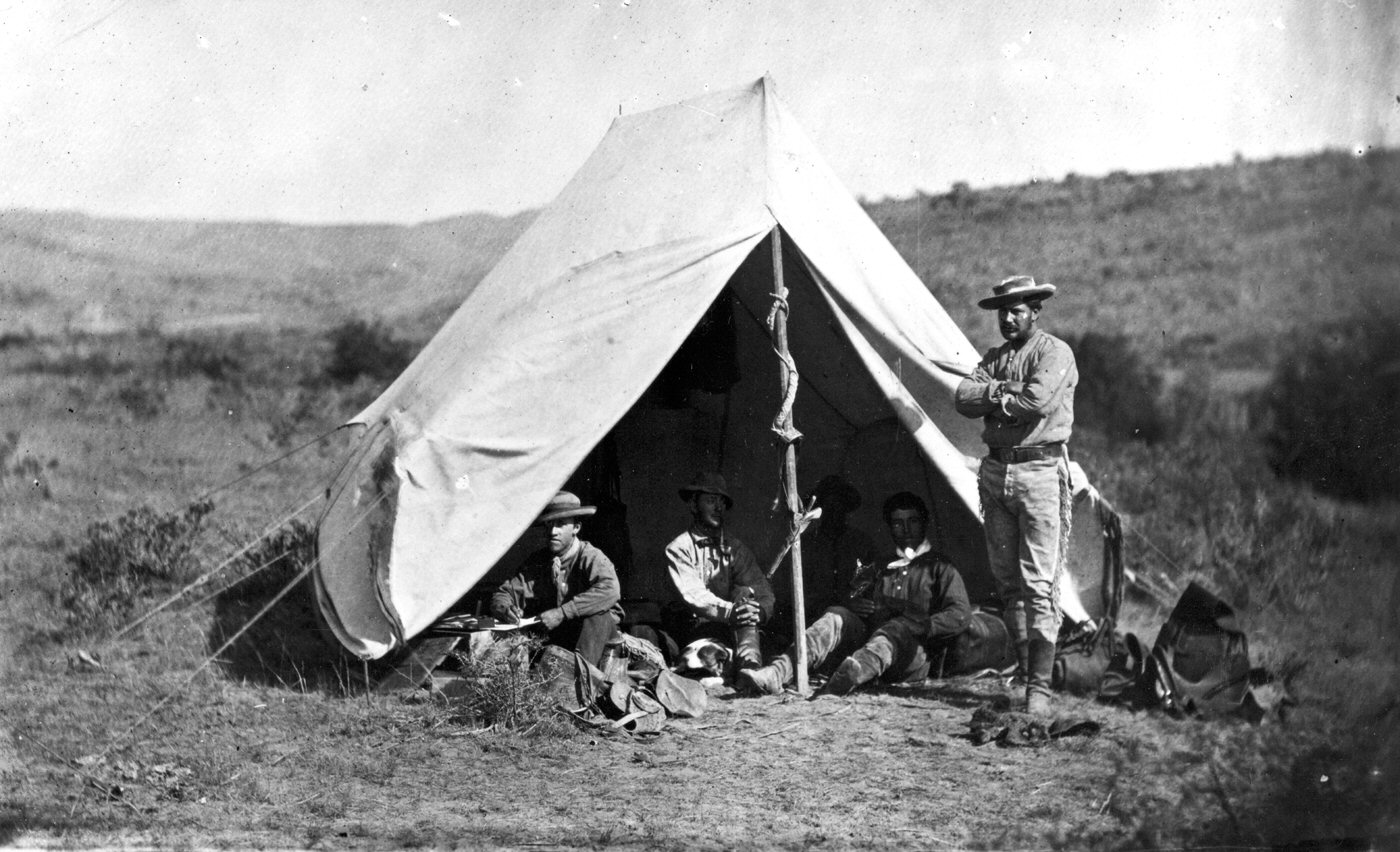
Carrington, Negley and Logan in camp during survey

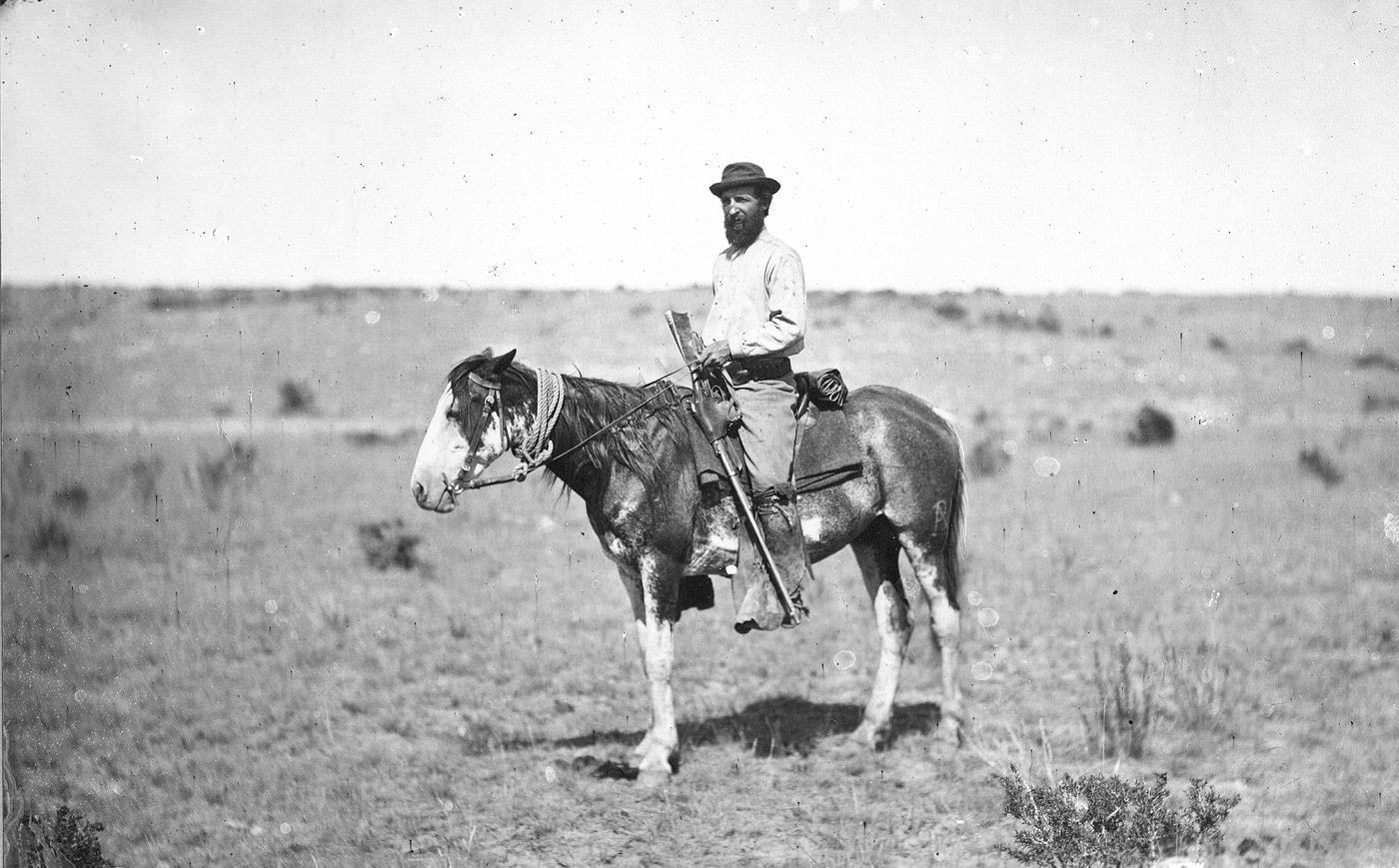
Alfred Smith, Assistant to the topographer, 1871

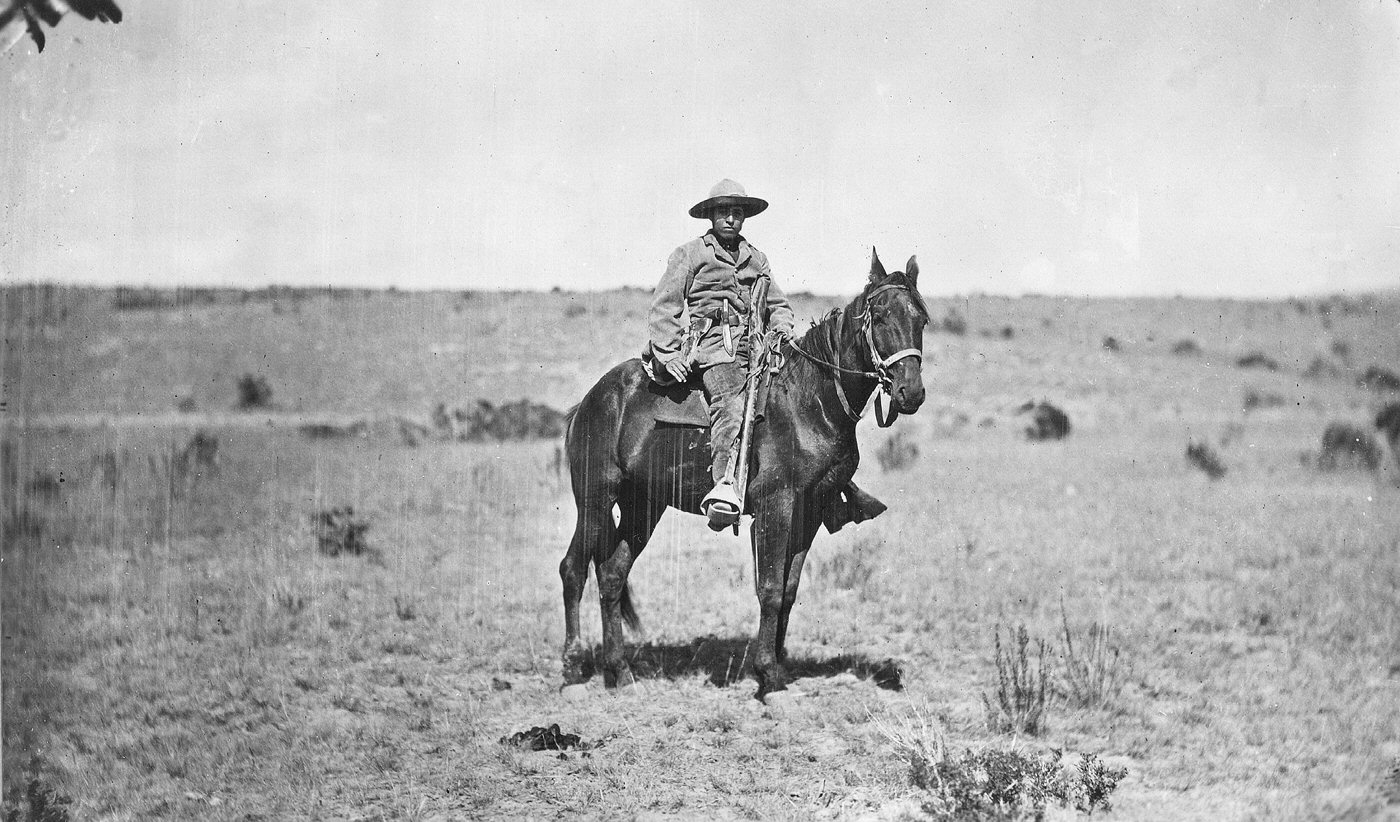
Fred Huse, Ornithologist

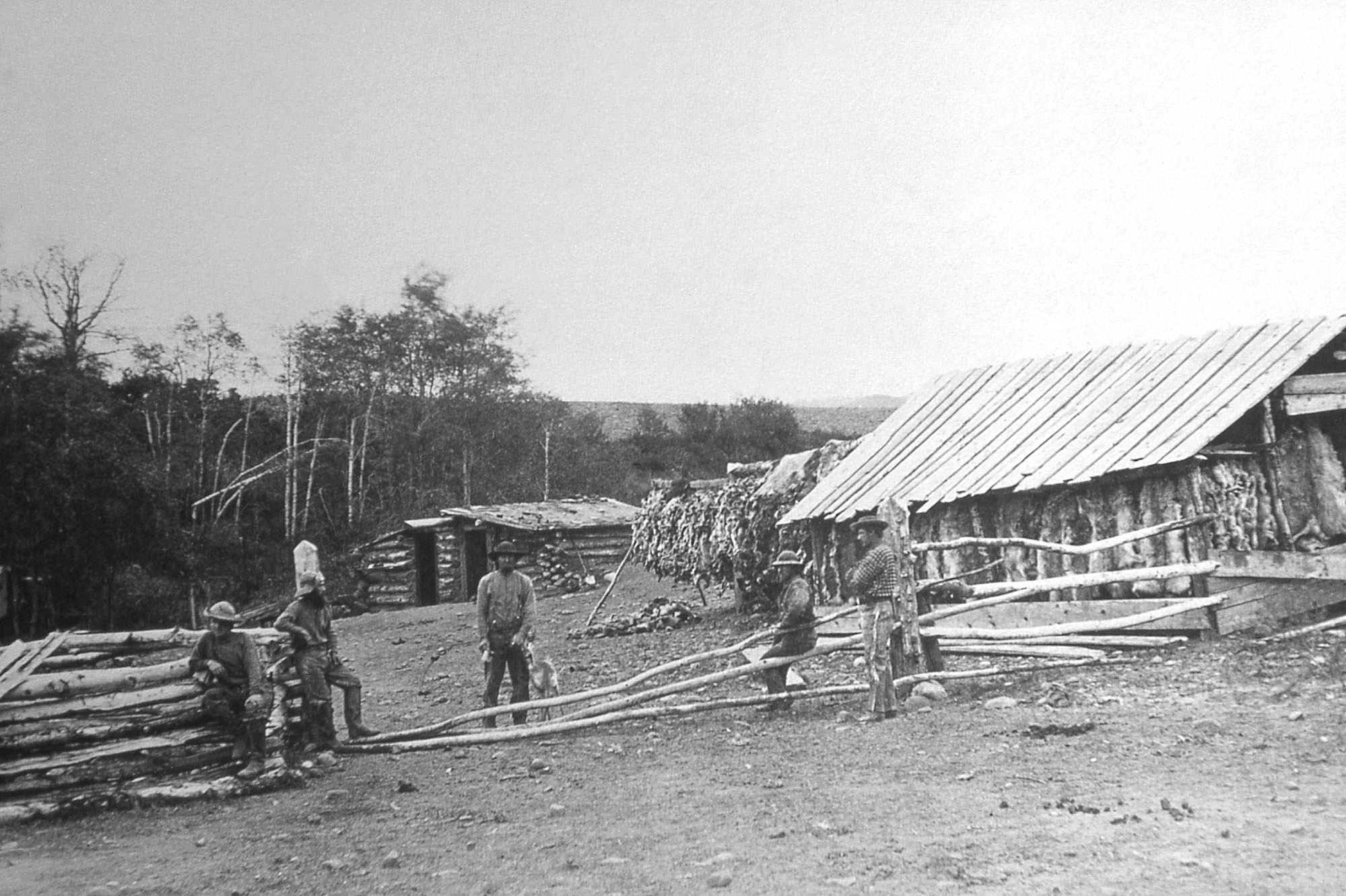
Bottler's Ranch, July 17, 1871 - Albert Peale and Clifford Negley on far right

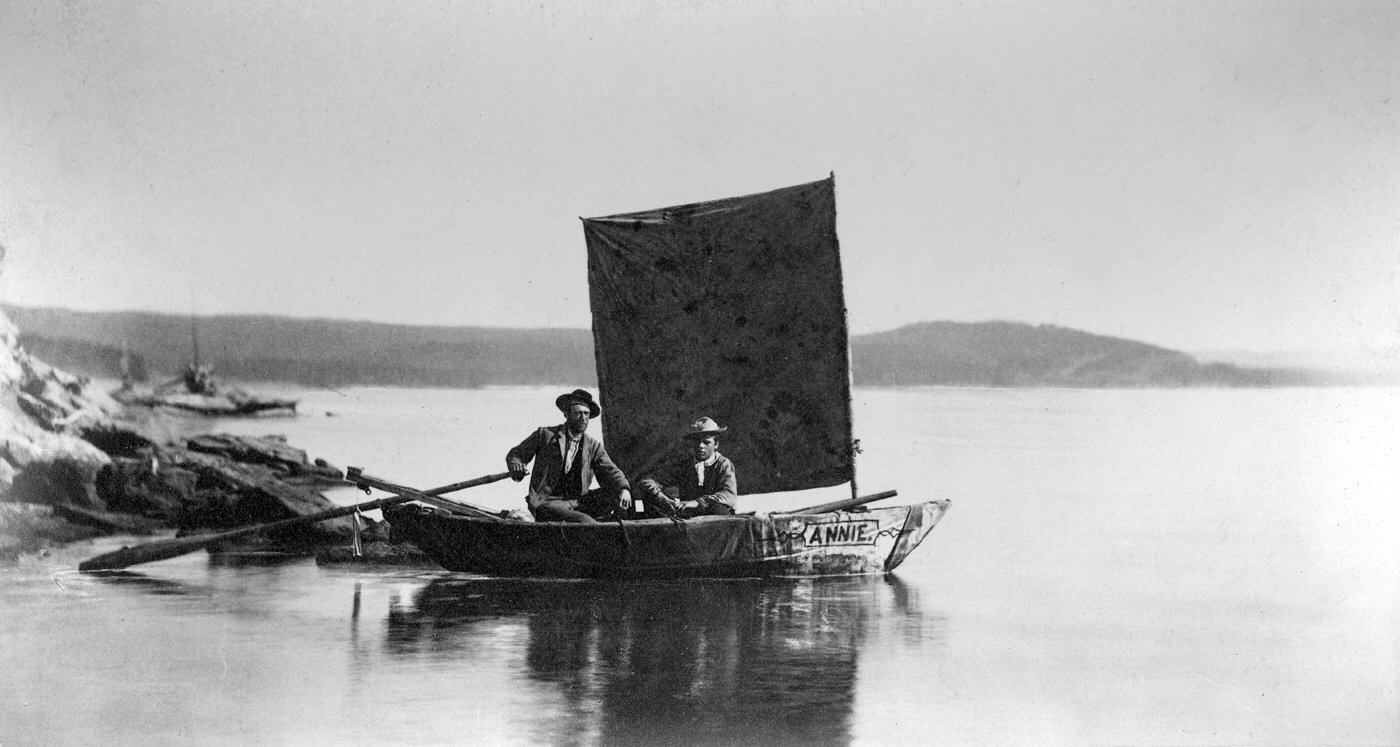
The Annie with Stevenson and Chester Dawes, July 28, 1871

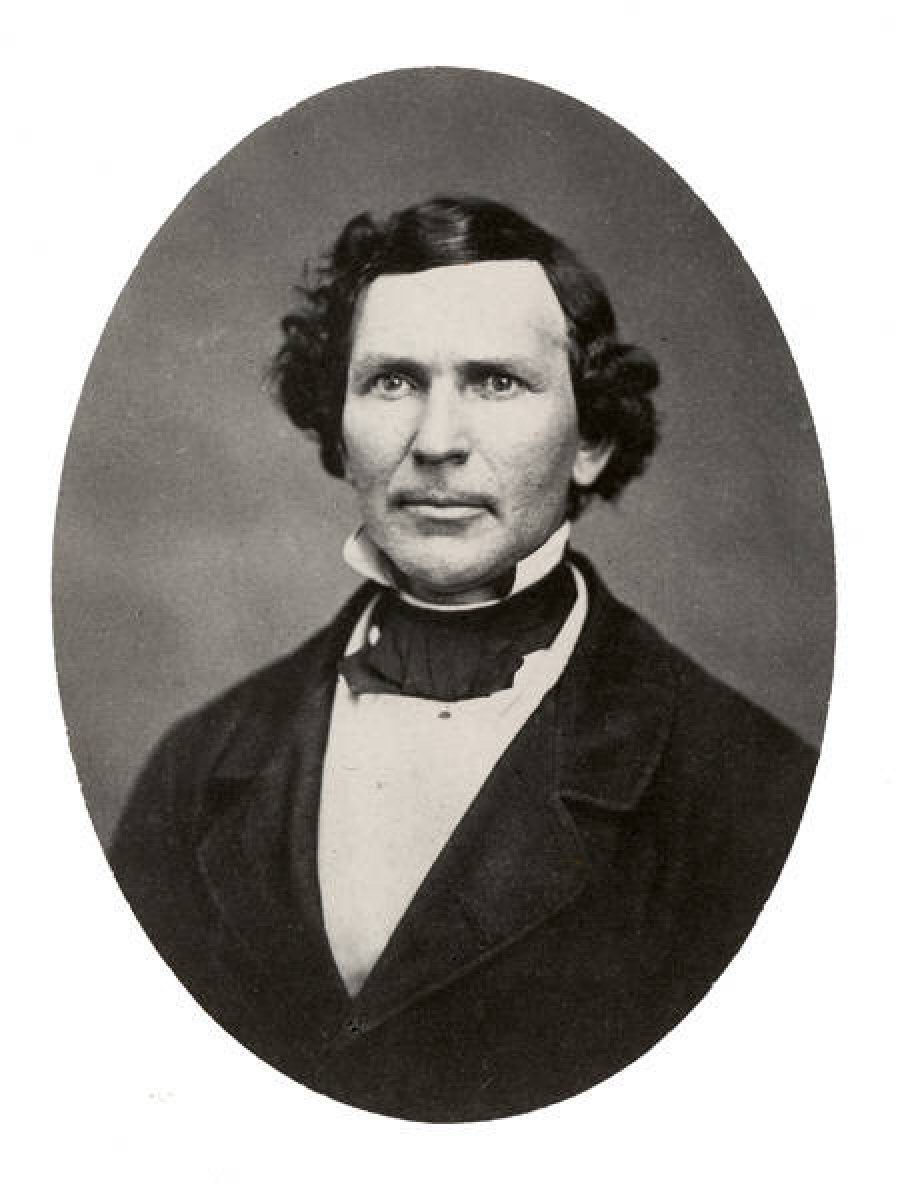
George Allen, circa 1859

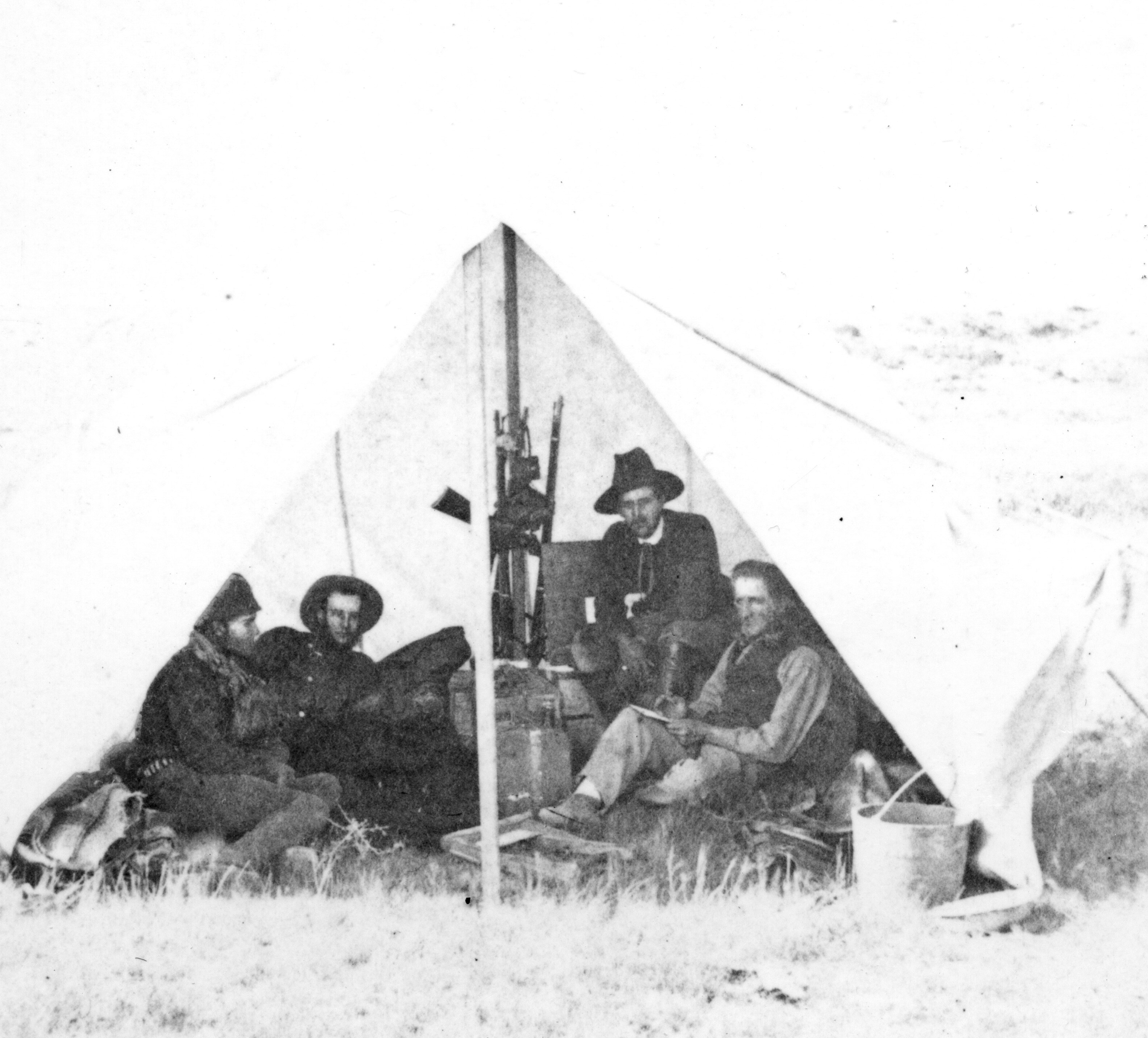
1870 survey-Beaman, Elliot and Thomas are on the right

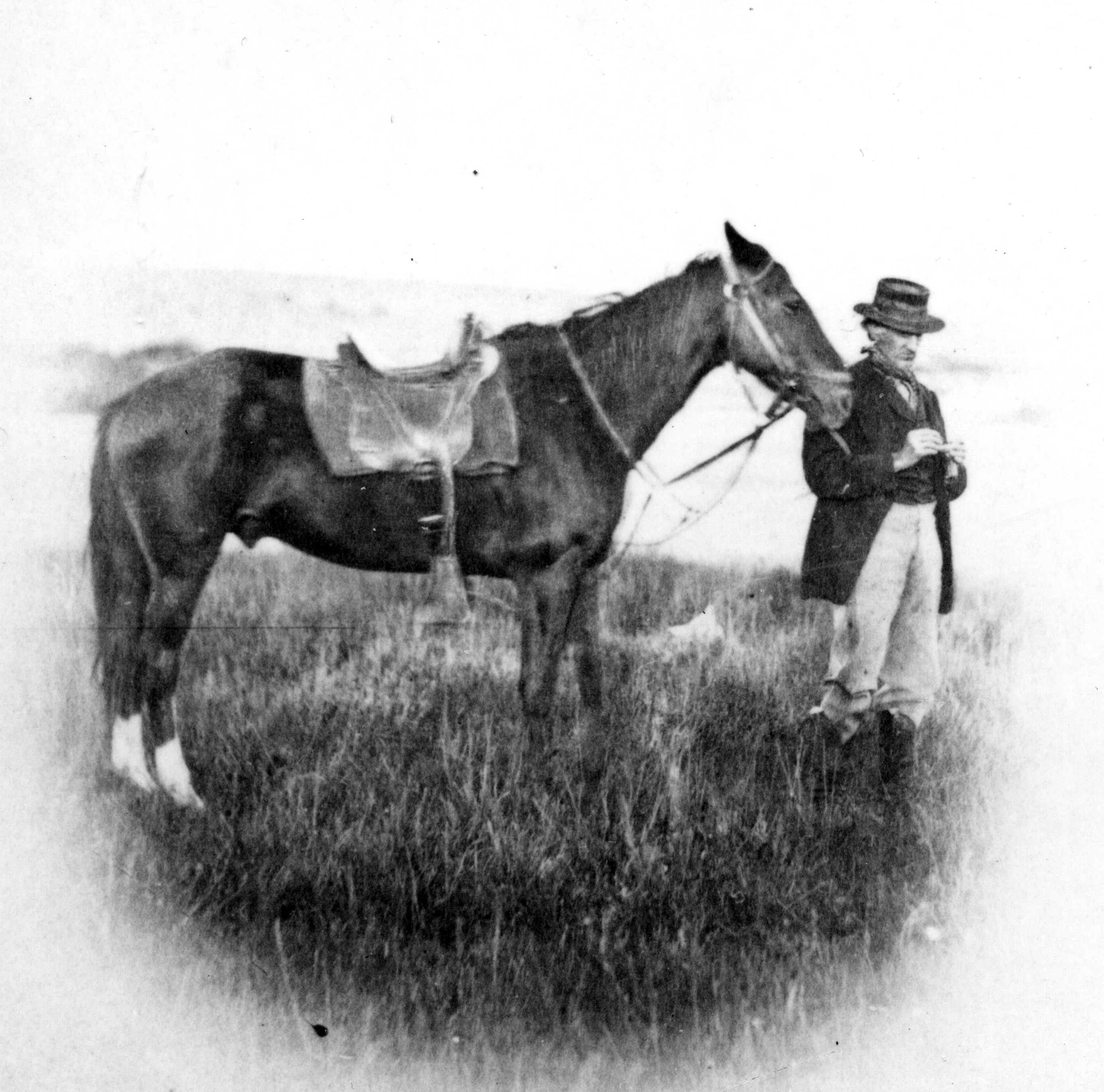
Cyrus Thomas - 1870 survey

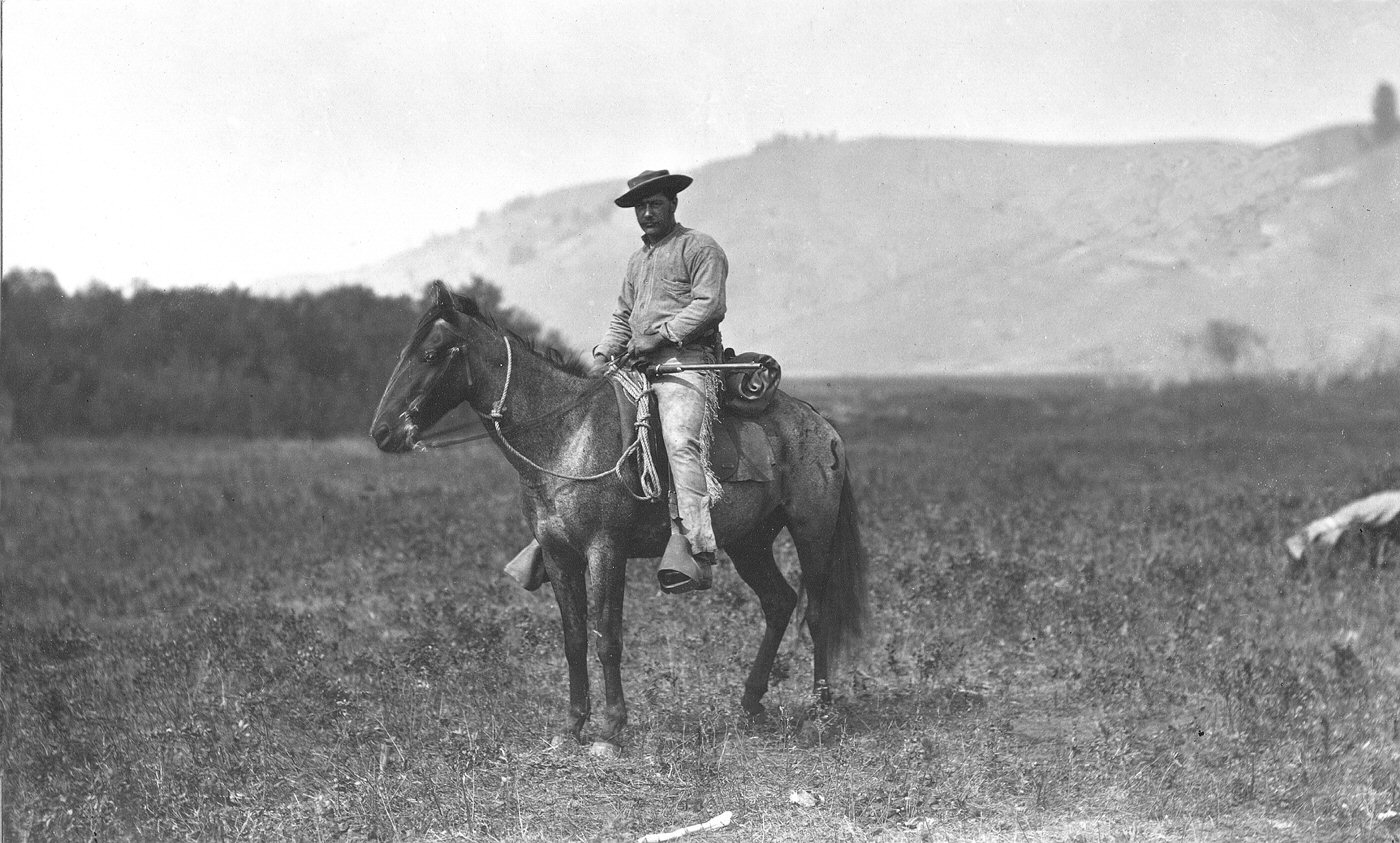
Clifford Negley in the park during 1872 survey

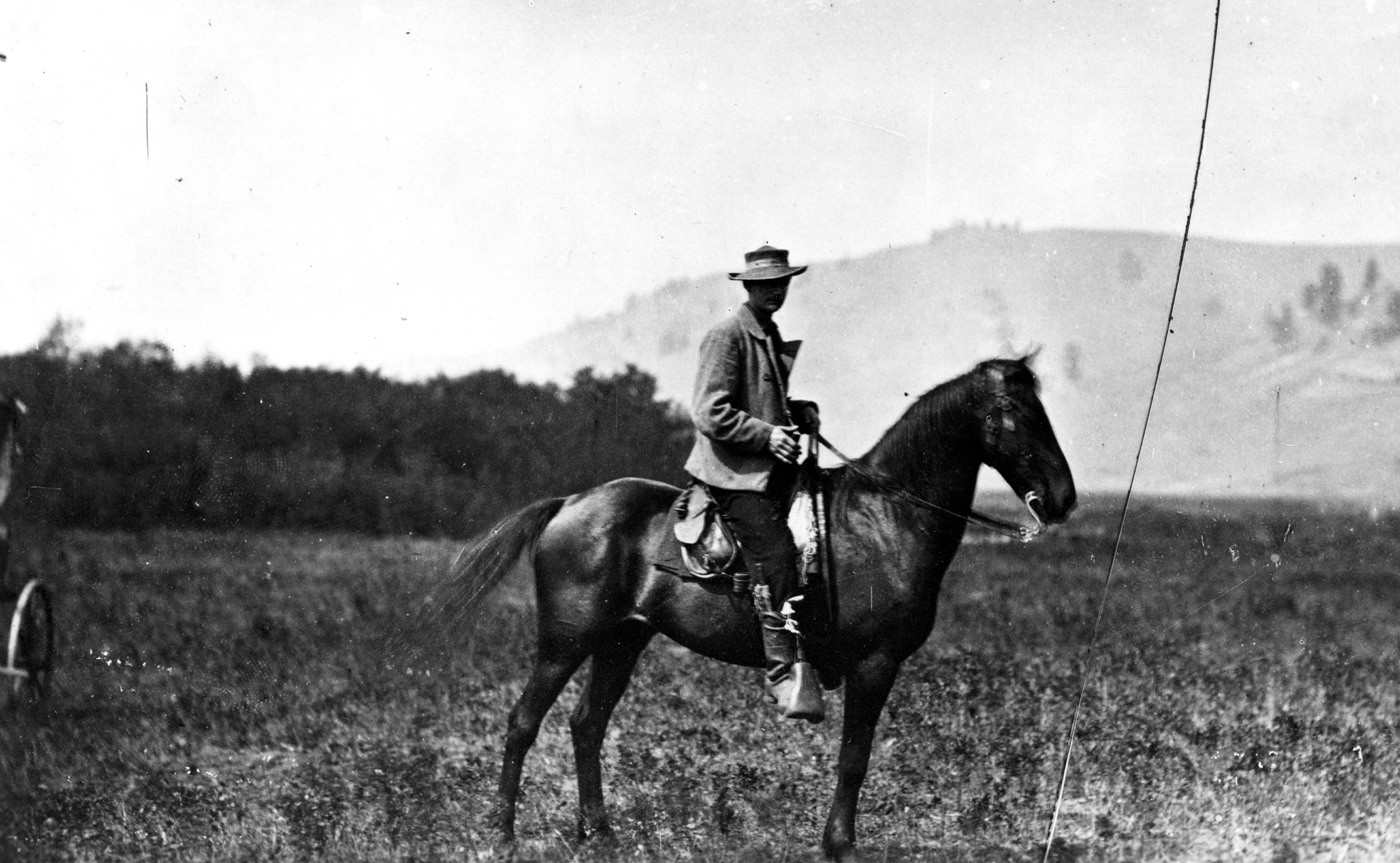
E. Campbell Carrington, Zoologist, 1874 survey

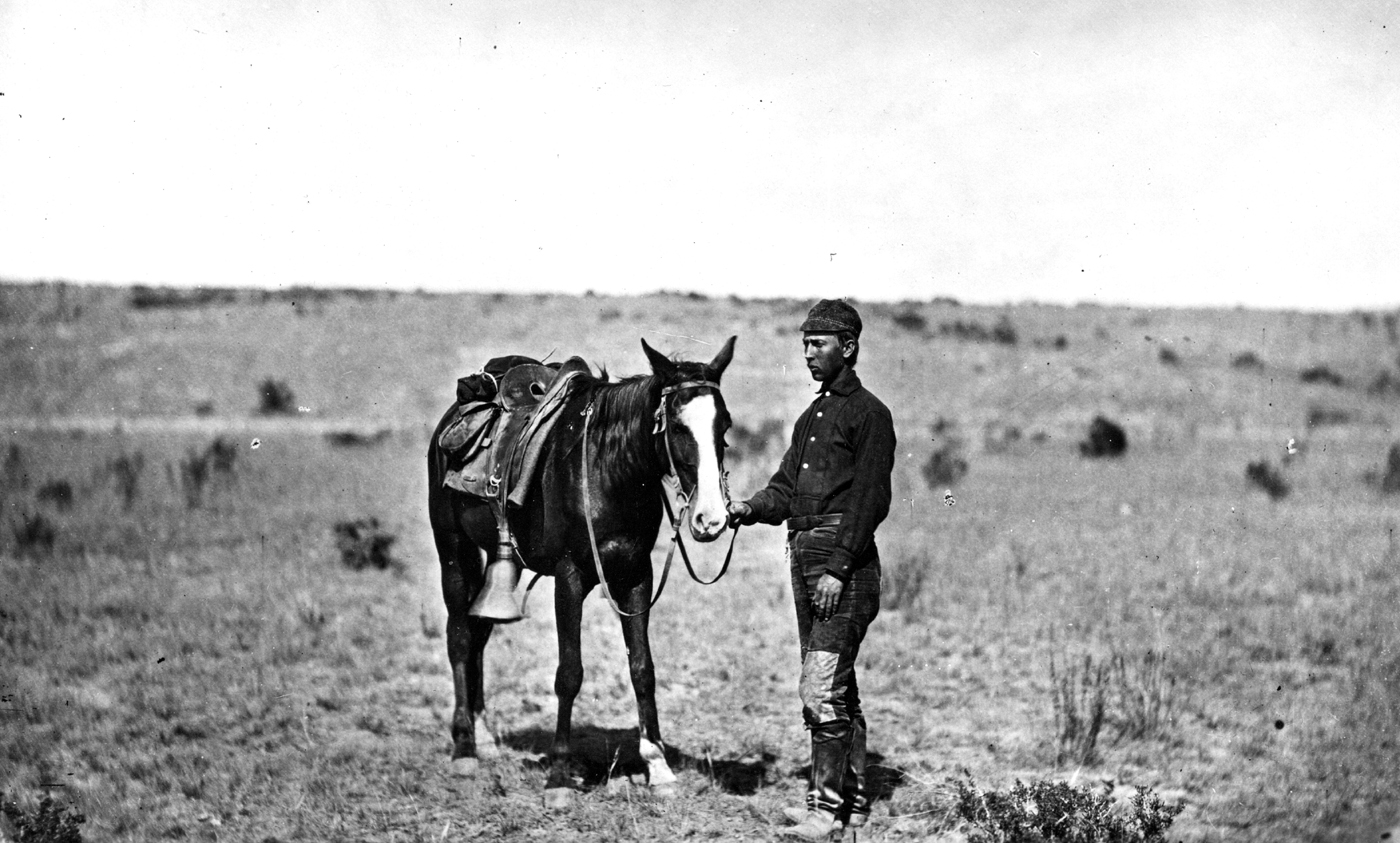
George B. Dixon, Photographer assistant, 1871

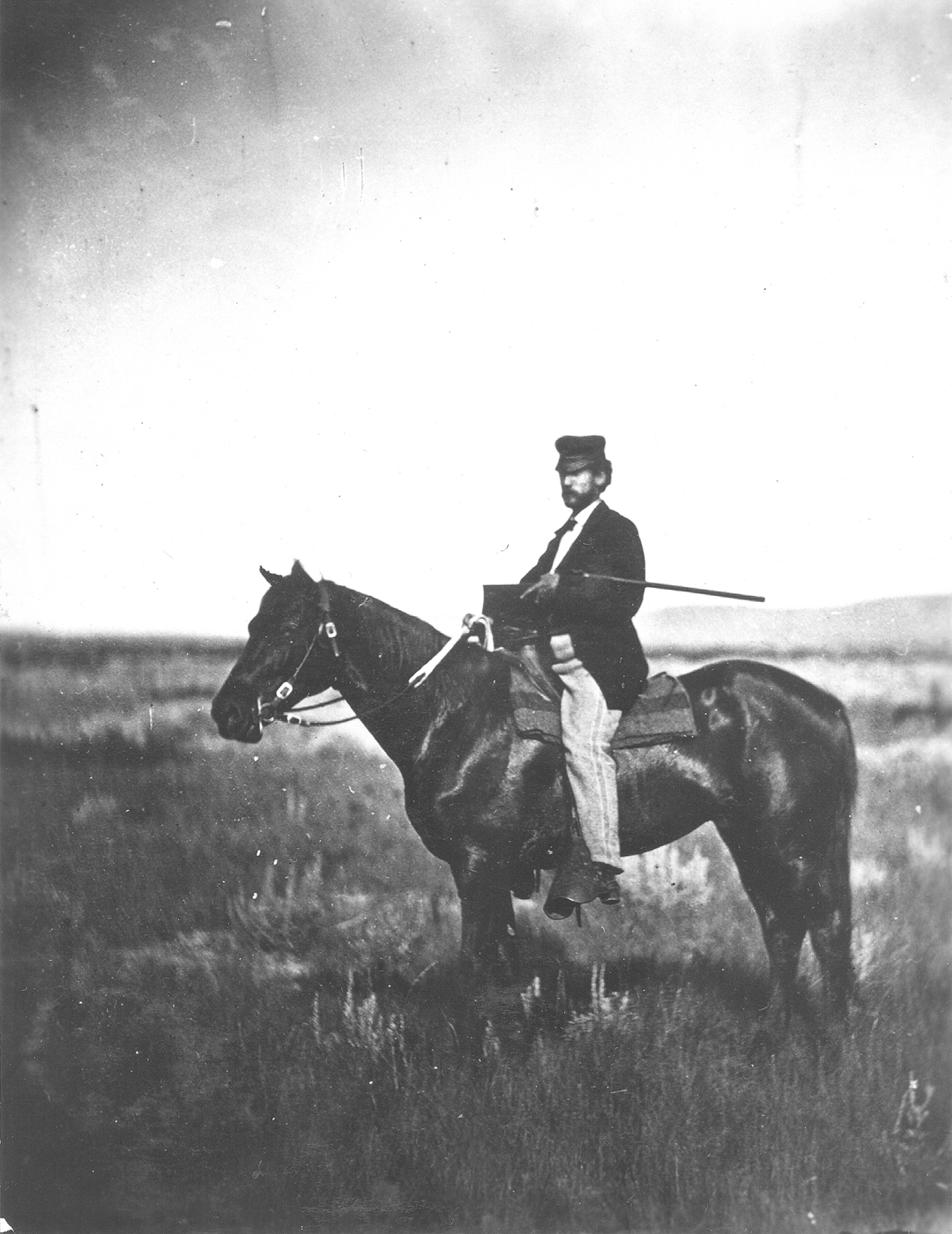
James Stevenson, Survey manager, c. 1871

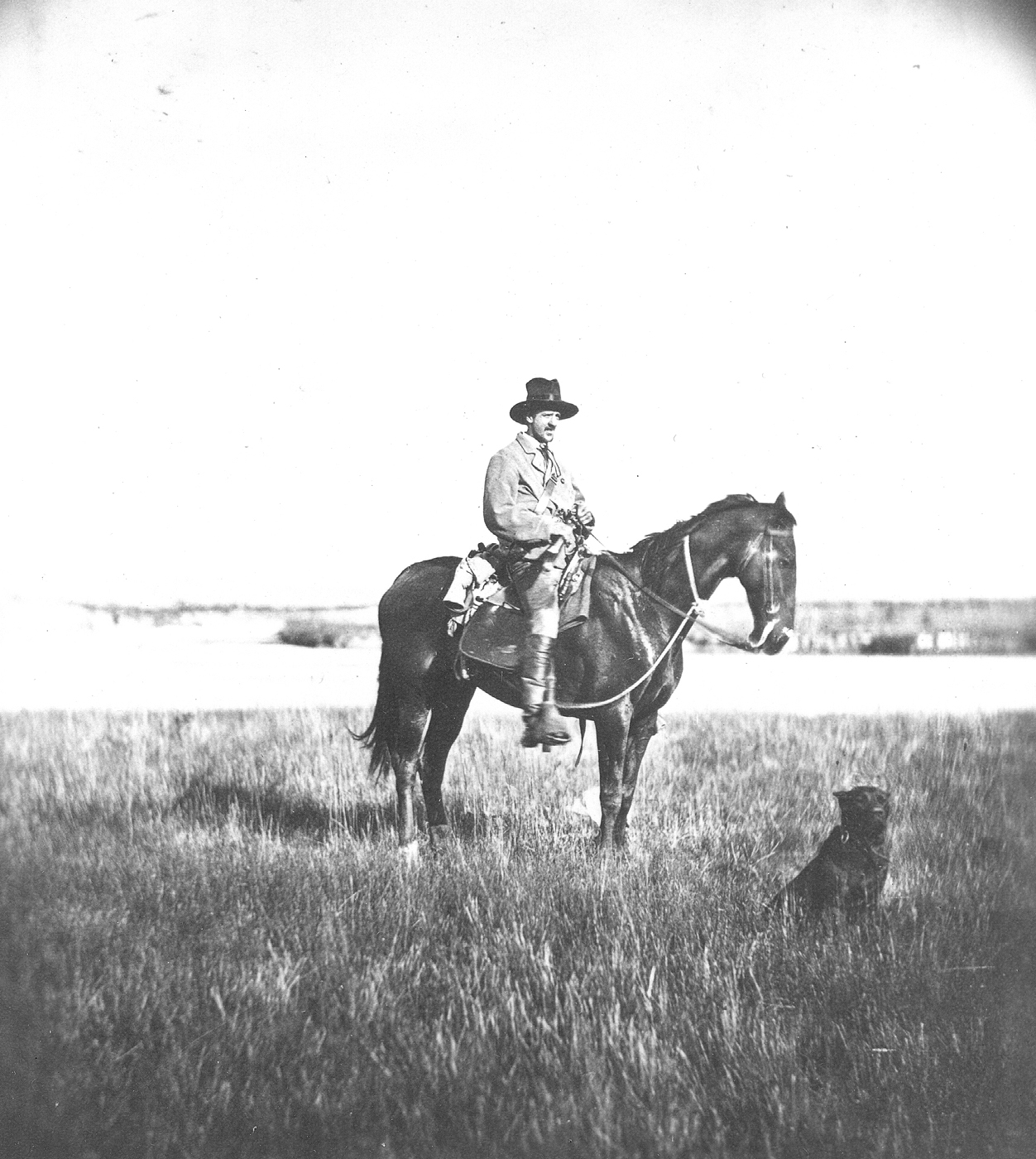
Dr. Charles Turnbull, Physician, c. 1871

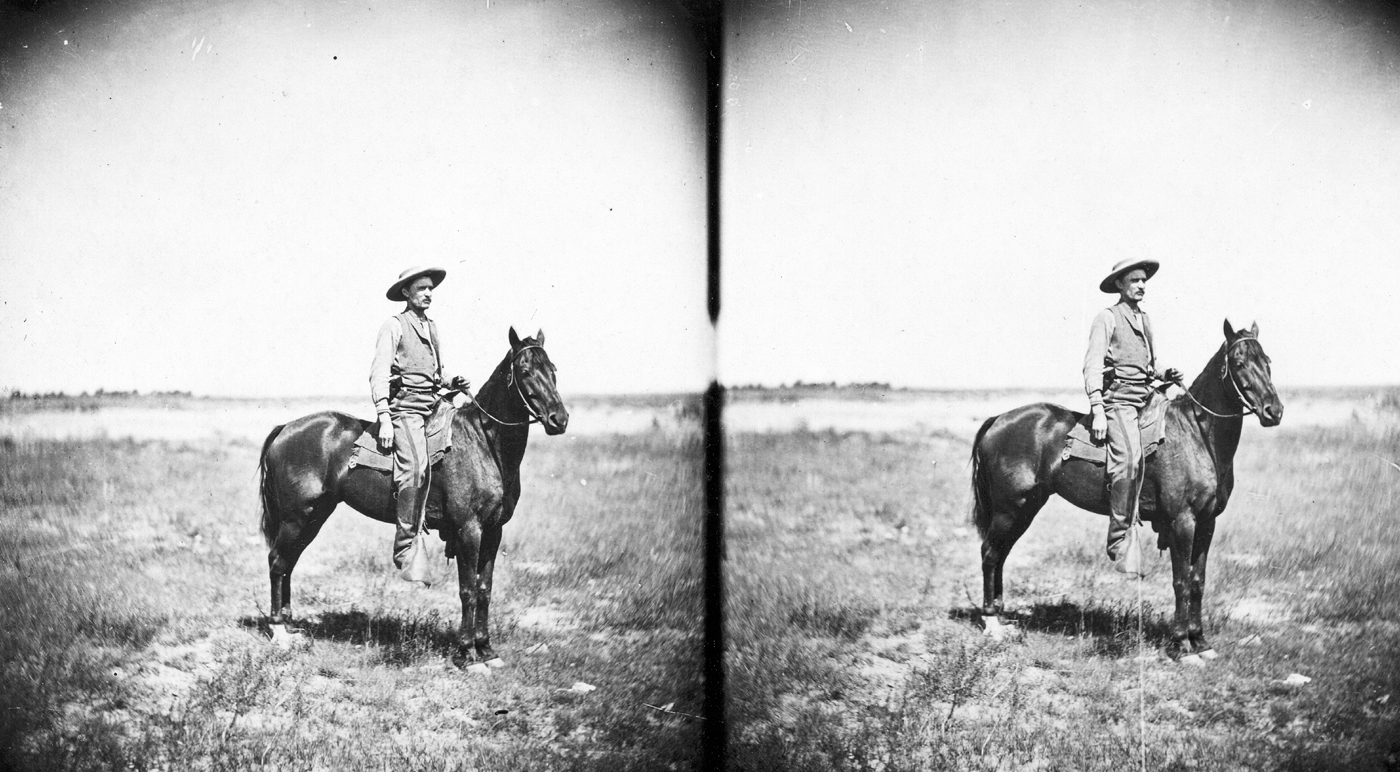
Steve Hovey, Wagonmaster, c. 1871

== Period accounts by members of the expedition ==
- Hayden, F. V. (1872). Preliminary Report of the United States Geological Survey of Montana and Portions of Adjacent Territories being a Fifth Annual Report of Progress. Washington, D.C.: U.S. Department of Interior.
- Peale, Albert C. "The Yellowstone (various subtitles)". Philadelphia Press (15 June 1871, June 29, July 14, July 29, August 8, August 29, October 19, October 25).
- Hayden, F.V. (February 1872). "More about the Yellowstone". Scribner's Monthly. III (4): 388–396.

== Expedition's influence on creation of a National Park ==
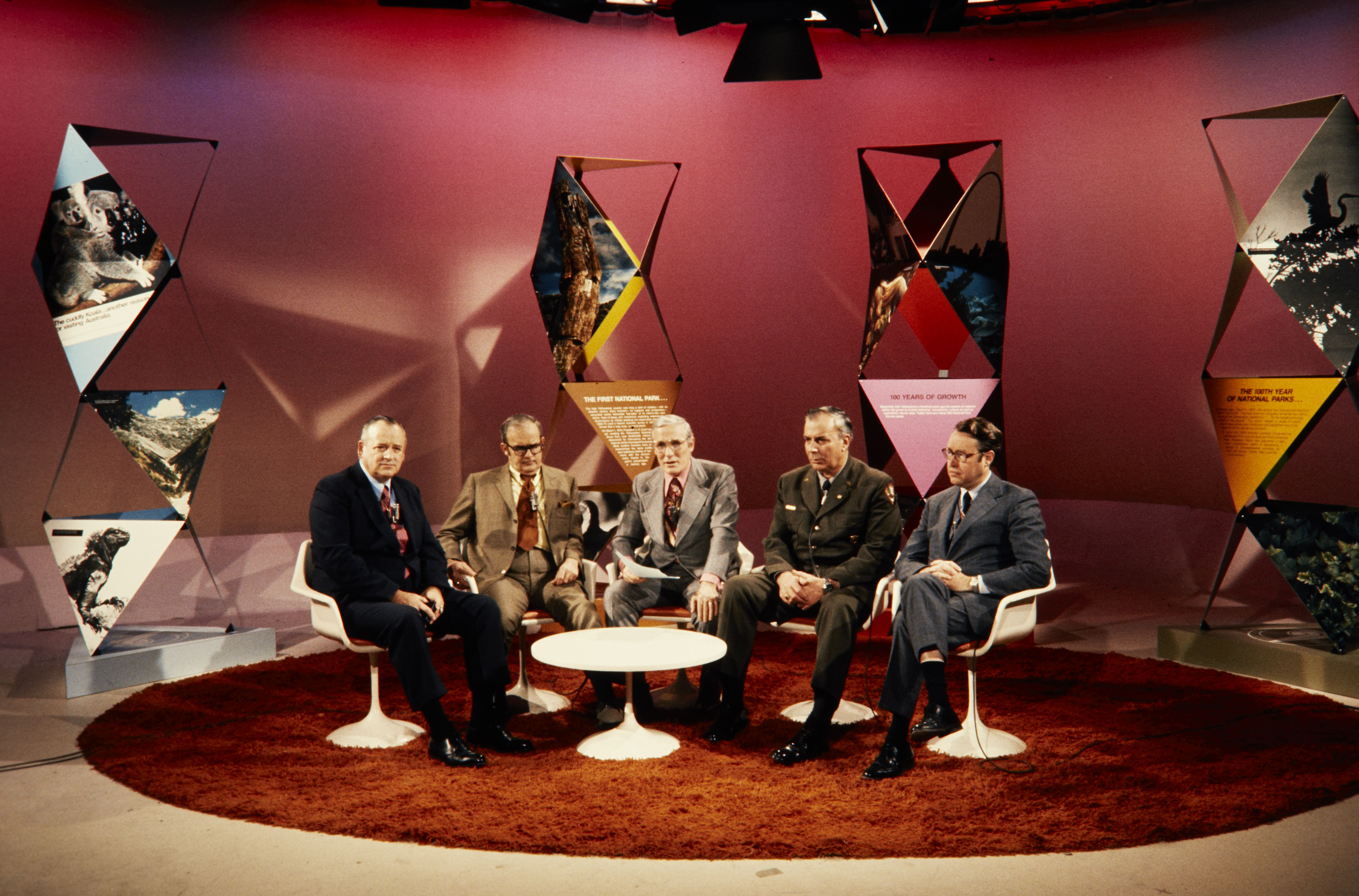
NPS staff sitting on the set for the 1972 Centennial for the creation of the first National Park, in the NBC Today Show. Left to right: George Hartzog, William Everhart, Frank McGee and Jack K. Anderson.

The most important product of the expedition, in addition to the sketches and paintings by Thomas Moran and the photographs by William Jackson, was Hayden's lengthy report detailing the findings of his party. Hayden, working with Nathaniel Langford and Jay Cooke was so desirous of preserving the Yellowstone region that he even included drawings and descriptions of thermal features from Langford's 1871 articles in Scribners. Hayden presented this report, the photos, sketches, and paintings to Senators, Congressmen, his superiors in the Department of the Interior, and nearly everyone else who could possibly influence the founding of a park. Most importantly, his political connections with Congressman Henry L. Dawes of Massachusetts paid dividends. Dawes had supported financing of the expedition, his son Chester Dawes was a member of the survey team, and Annie, the first boat on Yellowstone Lake, was purportedly named after his daughter, Anna Dawes. Hayden also published articles in magazines with national circulation and spent much personal time and effort trying to convince Congress to establish the park.

On December 18, 1871, a bill was introduced simultaneously in the Senate, by Senator S.C. Pomeroy of Kansas, and in the House of Representatives, by Congressman William H. Clagett of the Montana Territory, for the establishment of a park at the headwaters of the Yellowstone River. Hayden's influence on Congress is readily apparent when examining the detailed information contained in the report of the House Committee on Public Lands: "The bill now before Congress has for its objective the withdrawal from settlement, occupancy, or sale, under the laws of the United States a tract of land fifty-five by sixty-five miles, about the sources of the Yellowstone and Missouri Rivers, and dedicates and sets apart as a great national park or pleasure-ground for the benefit and enjoyment of the people."

When the bill was presented to Congress, the bill's chief supporters, ably prepared by Langford, Hayden and Jay Cooke, convinced their colleagues that the region's real value was as a park area, to be preserved in its natural state. The bill was approved by a comfortable margin in the Senate on January 30, 1872, and by the House on February 27.

On March 1, 1872, President Ulysses S. Grant signed the bill into law, establishing the Yellowstone region as a public park, memorializing the results of three years of exploration by Cook-Folsom-Peterson (1869), Washburn-Langford-Doane (1870), and Hayden (1871).

=== Park features named in honor of members of the 1871 expedition ===
- Carrington Island - named for E. Campbell Carrington
- Mount Doane - named for Lt. Gustavus C. Doane
- Frank Island - named for the brother of Henry Elliot, Frank Elliot
- Hayden Valley - named for Ferdinand V. Hayden
- Moran Point - named for Thomas Moran
- Mount Jackson - named for William Henry Jackson
- Peale Island - named for Albert C. Peale
- Mount Stevenson - named for James Stevenson
- Stevenson Island - named for James Stevenson

== See also ==
- Cook-Folsom-Peterson Expedition
- Washburn-Langford-Doane Expedition
- Expeditions and the protection of Yellowstone (1869-1890)
- United States Geological Survey
