= The Grand Canyon of the Yellowstone (1872) =

1872 painting by Thomas Moran

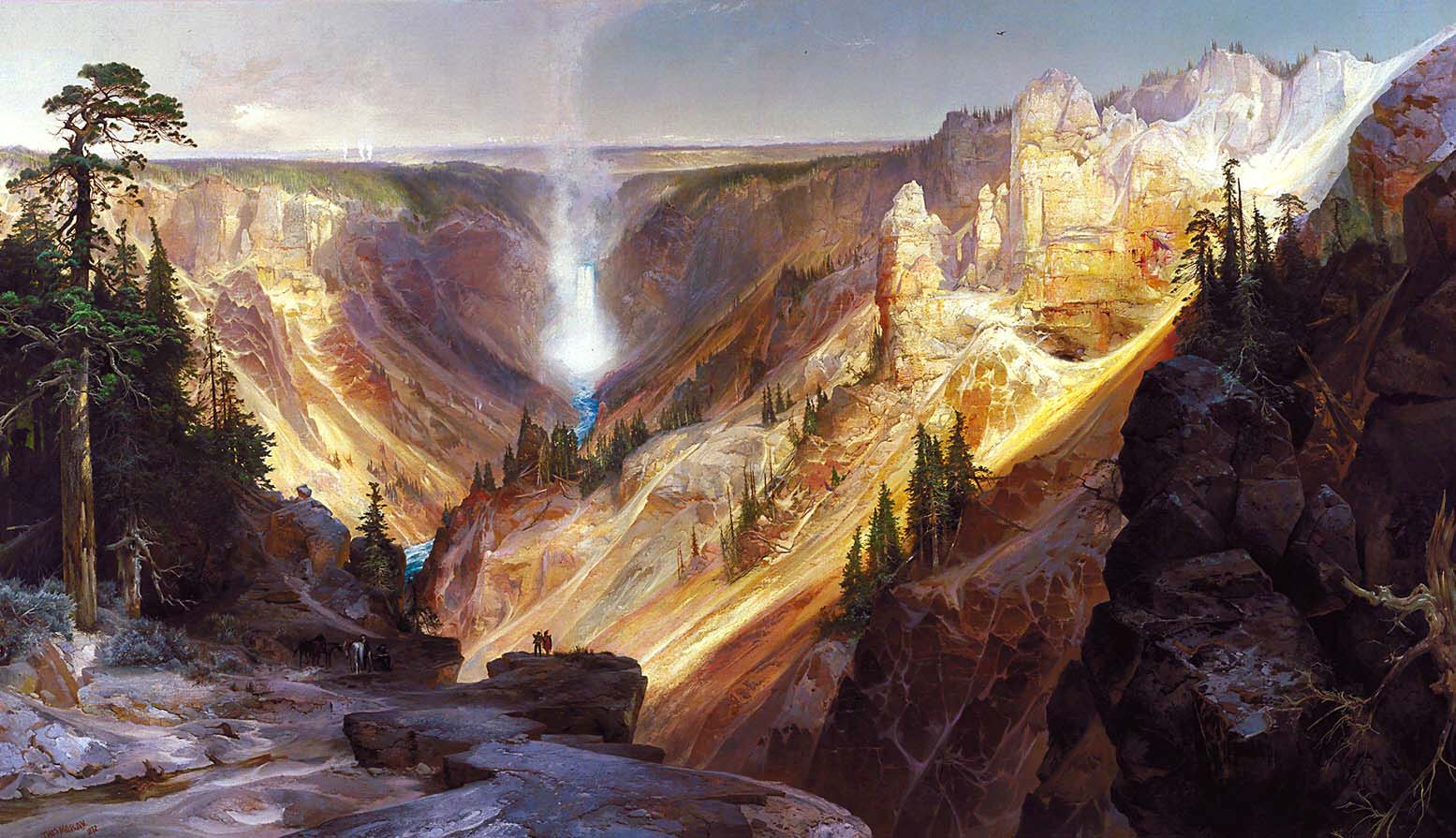
- Artist: Thomas Moran
- Year: 1872
- Medium: Oil on canvas mounted on aluminum
- Dimensions: 213 cm × 266.3 cm (84 in × 104.8 in)
- Location: National Statuary Hall, United States Capitol, Washington, D.C.

The Grand Canyon of the Yellowstone is an oil on canvas painting created by English-American artist Thomas Moran in 1872. It is credited with increasing the American public's interest in conservation efforts. The painting is on display at the U.S. Department of the Interior Museum.

== History and description ==
Moran participated in an 1871 survey, led by Ferdinand Vandeveer Hayden, which explored the area that would become Yellowstone National Park. Moran spent several days sketching the Grand Canyon of the Yellowstone from different vantage points. Hayden's extensive report on the expedition, which included sketches and paintings by Moran, as well as photographs by William Henry Jackson, was instrumental in persuading Congress to preserve the area as a national park. On March 1, 1872, Yellowstone became the world's first national park, when President Ulysses S. Grant signed the Yellowstone National Park Protection Act into law.

The Grand Canyon of the Yellowstone provides an idealized view of the topography of the Grand Canyon of the Yellowstone in the late 19th century. The viewer's attention is attracted to the Yellowstone River running through the V of the canyon, in spite of the river being dwarfed by the rocky, arid landscape dominated by ocher and brown. Green firs and pines punctuate the desolate panorama. Though the painting suggests a primordial environment untouched by civilization, four figures--including a Native American--witnesses to the majesty of nature, can be seen in the foreground.

The large painting was purchased by Congress in 1872 for $10,000 and displayed at the United States Capitol. In 1950, President Harry Truman signed Public Law 81-603 transferring the painting to the permanent custody of the United States Department of the Interior. It is part of the collection of the Interior Museum, where it is on exhibit to the public.

Moran found critical and commercial success with his sketches and paintings of Yellowstone. He would subsequently travel the American West and create many more works of art, including a second painting titled The Grand Canyon of the Yellowstone (1893–1901), which displays a more mature treatment of the same landscape.

== Reception ==
The Grand Canyon of the Yellowstone was met with critical acclaim. The poet and editor Richard Watson Gilder called it the "most remarkable work of art which has been exhibited in this country for a long time." The painting also captured the public's imagination, and influenced the decision to preserve Yellowstone National Park for future generations.

== See also ==
- The Grand Canyon of the Yellowstone (1901)
- Grand Canyon of the Yellowstone
