= Opus 24: Rome, from the Campagna, Sunset =

1867 painting by Thomas Moran

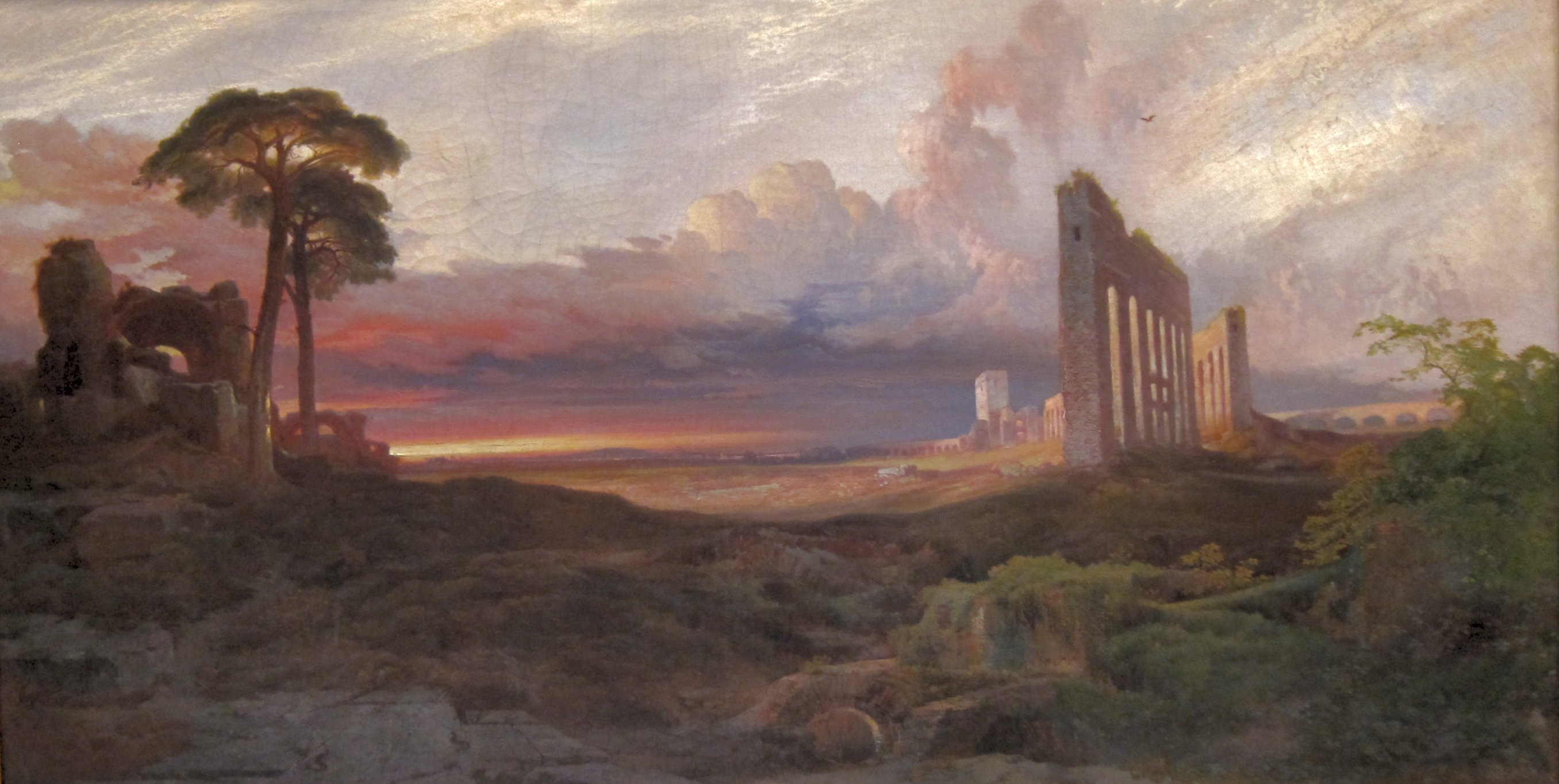
- Artist: Thomas Moran
- Year: 1867
- Dimensions: 63.5 cm × 114.6 cm (25.0 in × 45.1 in)
- Location: Timken Museum of Art, San Diego

Opus 24: Rome, from the Campagna, Sunset is an 1867 oil painting on canvas by Thomas Moran. It is one of 42 paintings Moran included on his "Opus List", a list of the paintings he viewed as his finest work.

== Background and composition ==
From June 1866 to May 1867, Moran visited Europe, a trip that included several weeks in the Campagna region of Italy. During his time in the Campagna, Moran drew multiple sketches of the local landscape. One such sketch, titled Rome near the Claudian Aqueduct, is thought to have been Moran's reference for the final painting.

Opus 24 was one of Moran's first works to be completed after he returned to the United States in 1867.

== Provenance ==
Opus 24 is first known to have been sold in the 1880s, when Moran sold the painting for $75 (equivalent to $2,502 in 2025). In 2005, a relative of the original buyer donated the painting to the Timken Museum of Art in San Diego.

== Sources ==
- Wilkins, Thurman. Thomas Moran: Artist of the Mountains. University of Oklahoma Press, 1998.
