= The Grand Canyon of the Yellowstone (1901) =

1893–1901 painting by Thomas Moran

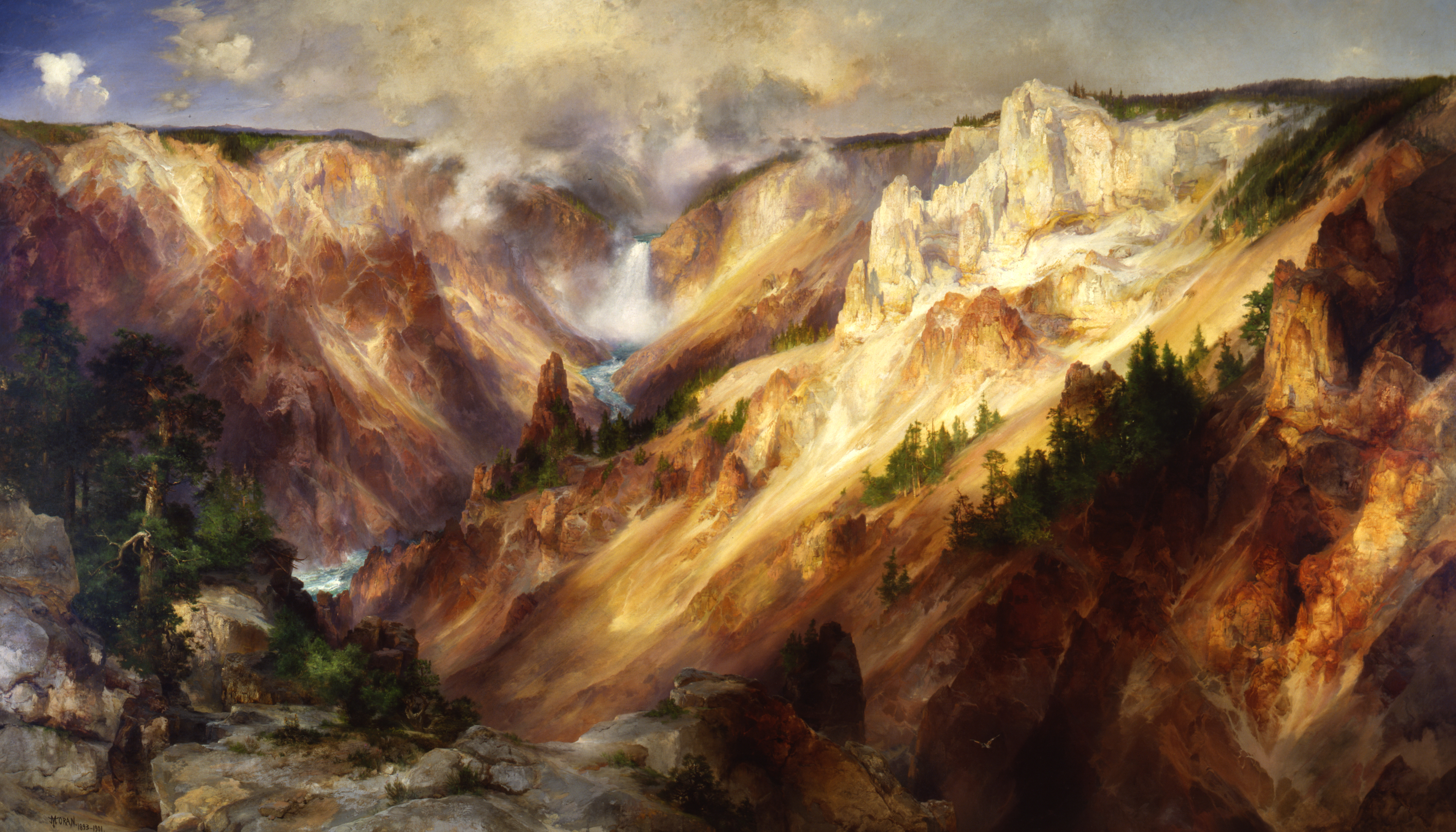
The Grand Canyon of the Yellowstone (1893–1901) by Thomas Moran

The Grand Canyon of the Yellowstone is an oil on canvas painting by English American artist Thomas Moran, created in 1893–1901. It is held at the Smithsonian American Art Museum, in Washington, D.C.

== History and description ==
Moran was part of a geological survey expedition to Yellowstone, in 1871, which, followed by other visits to the American West in the next years, had a lasting effect on him, and inspired him to create several idealized depictions of that part of the country. Moran did a first painting named The Grand Canyon of the Yellowstone in 1872. He spent several days sketching the scene and he moved around getting different vantage points of the Grand Canyon. The expedition had a fundamental effect in the decision to create the Yellowstone National Park, taken by the U.S. Congress, in 1872.

The current painting is from a later time, and he worked in it from 1893 to 1901. It is majestic in its depiction of the Grand Canyon of Yellowstone, in particular of the Yellowstone River, descending from a waterfall to the canyon, and the desolated and mountainous landscape, punctuated with some trees.

According to Audrey Reinhardt, the painting "is impressive not only in terms of its masterful execution and sheer size—14 feet by 8 feet—but in terms of how it codified images of the United States’ natural wonders of the West in the minds of Americans."

== See also ==
- Grand Canyon of the Yellowstone
- The Grand Canyon of the Yellowstone (1872)
