= Mary Nimmo Moran =

American landscape printmaker

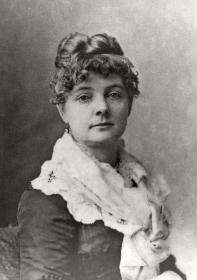
- Born: Mary Nimmo; May 16, 1842; Strathaven, Scotland, United Kingdom
- Died: September 25, 1899 (aged 57); East Hampton, New York, US
- Resting place: Goose Pond, East Hampton, New York, US
- Known for: Etching
- Spouse: Thomas Moran (m. 1862)
- Children: 3

Mary Nimmo Moran (May 16, 1842 – September 25, 1899) was an American landscape printmaker, specializing in etchings. Referred to by Mark Spanner on the Arte website as "perhaps the first woman to prove marriage and family were not insurmountable to success." She was the first of many landscape artists and in 1880 she was known as a landscape etcher. She completed roughly 70 landscape etchings, which included scenes of England and Scotland, as well as Long Island, New York; New Jersey, Florida, and Pennsylvania. In 1881, she was one of eight Americans and the first female elected as a fellow to London's Royal Society of Painter-Etchers. Mary Nimmo Moran's landscape View of Newark from the Meadows is in the collection of The Newark Museum of Art. She was among the earliest American Artists to explore the medium of etching.

Born in Scotland, she immigrated to the United States at the age of five with her widowed father and brother; they settled in Philadelphia. She married American artist and illustrator Thomas Moran, and they had a family together.

== Biography ==
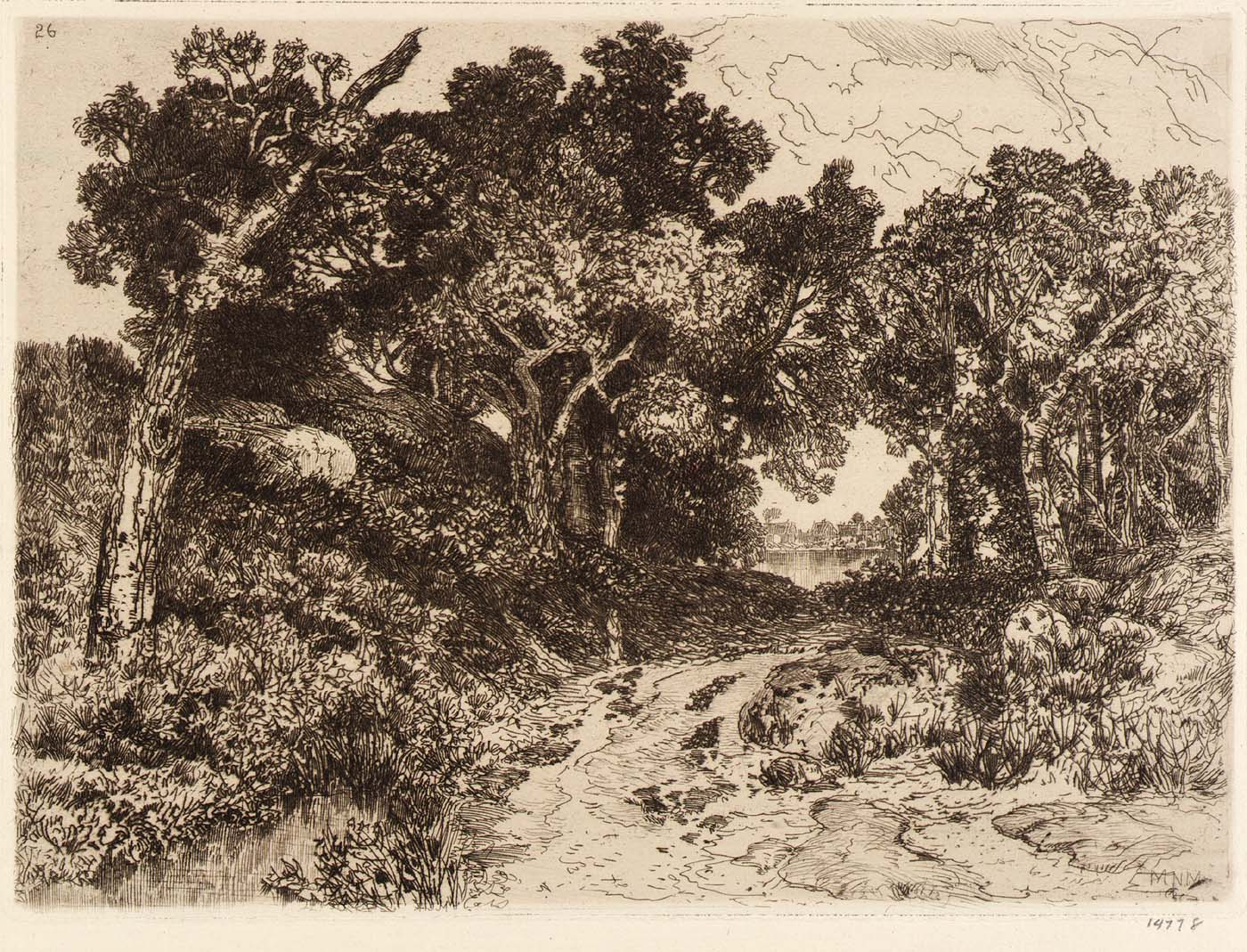
Mary Nimmo Moran, Across The Water, ca. 1880–1890. Etching, 5 7/8 x 8 in. (14.9 x 20.2 cm)

Mary Nimmo was born in Strathaven, Scotland on May 16, 1842 to Mary and Archibald Nimmo, a family of weavers. The town of Strathaven was one of many where hand-loomed and colorful wools from weavers were the main source of livelihood for the community. Following, the death of her mother in 1847, when Mary was five, her father, Archibald, took her and her brother with him to the United States, settling in Crescentville, Philadelphia, Pennsylvania in 1858. In 1860, she began studying art at the Pennsylvania Academy of the Fine Arts with her neighbor Thomas Moran, who was gaining a local reputation as an artist.

In 1862, the couple married and moved to Philadelphia, where they had two daughters and a son together. Their son Paul Nimmo Moran was born in 1864, their first daughter, Mary Scott, was born in 1868, and their second daughter, Ruth Bedford, was born in 1870.

In 1866, the Morans traveled to Europe to study the artworks there. They had a brief stay in England. Then they moved to France and in Paris, they took a studio for nine months near the Luxembourg gardens. She painted the street scenes of Paris and did sketching of the Fontainebleau and the Seine Valley. They then went to Italy and were charmed by the ancient city of Baise. They moved throughout Italy and some of the places they stayed or visited were Rome, Florence, Bologna, and Milan, and sketched Lake Como. They went through St. Gotthard and passed through the Alps and then proceeded back to Paris. In 1872, they moved to Newark, New Jersey. Mary recorded a view of the Hackensack Meadows which was an oil painting. It was created in 1879 and it was called Newark from the Meadows which was one of the earliest depictions of the industrial scene in America.

She took up painting to be a better companion to her husband on many of his sketching trips and worked in both watercolor and oils. In 1879, her husband introduced her to the technique of etching by directly working on a copper plate. Mary's first etching was a Florida landscape, which she created from a memory of a family trip in 1877. She made most of her etchings on location near her various homes, as responsibilities to her growing family strongly limited her travel. Her paintings and etching are directly about nature which can be seen in her artwork. Etching became her favorite type of medium to use. Her etchings earned critical praise for their directness and boldness because they were so different.

The New York Etching Club invited the Morans to submit their artwork for an American presentation at the international exhibition of the newly organized Royal Society of the Painter-Etchers. Mary exhibited four etchings which included: Easthampton, Barnes, L.I.; An Old Homestead at Easthampton; Long Island: Solitude; and Long Island Twilight. She was the only woman among the 65 original fellows.

She was elected to the Society of Painter-Etchers of New York in 1879. In 1881, she was invited along with her husband to become a member of the Royal Society of Painters and Etchers of Great Britain and she was able to exhibit and showcase her work. She was the only woman among the 65 original fellows chosen for London's Royal Society of Painter-Etchers. Her prints were recognized for their boldness and originality and were collected by the British critic John Ruskin among others. She was a frequent exhibitor of the American Society of Painters and Etchers. Mary Nimmo Moran often signed her etchings "M. Nimmo Moran" or "M. N. Moran", leading many people, including the membership committees, to believe she was a male artist. Her etchings earned critical praise for their directness and boldness.

The Moran family relocated to Newark, New Jersey in 1872. In June 1881, they moved to New York City. Mary was able to use the city as an inspiration and capture the transition of the city. In 1882, the Moran family decided to do another trip to England and Scotland. Mary was able to do some artwork there and one of them was Cochrane's O'The Craig-Strathaven, which was an ode to the town she was born. In 1884 they moved to East Hampton, Long Island. This town became the subject of many of Nimmo Moran's most successful etchings. The Moran home in East Hampton became the center of a productive artists' colony and is today designated as a National Historic Landmark. It is also a contributing property to the East Hampton Village District, a historic district listed on the National Register of Historic Places.

Her paintings were exhibited sporadically at the National Academy of Design. It was presented at the Society of American Artists from 1879 to 1899 at the Pennsylvania Academy of the Fine Arts.

Fifty-four of her etchings were presented in a Mammoth Exhibition of Women Printmakers at the Museum of Fine Arts in Boston from November 1 through December 31, 1887.

Nimmo Moran exhibited her work at the Woman's Building at the 1893 World's Columbian Exposition in Chicago, Illinois.

Nimmo Moran was described as simultaneously charming, personable, bright, modest, and humble. Notably, she was well-versed in many different fields of artistry.

In summer 1950, her etchings were presented at the Smithsonian Institution in Washington D.C.

A large number of prints of Moran's etchings belong to the collection of the Gilcrease Museum in Tulsa, Oklahoma.

== Death ==
Moran died of typhoid fever on September 25, 1899, aged 57, after nursing her daughter Ruth through the disease. She was buried beside Goose Pond, a subject of many of her etchings, near her home in East Hampton.

== Auction record ==
On 9 June 2011, Swann Galleries auctioned Mary Nimmo Moran's Long Island Landscape, an 1880 oil on panel, which was her first painting to appear at auction. It sold for $64,800.

== Artworks ==
Name	Date	Medium	Size
Across the Water	ca. 1880–1890	etching	5 7/8 x 8 in. (14.9 x 20.2 cm)
The Bay	ca. 1880–1890	etching	8 x 11 5/8 in. (20.3 x 29.5 cm)
Bridge over the Buskill, Easton, Pa.	1879	etching	7 x 4 in. (17.7 x 10.3 cm)
Cattails and Trees	ca. 1880–1890	etching	4 x 7 in. (10.3 x 17.8 cm)
Cattle in a Pond	1881	etching	5 3/4 x 9 in. (14.8 x 22.7 cm)
The Coast of Florida	1887	etching	3 1/4 x 6 in. (8.3 x 15.1 cm)
Gardiner's Bay, L.I., Seen from Fresh Pond	1884	etching on parchment	7 3/4 x 11 1/2 in. (19.8 x 29.2 cm)
Home of the Muskrat	1884	etching	4 5/8 x 11 3/8 in. (11.7 x 28.9 cm)
House by a Stream	1881	etching	12 x 6 in. (30.5 x 15.2 cm)
Long Island Landscape	1880	oil on panel	19 3/4 x 30 in. (50 x76 cm)
Looking Seaward	1885	etching	11 1/2 x 17 1/2 in. (29.3 x 44.4 cm)
Meadowland	1884	etching	5 x 11 1/2 in. (12.7 x 29.2 cm)
My Neighbor's Home--Easthampton	1883	etching	8 x 11 7/8 in. (20.3 x 30.3 cm)
The Old Homestead	1880	etching on chine collé	7 3/4 x 12 in. (19.7 x 30.4 cm)
Old Lindens--Near Easthampton	1885	etching	8 x 11 7/8 in. (20.2 x 30.2 cm)
Salt Water Ponds	1884	etching	9 3/4 x 11 1/4 in. (24.8 x 28.7 cm)
The Garden Path, Easthampton	1894	oil on artist's board	14 x10 in. (35.7 x 25.5 cm)
The "Home Sweet Home" of John Howard Payne, Easthampton	1885	etching	16 x 13 1/8 in. (40.5 x 33.2 cm)
The Sea through the Woods	ca. 1880–1890	etching	8 x 5 3/4 in. (20.3 x 14.8 cm)
Three Maidens at the River	ca.1880–1890	etching	6 13/16 x 5 3/16 in. (17.3 x 14.7 cm.)
Twilight	ca. 1880–1890	etching, roulette, sandpaper, and scotchstone on paper	3 x 5 1/2 in. (7.8 x 13.8 cm)
A Glimpse of Conway	ca 1882	etching on a copper plate	9 3/8 x 6 1/2 in. (23.8 cm x 16.5 cm)

== Gallery ==
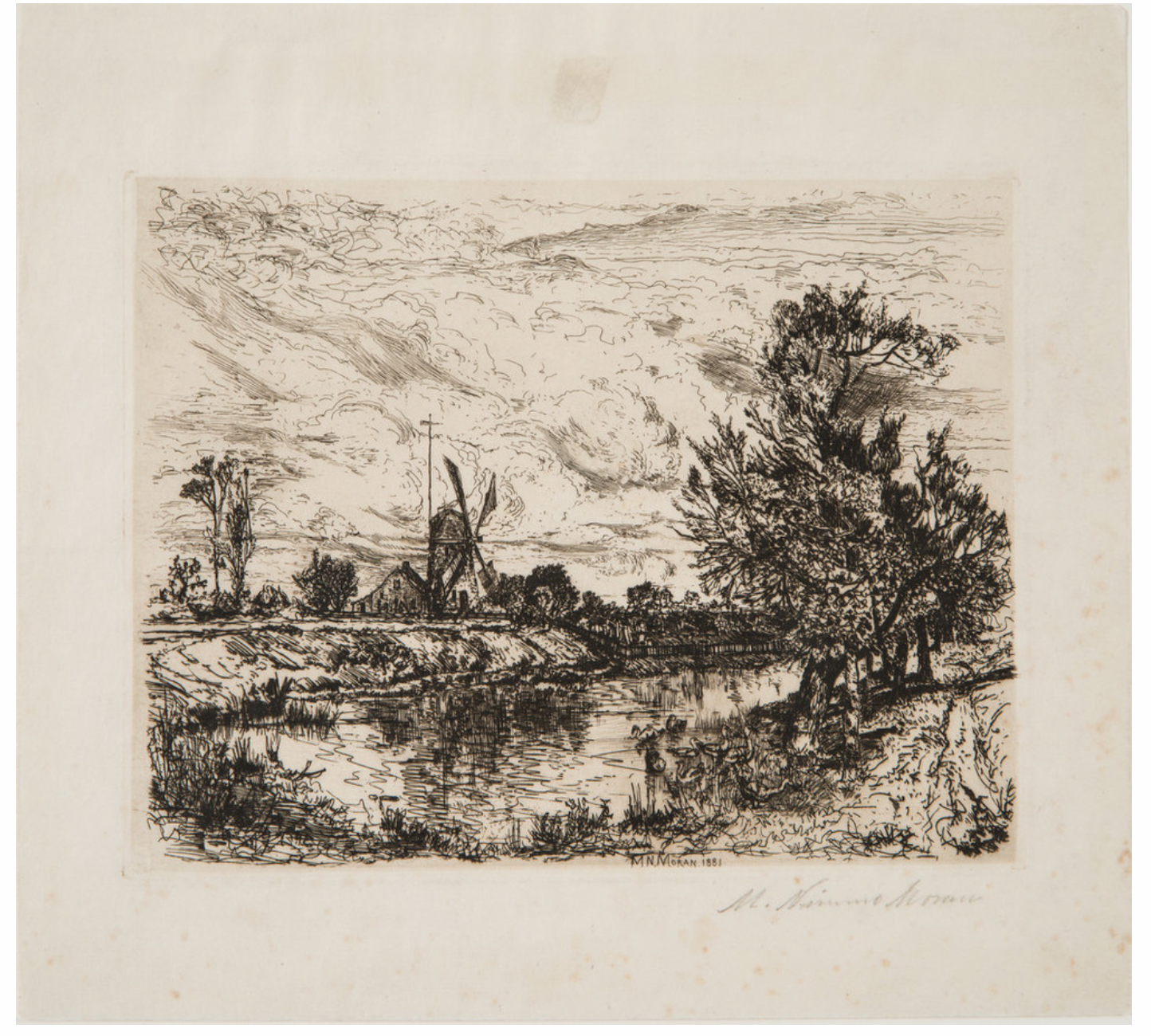
Title: The Goose Pond of East HamptonCreated in 1881

The Goose Pond of East Hampton is an important work of Mary Nimmo Moran because their home in East Hampton overlooked a Goose Pond. It became her inspiration in the flat grassy terrain and abundant waterways. She used the delicate line of the etching needle to describe the pond that cuts the composition in half. She included a Gardiner's Mill which was a typical landmark of 18th-century Dutch etching. The movement of the clouds is something challenging in general when doing etching but she was able to create a special effect in this etching which was something that was not seen and it was different for that period.

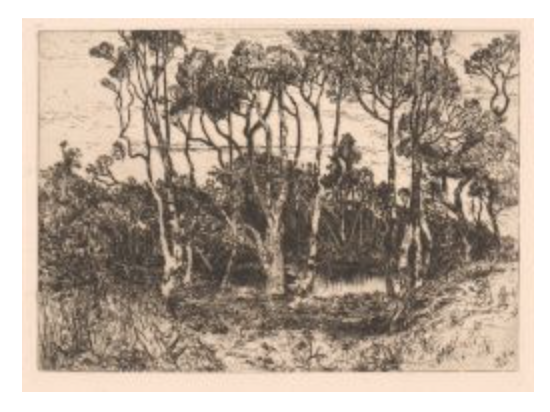
Title: Solitude Created in 1880

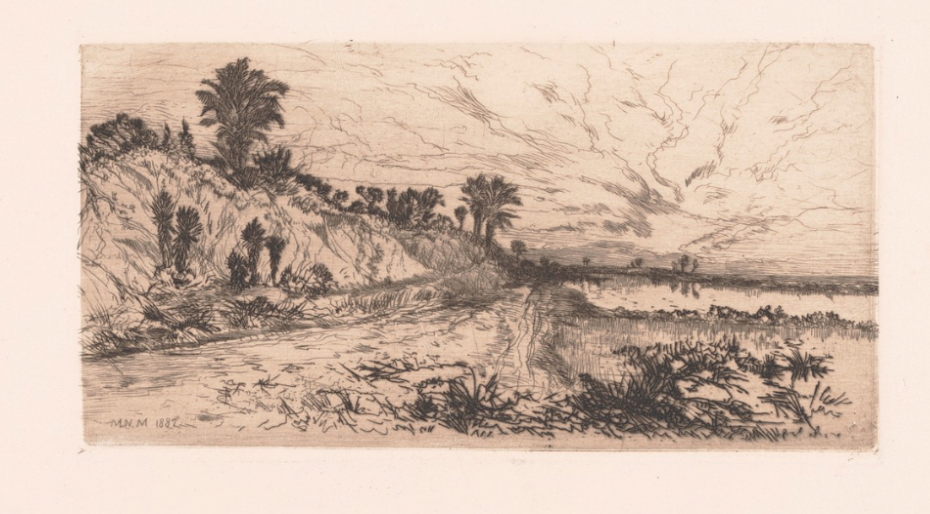
Title: Florida Coast One of her first works

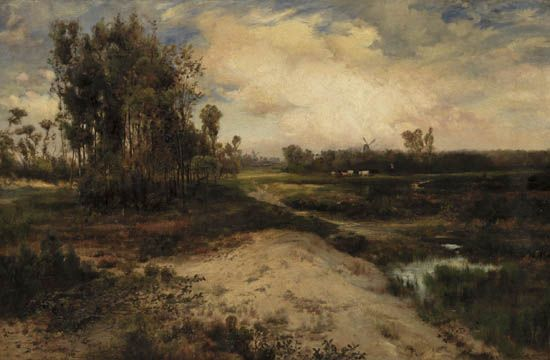
Title: Long Island Landscape Created in 1880

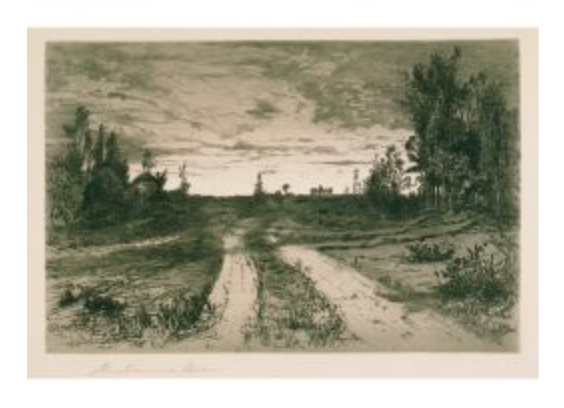
Title: Twilight Easthampton Created in 1880

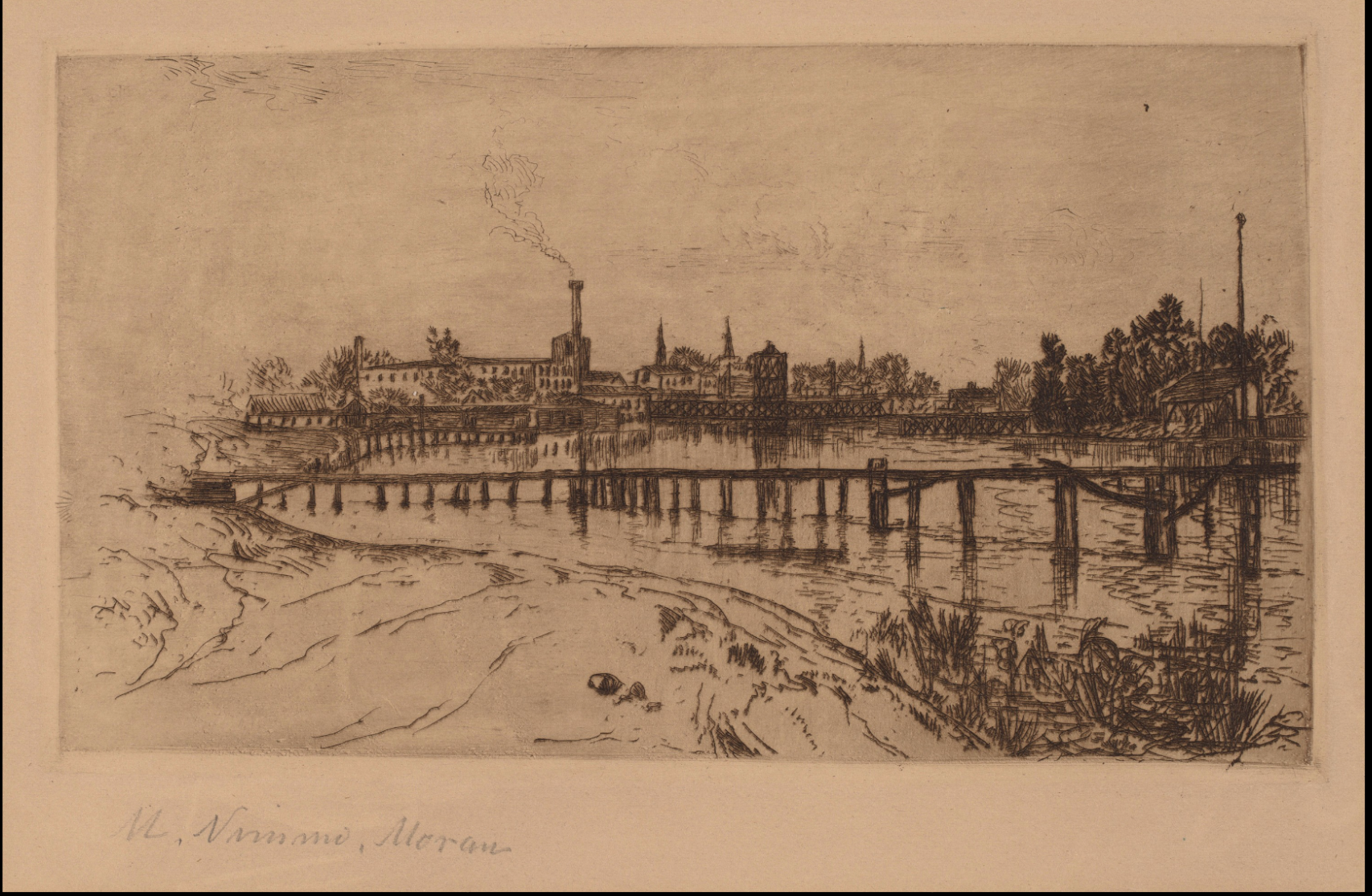
The Passaic at Newark/Newark from the Meadow Created in 1879

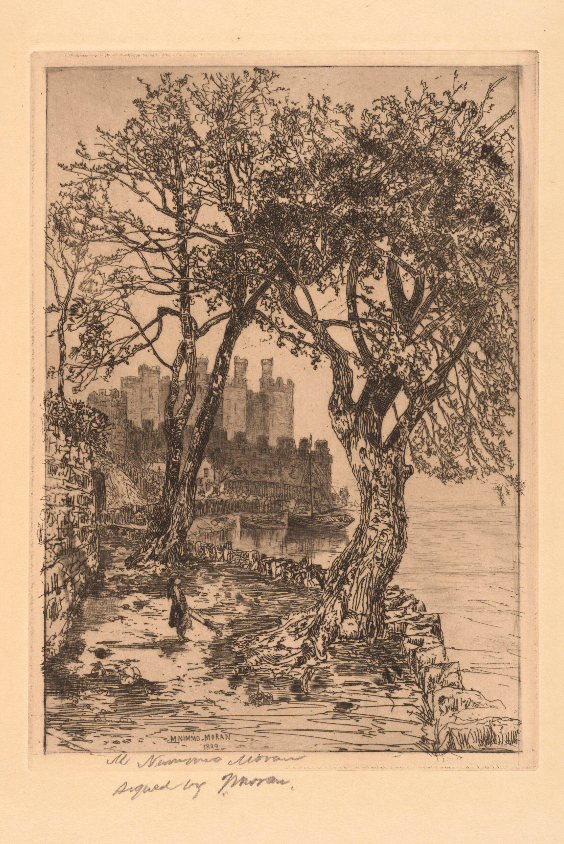
Title: A Glimpse of Conway Created in 1882

A Glimpse of Conway was created during her visit to Europe in 1882 with her husband Thomas Moran. It was etched on a copper plate on-site and outdoors.
