= Thomas Moran =

American artist (1837–1926)

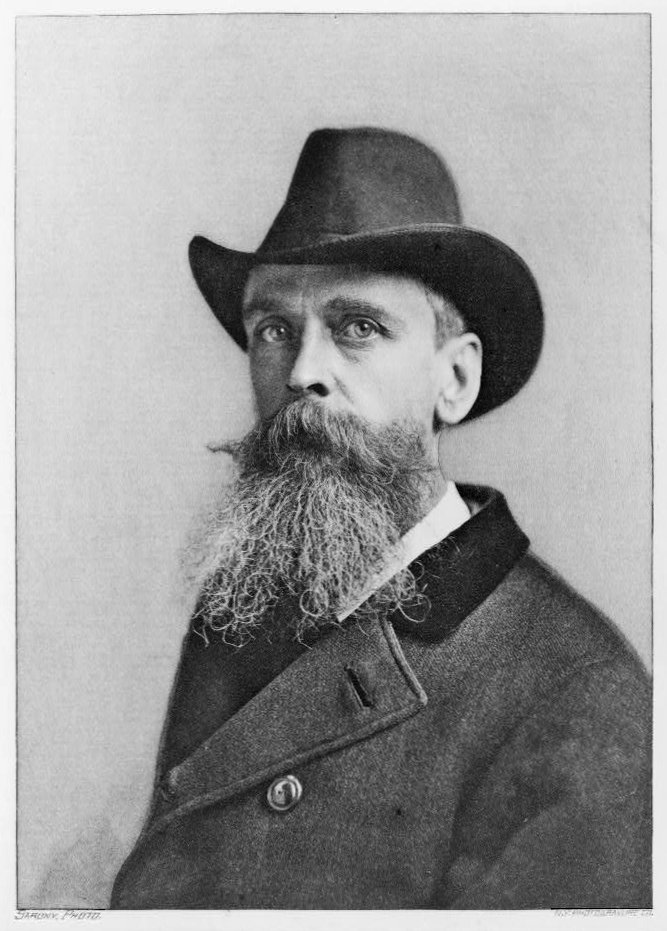
- Thomas Moran by Napoleon Sarony
- Born: February 12, 1837; Bolton, Lancashire, England
- Died: August 25, 1926 (aged 89); Santa Barbara, California, United States
- Known for: Landscape painting
- Movement: Hudson River School, Rocky Mountain School
- Spouse: Mary Nimmo Moran

Thomas Moran (February 12, 1837 – August 25, 1926) was an American painter and printmaker of the Hudson River School in New York whose work often featured the Rocky Mountains. Moran and his family, wife Mary Nimmo Moran and daughter Ruth, took residence in New York where he obtained work as an artist. He was a younger brother of the noted marine artist Edward Moran, with whom he shared a studio.

A talented illustrator and exquisite colorist, Thomas Moran was hired as an illustrator at Scribner's Monthly. During the late 1860s, he was appointed the chief illustrator for the magazine, a position that helped him launch his career as one of the premier painters of the American landscape, in particular, the American West.

Moran along with Albert Bierstadt, Thomas Hill, and William Keith are sometimes referred to as belonging to the Rocky Mountain School of landscape painters because of all of the Western landscapes made by this group.

== Biography ==
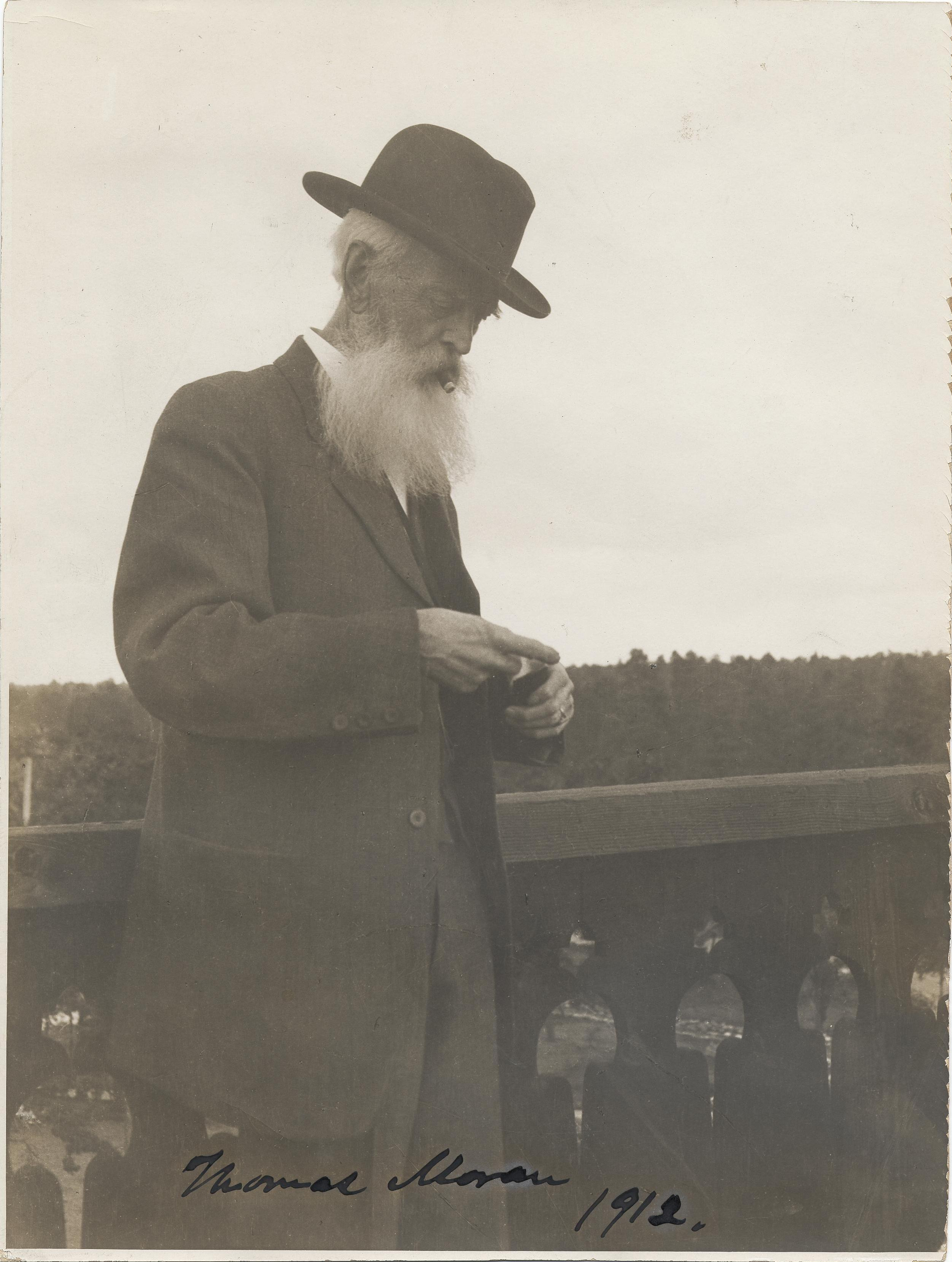
Thomas Moran standing on a balcony, smoking a cigar, 1912

Moran was born in Bolton, Lancashire, in England, to Mary (née Higson) and Thomas Moran Sr., one of seven children. His father belonged to a family of handloom weavers. He wanted a better future for his family, so they moved to the United States in 1844, when young Thomas was 7 years old. The trip had a life-long impression on Moran, who later created sketches and paintings of the sea. His family first settled in Baltimore, moving afterwards to Kensington, a suburb of Philadelphia.

Moran began his artistic career as a teenage apprentice to the Philadelphia wood-engraving firm Scattergood & Telfer. Moran found the engraving process "tedious" and spent his free time working on his own watercolors. By the mid-1850s, he was drawing the firm's illustrations for publication rather than carving them. It was then that he encountered illustrated books that included examples of the work of British artist J. M. W. Turner, who was to be a lasting influence on Moran's work. He also began studying with local painter James Hamilton. Moran traveled to England in 1862 to see Turner's work. From that point on, he emulated Turner's use of color, his choice of landscapes, and was inspired by his explorations in watercolor, a medium for which Turner was particularly well-known.

During the 1870s and 1880s, Moran's designs for wood-engraved illustrations appeared in major magazines and gift oriented publications. Although he mastered multiple printing media including wood-engraving, etching, and lithography, which he learned from his brothers, he received renown for his paintings in oil and in watercolor. The height of his career coincided with the popularity of chromolithography, which Moran used to make color prints of his works, so that they could be widely distributed. He was also one of the leaders of the etching revival in the United States and Great Britain.

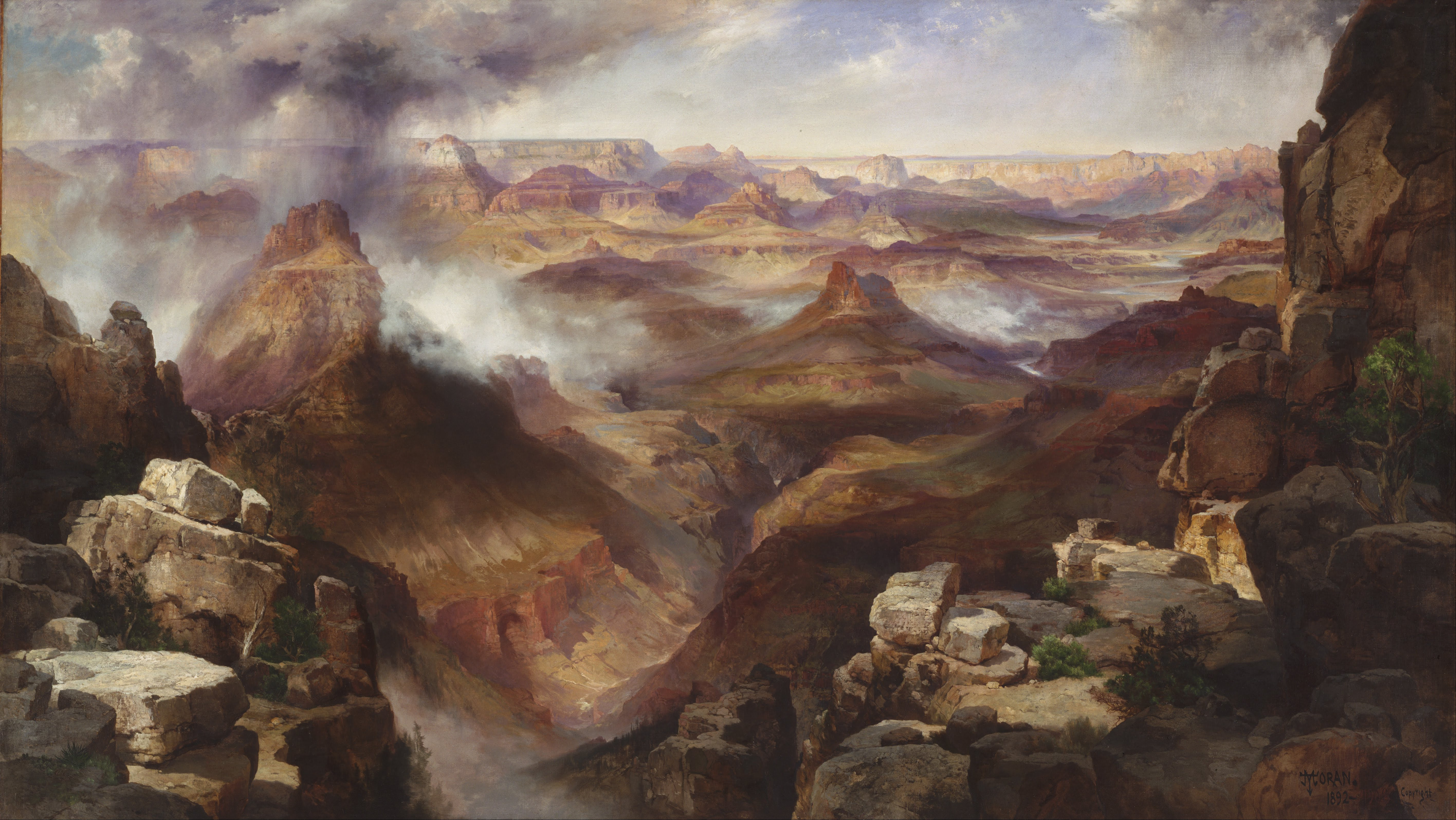
Grand Canyon of the Colorado River (1892–1908)

Moran was married to Scottish born Mary Nimmo Moran (1842–1899), an etcher and landscape painter. The couple had two daughters and a son. His brothers Edward (1829–1901), John (1831–1902) and Peter (1841–1914), as well as his nephews Edward Percy Moran (1862–1935) and Jean Leon Gerome Ferris (1863–1930) were also active as artists. His brother John was also a pioneer in artistic photography. The two often worked side by side, John photographing the same scene that Thomas was painting. He died in Santa Barbara, California on August 25, 1926.

== Yellowstone images ==
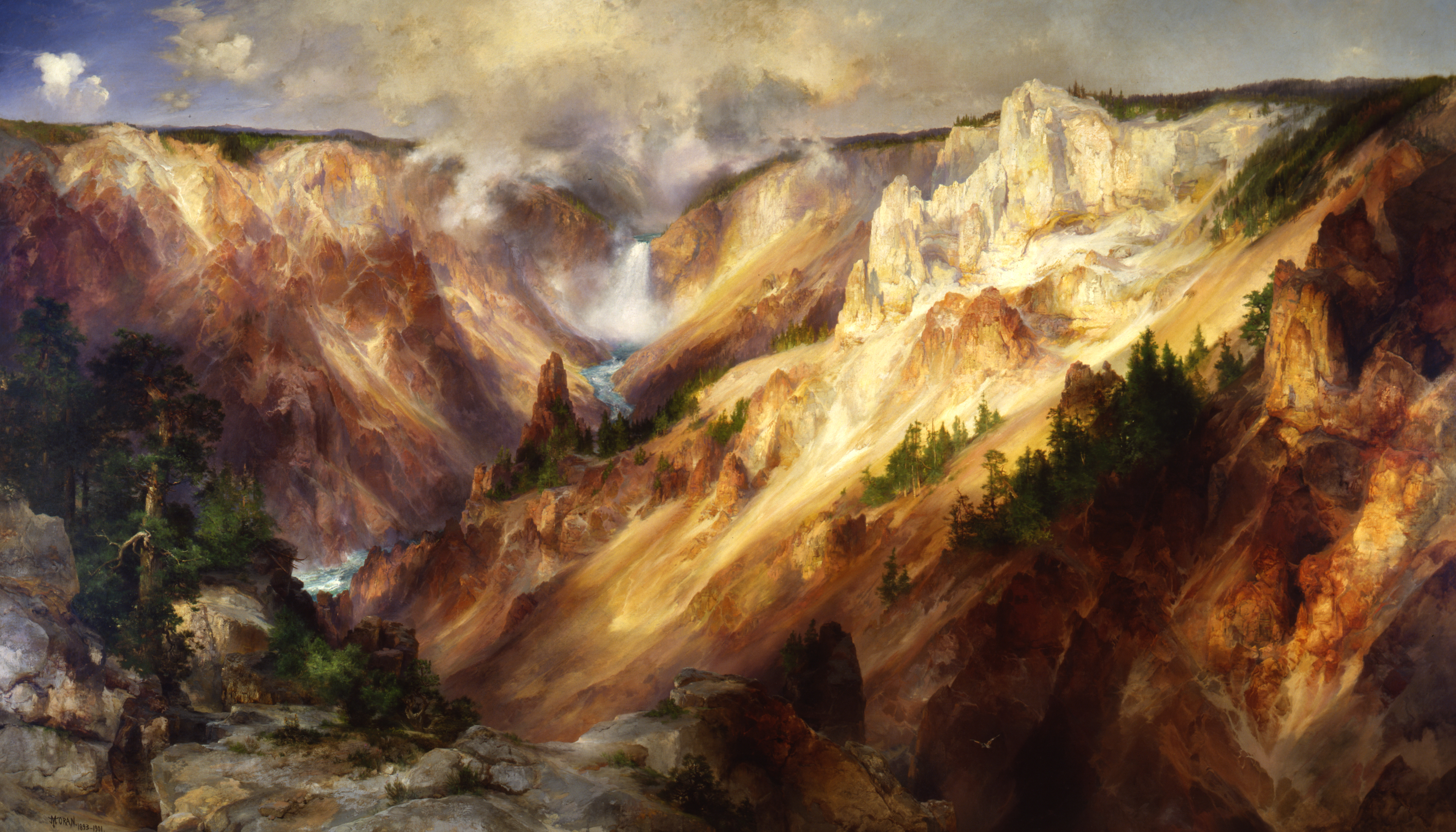
The Grand Canyon of the Yellowstone (1893–1901), Smithsonian American Art Museum

Thomas Moran's vision of the Western landscape was critical to the creation of Yellowstone National Park. In 1871, Ferdinand Vandeever Hayden, director of the United States Geological Survey, invited Moran, at the request of American financier Jay Cooke, to join Hayden and his expedition team into the unknown Yellowstone region. Hayden was just about to embark on his arduous journey when he received a letter from Cooke presenting Moran as "an artist of Philadelphia of rare genius". Funded by Cooke (the director of the Northern Pacific Railroad), and Scribner's Monthly, a new illustrated magazine, Moran agreed to join the survey team of the Hayden Geological Survey of 1871 in their exploration of the Yellowstone region. During forty days in the wilderness area, Moran visually documented over 30 different sites and produced a diary of the expedition's progress and daily activities. His sketches, along with photographs produced by survey member William Henry Jackson, captured the nation's attention and helped inspire Congress to establish the Yellowstone region as the first national park in 1872.

Moran's paintings along with Jackson's photographs revealed the scale and splendor of the beautiful Yellowstone region where written or oral descriptions failed, persuading President Grant and the US Congress that Yellowstone was to be preserved. Moran's impact on Yellowstone was great, but Yellowstone had a significant influence on the artist, too. His first national recognition as an artist, as well as his first large financial success, resulted from his connection with Yellowstone. He even adopted a new signature: T-Y-M, Thomas "Yellowstone" Moran. Just one year after his introduction to the area, Moran captured the imagination of the American public with his first enormous painting of a far-western natural wonder, The Grand Canyon of the Yellowstone, which the government purchased in 1872 for $10,000. For the next two decades, he published his work in various periodicals and created hundreds of large paintings. Among these, The Grand Canyon of the Yellowstone (1872) and Chasm of the Colorado (1873–74) are exhibited at the Department of the Interior Museum.

Over the next forty years Moran traveled extensively. He went back to Yellowstone with Jackson in 1892. They were invited by Elwood Mead, the state engineer of Wyoming, in preparation for a "Wyoming Exhibition" at the World's Columbian Exposition. Thousands of tourists were now able to visit the park, arriving by the Northern Pacific Railway, and Moran and Jackson were able to take advantage of the tourist facilities, such as a hotel at Mammoth Hot Springs. Moran wrote "After a day at Norris we left for the Grand Canyon where we stayed two days and made a great many photos. I saw so much to sketch that I have determined to return there myself after I have been to the Geyser Basins and the lake and spend a week at work there. It is as glorious in color as ever and I was completely carried away by its magnificence. I think I can paint a better picture of it than the old one after I have made my sketches." Moran sketched many more images of the Canyon on this trip than he had in 1871, including views from the viewpoint named for him on the 1871 trip, "Moran Point". The Grand Canyon of the Yellowstone (1893–1901) is on view at the Smithsonian American Art Museum.

Moran was an honorary artist member of the Salmagundi Club New York beginning in 1888, and served as its 4th president, from 1893 to 1896. He was elected to the membership of the National Academy of Design in 1884 and produced numerous works of art in his senior years.

== Painting in the White House ==
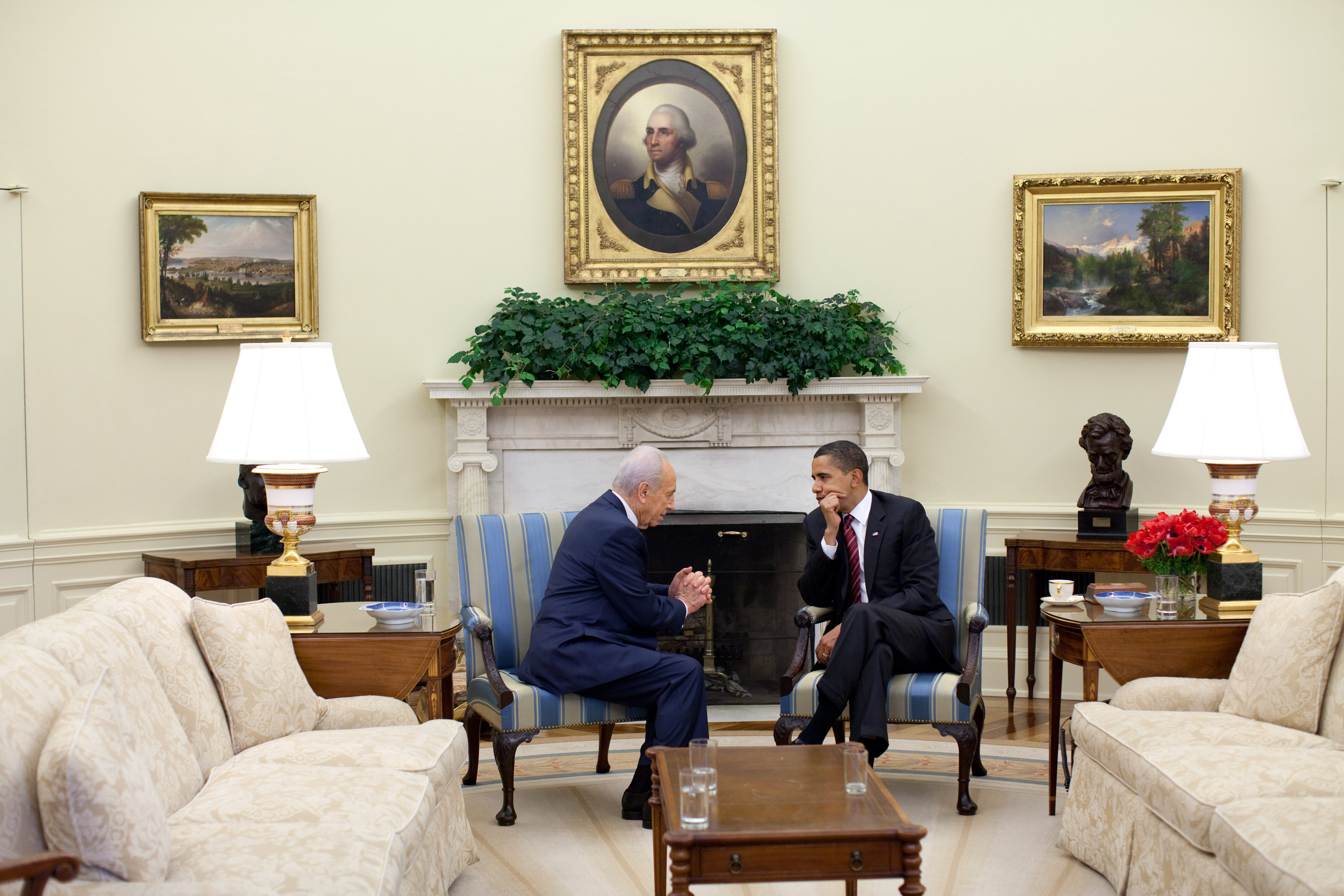
The Three Tetons, 1895, by Thomas Moran (right), in the Oval Office during Barack Obama's term

Thomas Moran has a painting exhibited as part of the White House collection. In the photograph depicting President Barack Obama and Israeli President Shimon Peres in the Oval Office it is seen on the wall: the portrait of George Washington is between City of Washington from Beyond the Navy Yard (1833) by George Cooke (on the left) and The Three Tetons (1895) by Thomas Moran (on the right). Official White House photo by Pete Souza.

== Legacy ==
The Thomas Moran House in East Hampton, New York is a National Historic Landmark. Mount Moran in the Grand Teton National Park is named for Moran. His work is held in the collection of the Gilcrease Museum in Tulsa, Oklahoma, Cooper-Hewitt, National Design Museum, the Amon Carter Museum of American Art, R. W. Norton Art Gallery, and the Berkshire Museum in Pittsfield, Massachusetts.

== Selected works ==
- Nearing Camp, Evening on the Upper Colorado River, Wyoming, 1882. Bolton Museum, UK
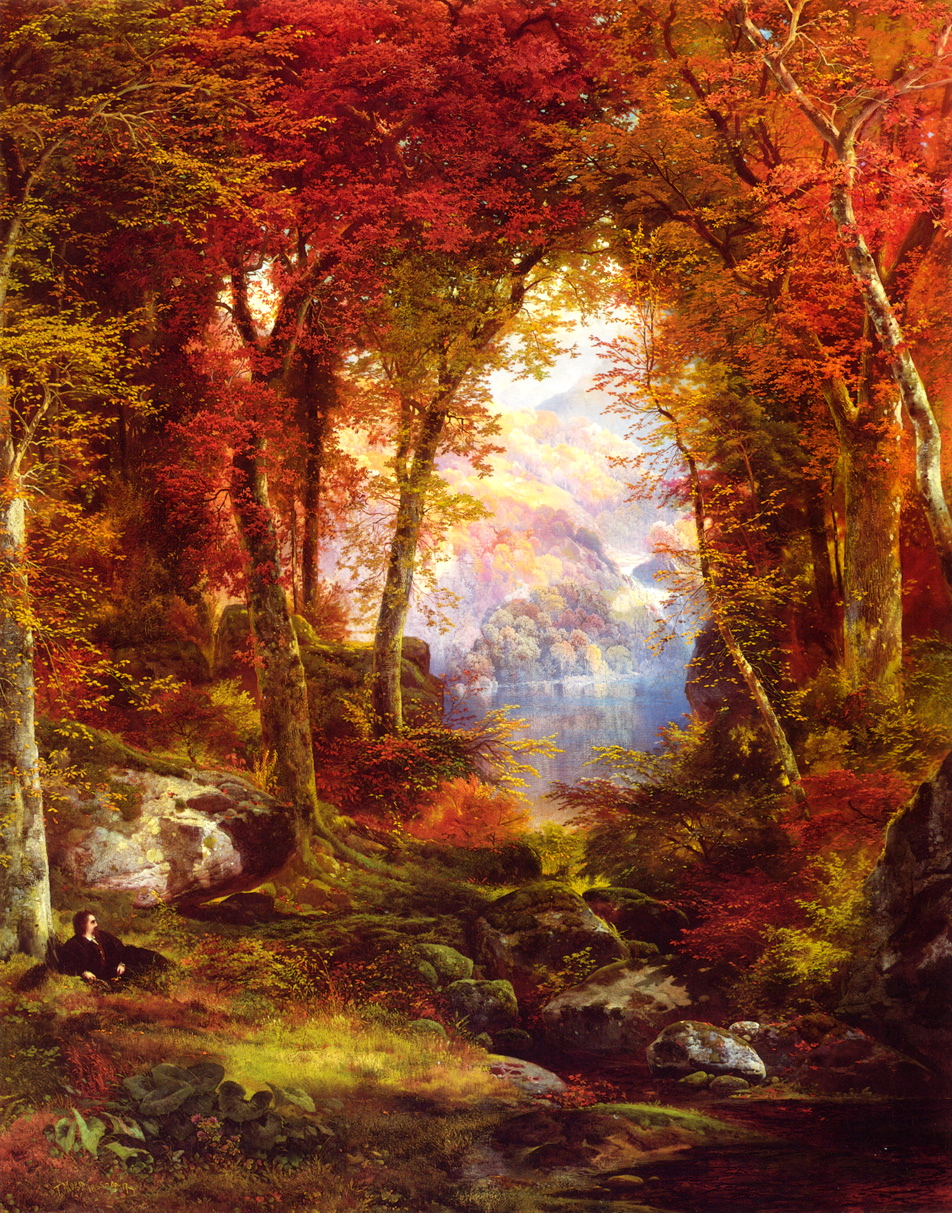
Under the Trees, 1865

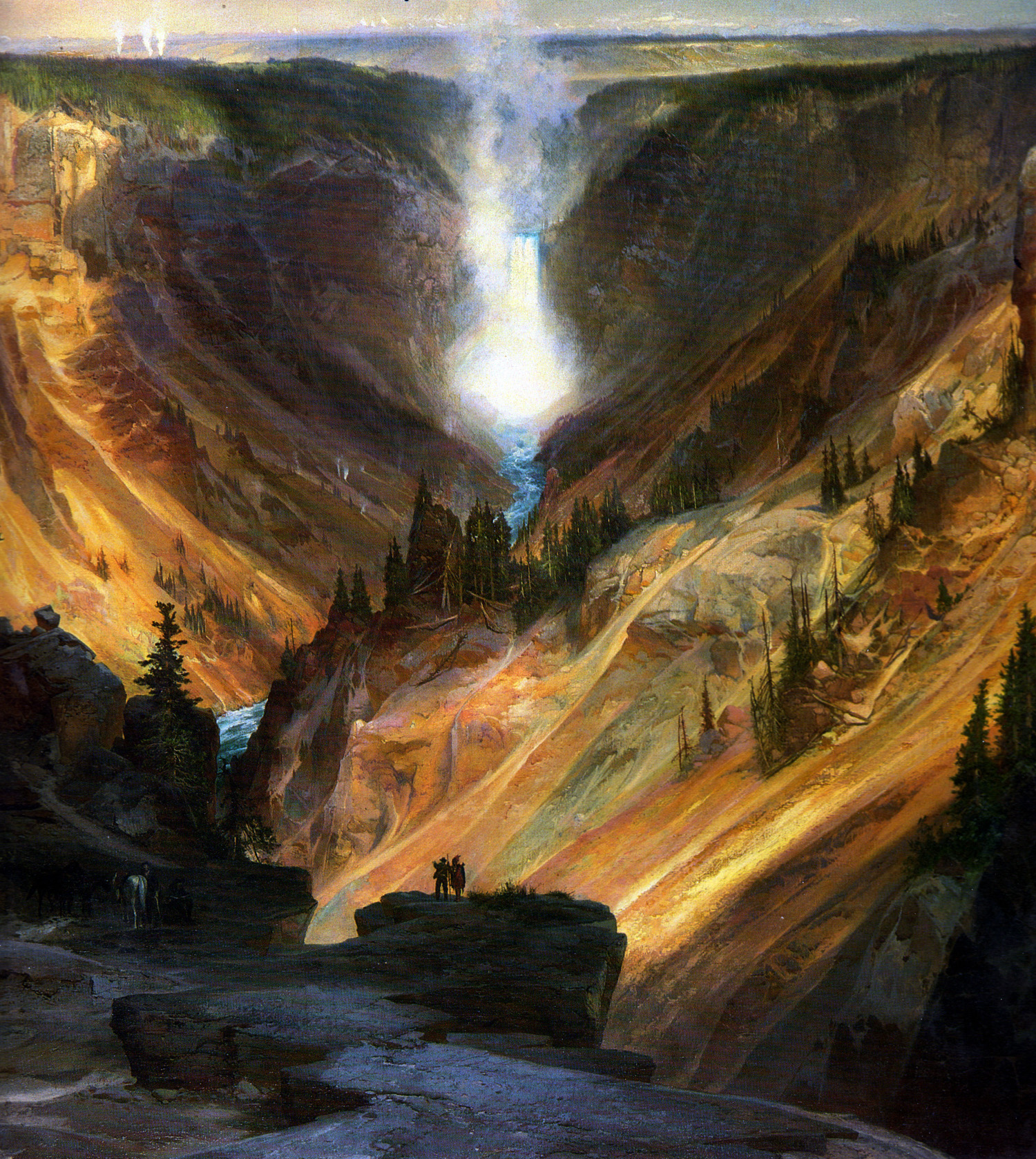
Yellowstone Canyon, 1872

Colburn's Butte, South Utah, 1873, Metropolitan Museum of Art.

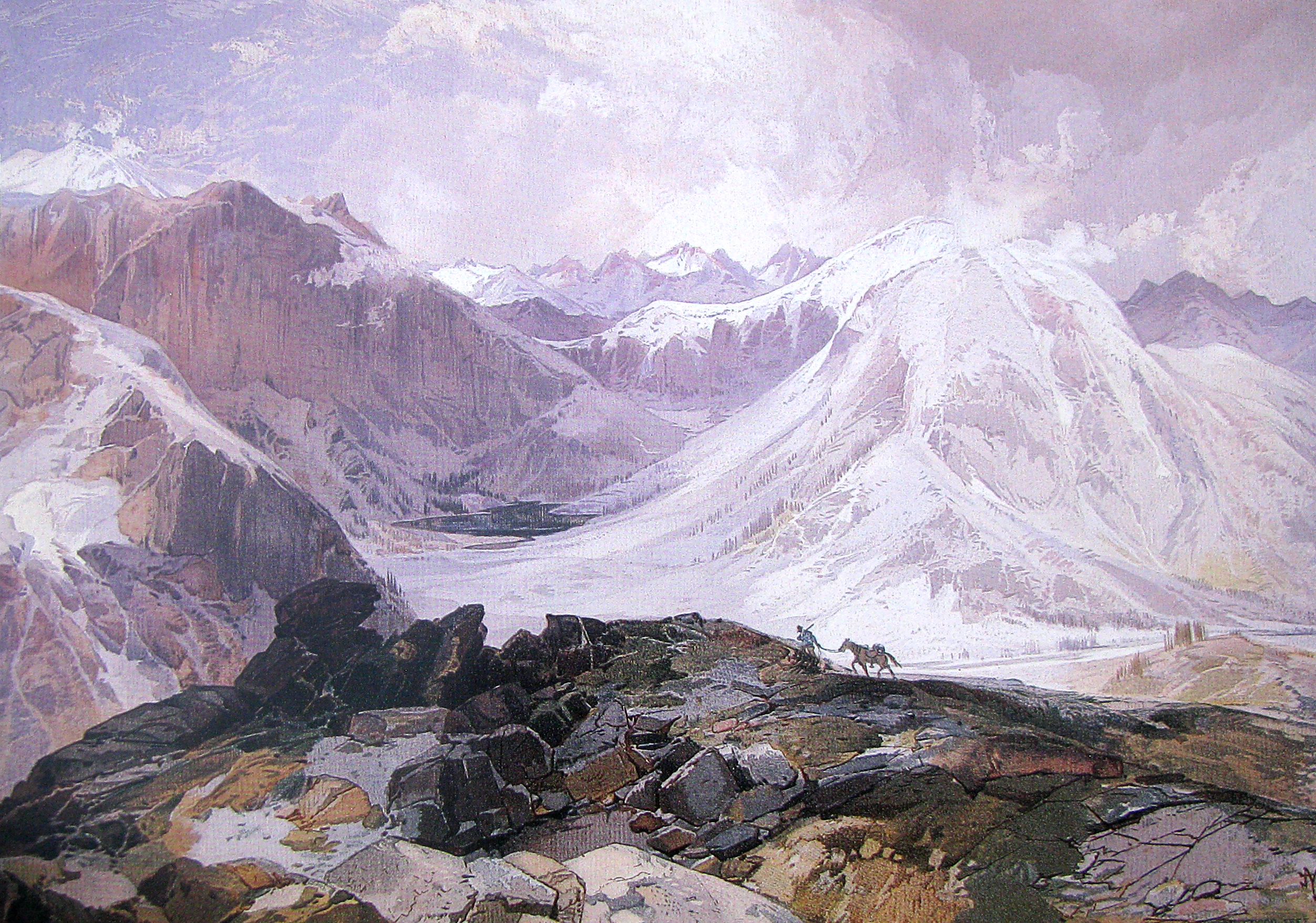
Mosquito Trail, 1874

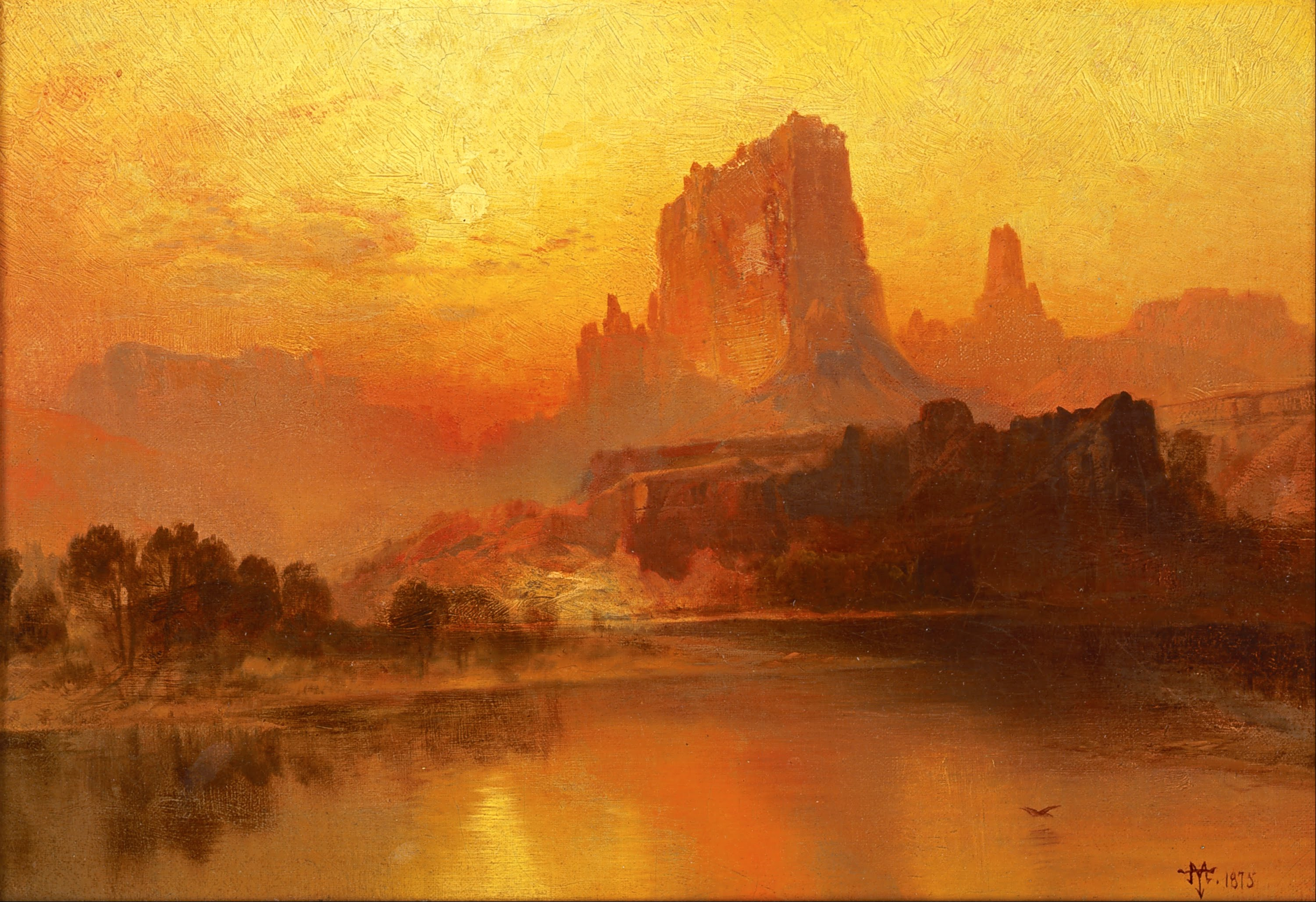
The Golden Hour, 1875

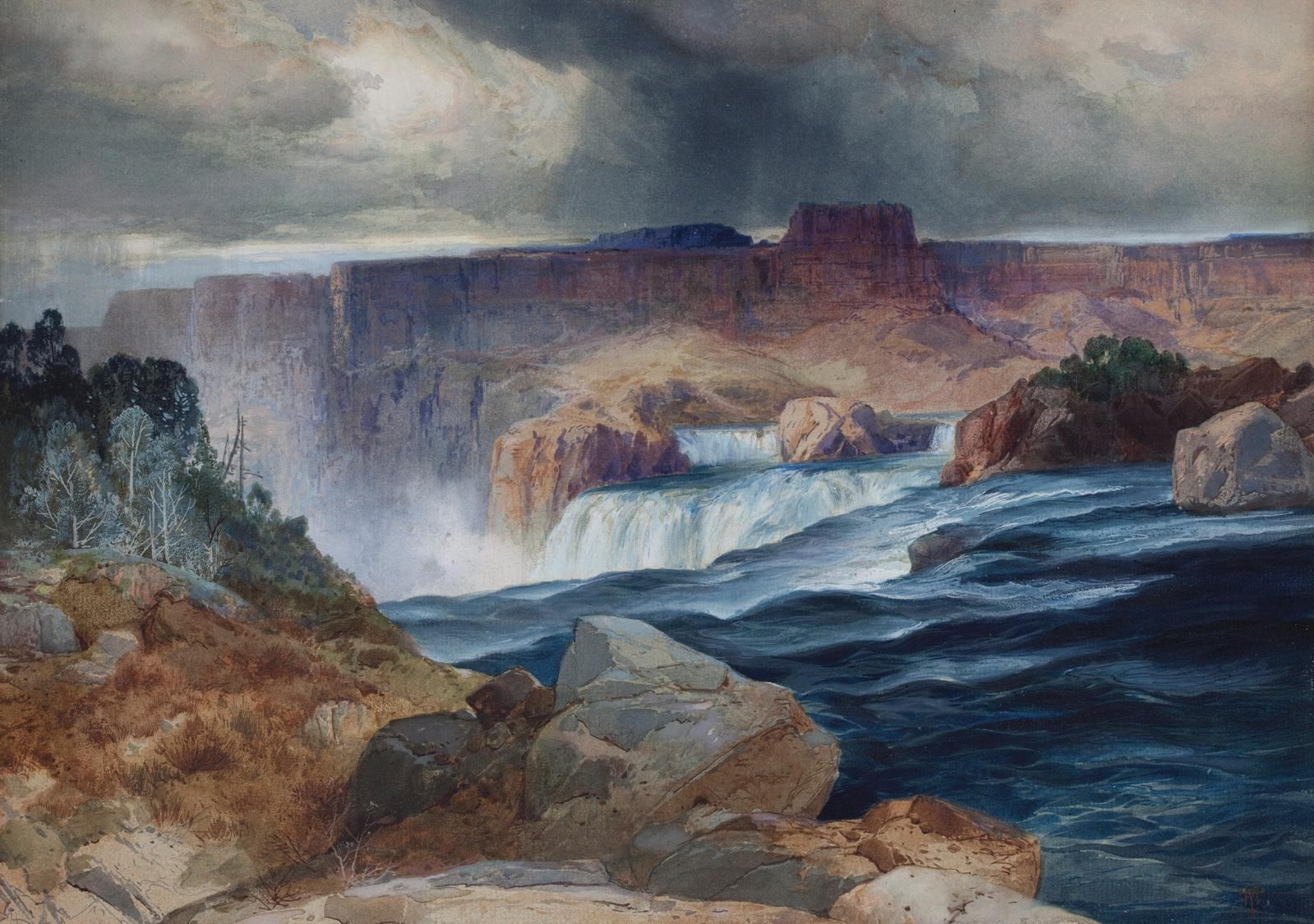
Shoshone Falls, Idaho, ca. 1875

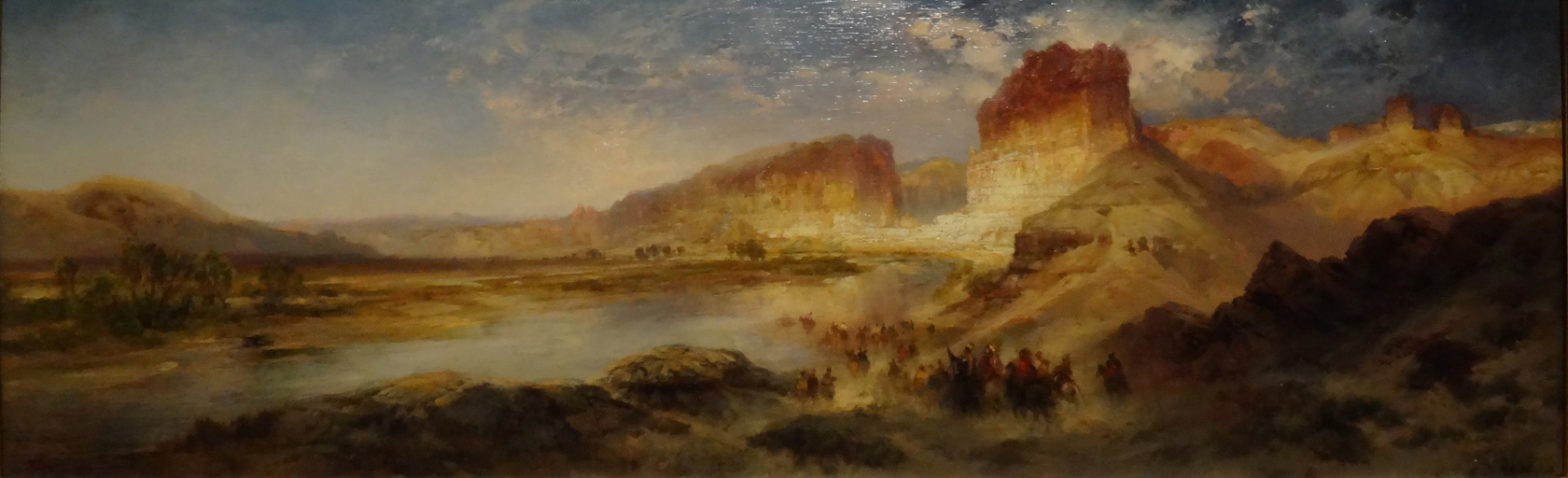
Green River, Wyoming (1878), Crystal Bridges Museum of American Art.

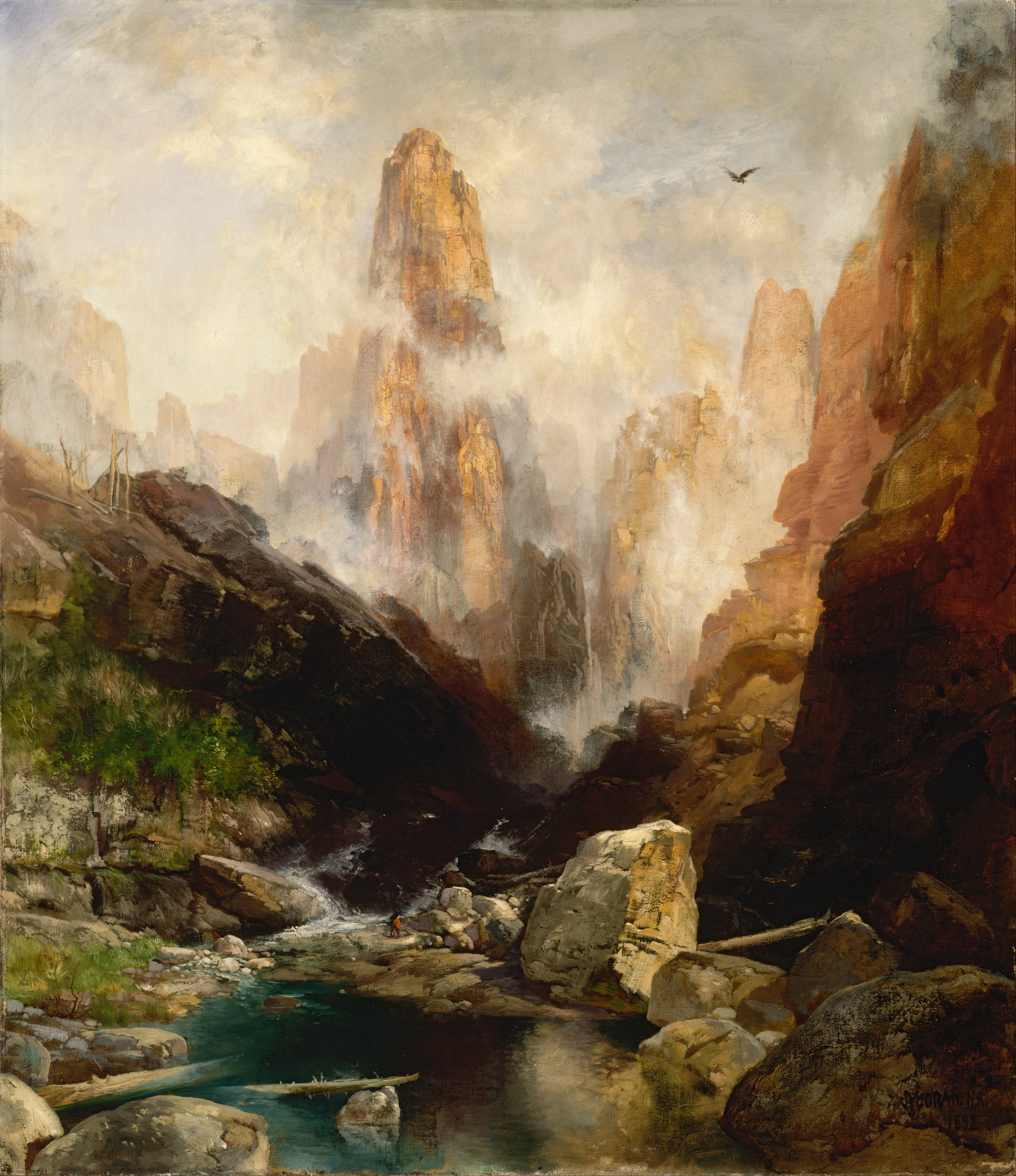
Mist in Kanab Canyon, Utah, 1892

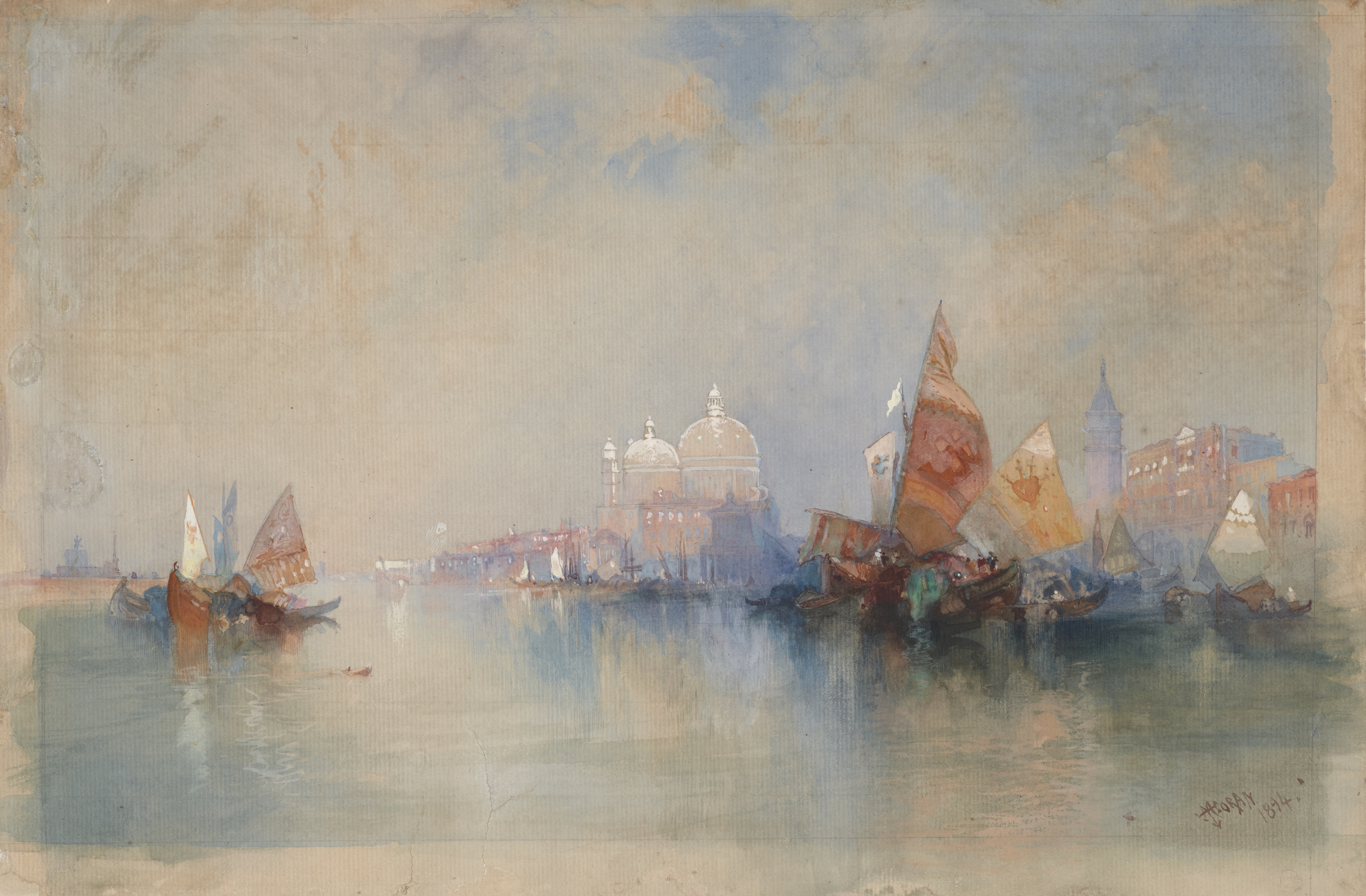
Venice: The Lagoon Looking toward Santa Maria della Salute, 1894, Princeton University Art Museum

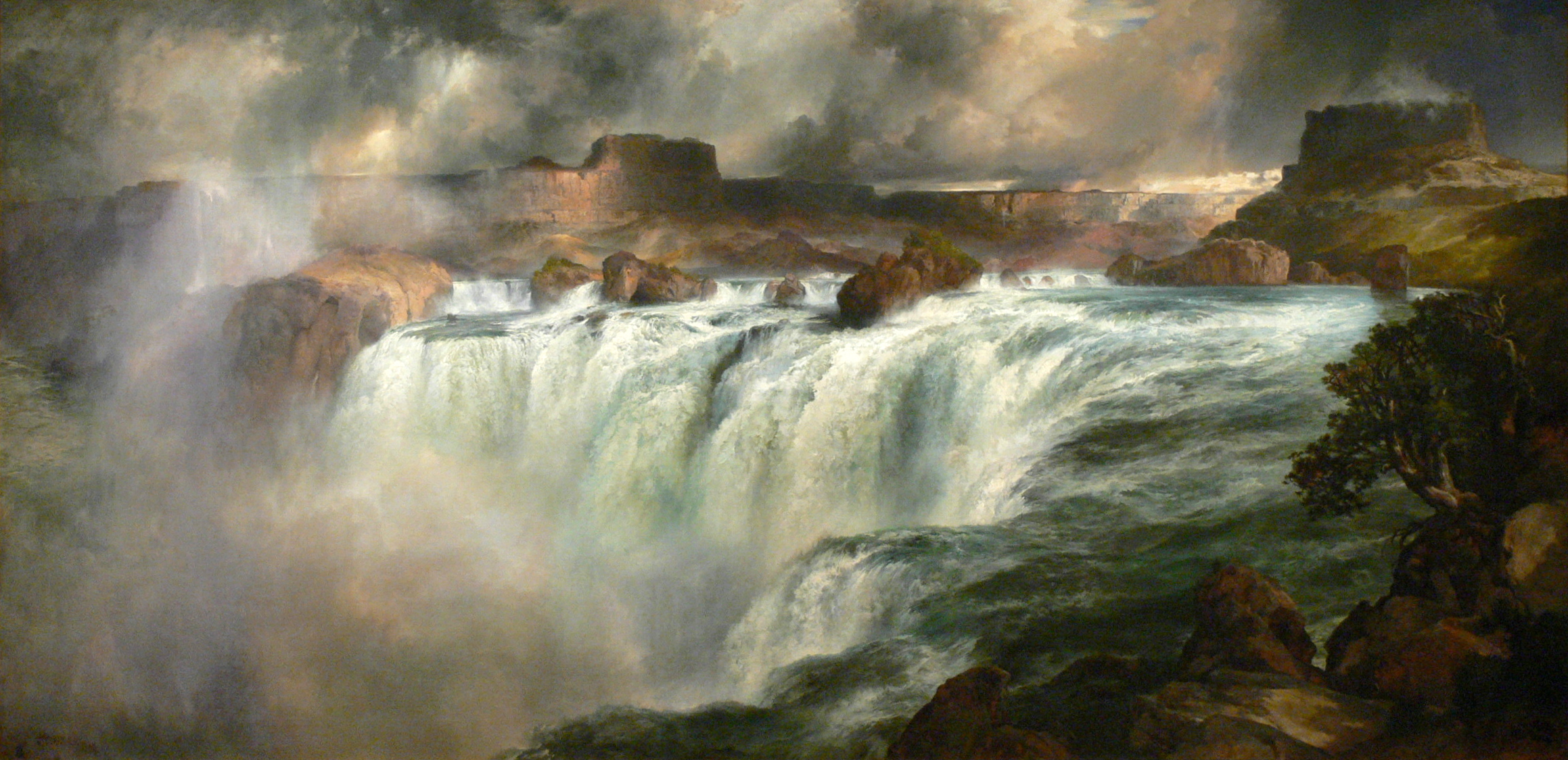
Shoshone Falls on the Snake River (1900), Gilcrease Museum, Tulsa, OK.

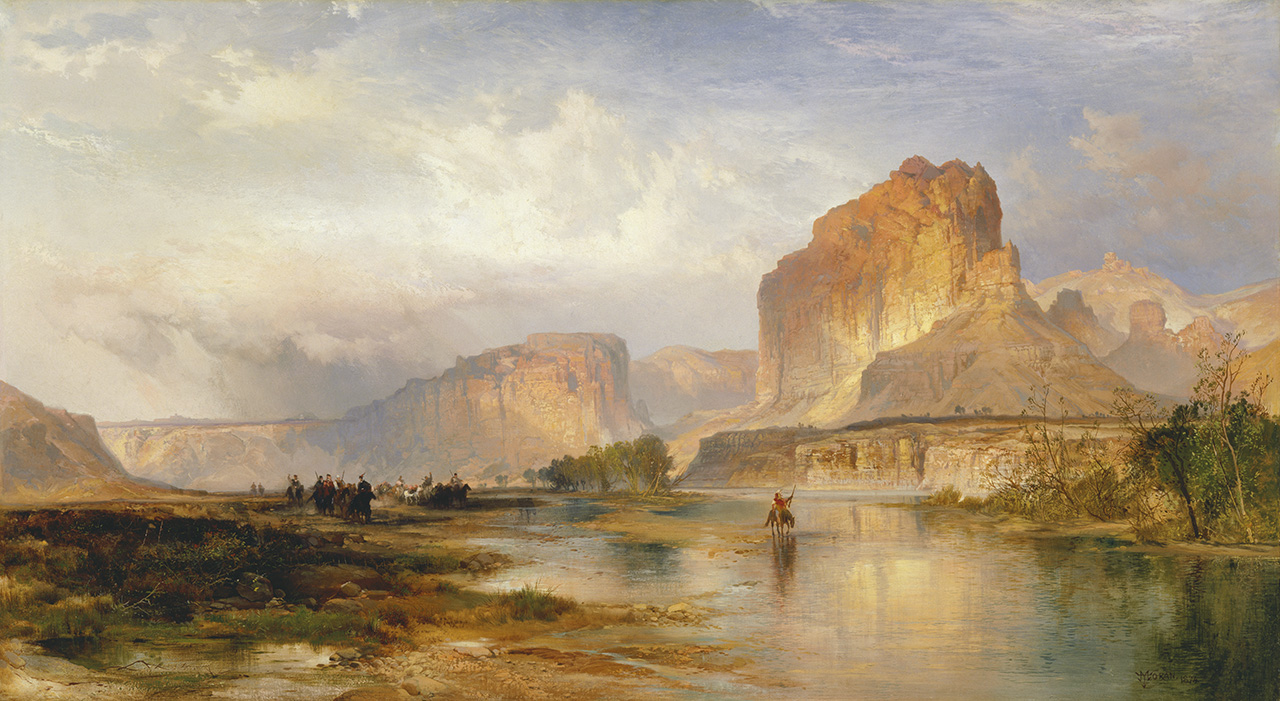
Thomas Moran, Cliffs of Green River, 1874, Amon Carter Museum of American Art

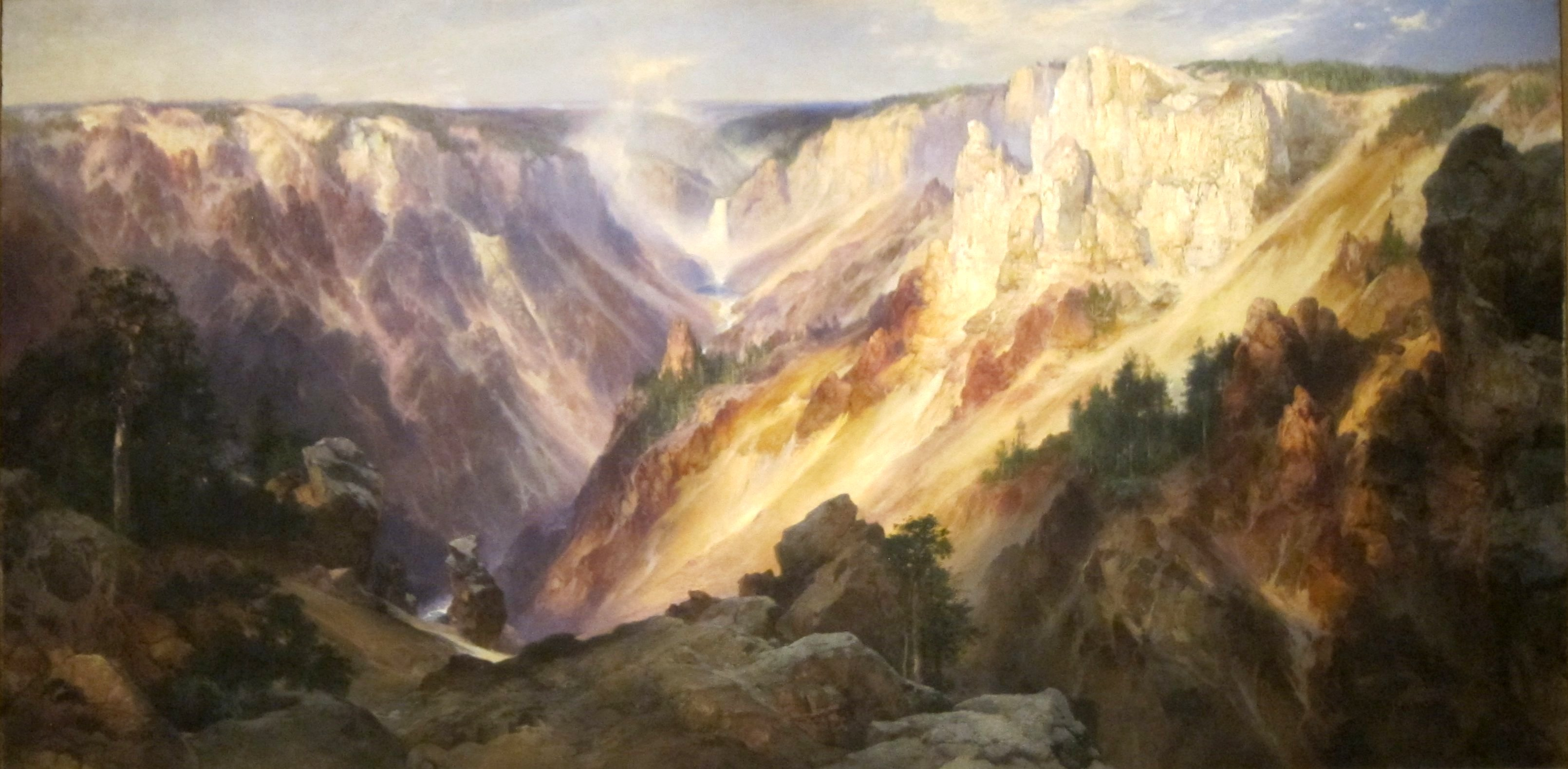
Grand Canyon of Yellow Stone (1904), Honolulu Museum of Art.

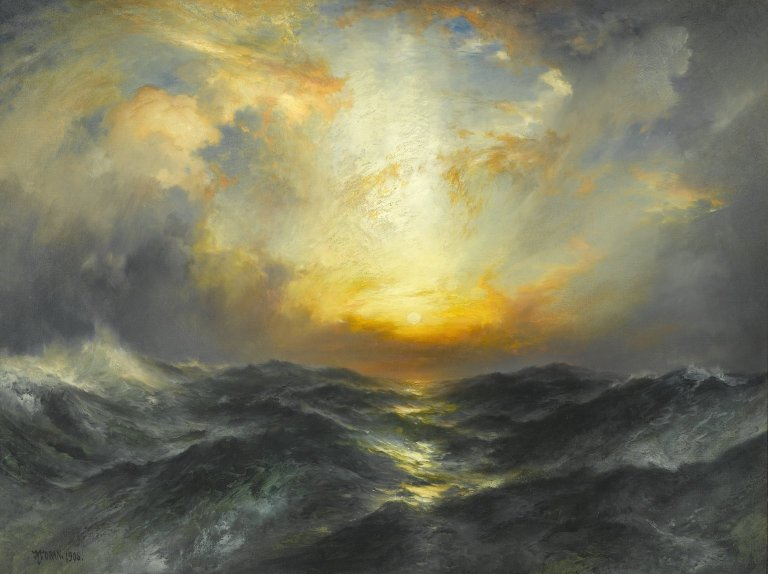
Sunset at Sea , ca. 1906

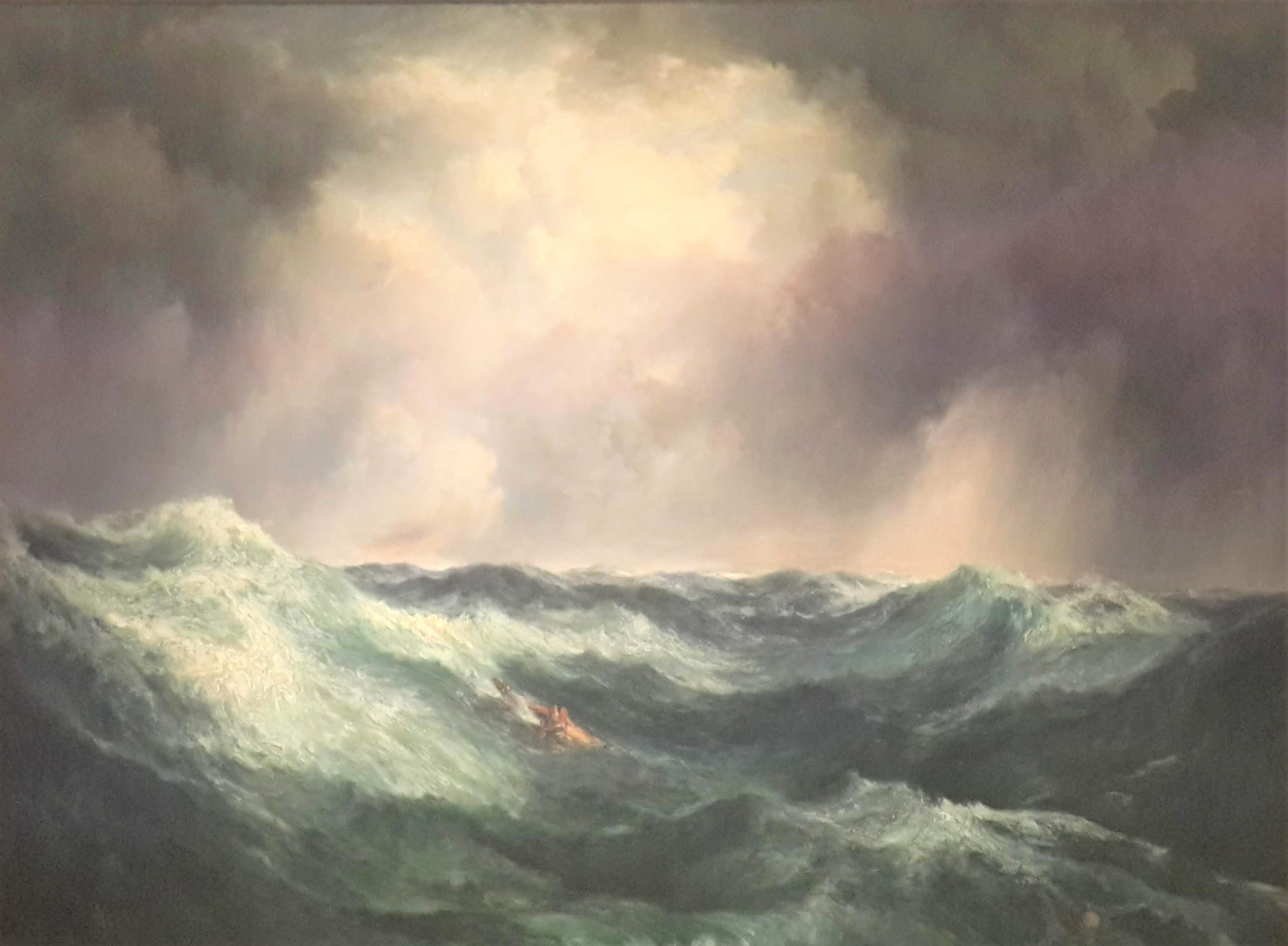
An angry sea (1887), Philbrook Museum, Tulsa OK

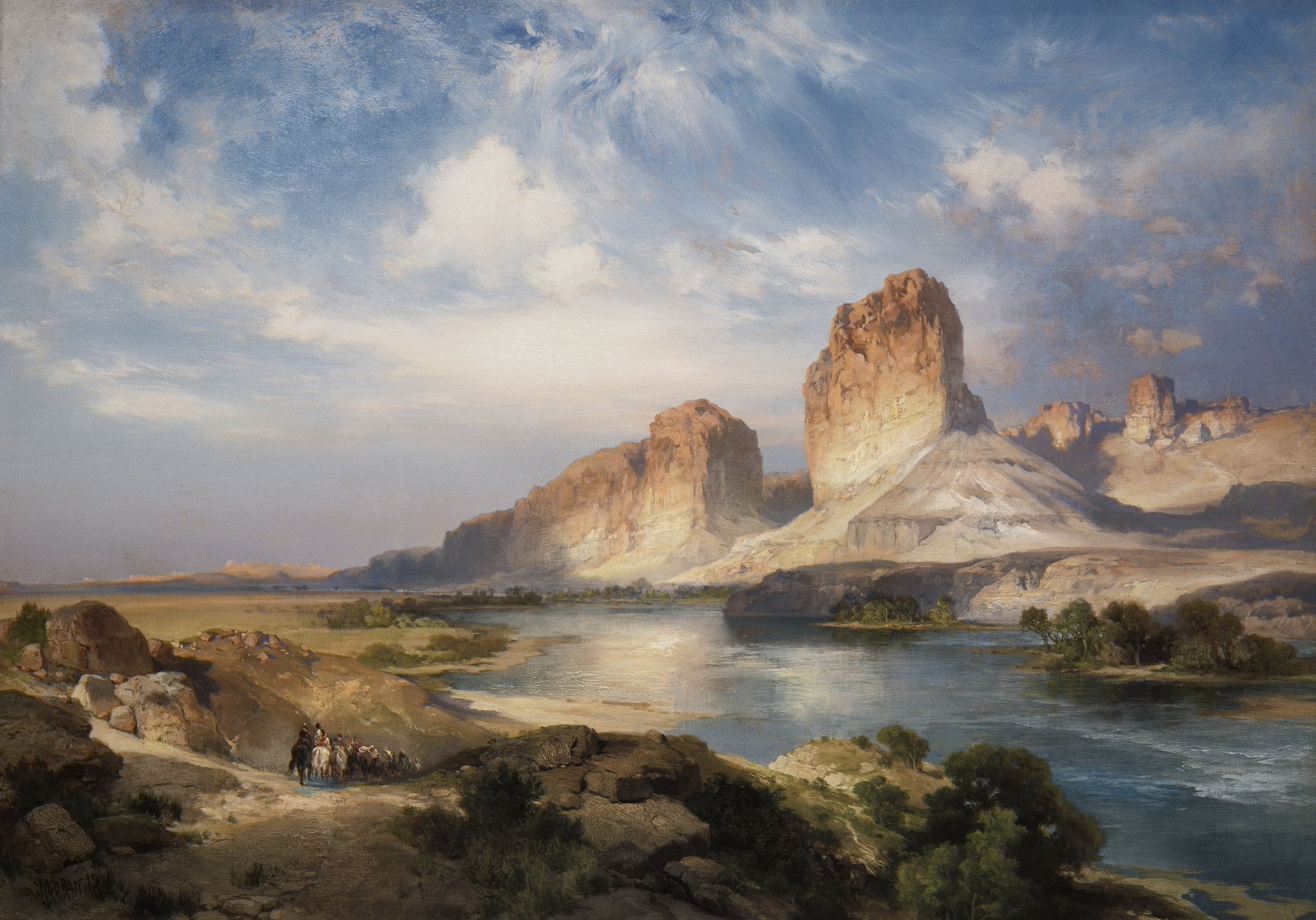
Green River, Wyoming (1907), Tacoma Art Museum

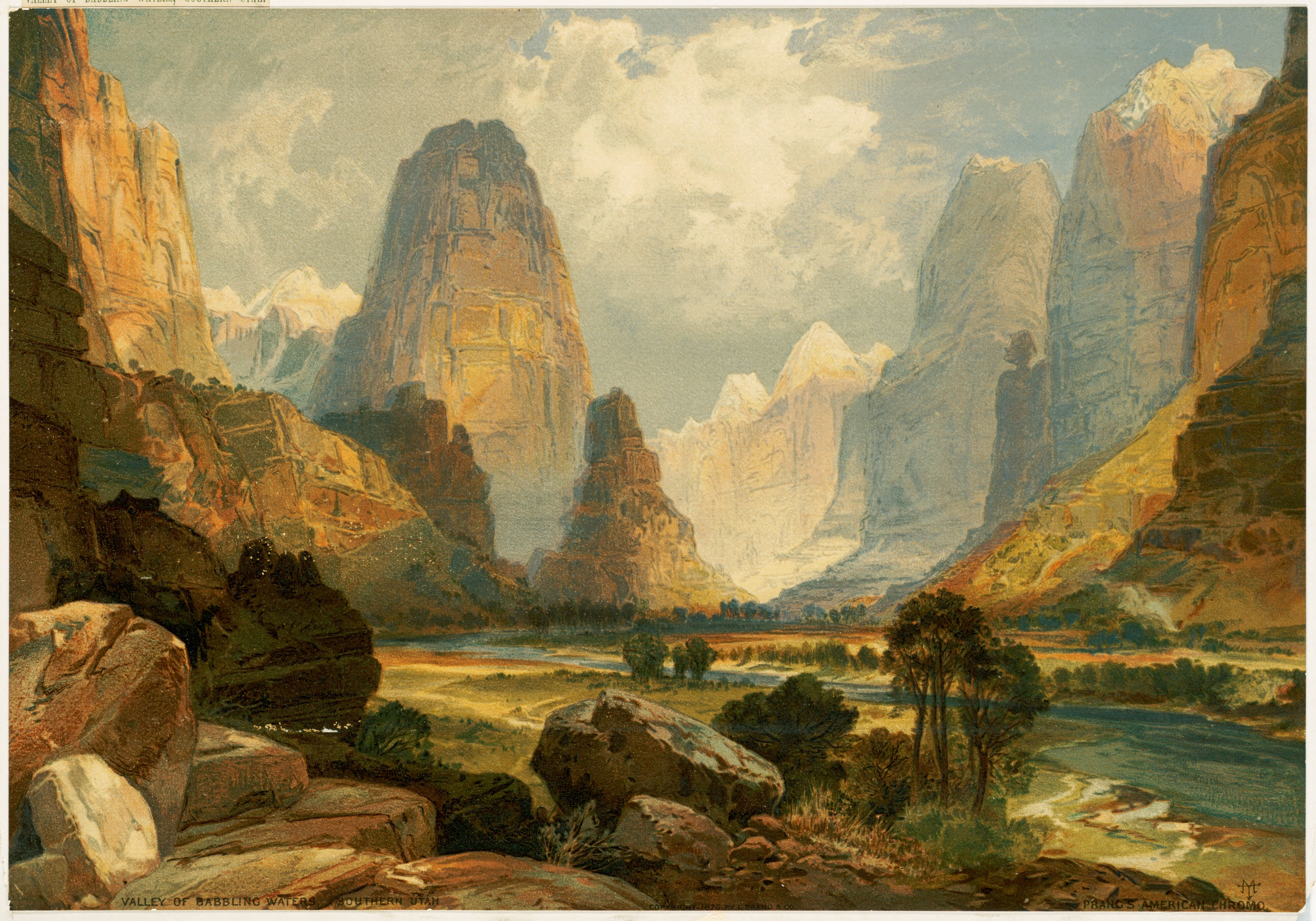
Valley of Babbling Waters, Southern Utah, (c) 1876; from the Louis Prang & Company Collection of the Boston Public Library

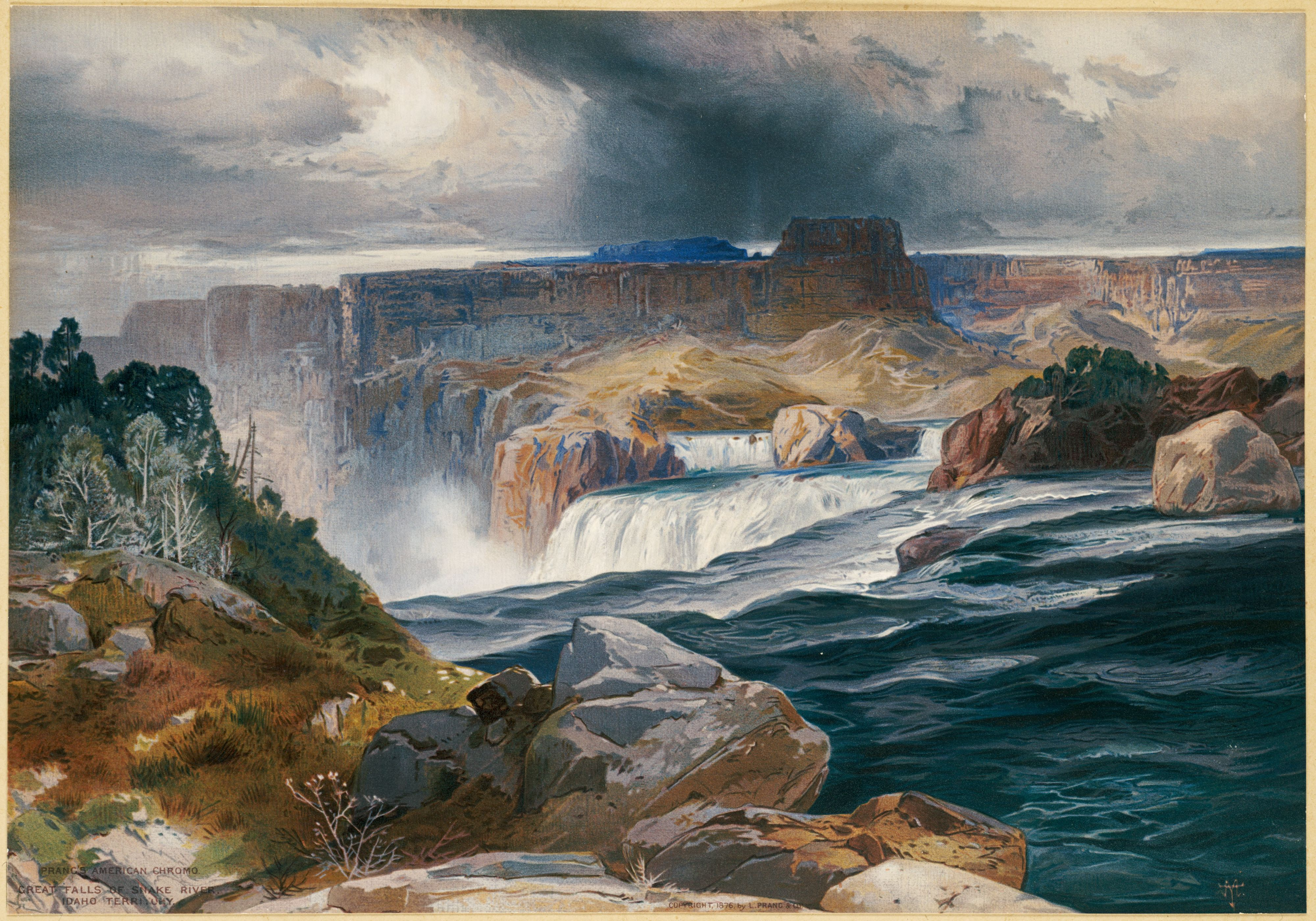
Great falls of Snake River, Idaho Territory, (c) 1876; from the Louis Prang & Company Collection of the Boston Public Library

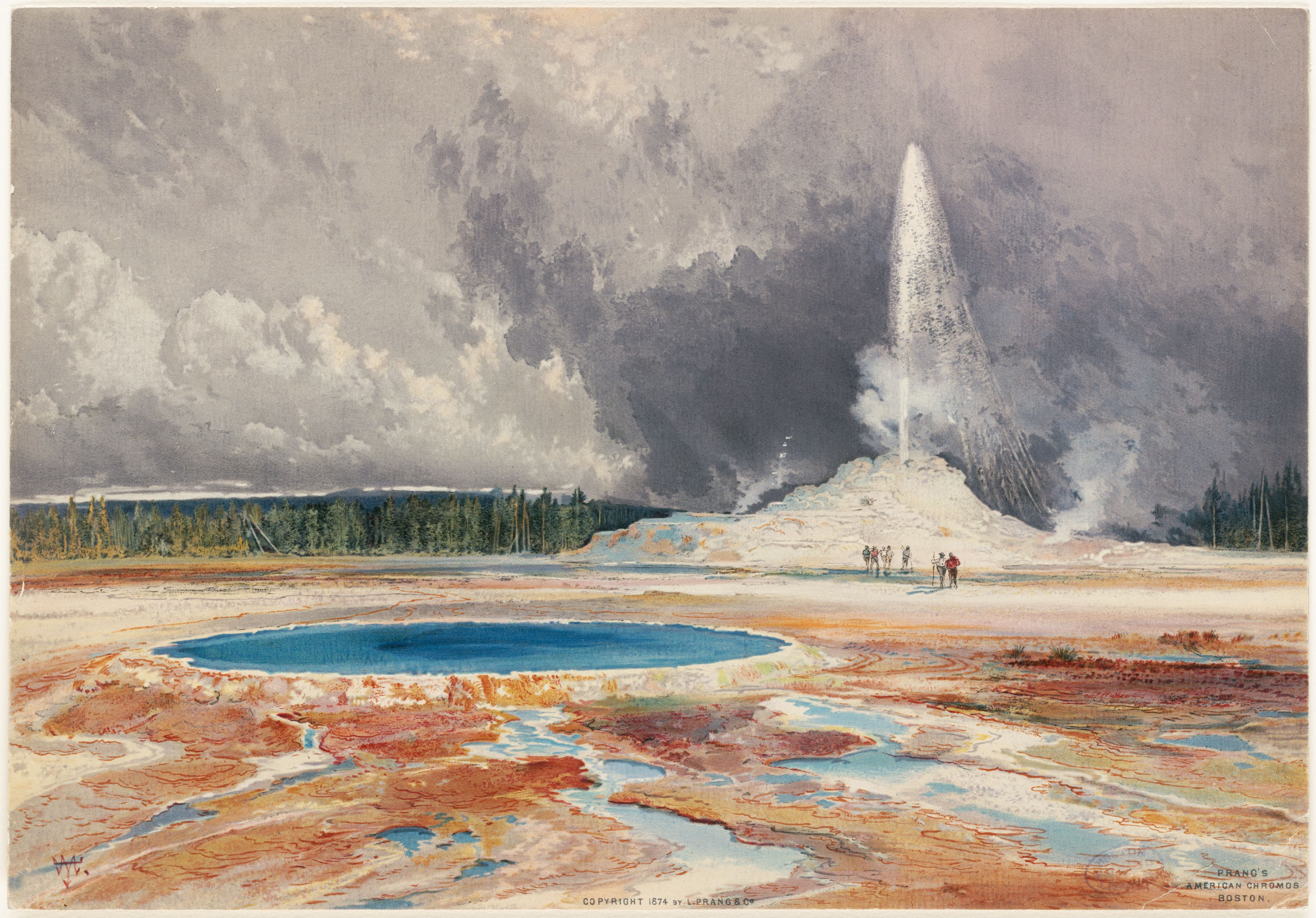
The Castle Geyser, Upper Geyser Park, (c) 1874; from the Louis Prang & Company Collection of the Boston Public Library

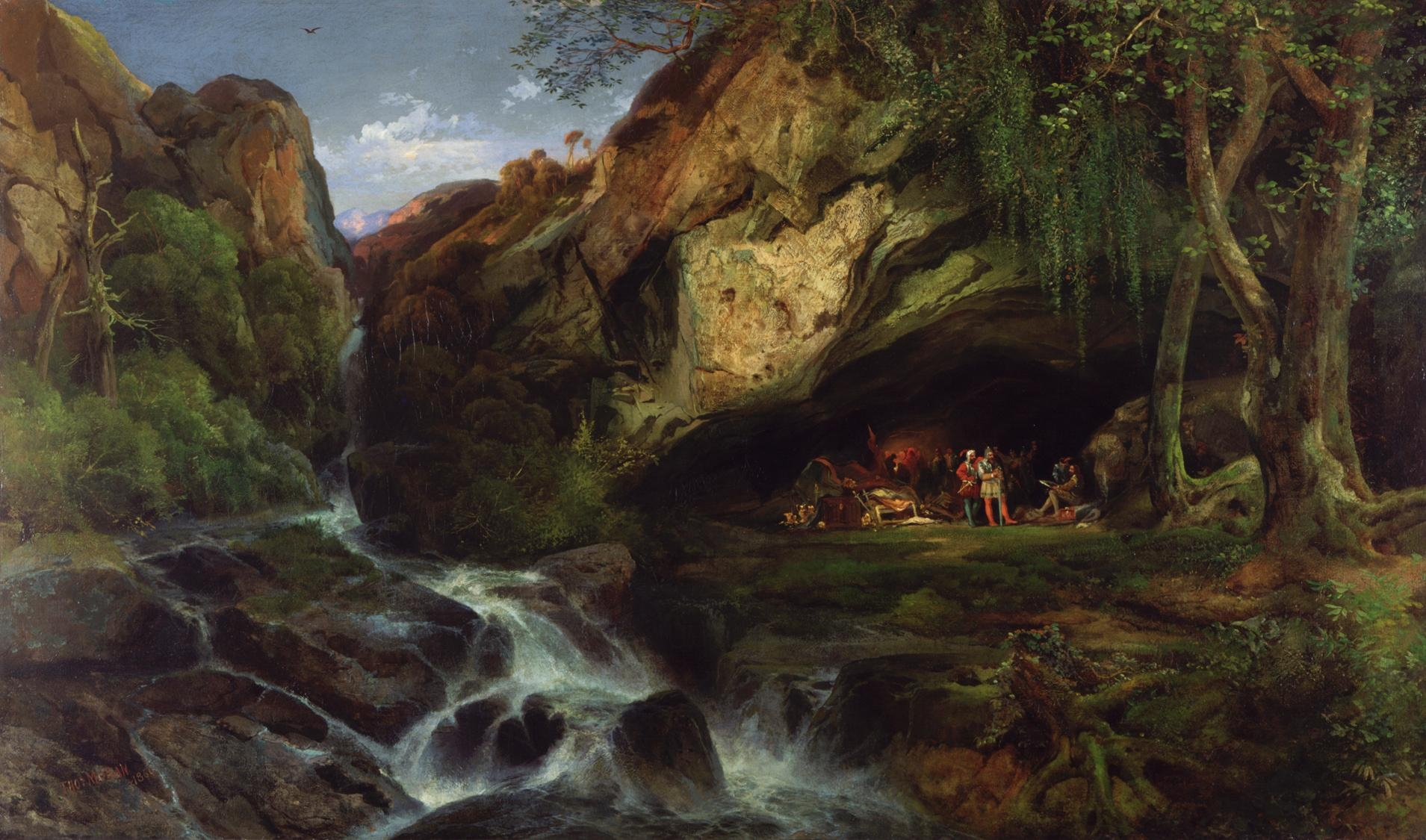
Salvator Rosa Sketching the Banditi, 1860, Chrysler Museum of Art

== See also ==
- List of Hudson River School artists
- Edward Moran
- New York Etching Club
- Opus 24: Rome, from the Campagna, Sunset
- Western painting

== Sources ==
- Wilkins, Thurman; Hinkley, Caroline L; Goetzmann, William H. (1998). Thomas Moran: Artist of the Mountains. University of Oklahoma Press. ISBN 978-0-8061-3040-8. LCC N6537.M6443 W55 1998.
- Kinsey, Joni Louise (1992). Thomas Moran and the Surveying of the American West. Washington and London: Smithsonian Institution Press. ISBN 1-56098-170-9.
