= The Three Tetons =

Painting by Thomas Moran

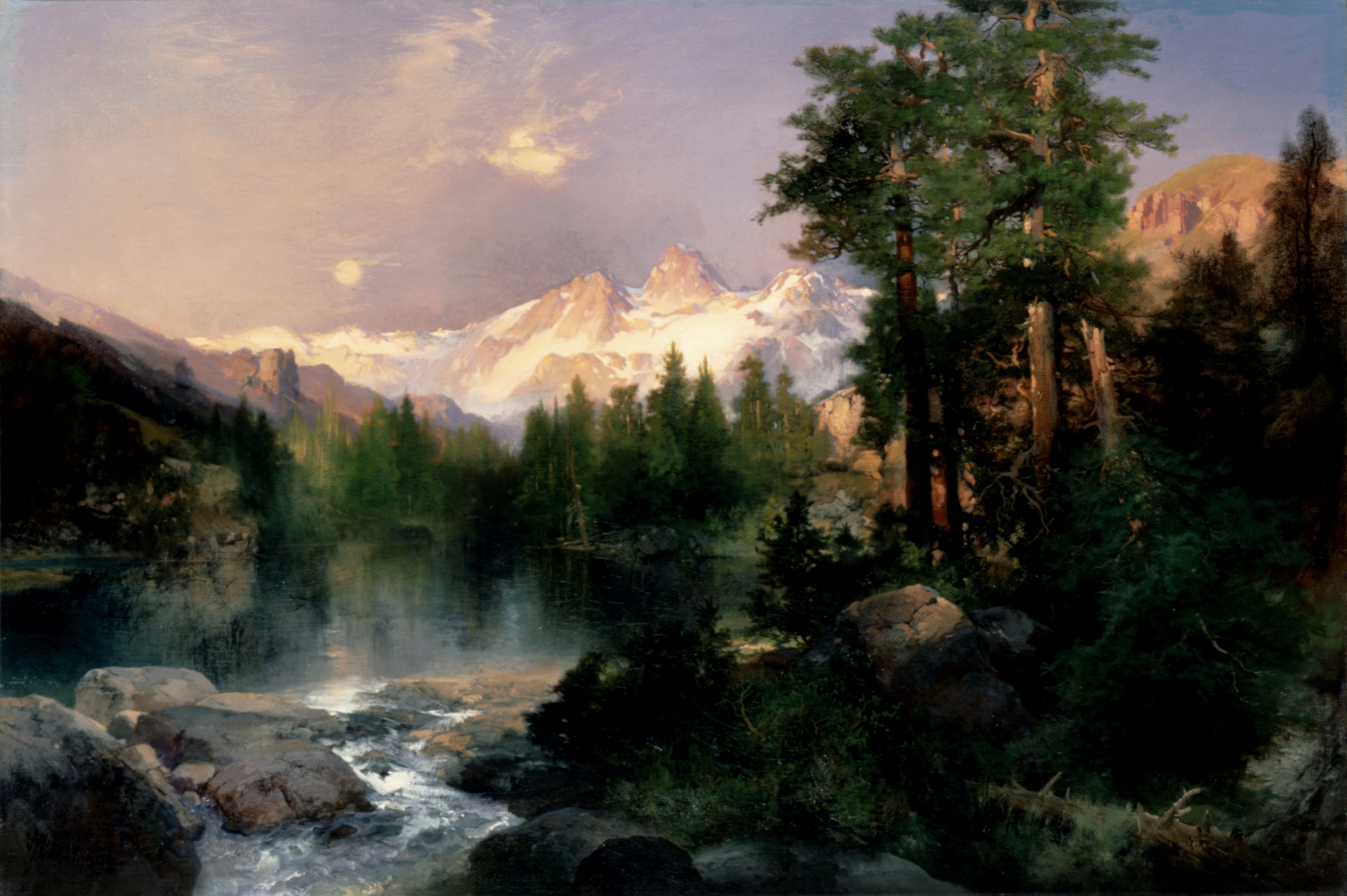
- Artist: Thomas Moran
- Year: 1895
- Medium: Oil on canvas
- Subject: The Teton Range
- Dimensions: 52.4 cm × 77.5 cm (20.6 in × 30.5 in)
- Location: Washington, D.C.
- Owner: White House
- Accession: 966.591.1

The Three Tetons is an 1895 oil painting by Thomas Moran. It depicts Grand Teton and the neighbouring peaks of Middle Teton and South Teton, from the Idaho side. The National Park Service describes Moran as, after Albert Bierstadt, the "other 'grand' painter of the Tetons".

Moran sketched the Grand Teton mountains from a distance in August 1879, and this painting is based on those sketches. It depicts the snow-clad mountains in the distance, catching the Sun below a hazy blue sky with light clouds, with the foreground dominated by dark pine trees around a lake and river. The painting measures 52.4 cm × 77.5 cm (20.6 in × 30.5 in), and is signed and dated in the lower left corner "TYMORAN 1895". Moran made at least two other oil paintings of the Tetons: The Teton Range (1897, Metropolitan Museum of Art), and In The Teton Range (1899, American Museum of Western Art).

The painting was donated to the White House art collection by C. R. Smith, president of American Airlines. It is the earliest of three landscape paintings by Moran in the White House art collection, the other two being his 1912 painting of Point Lobos, Monterey and a 1909-1910 painting of the cliffs of the Green River, Wyoming. The Three Tetons has been displayed in the Oval Office in the presidencies of George H. W. Bush, Bill Clinton, Barack Obama, and Donald Trump to the right of Rembrandt Peale's 1795 Porthole Portrait of George Washington.

== Gallery ==
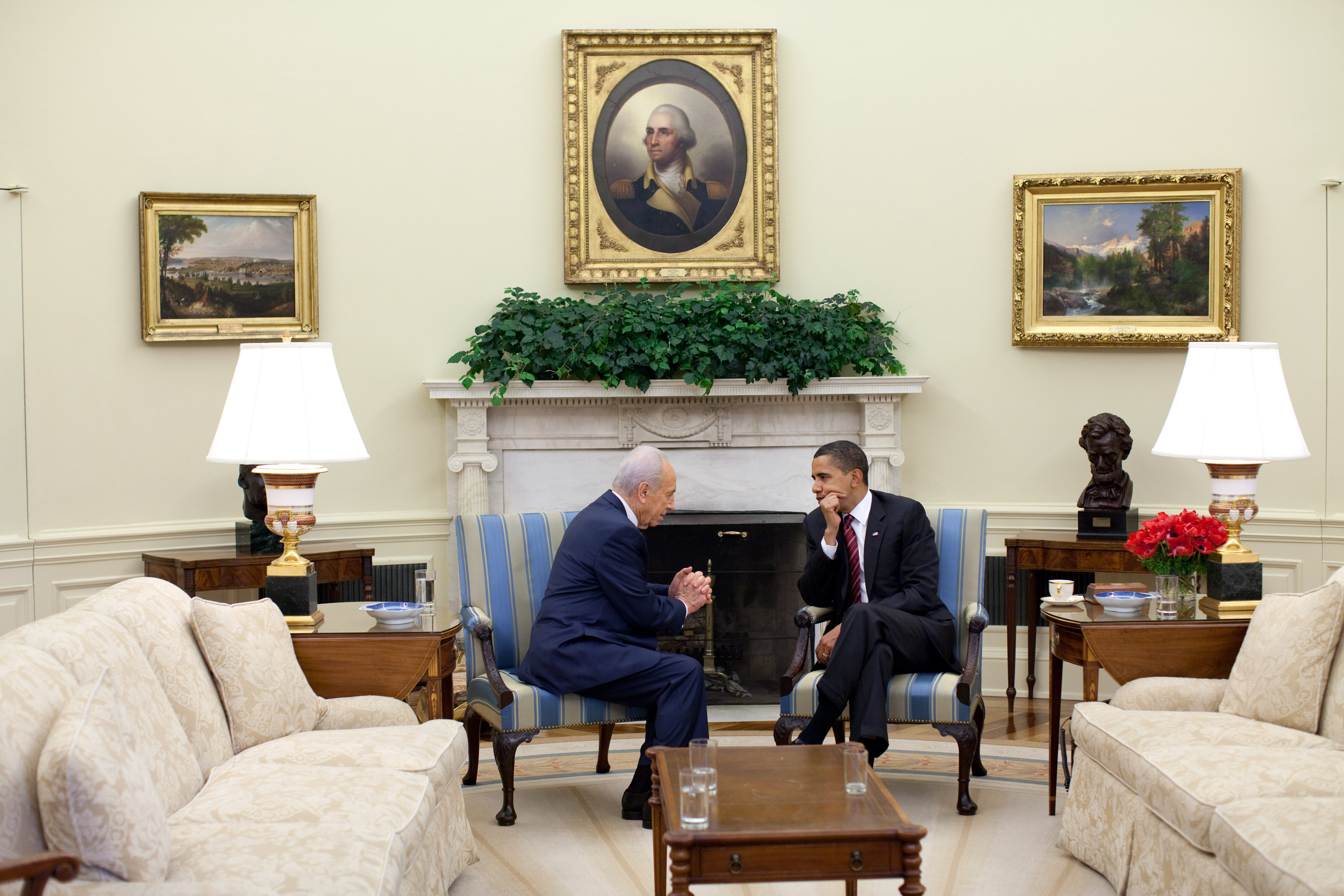
The Three Tetons, in the Oval Office in 2009 (on the right)

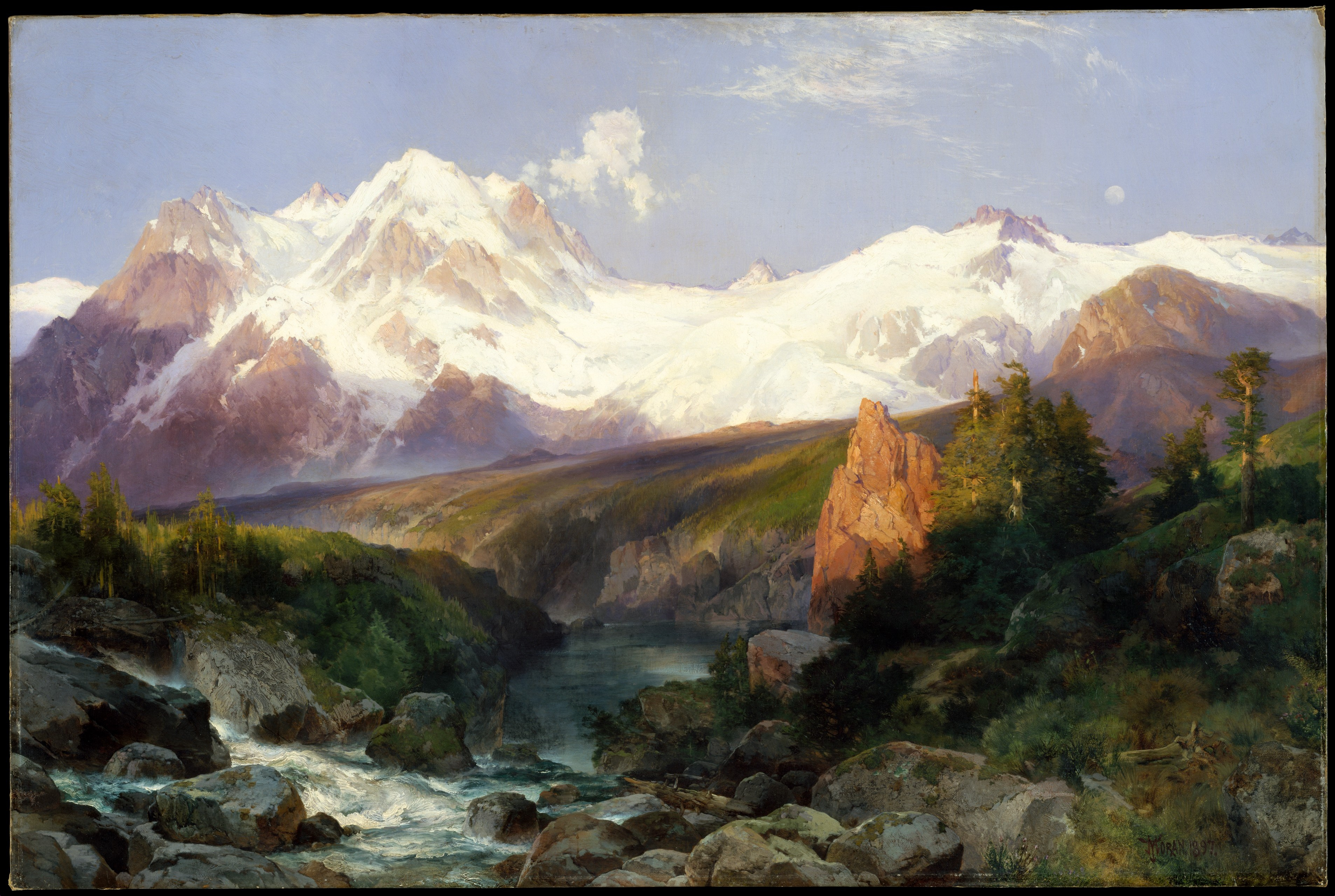
The Teton Range, 1897, Metropolitan Museum of Art

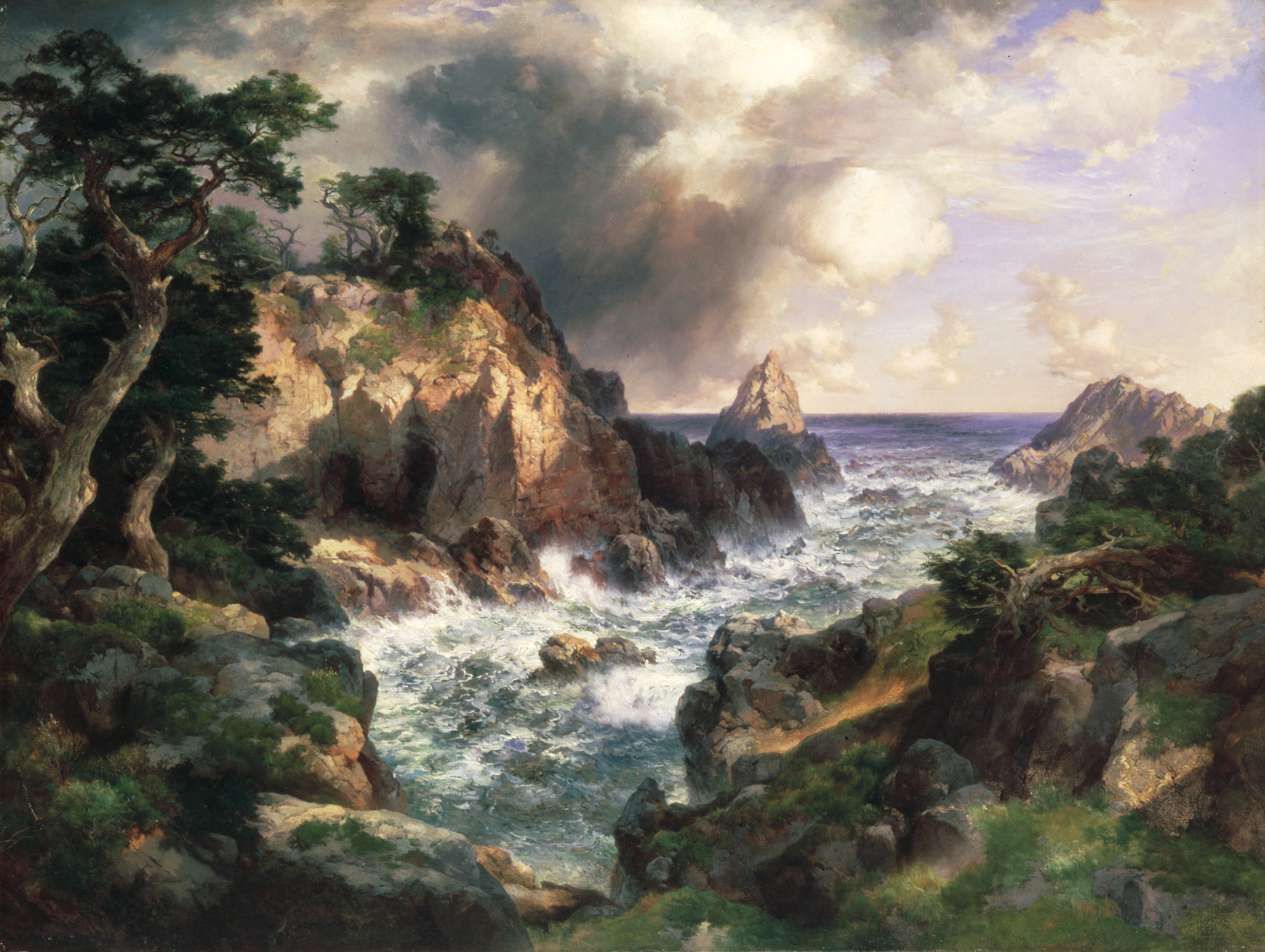
Point Lobos, Monterey, California, 1910, White House art collection

== See also ==
- Art in the White House
