= Salvator Rosa Sketching the Banditi (Moran) =

1860 oil painting on canvas by Thomas Moran

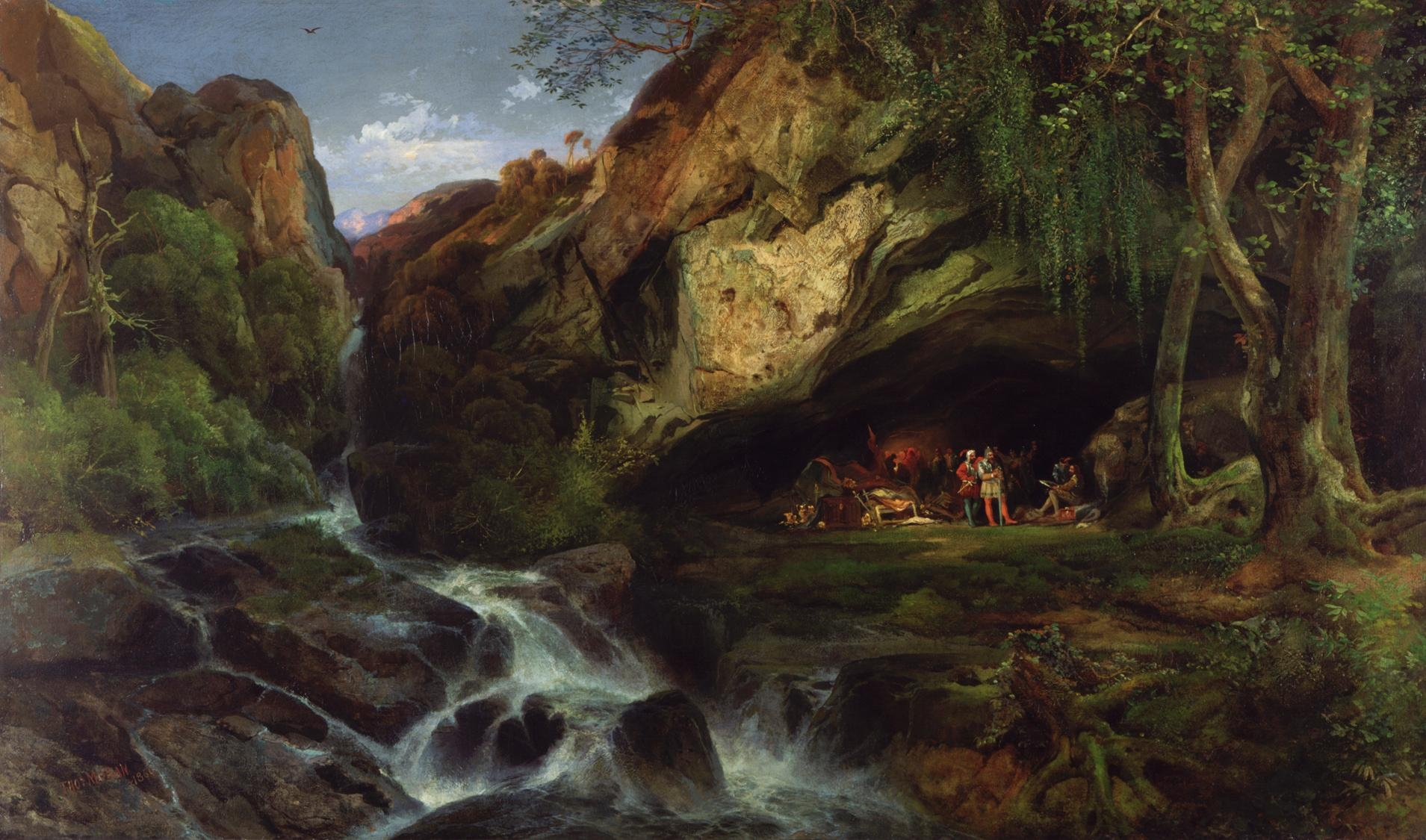
- Artist: Thomas Moran
- Year: 1860
- Medium: oil on canvas
- Movement: Romanticism
- Dimensions: 101,6 cm × 169,9 cm (400 in × 669 in)
- Location: Chrysler Museum of Art, Norfolk

Salvator Rosa Sketching the Banditi is an 1860 oil painting on canvas by Thomas Moran hosted at the Chrysler Museum of Art, Norfolk, Virginia.

== Background ==
The protagonist of the painting is the baroque artist and poet Salvator Rosa. Born in Naples in 1615, during his artistic career he travelled across the Italian Peninsula in search of patronage. From the 1630s Rosa started to sketch and paint studies of bandits and soldiers that were present in post-tridentine Italy, a practice that culminated with the 1656 oil on canvas Bandits on a Rocky Coast.

During the age of Grand Tour Salvator Rosa became one of the favourite artists of the travellers from Northern Europe and America, due to his haunting and dark landscapes that inspired many visitors, and Rosa started to be considered as a pre-romantic artist. Of the various legends that started to appear after his shadow, a common one recounts that he was part of a group of bandits (banditi) that ravaged central and southern Italy. Although this story is not historically supported, it inspired many authors like Lady Morgan, who made its as a subject to her 1824 novel The Life and Times of Salvator Rosa, and E.T.A. Hoffmann with his short story Signor Formica, dated 1820.

== Description ==
Thomas Moran managed to visit Italy for the first time in February 1867 after a stay in France with his family. He travelled across the Peninsula, united six years before in the newly Kingdom of Italy with the posthumous annexation of the Veneto and Friuli after the Third Italian War of Independence (1866). During a quick visit at the Brera Gallery in Milan, he had the opportunity to see many sketches of Leonardo da Vinci and Salvatro Rosa, that he copied as practice, but considering the date of the painting is more probable that Moran was inspired by another American artist, Thomas Cole, who already described the same subject decades before in the 1830s. Both Cole and Moran were members of the Hudson River School and both their Salvator Rosa Sketching the Banditi share the same sublime scenery that is common to the landscape paintings of the school and the pre-romantic quality of Rosa's canvas Bandits on a Rocky Coast.
