= International Animated Film Festival =

International Animated Film Festival may refer to:

- Annecy International Animated Film Festival
- Hiroshima International Animation Festival
- Kalamazoo Animation Festival International
- KROK International Animated Films Festival
- Melbourne International Animation Festival
- Ottawa International Animation Festival
- Red Stick International Animation Festival

It may also refer to:

- International Comics and Animation Festival
- Dok Leipzig

See also:

- List of major animation festivals
