= List of international animation festivals =

This is a list of past and present international animation festivals: festivals principally devoted to animated film that show work from more than one country. Some are competitive; others are curated showcases, and some are touring programmes not based in a single city.

Festivals are included when extensive independent sources cover them. Qualifying status for the Academy Award for Best Animated Short Film and patronage by ASIFA are further evidence of a festival's standing. General film festivals with animation sections, award ceremonies and immersive-media events are not included.

Years held gives documented editions or spans of activity; a range does not imply an edition every year, and "(documented)" marks the earliest and latest editions found in sources. Status is Active, Ended, Merged (continued in another festival), Relocated (continued in another city), Dormant (a pause reported by the festival or the press) or Unknown (current status not established by the cited sources).

== List ==
Name	Location	Country	Years held	Status	Notes
Anibar International Animation Festival	Peja	Kosovo	2010–present	Active	
AniFest	Třeboň, later Teplice	Czech Republic	2002–2013	Merged	Moved from Třeboň to Teplice in 2010; merged into Anifilm from 2014
Anifilm	Liberec; Třeboň until 2019	Czech Republic	2010–present	Active	Held in Třeboň until 2019, Liberec from 2020; absorbed AniFest in 2014
Anim'est	Bucharest	Romania	2006–present	Active	Academy Award qualifying festival
Anima Mundi	Rio de Janeiro and São Paulo	Brazil	1993–2019	Dormant	No edition since the 27th in 2019
Anima – Brussels International Animation Film Festival	Brussels	Belgium	1982–present	Active	Founded by Philippe Moins as Rencontres du cinéma d'animation; named Anima in 2003
ANIMA – Córdoba International Animation Festival	Córdoba	Argentina	2001–present	Active	Organised by the National University of Córdoba; biennial until 2021, annual since
Animac	Lleida	Spain	1996–present	Active	First held as Cinemàgic in 1996; renamed Animac from its second edition
Animafest Zagreb	Zagreb	Croatia	1972–present	Active	Biennial until 2005, annual since
ANIMAFILM International Animation Festival	Baku	Azerbaijan	2018–present	Active	An echo programme was held in Shaki in November 2021
Animahenasyon	Various, including Quezon City	Philippines	2007–present	Active	Run by the Animation Council of the Philippines; competition now open to Southeast Asian entrants
Animasyros	Ermoupoli, Syros	Greece	2008–present	Active	
Animated Encounters	Bristol	United Kingdom	2000–2005	Merged	Merged with Brief Encounters in 2006; animation continues at Encounters Film Festival
Animateka	Ljubljana	Slovenia	2004–present	Active	Held each December
Animation Dingle	Dingle	Ireland	2012–present	Active	Began within the Dingle International Film Festival in 2012; first full conference in 2015; Academy Award qualifying festival
The Animation Show	Touring	United States	2003–2008 (documented)	Unknown	Touring programme founded by Mike Judge and Don Hertzfeldt; fourth edition in 2008
Animator	Poznań	Poland	2008–present	Active	Academy Award qualifying festival
Animatricks	Helsinki	Finland	2000–present	Active	
Animayo	Las Palmas	Spain	2006–present	Active	Animation, visual effects and video games festival; has held satellite editions abroad; Academy Award qualifying festival
Animaze Montreal International Film Festival	Montreal	Canada	2011–present	Active	
Animex	Middlesbrough	United Kingdom	2000–present	Active	Teesside University festival of animation, visual effects and games
Annecy International Animation Film Festival	Annecy	France	1960–present	Active	Continued the animation days held at Cannes in 1956 and 1958
Baros International Animation Festival	Cimahi	Indonesia	2013–2018 (documented)	Unknown	Organised by Cimahi city government and Cimahi Creative Association
BitBang	Buenos Aires	Argentina	2015–present	Active	Academy Award qualifying festival
Bradford Animation Festival	Bradford	United Kingdom	1994–2014	Ended	Held at the National Science and Media Museum
Bucheon International Animation Festival (BIAF)	Bucheon	South Korea	1999–present	Active	Began as Puchon International Student Animation Festival (PISAF); renamed BIAF in 2015; Academy Award qualifying festival
Cambridge Animation Festival	Cambridge	United Kingdom	1965, 1967, 1968; 1979, 1981, 1983, 1985	Ended	Founded by Dick Arnall; continued in Bristol
Canterbury Anifest	Canterbury	United Kingdom	2007–2021 (documented)	Unknown	Online edition advertised for February 2021
Cartoons on the Bay	Various; Pescara in recent years	Italy	1996–present	Active	Organised by RAI; awards the Pulcinella Awards
I Castelli Animati	Genzano di Roma; later Rome	Italy	1996–2022 (documented)	Unknown	Italy's festival in the Cartoon d'Or circuit from 2000; held within Romics in 2019 and 2022
Chaniartoon	Chania	Greece	2017–present	Active	Comics and animation festival
Chilemonos	Santiago	Chile	2012–present	Active	Academy Award qualifying festival
China International Cartoon and Animation Festival (CICAF)	Hangzhou	China	2005–present	Active	State animation and comics festival and trade fair
Cinanima	Espinho	Portugal	1977–present	Active	A trial event in November 1976 preceded the first edition
Cortoons	Gandia; Rome until 2015	Spain	2004–present	Active	Founded in Rome; moved to Gandia in 2016
DRAWTASTIC Animation Festival (formerly 2D Or Not 2D)	Everett, later Seattle; now online	United States	2006–present	Active	Renamed DRAWTASTIC; run by the 2D Animation Museum, which lists winners from 2018 and 2021 to 2025
Fantoche	Baden	Switzerland	1995–present	Active	Biennial until 2009, annual since 2010; 2001 edition cancelled; Academy Award qualifying festival
Fest Anča	Žilina	Slovakia	2008–present	Active	Academy Award qualifying festival since 2023
Festival of Animation Berlin (FAB)	Berlin	Germany	2017–2023, 2025–present	Active	Began as a one-evening programme in 2017; sabbatical in 2024
FICAM	Meknès	Morocco	2001–present	Active	Founded by the Institut français de Meknès; international short competition since 2009; 24th edition May 2026
Flip Animation Festival	Wolverhampton	United Kingdom	2004–2012	Ended	
Fredrikstad Animation Festival	Fredrikstad	Norway	1994–present	Active	Began as Animerte Dager in Oslo; Nordic–Baltic short competition
GLAS Animation Festival	Berkeley; Los Angeles since 2025	United States	2016–2022, 2025–present	Active	Held in Berkeley from 2016; returned in person in Los Angeles in 2025
Hiroshima Animation Season	Hiroshima	Japan	2022–present	Active	Biennial; Academy Award qualifying festival
Hiroshima International Animation Festival	Hiroshima	Japan	1985–2020	Ended	Discontinued by Hiroshima city after its 18th edition
Holland Animation Film Festival	Utrecht	Netherlands	1985–2017	Merged	Founded by Gerrit van Dijk and Gerben Schermer; 2018 edition cancelled; merged with KLIK into Kaboom in 2019
Imaginaria	Conversano	Italy	2003–present	Active	Academy Award qualifying festival
International Animated Film Festival	National Film Theatre, London	United Kingdom	1957	Ended	Organised by John Halas with the British Film Institute; films from eighteen countries
International Animation Festival, Bristol	Bristol	United Kingdom	1987, 1989	Ended	Continuation of the Cambridge festival, directed by Irene Kotlarz
International Animation Festival, Cardiff	Cardiff	United Kingdom	1992, 1994, 1996, 1998	Ended	Continuation of the Bristol festival; renamed Vital in 1998
International Tournée of Animation	Touring	United States	Mid-1960s–1994 (documented)	Unknown	Grew out of the First Festival of Animated Film, Los Angeles, 1965; annual touring programme
Journées internationales du cinéma d'animation	Cannes	France	1956, 1958	Relocated	Held alongside the Cannes Film Festival; its third edition, in 1960, was held in Annecy
Kaboom Animation Festival	Utrecht and Amsterdam	Netherlands	2019–present	Active	Formed in 2019 by merging the Holland Animation Film Festival and KLIK Amsterdam; Academy Award qualifying festival
Kecskemét Animation Film Festival	Kecskemét	Hungary	1985–present	Active	Held every three years until 2005, then every two years; international since 1993
KLIK Amsterdam Animation Festival	Amsterdam	Netherlands	2007–2018	Merged	Founded as KLIT! Animatie Festival Amsterdam; merged with Holland Animation Film Festival into Kaboom in 2019
KROK	River cruises on the Dnieper or Volga	Ukraine and Russia	1989–2019 (documented)	Unknown	Shipboard festival; touring showcases announced in 2022
London International Animation Festival	London	United Kingdom	2003–present	Active	
Los Angeles International Animation Celebration	Los Angeles	United States	1985–1991	Ended	Run by Terry Thoren for Expanded Entertainment; revived in 1997 as part of the World Animation Celebration
Lucca international animation meeting	Lucca	Italy	1972–1992 (documented)	Ended	Animation strand of the Lucca comics salon
Mamaia International Animation Festival	Mamaia	Romania	1966, 1968, 1970	Ended	Held in the years between Annecy editions; closed for lack of funding after 1970
Manchester Animation Festival	Manchester	United Kingdom	2015–present	Active	
Melbourne International Animation Festival	Melbourne	Australia	2001–present	Active	Cancelled in 2022; held annually since
Monstra	Lisbon	Portugal	2000–present	Active	
New Chitose Airport International Animation Festival	Chitose	Japan	2014–present	Active	Held inside the New Chitose Airport terminal, Hokkaido
Ottawa International Animation Festival	Ottawa	Canada	1976–present	Active	Run by the Canadian Film Institute; Academy Award qualifying festival
Pixelatl	Guadalajara; earlier Mexico City, Torreón and Cuernavaca	Mexico	2012, 2014–present	Active	No festival in 2013
ReAnimania	Yerevan	Armenia	2009–present	Active	Animation and comics festival
Red Stick International Animation Festival	Baton Rouge	United States	2005–2012	Ended	Created at LSU's Center for Computation and Technology; replaced in 2014 by the broader FutureFest
Scotland Loves Anime	Glasgow, Edinburgh and London	United Kingdom	2010–present	Active	Festival of Japanese animation
Seoul International Cartoon and Animation Festival (SICAF)	Seoul	South Korea	1995–2021	Ended	Last held as the 25th edition, October 2021
Shanghai International Animation Festival	Shanghai	China	1988, 1992 (documented)	Ended	Separate from the Shanghai International Film Festival; Edera gives editions in 1990 and 1992
Sogetsu Animation Festival	Tokyo	Japan	1964, 1965, 1966	Ended	Held at the Sogetsu Art Center
Sommets du cinéma d'animation	Montreal	Canada	2002–present	Active	Organised by the Cinémathèque québécoise
Spark Animation	Vancouver	Canada	2008–present	Active	Run by the Spark Computer Graphics Society; Academy Award qualifying festival
Spike and Mike's Festival of Animation	Touring	United States	1977–present	Active	Founded in Riverside, California; Skybound announced a theatrical revival in 2025
Stuttgart International Festival of Animated Film	Stuttgart	Germany	1982–present	Active	Biennial at first, now annual
Supertoon	Šibenik; Bol 2011–2012	Croatia	2011–present	Active	First two editions held in Bol on Brač; in Šibenik since 2013; includes comics
Sweaty Eyeballs Animation Festival	Baltimore	United States	2012–present	Active	One-night invitational screenings 2012–2018; full juried festival since 2019
Tehran International Animation Festival (TIAF)	Tehran	Iran	2000–present	Active	Biennial; organised by the Kanoon; Encyclopaedia Iranica dates its founding to 1999
Viborg Animation Festival	Viborg	Denmark	2012–present	Active	Organised by The Animation Workshop with Viborg Municipality
VOID International Animation Film Festival	Copenhagen	Denmark	2016–2021	Dormant	On hiatus since 2022; 2021 edition partly online
Waterloo Festival for Animated Cinema	Waterloo	Canada	2001–2013 (documented)	Unknown	Non-competitive festival of animated features; thirteenth edition advertised for 2013
World Festival of Animated Film Varna	Varna	Bulgaria	1979–1989, 2011–present	Active	Held under ASIFA patronage 1979–1989; revived in 2011; 21st edition in 2025
