= Emily Kelley Moran =

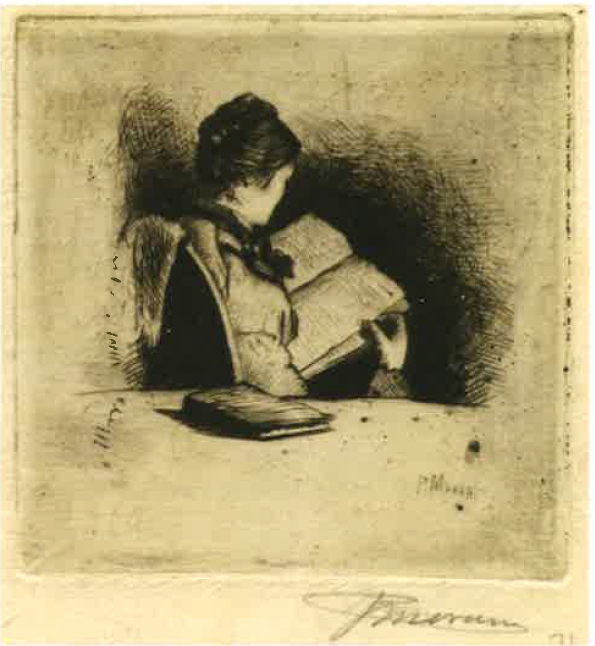
- etching by Peter Moran, 1880
- Born: February 21, 1841; Dublin
- Died: May 22, 1903 (aged 62); Philadelphia
- Occupation: Etcher, painter
- Spouse(s): Peter Moran

Emily Kelley Moran (February 21, 1841 – May 22, 1903) was an Irish-born American artist. She was one of the earliest female etchers in the United States and her career coincided with the rise of the etching revival.

Emily Kelley was born on February 21, 1841 in Dublin, Ireland. Probably after the death of her father, her mother brought the family to live with their uncle, a dry goods merchant in Philadelphia. In 1867, she married Peter Moran, one of the quartet of Moran brothers who were artists in Philadelphia. (His brothers were Thomas Moran, Edward Moran, and John Moran.) She may have been one of his art students at the Philadelphia School of Design for Women.

All of her nineteen known etchings are landscapes, many of the Schuylkill River. She was included in important exhibitions of etchings organized by Sylvester Rosa Koehler: the Exhibition of American Etchings in 1881 and The Work of the Women Etchers of America in 1887. Her work was also exhibited at the Chicago World's Columbian Exposition in 1893. She also exhibited her paintings.

Emily Kelley Moran died on 22 May 1903 in Philadelphia.
