= T. S. Sullivant =

American cartoonist (1854–1926)

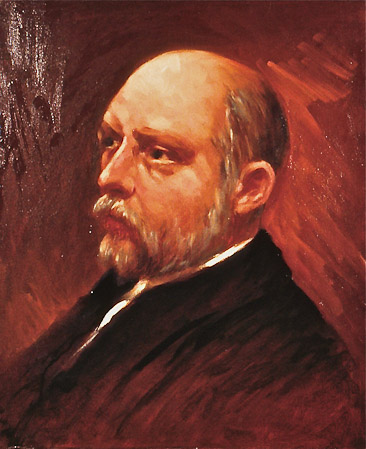
- Portrait of Sullivant by Thomas P. Anshutz (1895)
- Born: Thomas Starling Sullivant; November 4, 1854 Columbus, Ohio, U.S.
- Died: August 7, 1926 (aged 71)
- Area: Cartoonist

Thomas Starling Sullivant (November 4, 1854 – August 7, 1926) was an American cartoonist who signed his work T. S. Sullivant. His work appeared most frequently in the pages of the humorous Life magazine. Best known for his animal and ethnic caricatures, he also drew political cartoons and comic strip toppers, and illustrated children's books. He drew in a heavily cross-hatched pen-and-ink style, with humans and animals depicted with greatly exaggerated features that are nevertheless firmly rooted in his understanding of correct anatomy. (He is sometimes referred to as Thomas S. Sullivant or T.S. Sullivant.

== Personal history ==
Thomas Starling Sullivant was born in Columbus, Ohio, where his father, William Starling Sullivant, was a leading bryologist. He was raised in Germany, where he may have studied art. At the age of 18, Sullivant left Columbus and lived in Europe for several years, eventually returning to live in Philadelphia. In 1885, he studied under Thomas Eakins at the Pennsylvania Academy of the Fine Arts.

Seeking the opinion of artist A. B. Frost, Sullivant was told to send his art around to the top publications of the period. In 1886, when Sullivant was 32, his first published cartoons appeared in the minor humor magazine Truth. The following year, he surfaced in the leading humor publication Puck, and his work was also in other periodicals, including Harper's Weekly and Texas Siftings. Soon he was seen in the pages of Life with his "Aesop to Date" series and other cartoons.

He studied with the Philadelphia painter Edward Moran, and he became an apprentice to illustrator E. B. Bensell, noted for his pen-and-ink drawings and wood engravings. Godey's Lady's Book described Bensell as "an illustrator of the old school, who drew on the wooden block".

Sullivant was a member of the Philadelphia Sketch Club from 1888 to 1904. By the turn of the century, Sullivant switched from Life to Judge. In 1904, he signed on to draw political cartoons for William Randolph Hearst, continuing in that position until 1907. Leaving Hearst, he studied in Europe, returning to the pages of Life in 1911. He continued to contribute to Life until his death in 1926.

== Style ==
Sullivant was a pen-and-ink artist, working during a time when penwork with meticulously cross-hatched shading, like that of Charles Dana Gibson, was particularly flourishing. While working technically within the rerstaints of such classical drawing, Sullivant and others like A. B. Frost and E. W. Kemble, sought out new, playful means of expression. Sullivant played with distorting anatomy, perspective and animation. A striking feature was the greatly enlarged heads on hs figures, which, throughout the 1890s, became more and more exaggerated, an innovation pioneered by Frost that was widely imitated by his peers.

Sullivant was noted largely for his animal caricatures and his character types—ethnic types like Irishmen, Jews and Negroes familiar in the American melting pot, as well as farmers, tramps and the suburban families which were emerging at the time. His "grotesque yet believable" animals were remarkably detailed and anatomically accurate, despite their gross exaggeration, and expressive in the moods, emotions and attitudes they displayed. The anatomical accuracy of his work was greatly helped by Eadweard Muybridge's photographic studies of human and animal movement. It was the visuals and the action in his cartoons that were most often the "gag"—frequently the caption added little to the enjoyment of the cartoon.

Sullivant had a penchant for using razor blades in his quest for perfection in his work, but not for the shading effects a razor can produce that many other cartoonists used it for. He used it to erase by scratching out work he was dissatisfied with, so he could draw on the paper again, saving only the parts of the drawing he could not part with. Happy Hooligan's Frederick Burr Opper commented on Sullivant's frequent razor blade use saying, "If Tom Sullivant scratched his head as much as his paper, he'd draw better cartoons!"

His work became looser, more simplified and more exaggerated as Sullivant got older. According to animator Nancy Beiman, his later work, in his sixties, was the best of his career.

== Legacy ==
Sullivant influenced numerous cartoonists, notably Walt Kelly, who hung a Sullivant original, "The Naming of the Animals", over his studio door; and Jim Woodring, who wrote a scholarly article on him for The Comics Journal. He had an enormous influence on the early history of American animation, second perhaps after Winsor McCay. He was especially influential in the Walt Disney Studios after T. Hee brought in a collection of Sullivant clippings to use as inspiration for the "Dance of the Hours" sequence in Fantasia. His influence is also apparent in the Walrus in Alice in Wonderland and the elephants in Dumbo. Hee continued to use these clippings as a teacher at the California Institute of the Arts well into the 1980s. Other animators who bore Sullivant's influence were John Randolph Bray and Nancy Beiman.

== Books ==
- Fables for the Times (R.H. Russel & Son, 1896) reprinted the series "Aesop to Date" from Life
- Sullivant's ABC Zoo (The Old Wine Press, New York, 1946), collection of animal cartoons

== Gallery ==
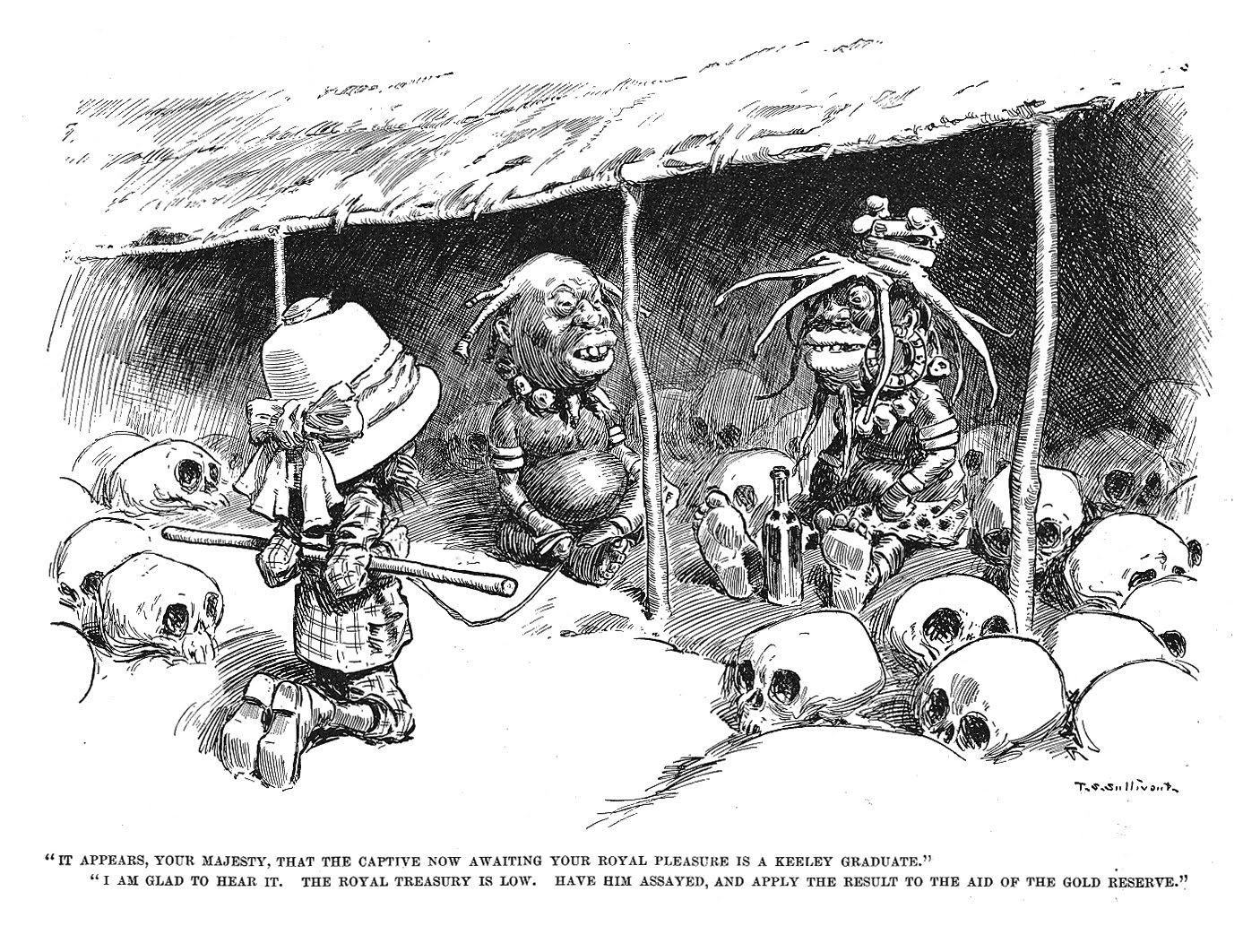

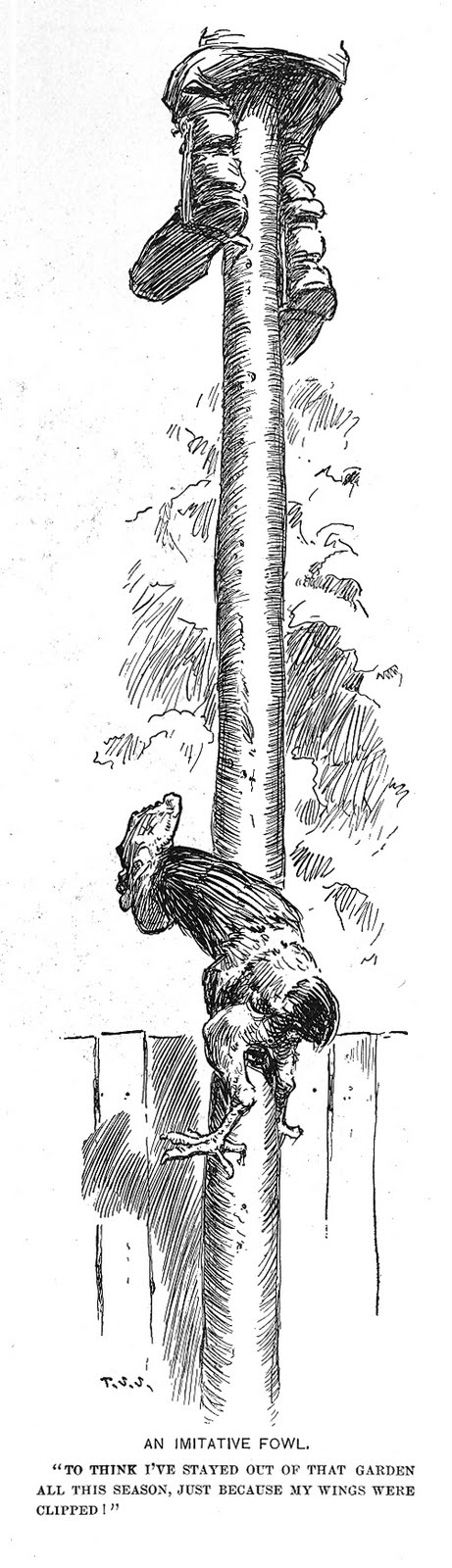

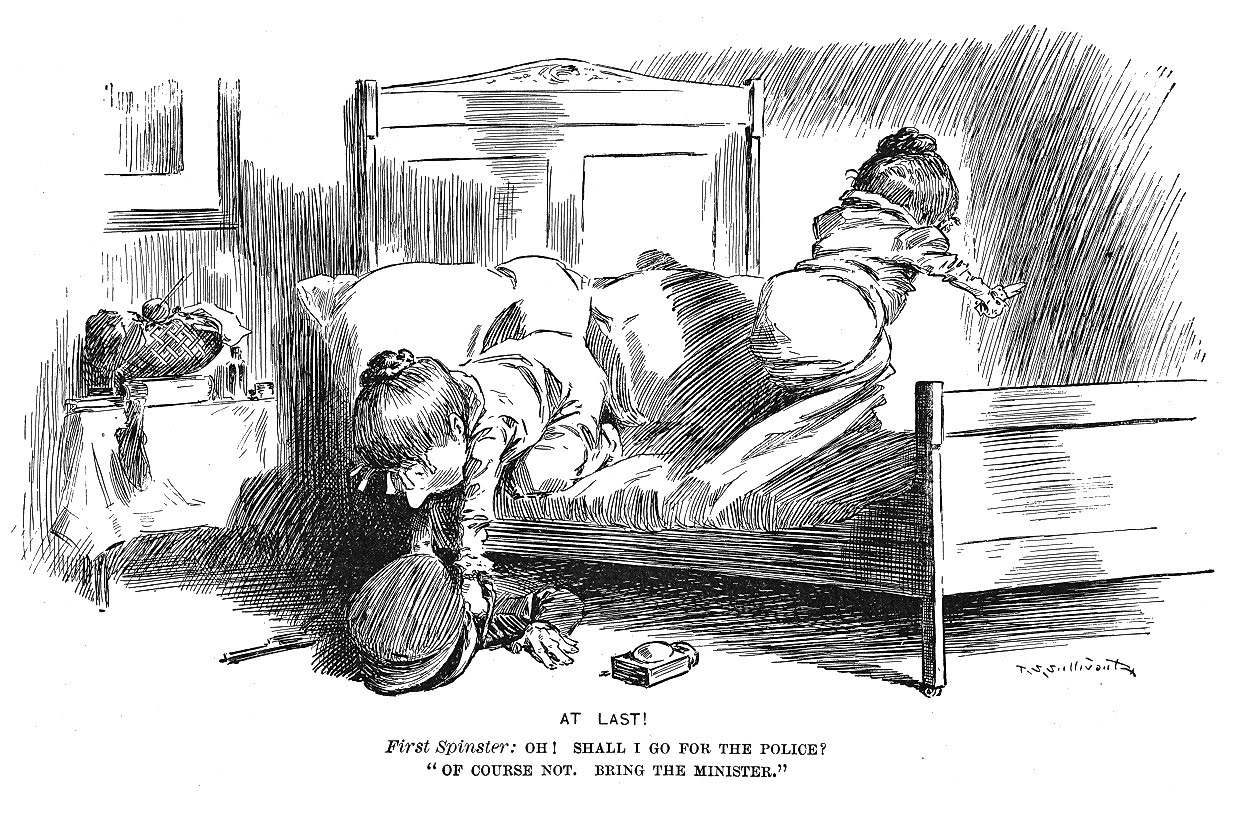

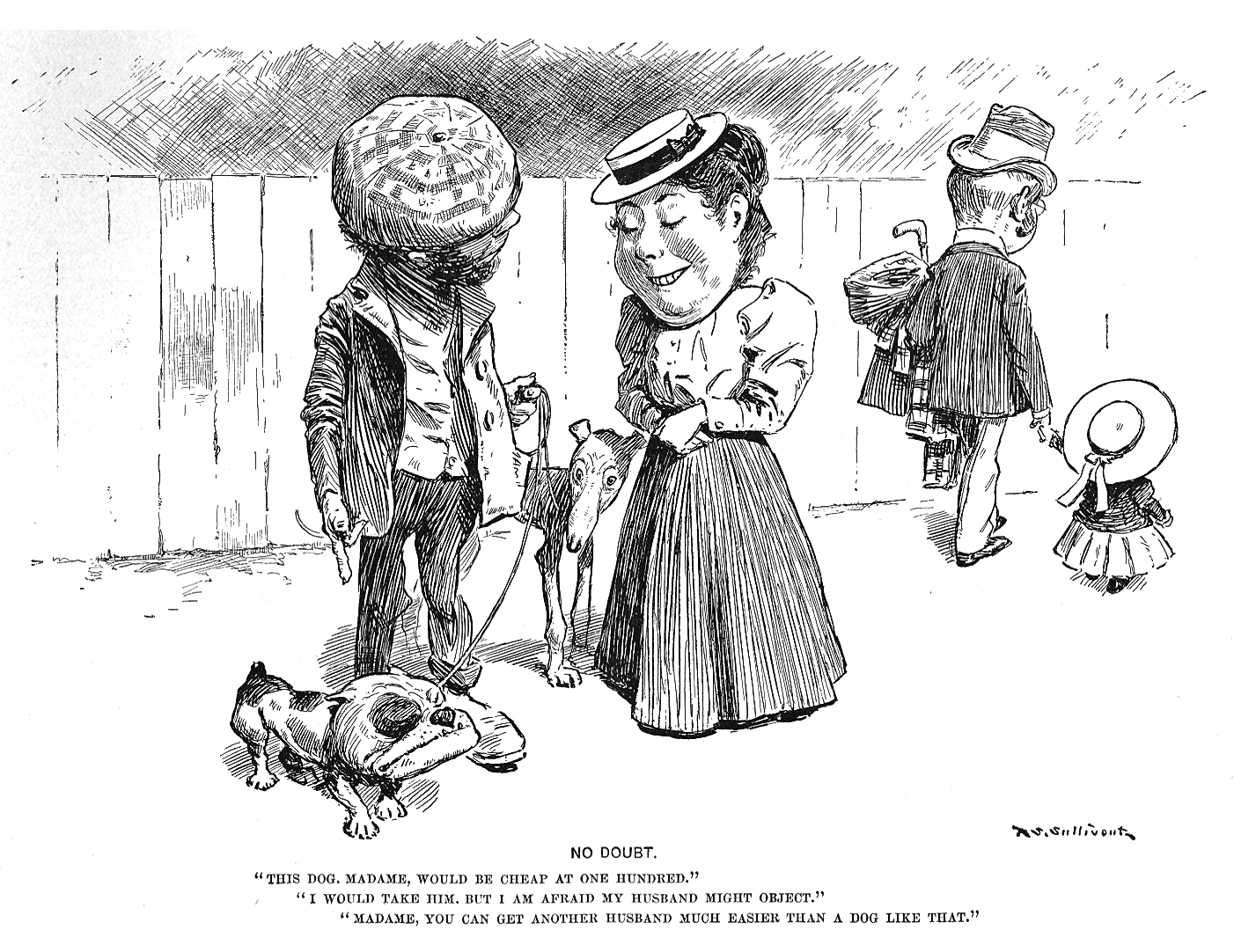

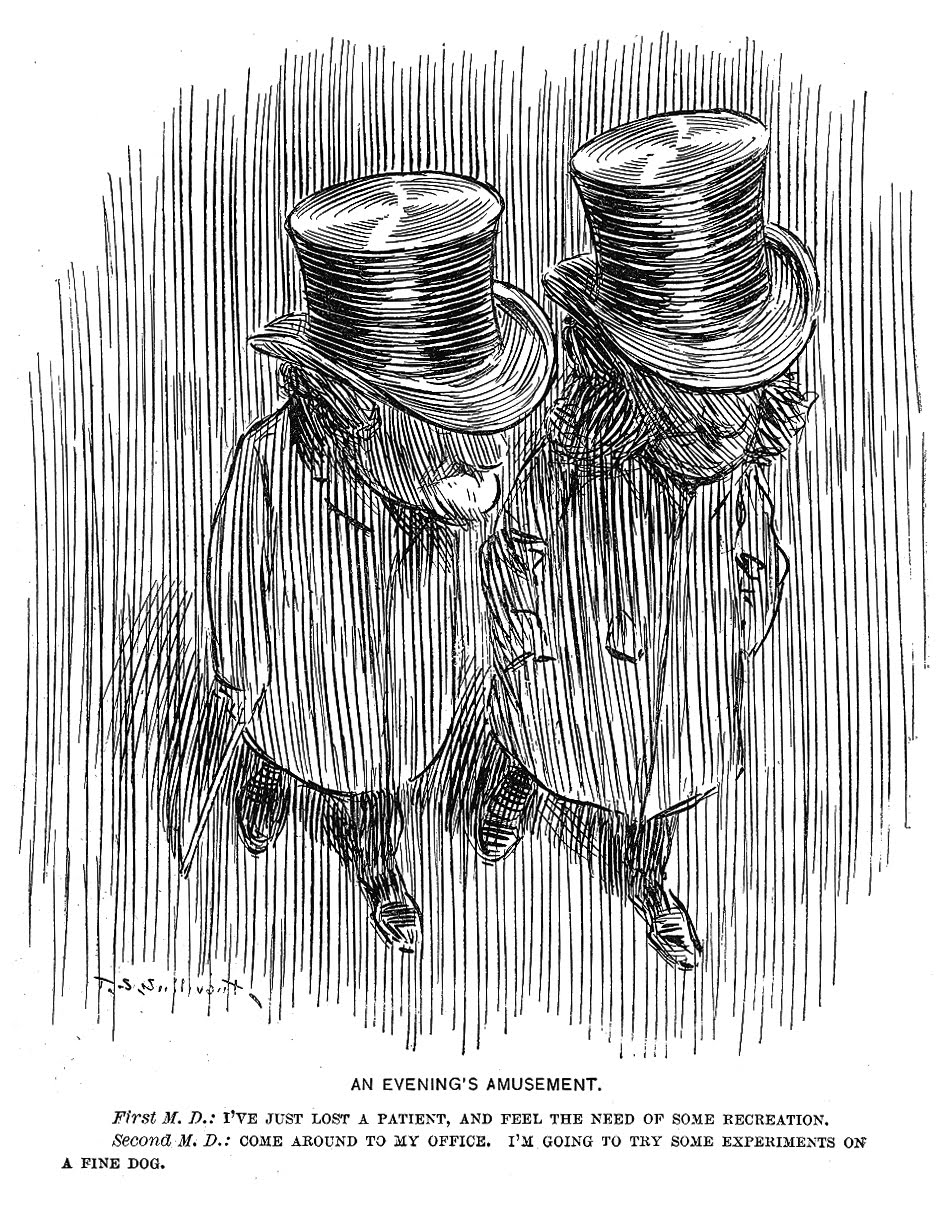

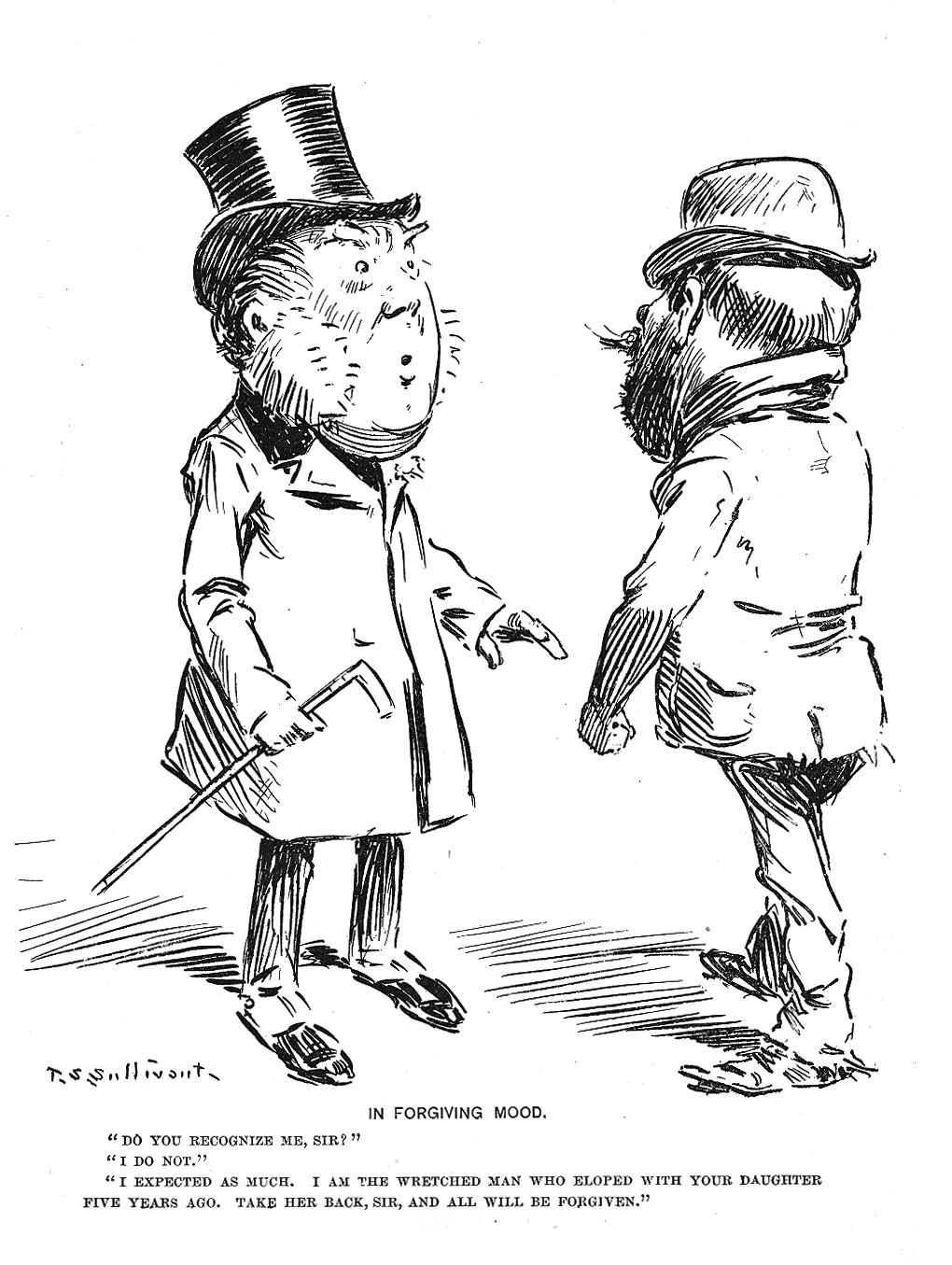

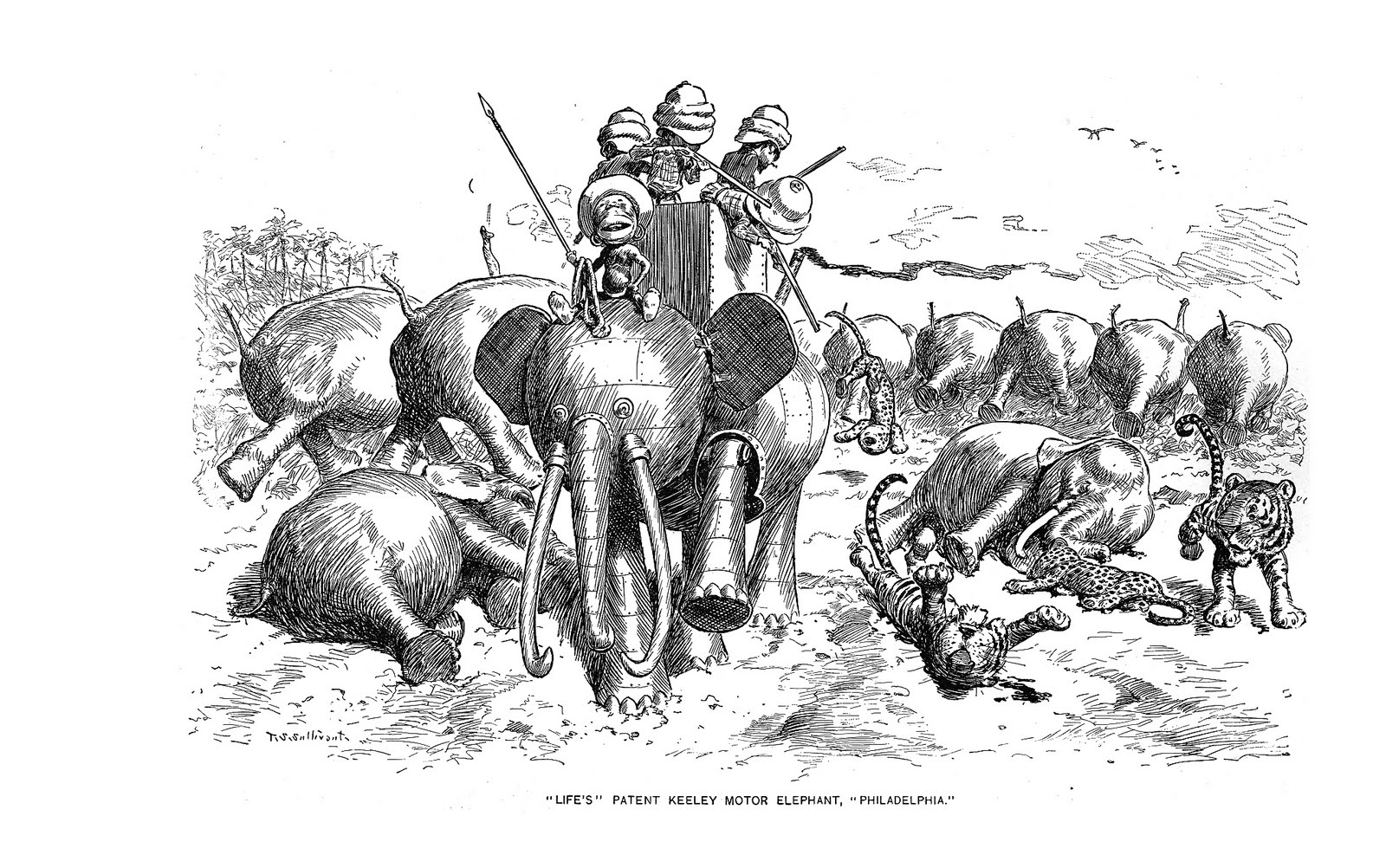

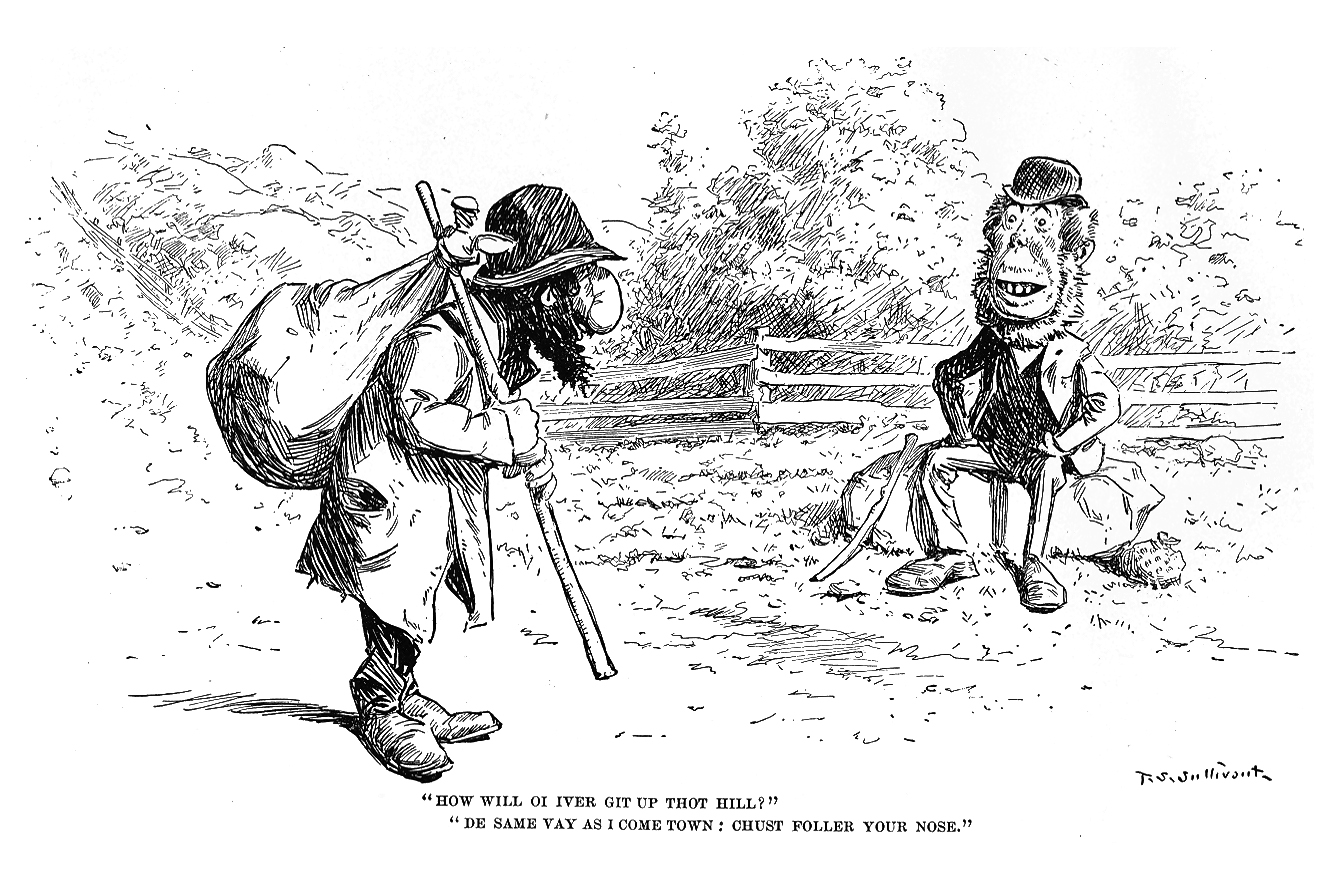

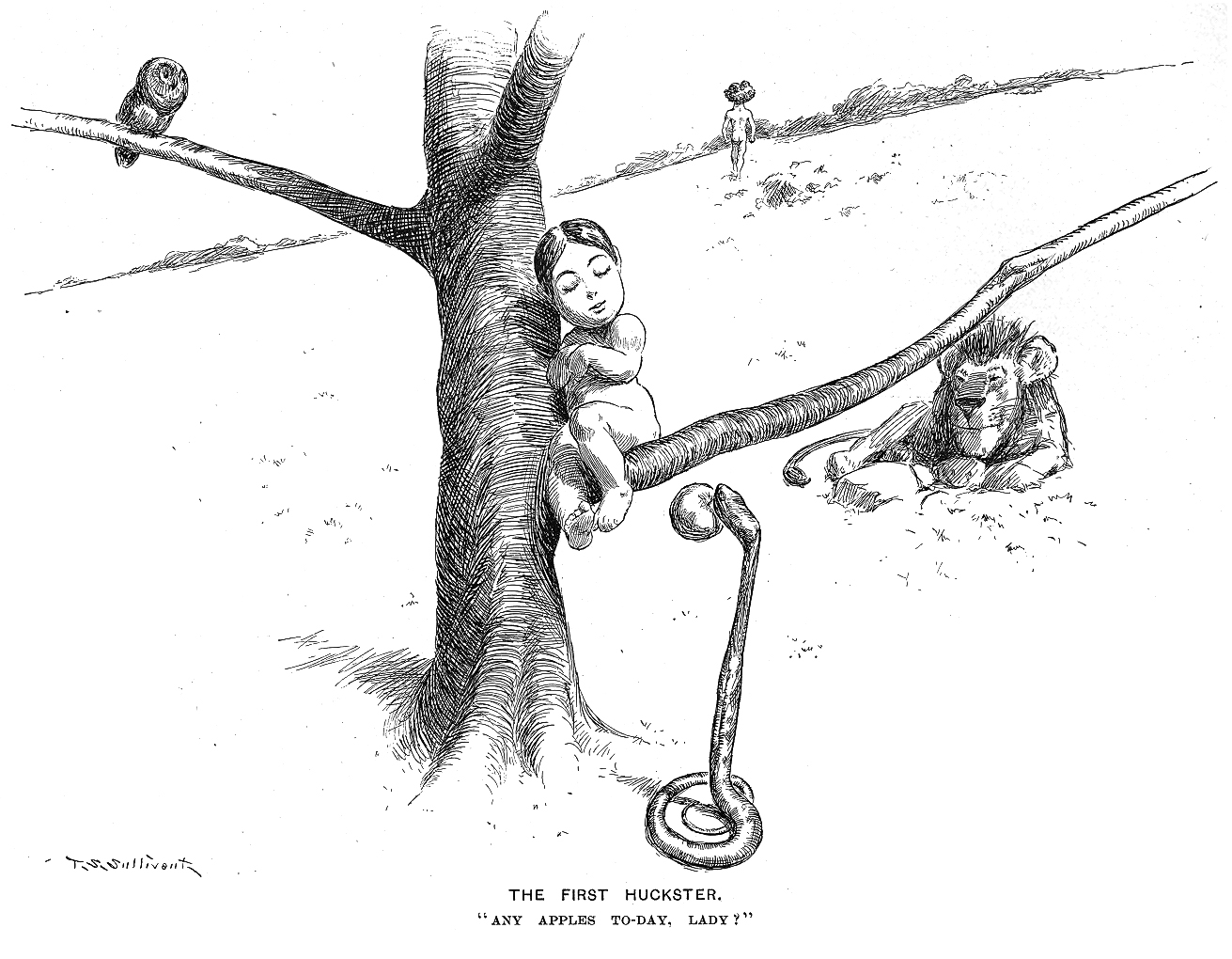

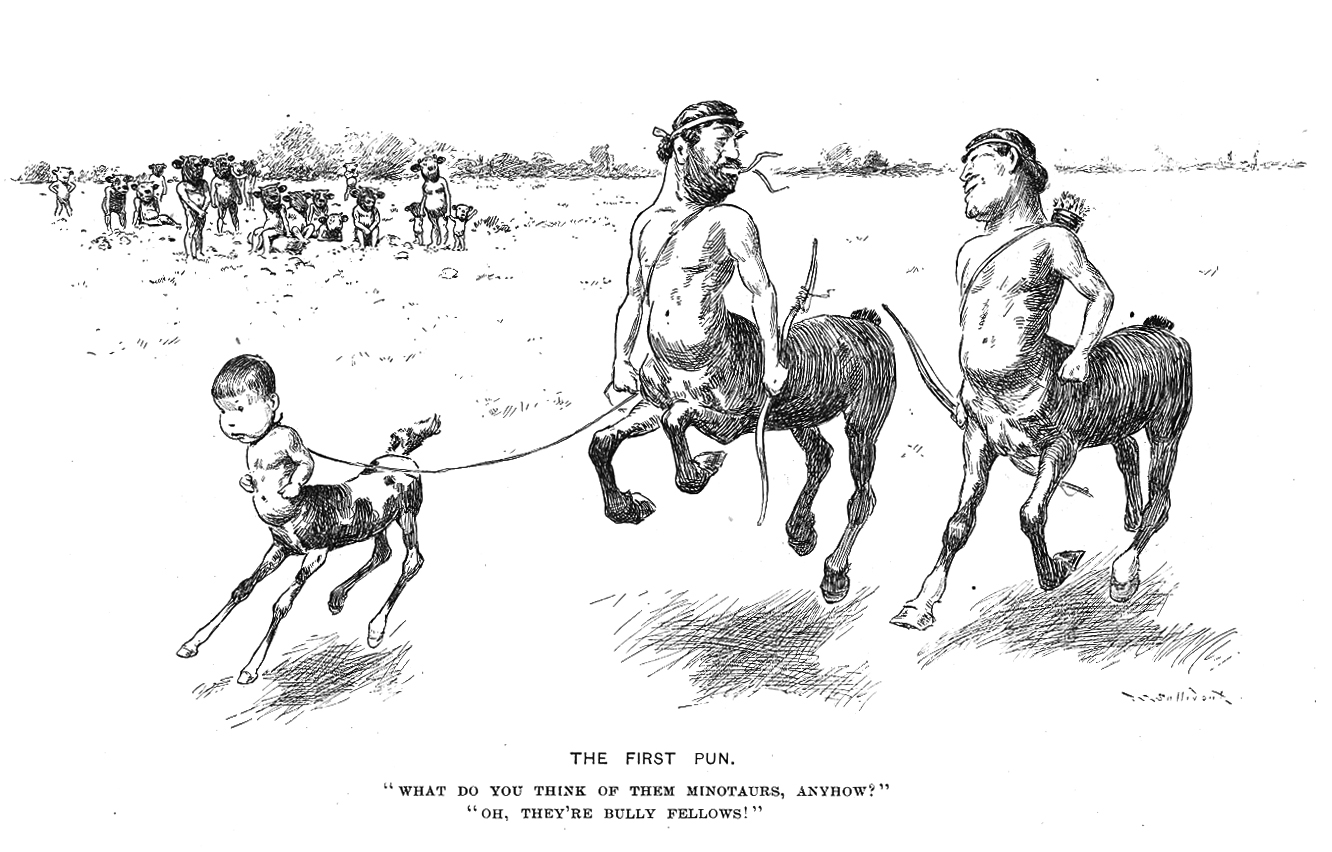
