= Thomas Starling =

Thomas Starling may refer to:

- Thomas Starling Sullivant, cartoonist
- Tom Starling, fictional character going under the alias Cass Cromwell in Outcasts (TV series)
