= Heartstrings (2009 film) =

- Directed by: Rhiannon Evans
- Produced by: University of Wales, Newport
- Music by: Gareth Bonello
- Release date: 2009
- Running time: 3 minutes
- Country: United Kingdom
- Budget: £500

Heartstrings is a 2009 British animated short film directed by Rhiannon Evans at the University of Wales in Newport. It tells us the story of two stop-motion figures made from string, who fall in love; their love is represented by a red string that connects them at the heart.

The film was made on a budget of £500 and took around four months to complete. In 2010 it was included on the Best of British Animation Awards Vol. 8 DVD.

== Accolades ==
- 2009: won the Best Animated Film Award at the Newport Graduate Showcase
- 2009: won the Best Student Film Award at the Norwich Film Festival
- 2009: won the Award for Second placed film at Canterbury Anifest
- 2009: won the Audience Selection Award at Canterbury Anifest
- 2009: won the Technical Achievement Award at Canterbury Anifest
- 2009: won the Animation Award at Exposures Film Festival
- 2009: won the Grand jury Award at Exposures Film Festival
- 2010: won the Best in Show Award at the Savannah International Animation Festival
- 2010: won the Best Student Film Award at the Savannah International Animation Festival
- 2010: won the Best Animation Award at Screentest Festival
- 2010: won the Audience Award at Screentest Festival
- 2010: won the Best Student: Undergraduate Individual Award at Stoke Your Fires

Nominations

- 2010: British Animation Award for Best Student Film
