= Peter Moran (painter) =

American etcher and painter (1841–1914)

Peter Moran (March 4, 1841 – November 9, 1914) was a British-born American painter and etcher. His siblings Thomas and Edward were also painters and his brother John was an important Philadelphia photographer. Peter Moran is best known as a printmaker during the etching revival of the 1880s.

== Biography ==
=== Early life and apprenticeship ===
Peter Moran was born in Bolton, Lancashire, the youngest of Mary (née Higson) and Thomas Moran Sr. He was a child when his parents and six siblings settled in Kensington, a suburb of Philadelphia. Three younger siblings were born after the family settled in Pennsylvania.

Moran began his career as an apprentice with the Philadelphia printing firm of Herline & Hensel and worked briefly as a lithographer. According to the United States Census of 1860, he also trained as a chair painter’s apprentice.

Peter Moran learned easel painting from his older brothers Edward and Thomas and traveled to England in 1863 to see the animal paintings of Edwin Landseer (1802-73). In 1867, he married the Irish-born Emily Kelly (1841-1903).

=== Career ===
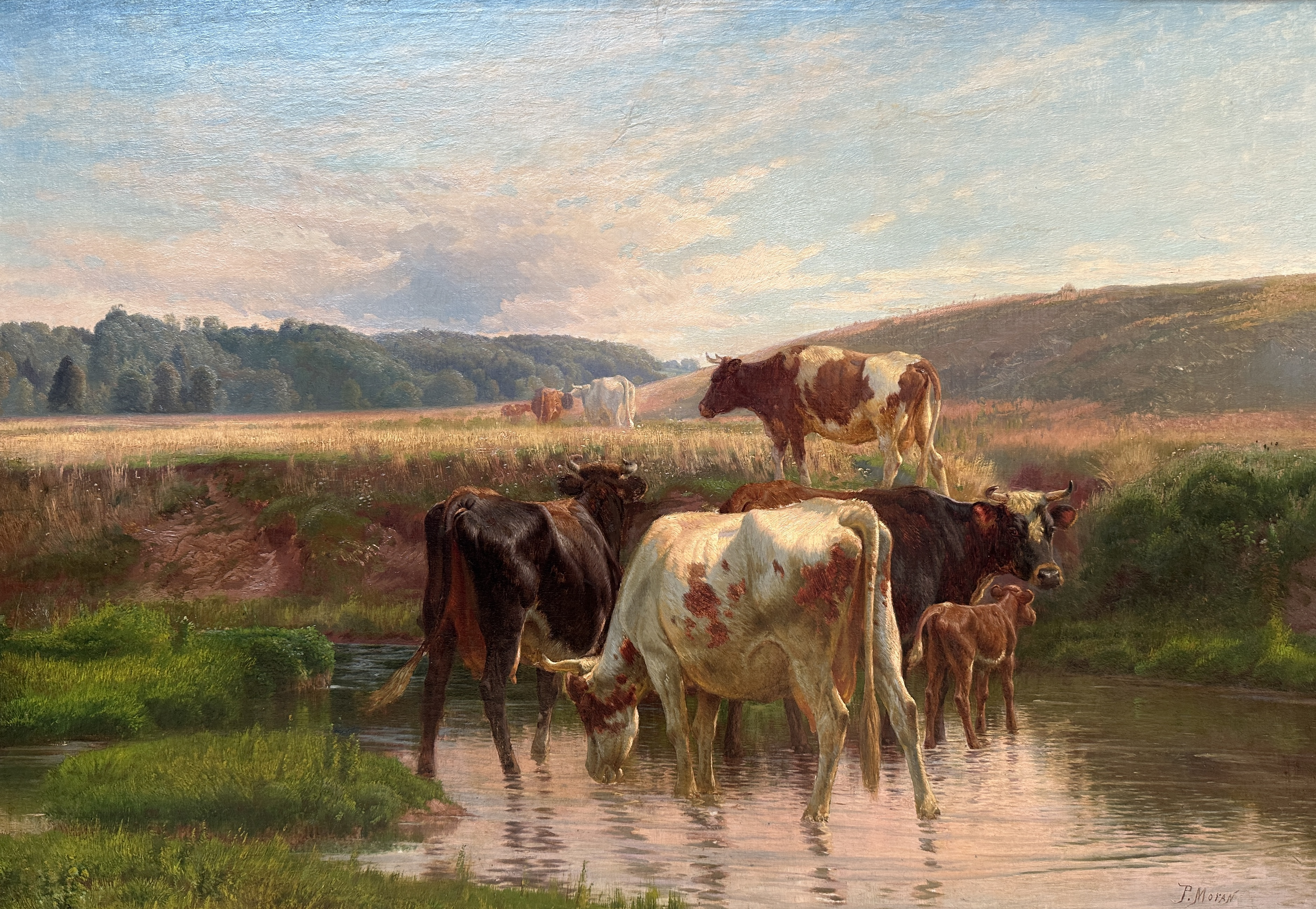
The Lowing Herd (1897), Washington County Museum of Fine Arts

A painter in watercolor as well as oil, Moran specialized in bucolic eastern landscapes with animals as well as images of life in New Mexico. Recent research indicates his first visit to New Mexico occurred in 1880 rather than 1864, as previously believed. Moran is best known for his work in etching, and he was a leader in Philadelphia’s etching revival of the 1880s. The first exhibition of the Philadelphia Society of Etchers, held in the winter of 1882-83, included prints by him and by other members of his family. Moran’s wife Emily Kelley Moran was also an etcher and painter.

Of the four artist brothers, Peter Moran was the most active in Philadelphia’s growing art world. He was a member at various times of the Philadelphia Sketch Club, the Philadelphia Society of Artists, and the Art Union of Philadelphia. In 1880, he founded the Philadelphia Society of Etchers with his brother-in-law Stephen James Ferris (1835-1915) and the artist Joseph Pennell (1857-1926). Moran served as president of the Society of Etchers until 1903. In 1887, he was a founding member of the Art Club of Philadelphia.

=== Teaching ===
Peter Moran also had a long career as a teacher. He began in 1866 as a lecturer at the Philadelphia School of Design for Women (now Moore College of Art and Design). His brother Thomas and his brother-in-law Stephen Ferris had participated in a lecture series at the School of Design the previous year. Ferris continued his affiliation with the School of Design for nearly twenty-five years, teaching figure drawing and painting from live models and plaster casts of statues. Peter Moran’s teaching career lasted thirty years: after his start as a lecturer in 1866, he was hired full-time in 1872 and taught etching as well as landscape painting in oil and watercolor until 1896.

=== Death ===
Moran died on November 9, 1914. He was buried next to his wife in West Laurel Hill Cemetery in Bala Cynwyd, Pennsylvania.
