= Edward Percy Moran =

American artist (1862–1935)

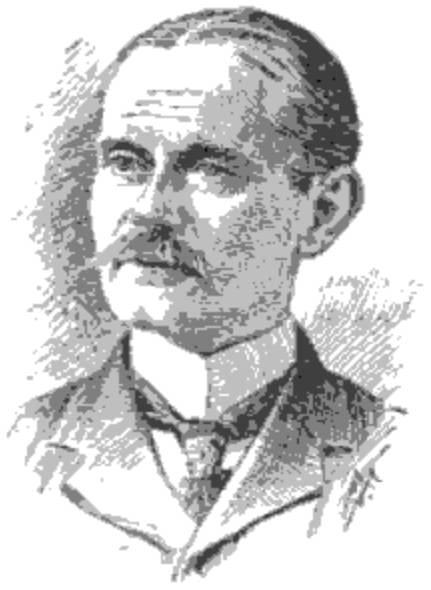
- Born: July 29, 1862; Philadelphia, Pennsylvania, U.S.
- Died: March 25, 1935 (aged 72); New York City, U.S.
- Education: Pennsylvania Academy of Fine Arts; National Academy of Design
- Known for: Painting
- Awards: First Hallgarten Prize (1886)

Edward Percy Moran (1862–1935), sometimes known as Percy Moran, was an American artist known for his scenes of American history.

== Early life and education ==
He was born in Philadelphia on July 29, 1862, to Edward Moran, an artist who immigrated to the United States from England.

Moran studied under his father and at the Pennsylvania Academy of the Fine Arts in Philadelphia and the National Academy of Design in New York City.

== Career ==
He was a painter of historical American subjects, and examples of his work are found in many prominent collections.

== Death ==
He died in New York City on March 25, 1935, at age 72.

His brother Leon Moran (born 1864), his uncles Peter Moran (born 1842) and Thomas Moran, and his cousin Jean Leon Gerome Ferris were also prominent American artists.

== Images ==
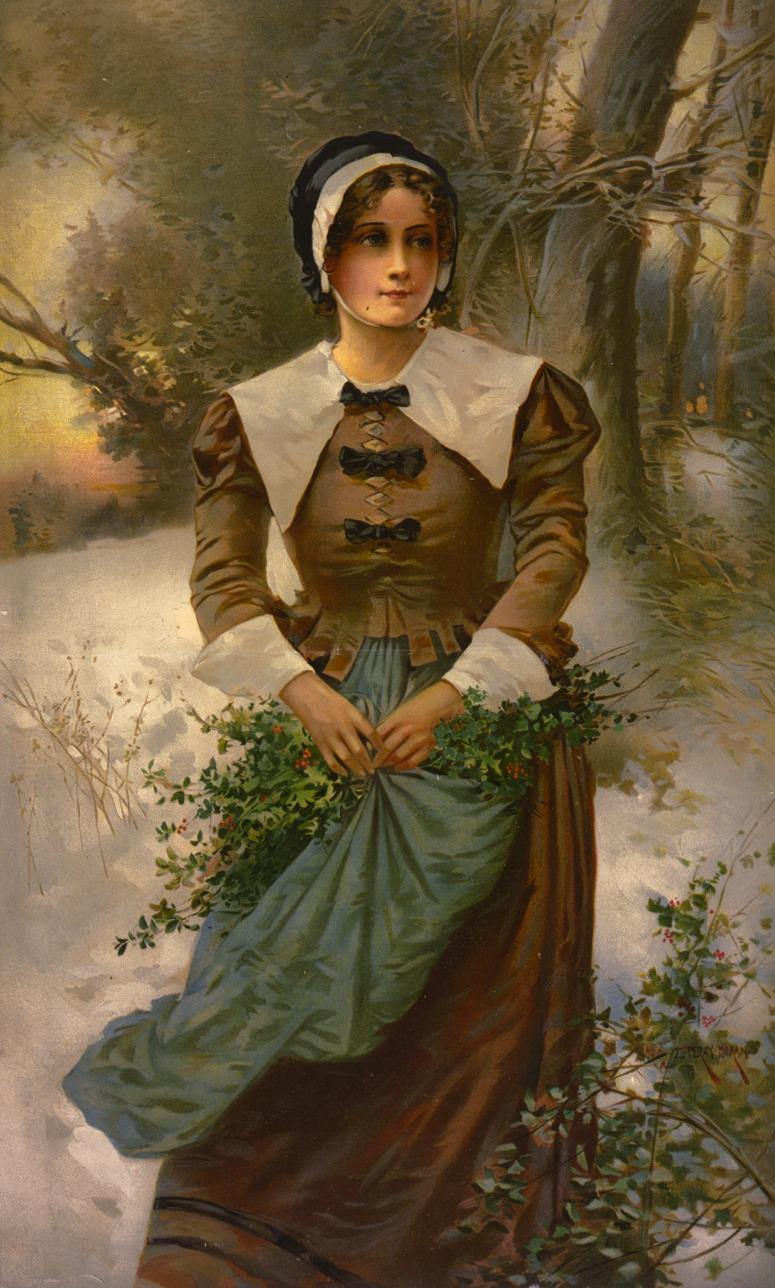
A Fair Puritan

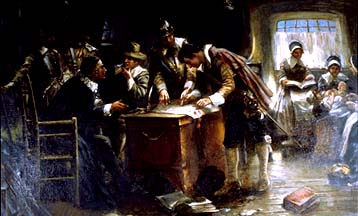
Signing the Mayflower Compact, ca. 1900, now in the collection of the Pilgrim Hall Museum

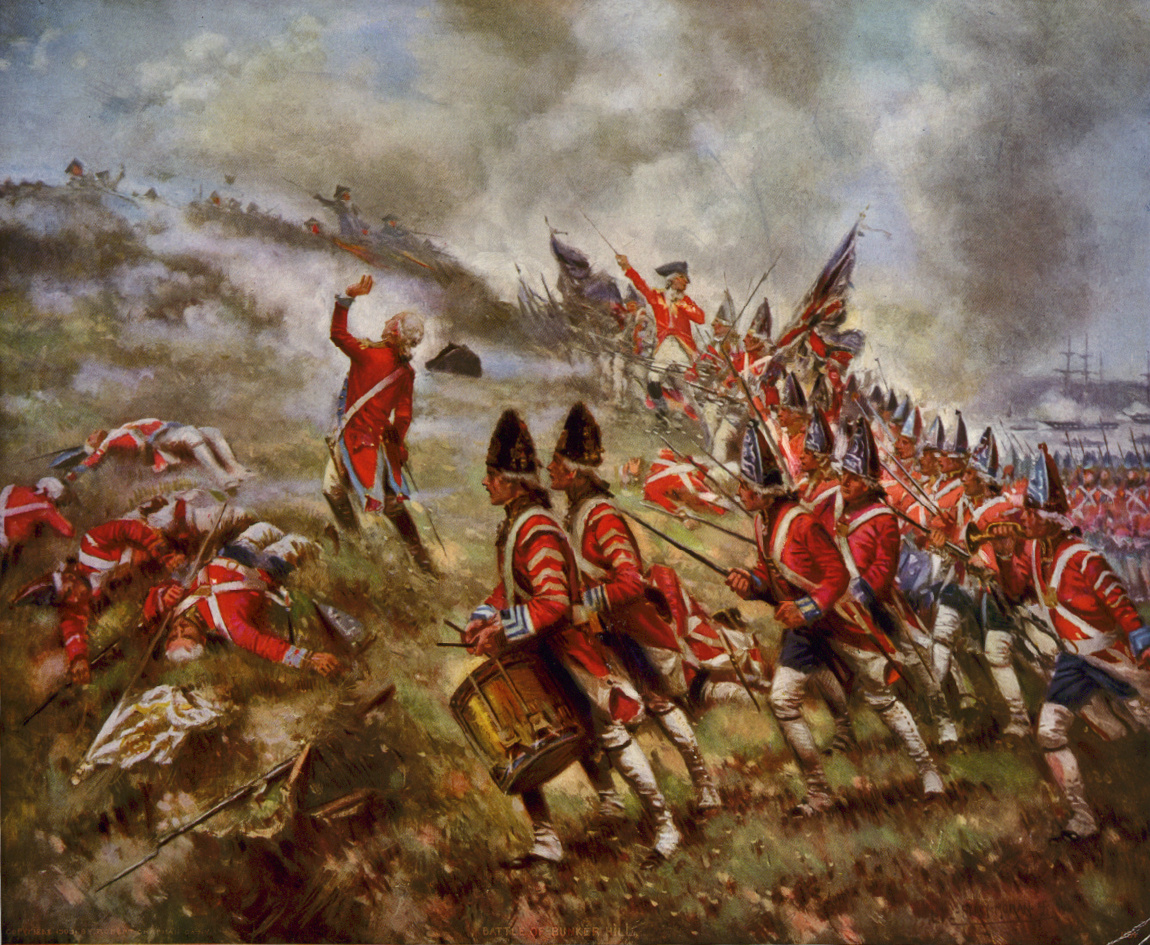
Battle of Bunker Hill

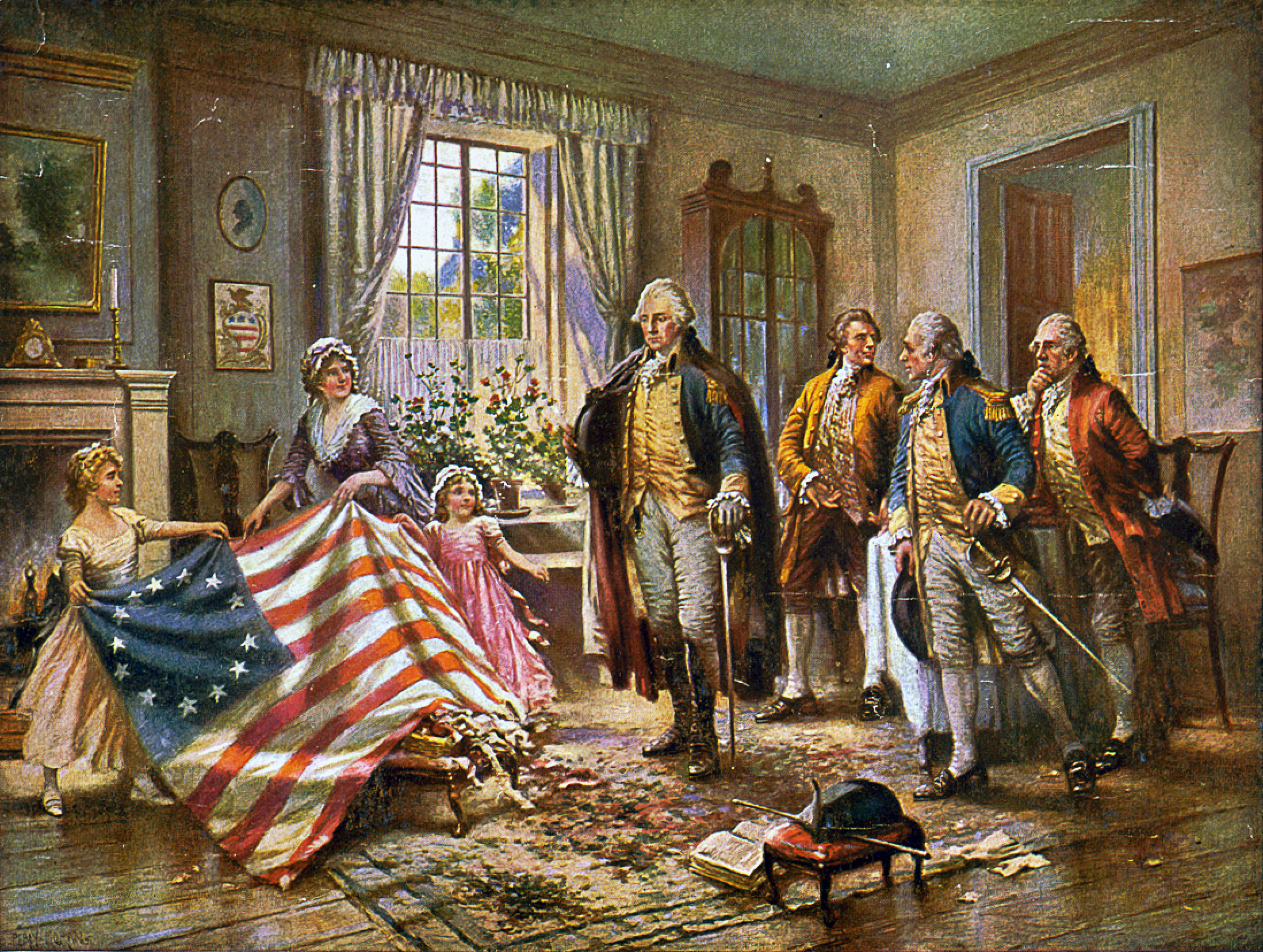
The Birth of Old Glory (1917)

George Washington's Farewell Address

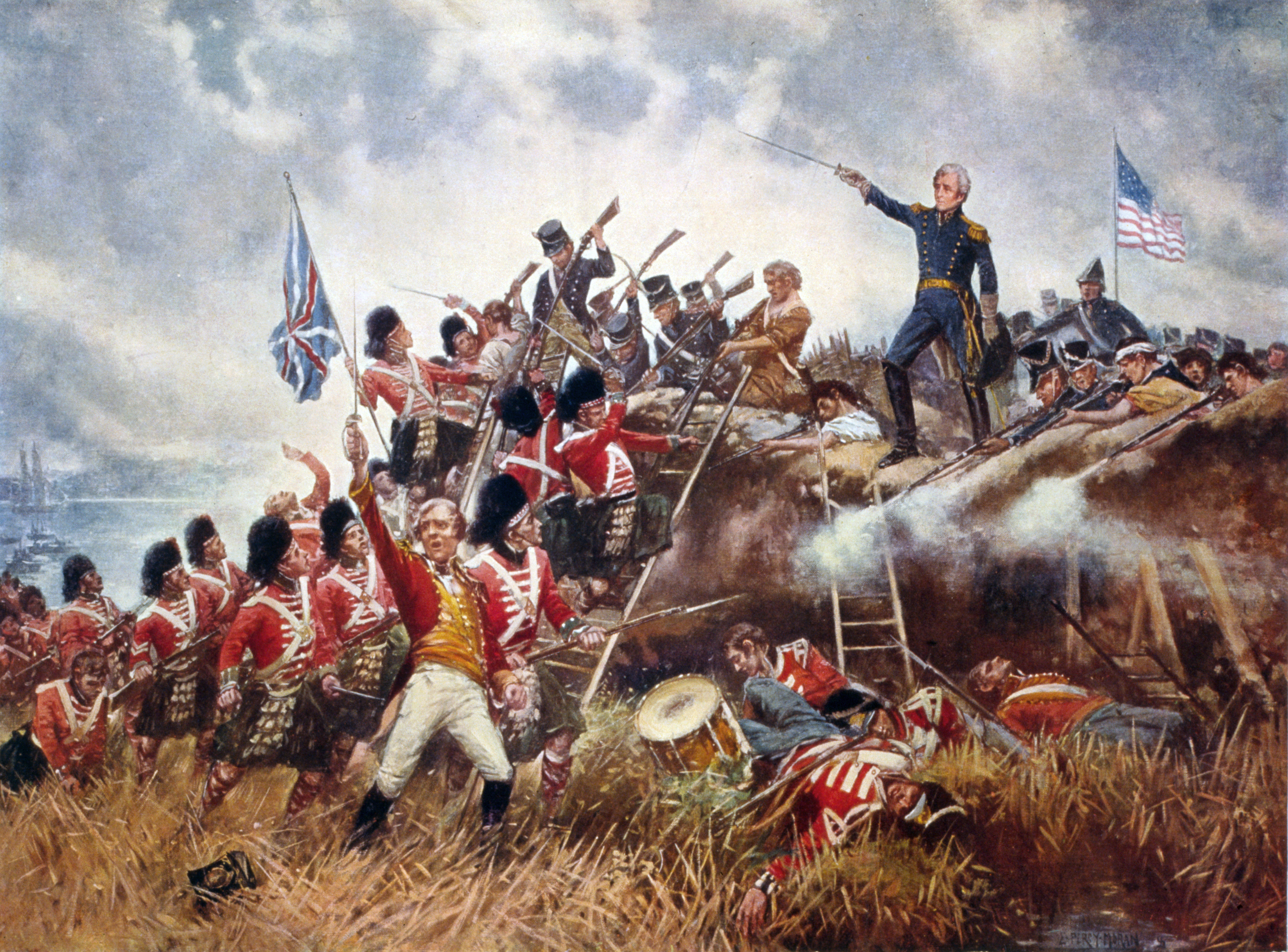
Battle of New Orleans (1910). Held in the Library of Congress
