= Nancy Beiman =

Canadian animator and professor

Nancy Beiman is a director, character designer, teacher, animator, author and comic strip creator. She attended the Character Animation program at CalArts.

== Career ==
=== Comic strips ===
Nancy Beiman's first comic strip FurBabies was accepted by Andrews McMeel Universal on its first submission and can be viewed online on the GoComics site. It first appeared on June 5, 2023, and is updated daily. FurBabies is about a blended family of dogs, cat and human who all speak with one another and deal with issues such as frequency of baths, sibling rivalry, and whether food tastes better when eaten at the table or off the floor. Shawm the Afghan hound is named after an oboe, and is partly based on Beiman's father, who was a professional oboist. Stella the Poodle is based on a cat, while Sirius the puppy and Kate the human child are composites of children (and one puppy) Beiman knew in real life.

=== Animation ===
In 1986, Beiman cofounded Caged Beagle Productions with business partner Dean Yeagle. She then moved to Berlin, Germany where she directed and animated for Gerhard Hahn Film Productions. She was an animator on Daffy Duck's Quackbusters (1988). In 1989, she was a supervising animator at Steven Spielberg's Amblin' studio in London animating Miss Kitty in the feature film An American Tail: Fievel Goes West.

Beiman animated Mickey Mouse, Donald Duck, and Winnie the Pooh for many Disney projects beginning in 1982. She joined the Walt Disney Company full time as a supervising animator and development artist for A Goofy Movie (1995), Hercules (1997), Treasure Planet (2002), Tarzan II (2005).

Her interviews with animation artists appeared in Cartoonist Profiles magazine from 1982 to 1995.

=== Teaching ===
Beiman taught storyboard at Sheridan College's Animation department in Canada from 2008 to 2018. Beiman previously taught animation at Savannah College of Art and Design, and taught animation, character design, layout, storyboard and gesture drawing at Rochester Institute of Technology, School of Film & Animation from 2004 to 2008. Beiman retired in 2022.

=== Books ===
Beiman is the author of two books on animation acting and storyboarding: Animated Performance. and Prepare to Board!. In 2022, she published a book of autobiographical comics about her life during COVID, How I Finally Got to Live a Cat's Life: A Cartoon Diary 2020-2021.

- Beiman, Nancy (2022). How I Finally Got to Live a Cat's Life: A Cartoon Diary 2020-2021. Toronto: Nancy Beiman. ISBN 978-0986770029.

- Beiman, Nancy (2021). Animated Performance: Bringing Imaginary Animal, Human and Fantasy Characters to Life (2nd ed.). New York: Bloomsbury Academic. ISBN 978-1501376672.

- Beiman, Nancy (2017). Prepare to Board! Creating Story and Characters for Animated Features and Shorts: Creating Story and Characters for Animated Features and Shorts (3rd ed.). New York: CRC Press. ISBN 978-1498797009.

=== Awards ===
In 1984 she was awarded with the NCS Division Award in the field of Feature Animation. In 2000, she was nominated the Annie Award for Outstanding Individual Achievement for Storyboarding in an Animated Television Production. Beiman was also awarded a Golden Pencil for outstanding teaching at the 2D Or Not 2D Animation Festival in 2007.
