= Kalamazoo Animation Festival International =

Animation film festivals in the United States

The Kalamazoo Animation Festival International (KAFI) is an organization that encourages and educates animation artists, promotes Kalamazoo's animation industry, and provides community entertainment. KAFI is a project of Kalamazoo Valley Community College. In addition to a biannual festival, KAFI sponsors events such as film screenings and workshops throughout the year.

== Festival ==
KAFI's first festival, spearheaded by a local animation artist, drew 235 submissions and nearly 1,000 attendees in 2002. A second festival was held in 2003. Since then, an every-other-year schedule has been adopted, and KAFI has developed into one of the top 20 animated film festivals in the world. The 2007 festival attracted over 500 entries from 37 countries. In addition to an animated film competition with $15,000 in prizes awarded, the festival features events for students, artists, educators, filmmakers and the general public. Past KAFI award winners include Bill Plympton, Karen Aqua, Chris Landreth and John Canemaker.

The last festival was held in 2009.
