= John Moran (photographer) =

British born American photographer (1831-1902)

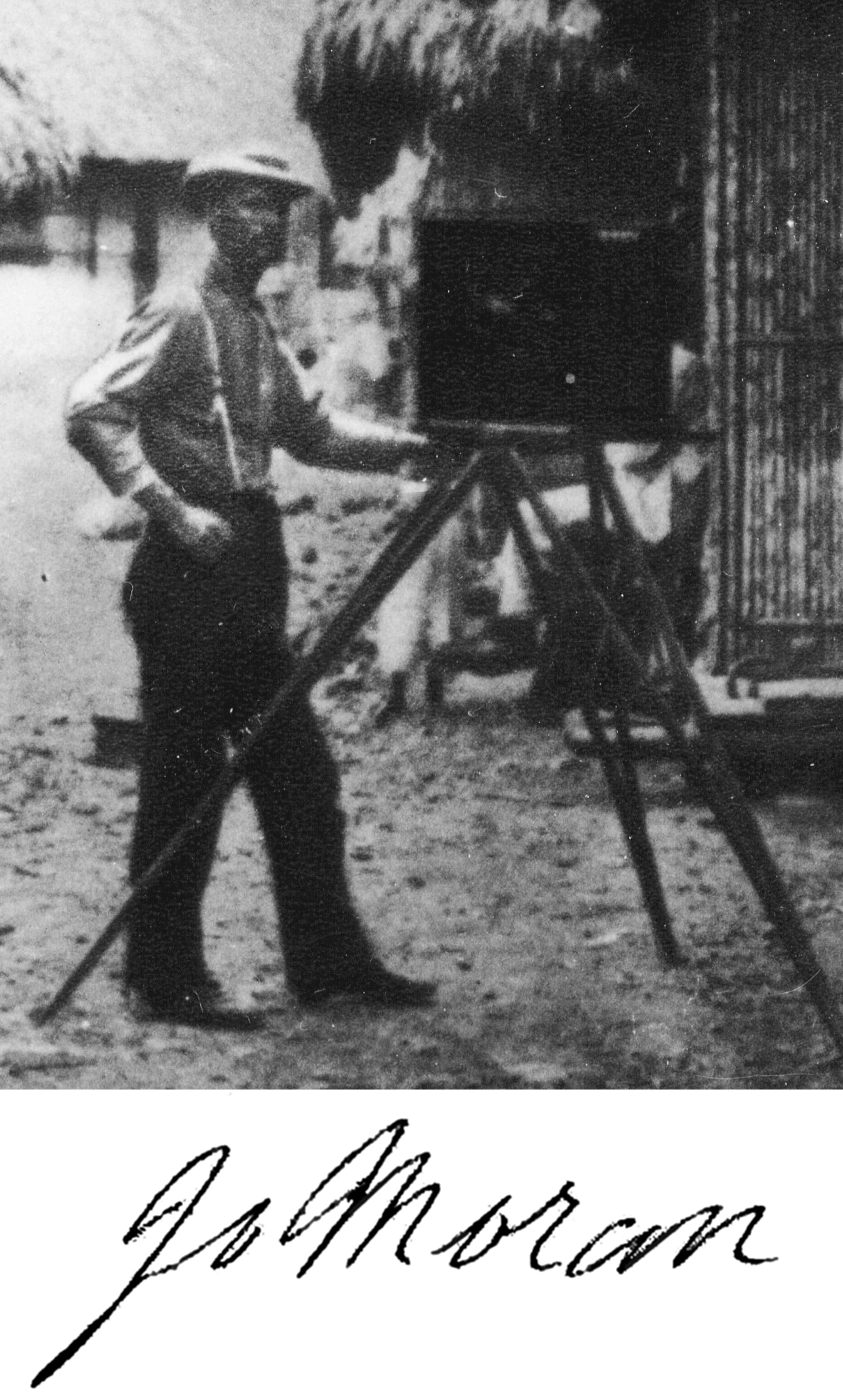
- Photograph and signature of John Moran
- Born: February 1831; Bolton le Moors, Lancashire, England
- Died: February 19, 1902 (aged 70–71); Manhattan, New York City, N.Y., U.S.
- Occupations: Photographer, artist

John Moran (February 1831 – February 19, 1902) was a pioneering American photographer and artist. Moran was a prominent landscape, architectural, astronomical and expedition photographer whose career began in the Philadelphia, Pennsylvania area during the 1860s.

A brother of the painters Thomas, Edward and Peter Moran, Moran was a member of a network of Philadelphia-based artists, historians, and scientists who recognized photography as a fine art in the years before the American Civil War.

== Biography ==
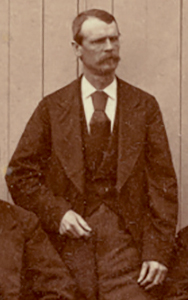
John Moran at Harbor Town, Tasmania, December 1874 while leader of the US Transit of Venus Expedition

John Moran was born during February 1831 at Bolton le Moors, Lancashire, England, the third of Mary (née Higson) and Thomas Moran's eight children.

At the age of 13, he arrived in Philadelphia, Pennsylvania on the passenger ship Thomas on May 31, 1844, having traveled with his mother and then six siblings.

Moran was the one photographer among his accomplished siblings. Brothers Thomas, Edward and Peter trained as lithographers and became painters. Moran's sister Elizabeth married an artist and her two children became painters.

By the early 1890s, Moran resumed painting, joining his brothers Edward and Thomas in New York City where he wrote about art and exhibited his paintings. A widower, living with his son Thomas Sidney Moran, he died there in 1902.

Moran's 1902 obituary in The New York Times mentioned Moran's role as "one of the pioneer photographers of this country".

== Advocate of photography as an artistic medium ==
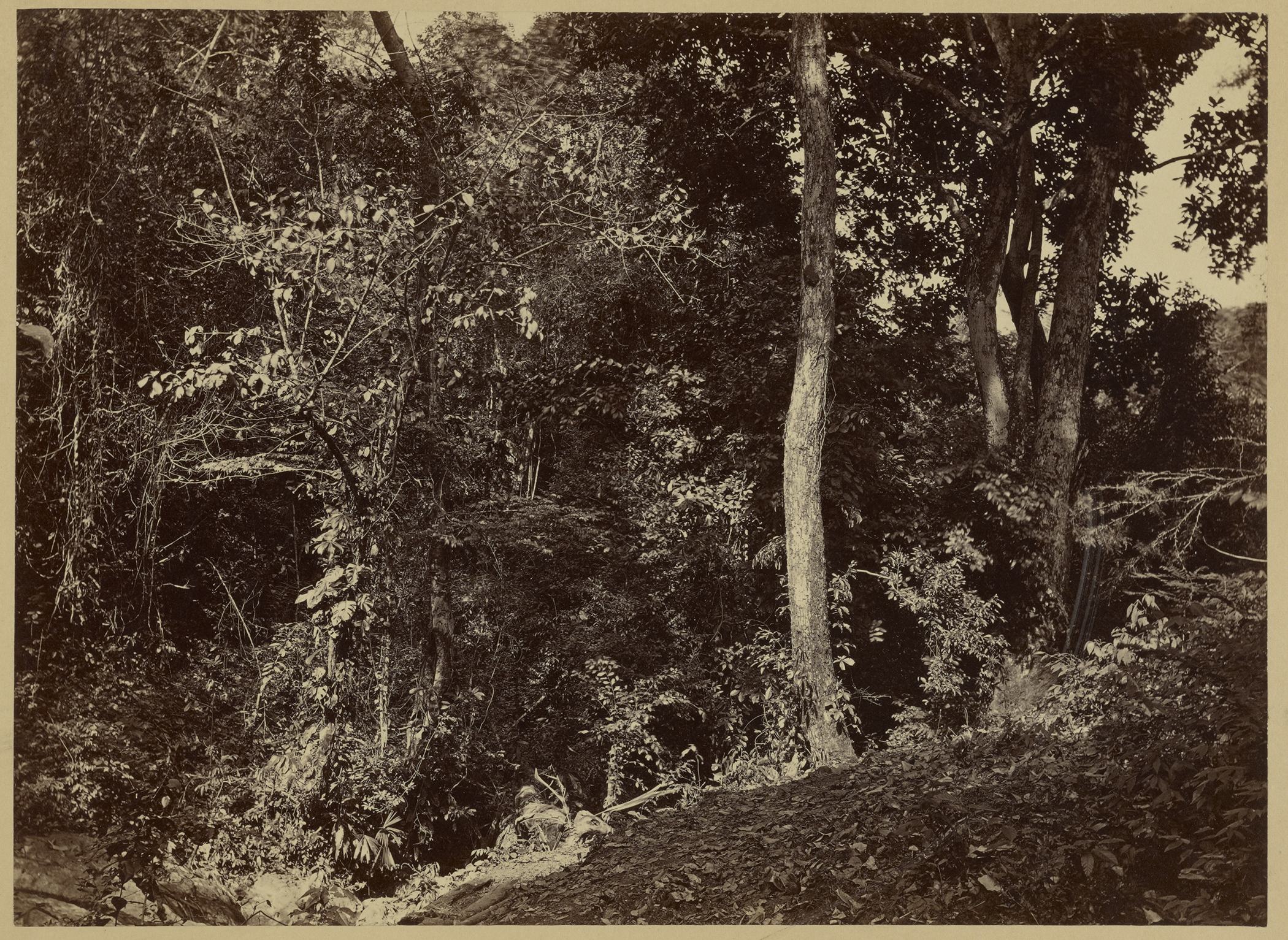
John Moran, View near Chipigana, 1871, Albumen silver print - Digital image courtesy of the Getty's Open Content Program

In the 1850s, Moran was a pioneer in advancing photography as a medium of artistic expression. Moran said, "In photography, as in any work of art, the merit lies, in the power of seeing and deciding what shall be done...It is this knowledge, or art of seeing which gives value and importance to the works of certain photographers over others. There are hundreds who make, chemically, faultless photographs, but few make pictures..."

Moran understood photography could achieve more than merely recording a moment, saying in 1865 "She (photography) can present imagery with a reality and force nearly rivaling the painter, and in some respects, superior." “But it is the power of seeing and deciding what shall be done, on which will depend the value and importance of any work, whether canvas or negative.”

Moran said "Art in all its forms is the form of thought, and the photographic work which rises to this plane is the expression of the ideas of the photographer. Nature... becomes plastic to his touch, and he moulds her to his judgment through (the photographer's) power to see the beautiful."

== Pioneer artistic photographer ==
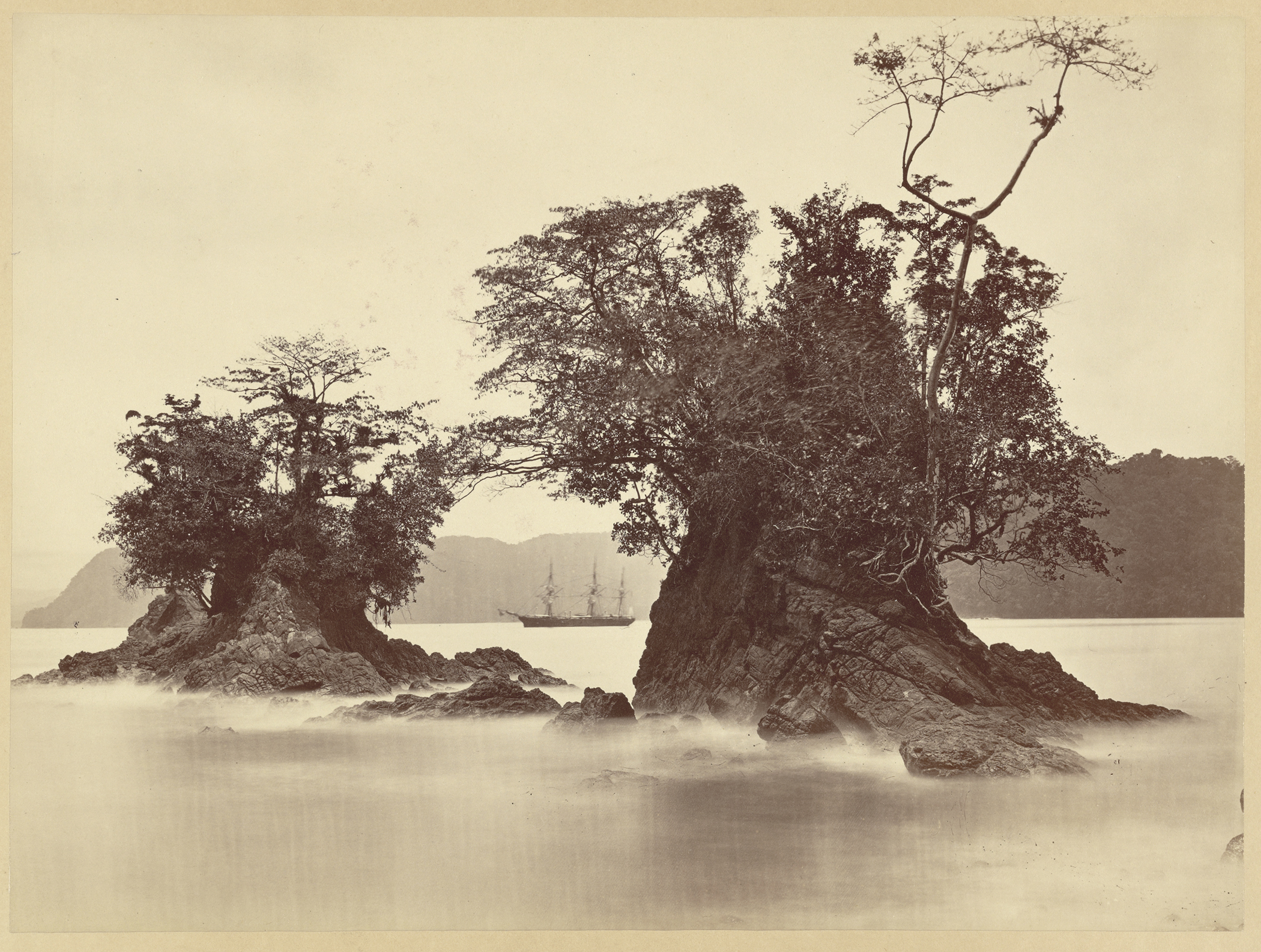
Moran's Limon Bay, High Tide, 1871

Moran is listed in local Philadelphia directories as a lithographer in 1856, occasionally listing his profession as artist. He was first listed as a photographer in the 1859 edition of Mc'Elroy’s Philadelphia City Directory, for 1859. He appears in city directories as a photographer from 1860 through 1885.

Moran was an early advocate of photography as art. Several of his albumen silver print landscape photographs appeared as frontispieces in Wilson's Philadelphia Photographer in 1864.

Moran often created photographic images working alongside his brother Thomas as his brother painted the same subject view. Moran's photographs were images that balanced meticulous attention to detail with general atmospheric effects — techniques mirrored in his brother's paintings. Moran often included a human subject in his images, providing the viewer an easily relatable sense of scale.

It is felt Moran was a humanistic, Arcadian photographer, employing his photographs of nature in a metaphorical way. The National Gallery of Art (US) said in 2016: "It is thought John Moran photographed "Wissahickon Creek near Philadelphia" (c. 1863) as an antidote to Civil War."

Moran was mentioned often in the photographic press in America and Europe for both the aesthetic and technical quality of his photographs, and his theories on the medium.

In addition to single photographic views, Moran also photographed many stereoscope photographs. Moran's images were printed on stereographic cards that were widely distributed and viewed using the newly developed stereograph.

=== Mower General Hospital ===
Moran created a photographic catalog of Mower General Hospital also known as Chestnut Hill Hospital for a series that he published for sale. Moran's photos were issued as both mounted photographs and stereographs soon after the facility was completed.

The hospital, a major military facility, was built in 1862 on a lot of 27 acres, situated between Stenton, Germantown, Springfield and Abington avenues in Philadelphia's Chestnut Hill. Moran photographed a series of views of the hospital's innovatively-designed circular layout. Moran's exterior and interior views included photos of special medical wards that could be isolated for patients with infections and then novel centralized storage facilities for supplies.

== Pioneer scientific photographer ==
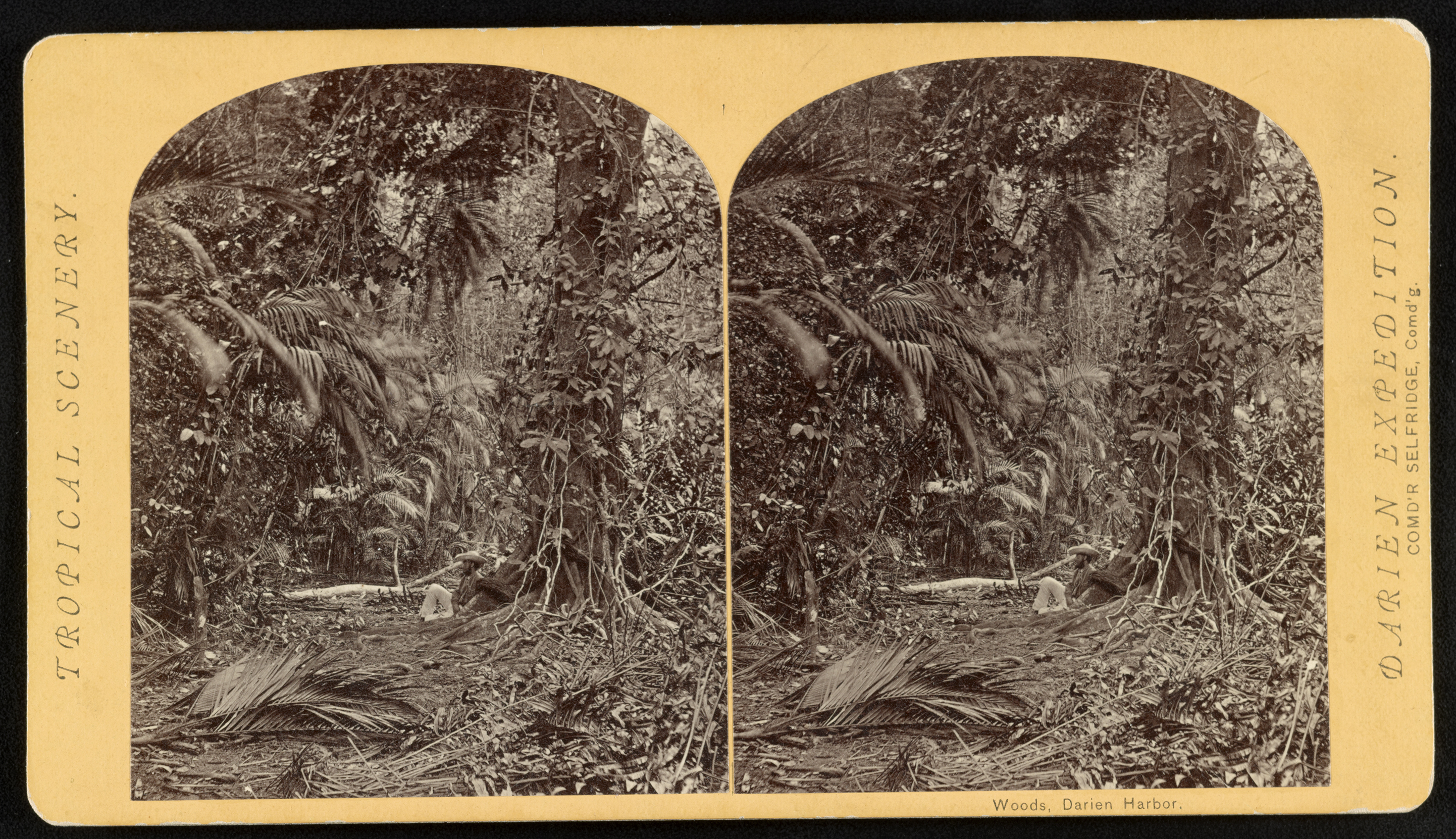
A stereograph showing a man sitting at the base of a tree in a tropical rain forest taken by Moran at Woods, Darién Gap, Panama, 1871

In addition to using photography as an artistic medium, Moran was recruited and hired as a photographer documenting scientific projects for the U.S. government. One of those projects, according to his obituary in The New York Times, was his role as the photographer "in charge of the Coast Survey.

=== Isthmus of Panama Expedition of 1871 ===
In 1871, Moran was hired as the official photographer during the second survey to the Isthmus of Darien in Panama, led by US Navy Commodore Thomas Oliver Selfridge Jr. to determine the best route for a canal across the isthmus. Moran documented the trip with numerous still photographs, including many stereographs which were widely reproduced and sold throughout the world.

=== Transit of Venus photographic expedition of 1874 ===
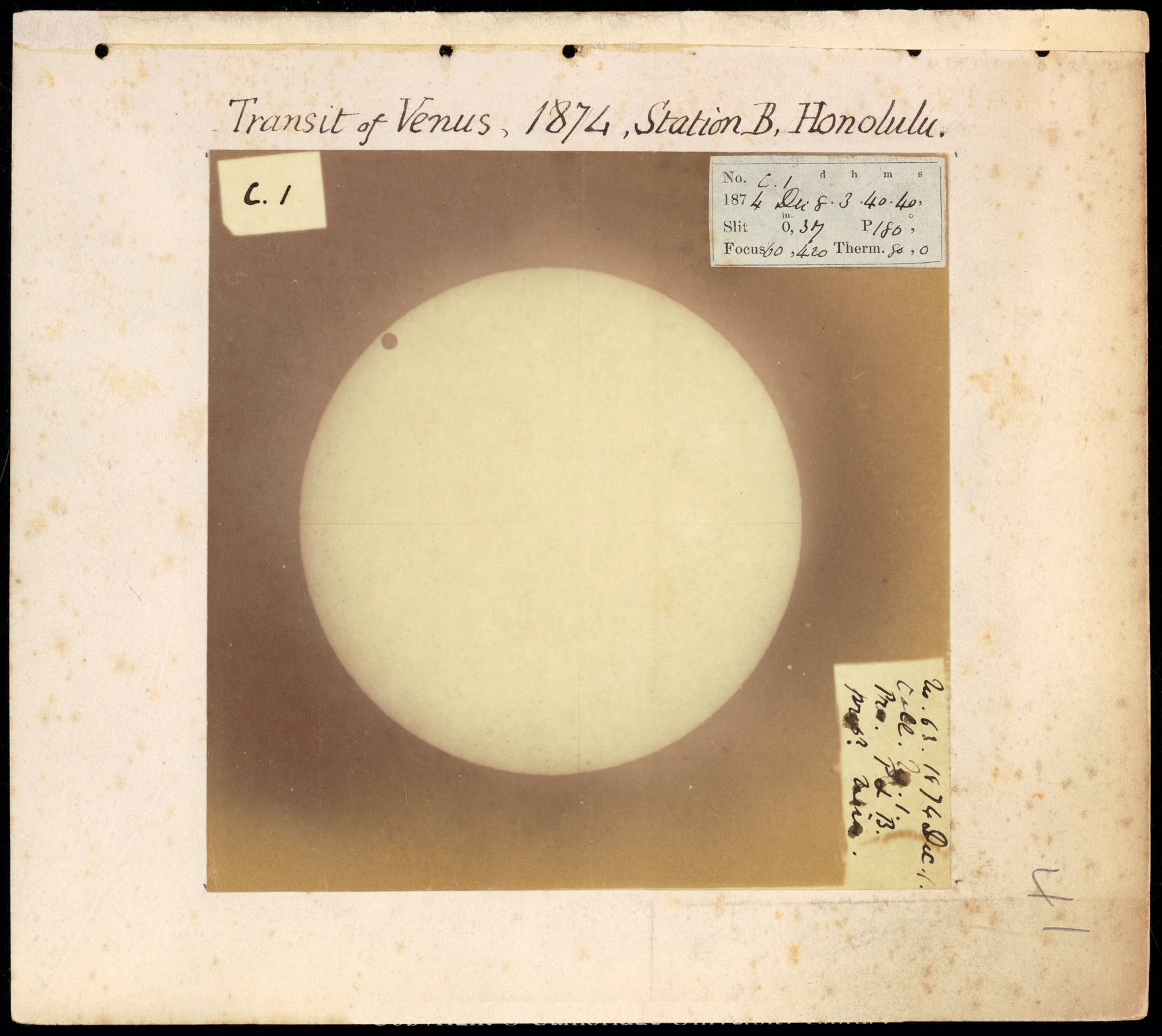
Photographic print showing the Transit of Venus across the Sun, taken December 8, 1874 at Honolulu station

Four times during every 243 years, Venus passes between the Sun and Earth allowing its silhouette to be observed by skilled and amateur astronomers around the world. The transit of Venus occurs in pairs. The first of the pair that took place in the 1800s occurred on December 9, 1874.

Moran served as chief photographer on the U.S. expedition to Australia, one of the eight American teams to join the 1874 international scientific effort to record the Transit of Venus across the sun, which would allow scientists to more accurately establish the distance between the Earth and the Sun. The effort helped unravel one of the primary mysteries of Solar System astronomy, the true value of the astronomical unit.

Moran sent back reports of his travels to the Philadelphia Photographer. Even though clouds and intermittent rain covered the sky at his station at Barrack Square in Hobart Town, Tasmania, Moran and his team in Australia brought back over 300 photographic documents, including 125 images of the Transit of Venus.

The photographic equipment selected by the US expedition was the American Optical Company's "Venus Camera Box". The unit used a special negative plate holder that allowed the photographer to take multiple exposures in register. Able to slide both vertically and horizontally, the holder employed pins that fit into a series of stepped registration holes. In order to create scientifically useful multiple exposures, the process required three photographers, one to expose the sensitized glass, one to move the glass, registering it with the pins and one to note the time of each successive exposure using a chronometer. Two sizes of plates were used. The large plates were exposed every 54 seconds. The smaller plates were exposed at a rate of 1.9 second intervals.

== Later career ==
In the late nineteenth century, the dry photographic plate was perfected. It replaced the wet collodion process Moran had used for years. He apparently lost interest in photography and resumed painting as a creative outlet.

== Artistic legacy ==
After 1865, the art of John Moran "disappeared" into collections of photographic prints and historic documents. His seminal artistic photographs were "one-off" (individually hand printed and mounted) albumen prints and therefore limited in quantity. Original John Moran prints are over 150 years old and now quite rare.

Moran's photographs pre-dated rotogravure and halftone print reproduction, so his work was not able to be known by the public on a mass-market scale. Later photographers like Alfred Stieglitz greatly benefitted from having their work printed in magazines, art books and other publications. Consequently, photographers who followed Moran became better known to the public. Moran has been overlooked for decades.

=== Auction history ===
Moran's pioneering body of nineteenth-century early photography is being rediscovered, appreciated and collected. In 2010, Christie's New York auction house sold a Moran albumen silver print showing the demolition of the Bank of Pennsylvania. The sale price at $32,000 (equivalent to $47,246 in 2025), set a new auction record for an original John Moran print.

== Gallery ==
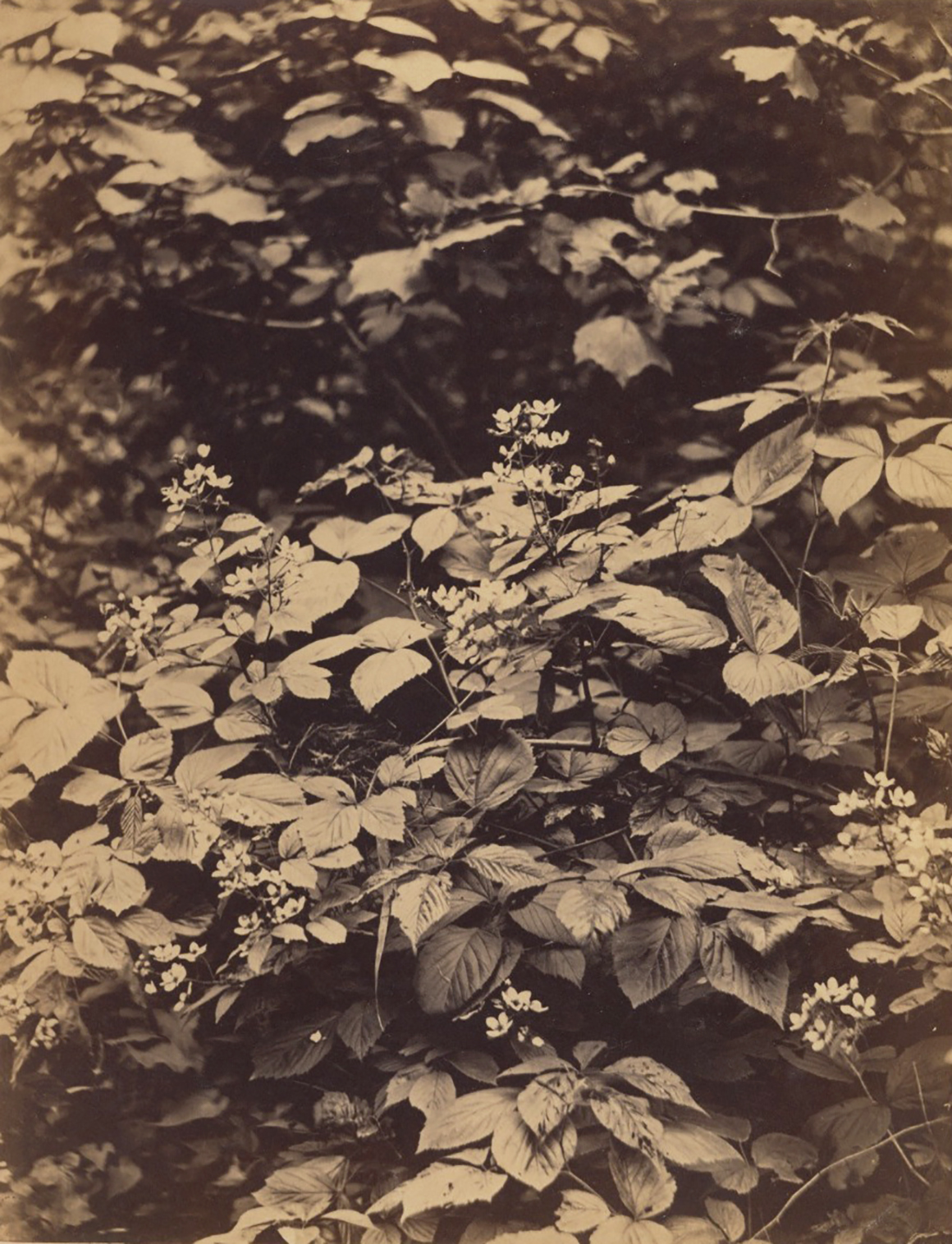
Blackberry Bushes, 1862, albumen silver print, 19.4 × 15 cm (7 5/8 x 5 7/8 in.), collection of William L. Schaeffer

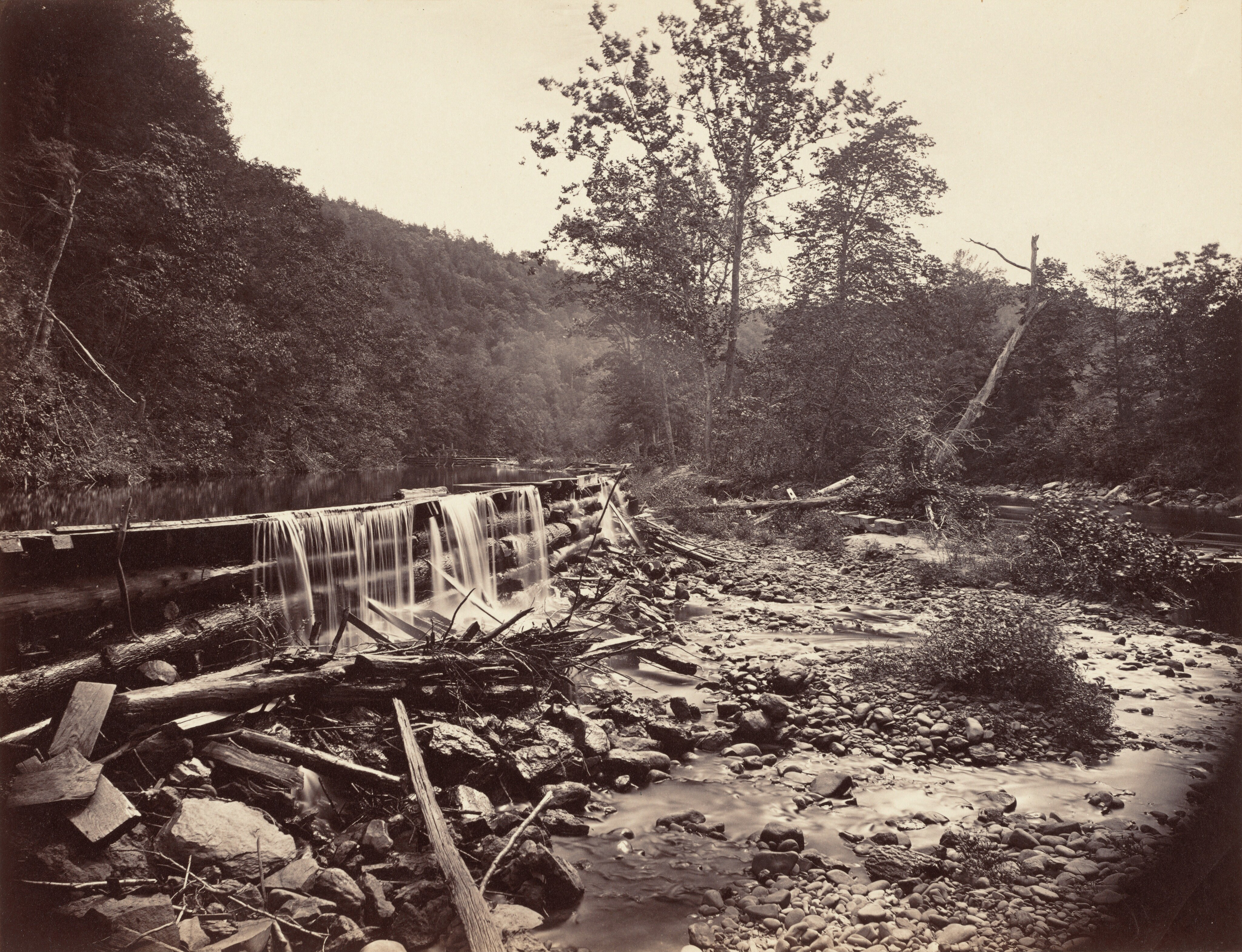
Broadhead’s Creek, Delaware Water Gap, 1863, albumen silver print, 26.3 × 33 cm (10 1/4 × 13 3/8 in.), National Gallery of Art, Washington, D.C.

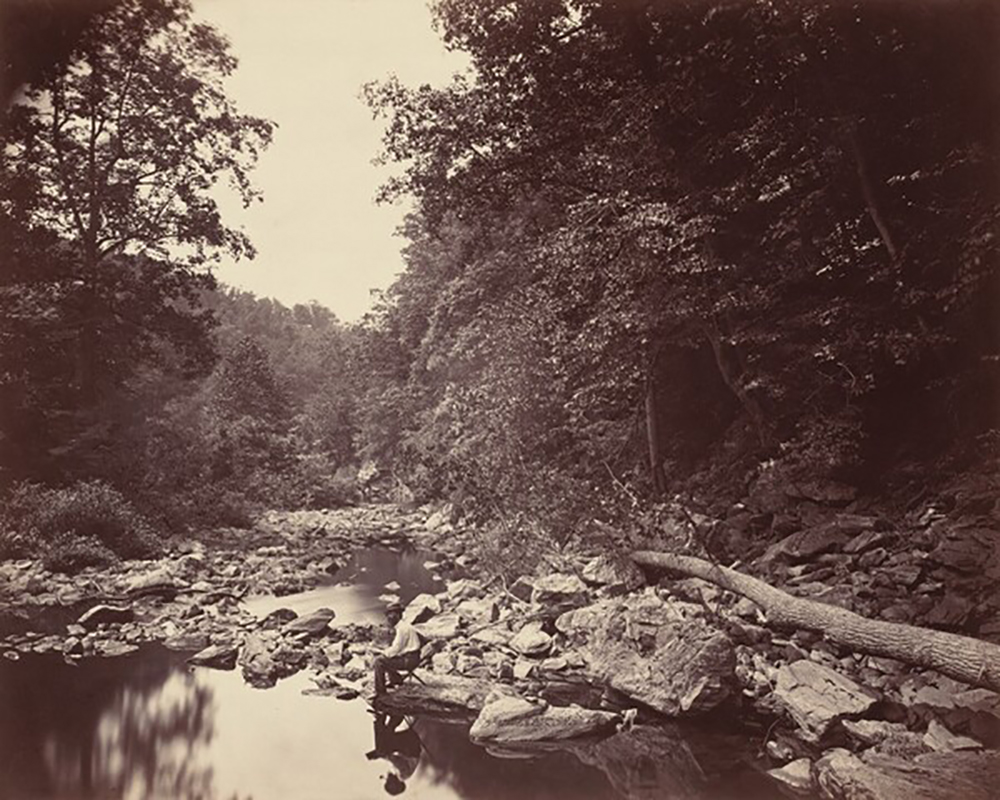
Broadhead’s Creek, Delaware Water Gap, 1863, albumen silver print, 26.1 x 34 cm (10 3/8 × 13 in.) National Gallery of Art, Washington, D.C.

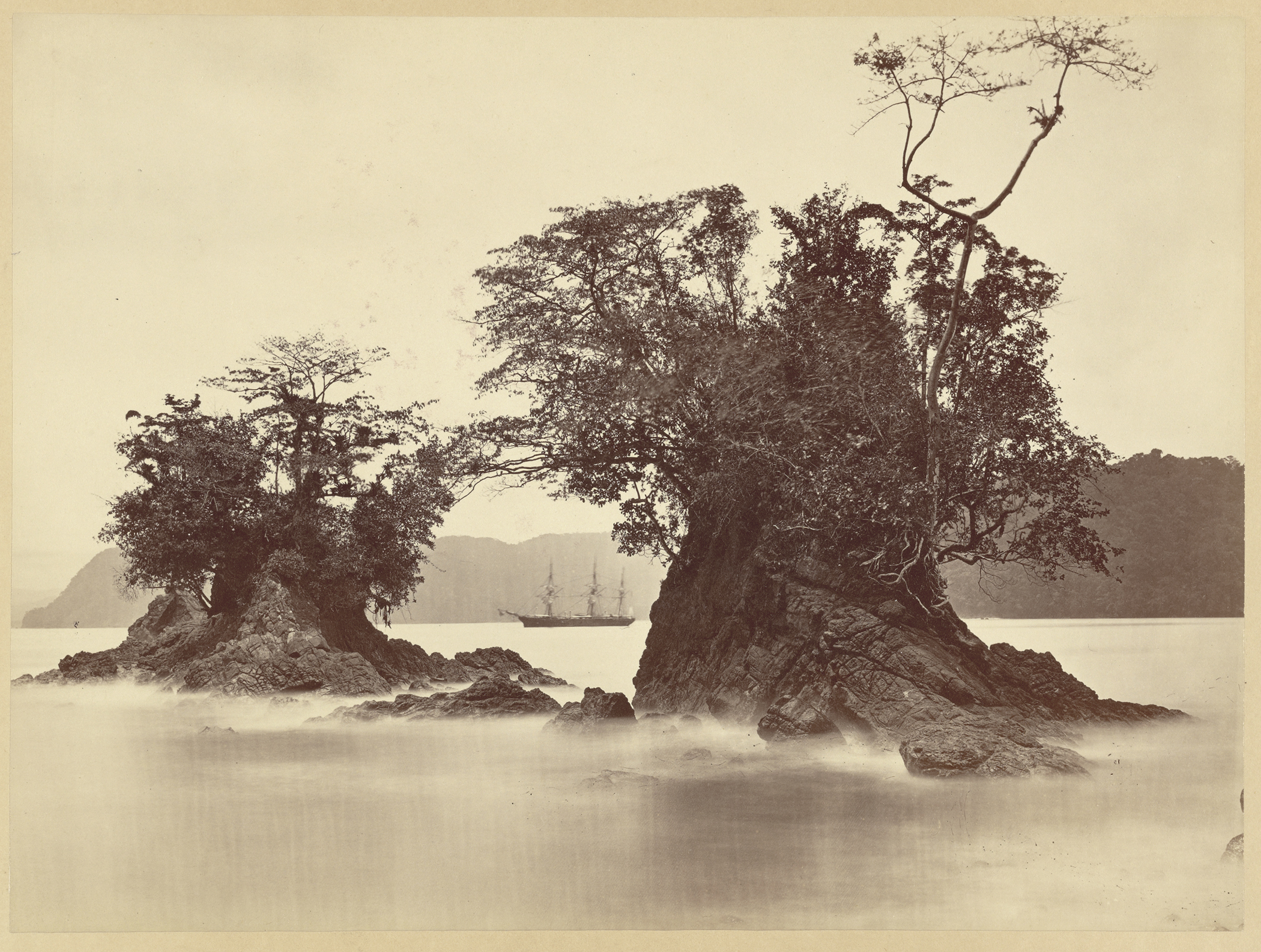
Limon Bay, High Tide., 1871, albumen silver print, 20.2 × 27 cm (7 15/16 × 10 5/8 in.), J. Paul Getty Museum, Los Angeles, California

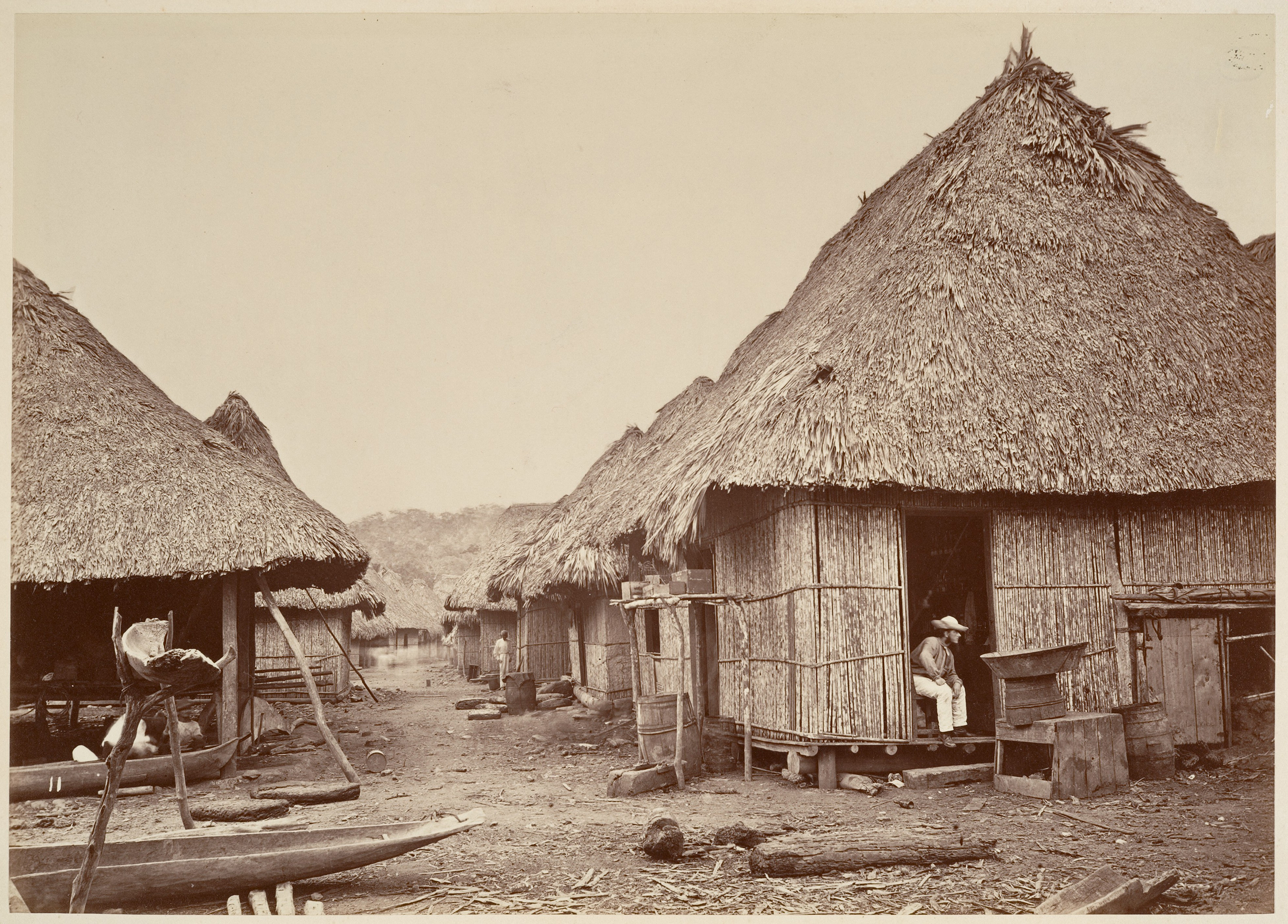
Tropical Scenery, Street, Chipigana, 1871, albumen silver print, 20.3 x 27.9 cm (8 x 11 in.), The Metropolitan Museum of Art, New York, New York

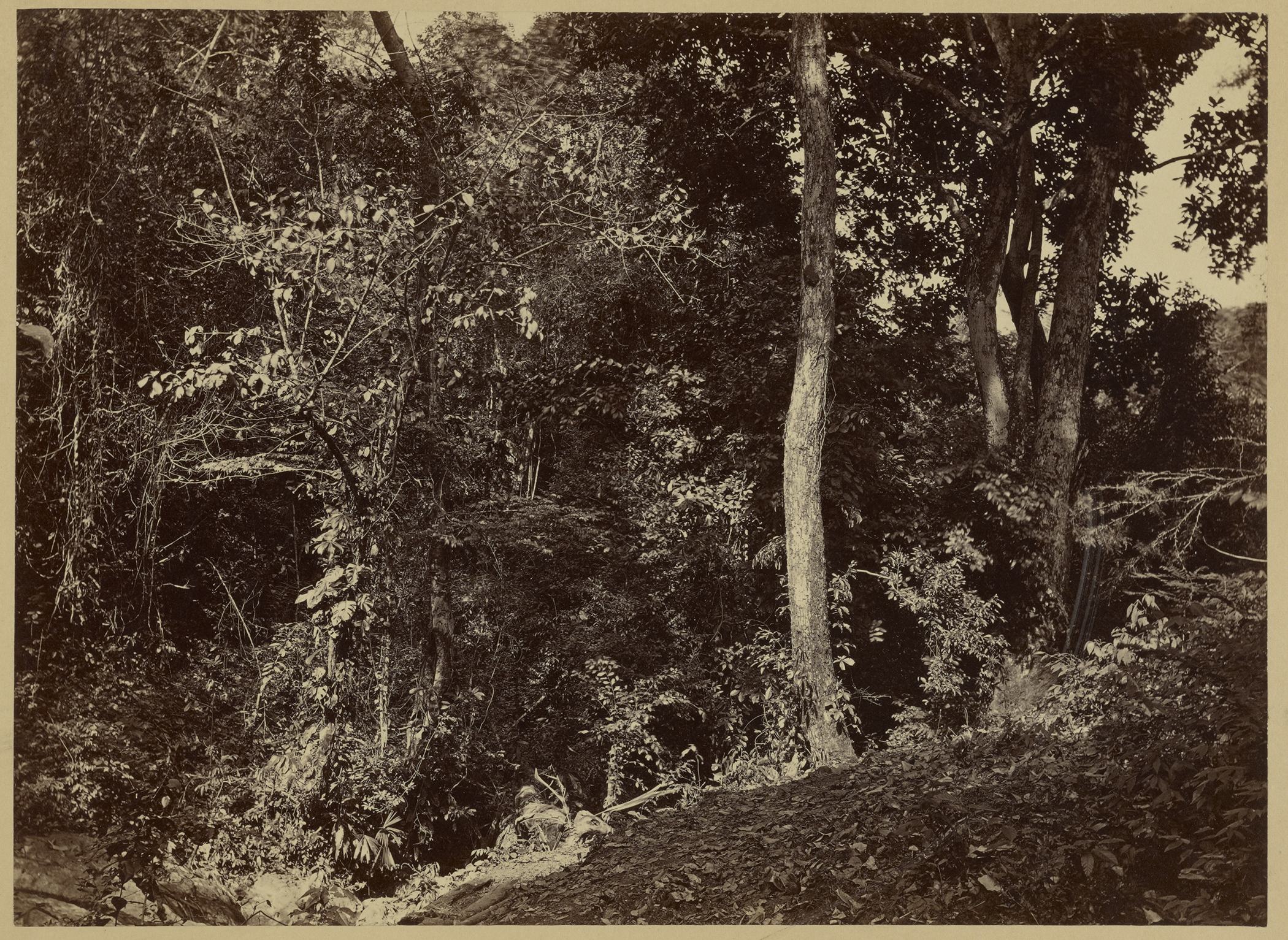
View near Chipigana., 1871, albumen silver print, 20.2 × 27.5 cm (7 7/8 × 10 13/16 in.), J. Paul Getty Museum, Los Angeles, California

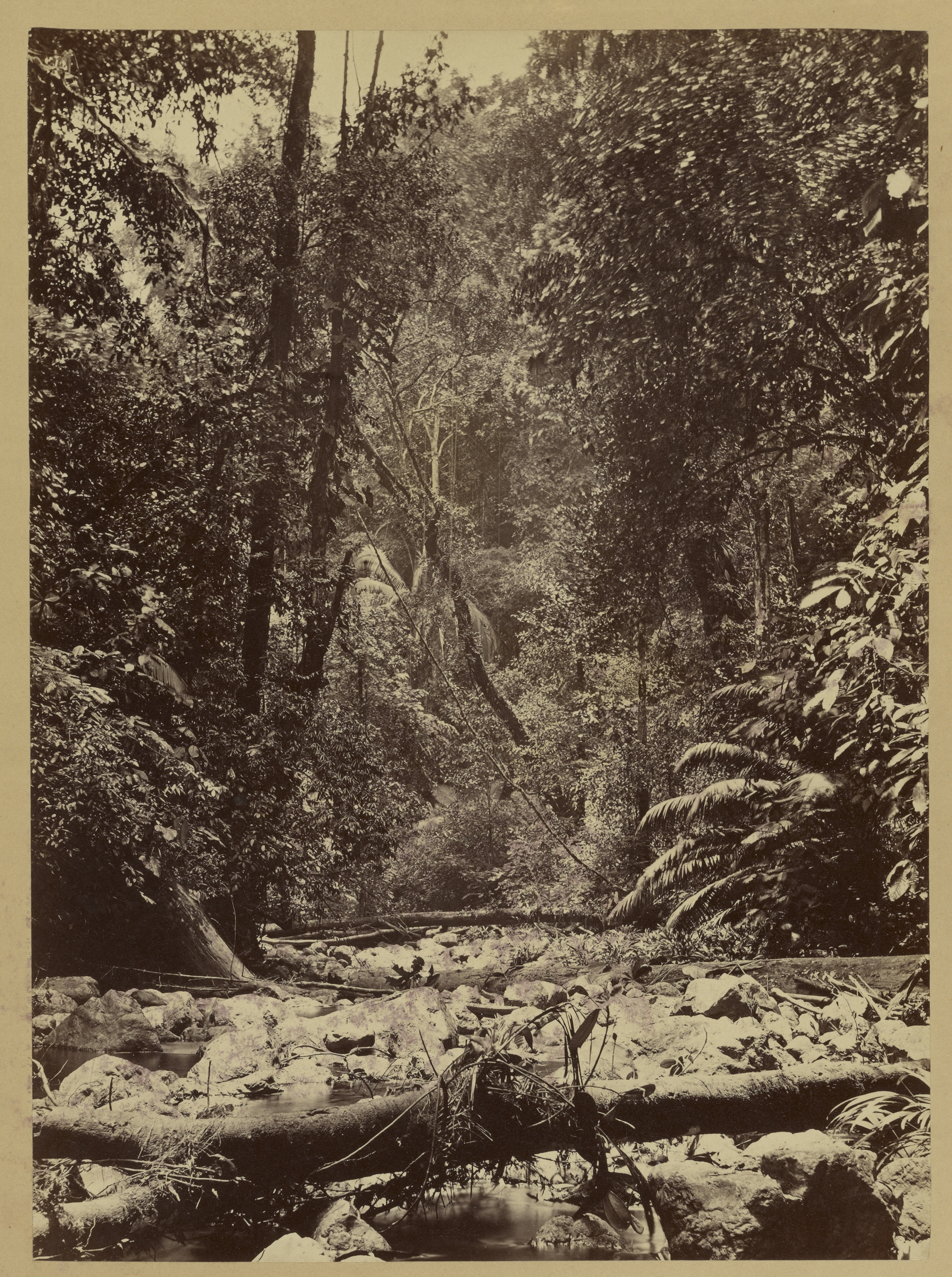
Wilds of the Isthsmus., 1871, albumen silver print, 27.6 × 20.2 cm (10 7/8 × 7 15/16 in.), J. Paul Getty Museum, Los Angeles, California

== Works ==
- Moran, John (1868). The Artists' Fund Annual: A Collection of Twenty Photographs From Original Designs By Members of the Artists' Fund Society of Philadelphia. Philadelphia, Pennsylvania: Artists' Fund Society of Philadelphia. – Illustrations are 20 mounted albumen photographs by John Moran of art works by E.B. Bensell, V. de V. Bonfield, John Faulkner, T.J. Fenimore, S.J. Ferris, James Hamilton, Ridgway Knight, G.C. Lambdin, Edward Moran, Peter Moran, Thomas Moran, W.T. Richards, Samuel Sartain, Christian Schussele, T. Henry Smith, N.H. Trotter, S.B. Waugh, W.H. Willcox, I.L. Williams, and G.B. Wood, Jr.

== Essays ==
- Moran, John (March 1865). "The Relation of Photography to the Fine Arts". The Philadelphia Photographer.
- Moran, John (May 26, 1865). "The Relation of Photography to the Fine Arts". The Photographic News: A Weekly Record of the Progress of Photography. 9: 247.
- Moran, John (June 1875). "Thoughts on Art, Nature and Photography". The Philadelphia Photographer: 179.
- Moran, John (October 1875). "Reflections on Art". The Philadelphia Photographer.
