= Animex International Festival of Animation and Computer Games =

Annual animation, VFX and computer gaming festival in Middlesbrough, United Kingdom

Animex
- Location: Middlesbrough, England
- Founded: 2000; 25 years ago
- Language: English
- Website: animex.tees.ac.uk

The Animex International Festival of Animation, VFX and Computer Games takes place every year in Middlesbrough, North Yorkshire, England. The festival has its roots firmly planted in the creative side of the animation, visual effects and computer games industries and acts to provide animators, VFX artists, compositors, directors, students, artists, designers, writers and educators with a forum in which they can share their knowledge and skills and promote the art of animation and computer games development.

== History ==
Animex was founded by university lecturers Chris Williams and Siobhan Fenton. It began as a two-day series of lectures by animators and industry professionals at the University of Teesside in February 2000, and has grown to a week-long festival incorporating the two-day event that began it all, Animex Talk. Animex Game was founded by Gabrielle Kent in 2004, creating another two days of presentations, this time by games professionals. Chris Williams remained director until leaving the university in 2012, at which point Gabrielle took over until 2018.

== Animex today ==
The main venue for the festival is The University of Teesside.

The festival also runs an exhibition of animation and games art, an international student awards scheme, screenings, workshops and Animexperience, a programme of school and community events giving people the chance to try their hand at animation and meet industry luminaries.

Guest speakers in the past have included such industry professionals as stop motion legend Ray Harryhausen, Pixar animator Mark Walsh, Bob the Builder designer Curtis Jobling, Phil Tippett, Nancy Cartwright, the voice of Bart Simpson, Blitz Games, Ernest W. Adams, Chris Crawford, Professor Stuart Sumida and representatives from games and animation studios around the world.

Animex was in part the inspiration for the Red Stick International Animation Festival in Baton Rouge, Louisiana.

Animex is run by a team of people, including animation and computer games lecturers within the University of Teesside as well as support staff.

- Animex AVFX Coordinator - Chris Wyatt
- Animex Game Coordinator - Franck Dhotel
- Animex Exhibition - Stephen Murray
- Animex Screen & Awards - Claire O'Brien
- Festival Founders - Chris Williams & Siobhan Fenton
