= Canterbury Anifest =

Animation festival in England

- Location: Canterbury, England
- Founded: 2007; 18 years ago
- Language: England
- Website: www.canterburyanifest.com

Canterbury Anifest is an animation festival located in Canterbury, England. Anifest is an annual event that takes place in March and describes itself as "the largest annual event of this kind in the South East". It was founded in 2007 by Canterbury City Council. Industry guests have included Aardman, Double Negative, DreamWorks, LAIKA, Pixar, and The Ray Harryhausen Foundation. Since 2016, the festival has been run by a group of media lecturers at Canterbury Christ Church University.

== Awards ==
Awards categories include

- Best British film
- Best International Film
- Best Student Film
- Best Animation
- Best Art Design
- Best Sound
- Audience Award

== See also ==
- List of international animation festivals
