= 2D Or Not 2D Animation Festival =

Animation Festival in the United States

- Status: Active
- Genre: animation
- Venue: Pacific Science Center
- Locations: Seattle, Washington
- Country: USA
- Organizer: Animaticus Foundation

The 2D Or Not 2D Animation Festival (2dornot2d), is an animated film festival held annually in Seattle, Washington, and devoted to international animation cinema. The Pacific Science Center hosts the event in its IMAX theater which resides on the campus of Seattle Center.

== Background ==
The parent organization of 2D or not 2D is the Animaticus Foundation, a non-profit organization dedicated to the preservation, education and evolution of traditional 2D animation. The foundation acts to allow survival of 2D animation through education and high level production, and through allowing future animators opportunities to study and gain experience through apprenticeships to established master animators.

== Festivals ==
=== Past Festivals ===
==== 2009 ====
On 5 December 2009, the fourth annual 2D Or Not 2D was held in the Eames Imax Theater at the Pacific Science Center in Seattle, Washington.

==== 2008 ====
On the 14th-15 November 2008, the third annual 2D Or Not 2D was held in the Boeing Imax Theater at the Pacific Science Center in Seattle, Washington.

==== 2007 ====
On the 2nd-3 November 2007, the second annual 2D Or Not 2D was held in the Everett Theater in Everett, Washington. Roy E. Disney was keynote speaker.

==== 2006 ====
On the 17th-19 November 2006, the first annual 2D Or Not 2D was held in the Everett Theater in Everett, Washington.
