= Red Stick International Animation Festival =

Annual animation festival at Louisiana State University

The Red Stick International Animation Festival is an annual event is hosted by the Lab for Creative Arts & Technologies (LCAT), a research group within the Louisiana State University's Center for Computation and Technology. The first festival took place from April 21 until April 23, 2005, and has occurred annually since in the Downtown Arts District in Baton Rouge, Louisiana. The 2005 festival drew over 1200 attendees. In 2006, just over 2000 people attended, and in 2007, over 4000 people attended festival events.

== History ==
The festival was founded by Stephen David Beck and Stacey Simmons, bringing an idea from the Animex festival in England, as a way to demonstrate the linkage between creativity and technology, their focus at LCAT, and to bring awareness to the opportunities in both creative and technical disciplines for jobs, careers and economic development that are available through entertainment technologies. The name "Red Stick" is the literal English translation of Baton Rouge, Louisiana, where the festival is held.

Planning for the first festival began in the fall of 2003, with the event taking place in April 2005. Since then, the festival has occurred annually in the third week of April.

Speakers and workshop leaders at past festivals have included representatives from Disney, Pixar, DreamWorks, Digital Domain, Sony Imageworks and other companies. They include Ed Hooks, Stuart Sumida, Mark Walsh, Walt Hyneman, David Bolinsky, Karen deJong, Gary Schwartz, and Rachelle Lewis.

The Red Stick Festival takes place at the Louisiana Art & Science Museum, Old State Capitol, and the LSU Museum of Art and Manship Theatre, part of the Shaw Center for the Arts.
