= Edward Moran =

English-born American maritime artist (1829–1901)

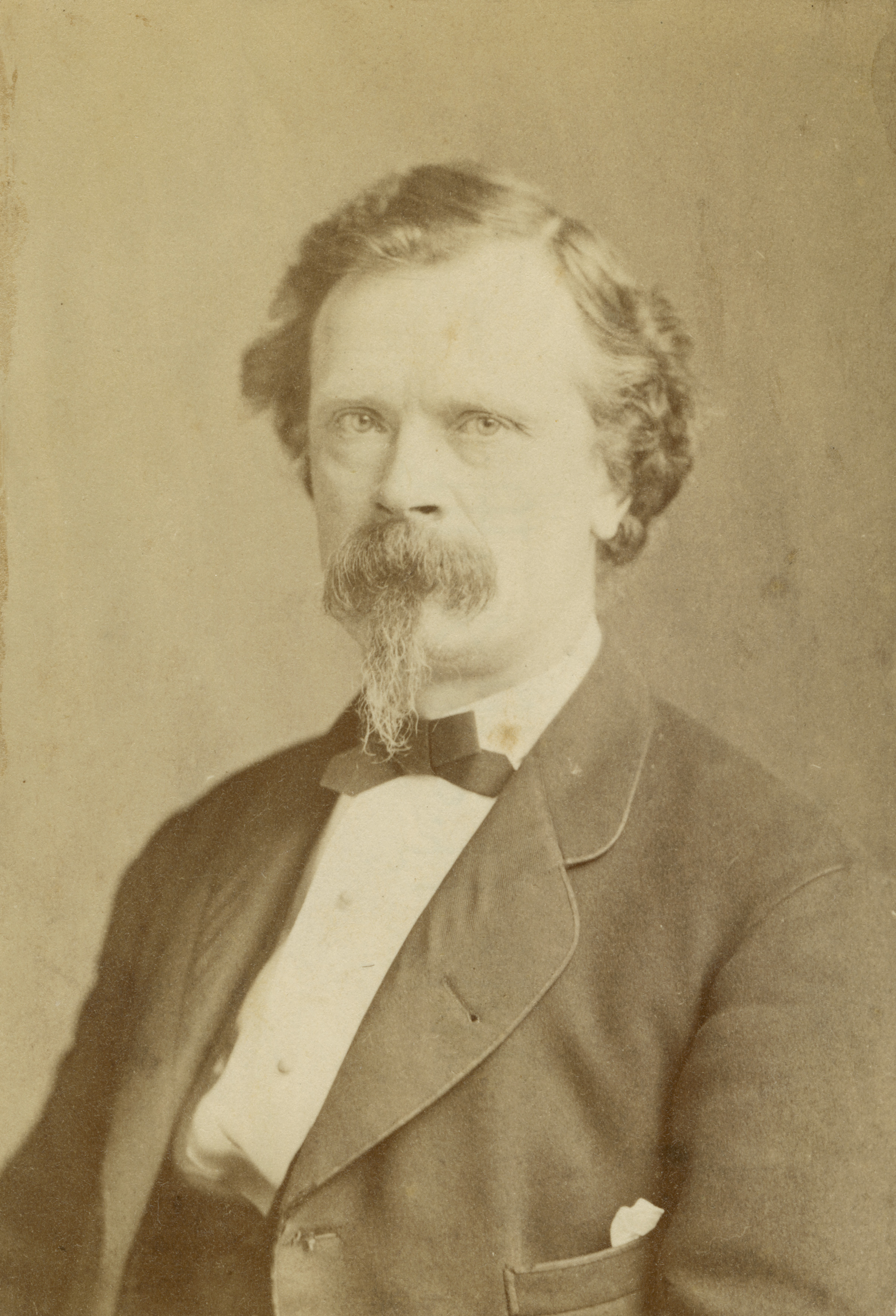
- Moran in the 1860s
- Born: August 19, 1829; Bolton, Lancashire
- Died: June 8, 1901 (aged 71); New York City, US
- Education: Royal Academy
- Known for: Marine art

Edward Moran (August 19, 1829 – June 8, 1901) was an English-born American painter who specialized in marine art. He is best known for his series of thirteen paintings on the maritime history of the United States.

== Early life ==
Moran was born to Thomas Moran Sr. and Mary (née Higson) of Lancashire, England on August 19, 1829. Following in the footsteps of his father's profession, he learned to operate a hand-loom at a young age, though he would often be found sketching with charcoal on the white fabric instead of plying the shuttle.

His family emigrated to Maryland in 1844, and then to Philadelphia a year later. Though Moran loved to regale others with a tale of walking alone from Baltimore to Philadelphia to find a better future for himself, his niece said the entire family moved to the city together.

== Career ==
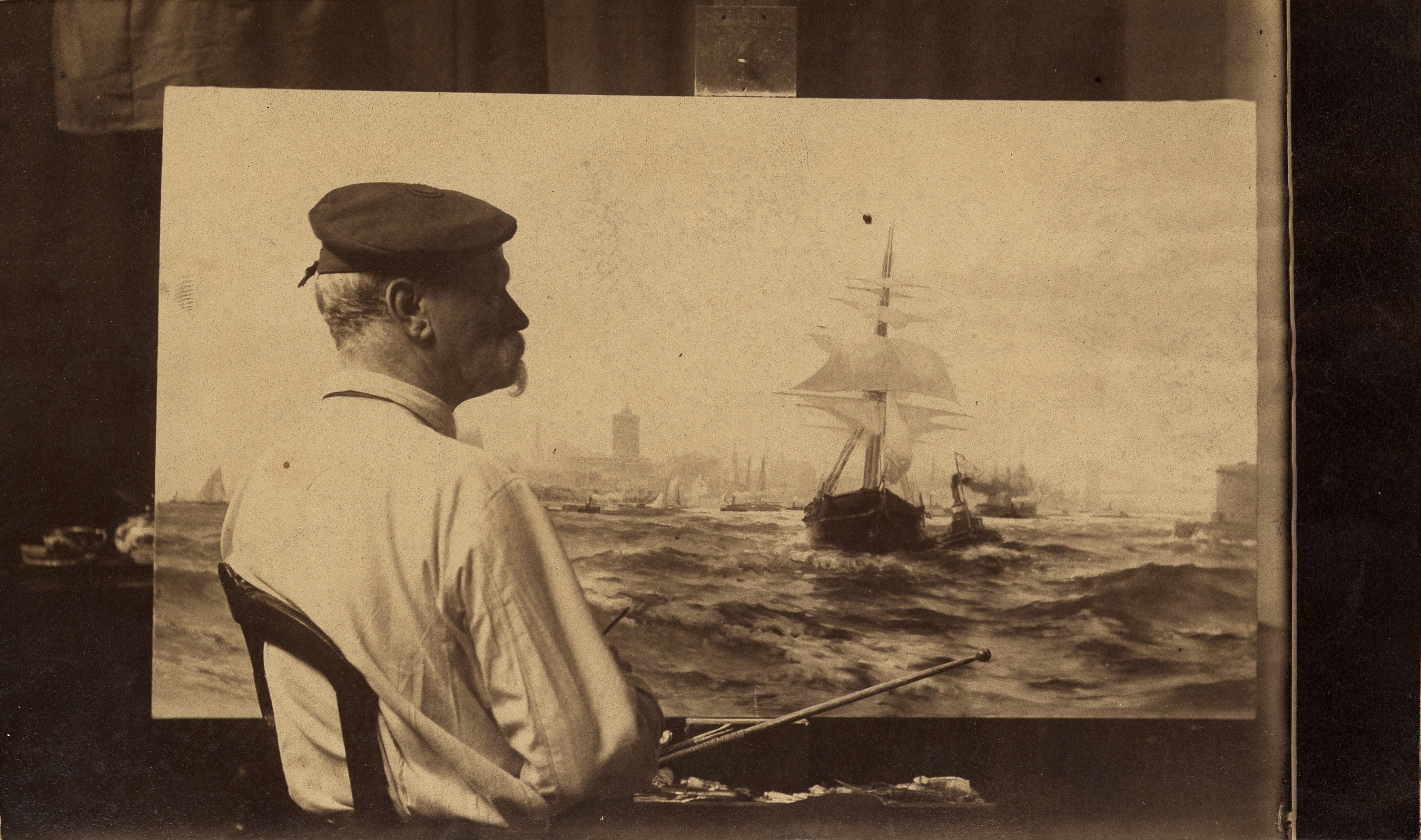
Moran in his studio, c. 1870.

It was in Philadelphia around 1845 that Edward apprenticed under James Hamilton and landscape painter Paul Weber; Hamilton guided Moran specifically in the style of marine paintings. In the 1850s, Moran began to make a name for himself in the Philadelphia artistic scene; working in the same studio as his younger brother, famous American painter Thomas Moran, Edward received commissions and even completed some lithographic work.

In 1862, he traveled to London and became a pupil in the Royal Academy. After moving back to Philadelphia, Moran married Annette Parmentier (his second wife), whom he also apprenticed as a landscape artist in her own right. He then established a studio in New York in 1872, and for some time after 1877 lived in Paris.

One of his more well-known exhibits, titled Land and Sea, showed 75 of his landscape and marine paintings in March 1871; these paintings were later illustrated in a catalog by the same name. Proceeds from the exhibit, the catalog, and the sale of another painting (The Relief Ship Entering Havre) were donated by Moran to aid the sufferers of the Franco-Prussian War.

In 1885, at the height of his career, Moran began what would be considered his most important work - a series of 13 paintings representing the Marine History of the United States. He chose to have thirteen paintings in the series because of the significance of the number in American history (13 colonies, 13 stars and stripes on the original US flag, etc.). The subjects include Leif Erikson, Christopher Columbus, Hernando de Soto, Henry Hudson, and George Dewey, among others. Not long after their completion, the series was displayed at the 1893 World's Columbian Exposition in Chicago.

== Later life ==
Moran lived in New York City until his death on June 8, 1901. He was interred at Woodlawn Cemetery in the Bronx, New York. Although he had given the series of thirteen paintings to his wife several years before, a legal battle ensued after his death over ownership of the paintings: the executor of Moran's estate refused to hand them over, declaring that they were rightfully under his protection. The Supreme Court in New York City eventually judged in favor of Moran's widow.

== Legacy ==
At the time of his death, Moran was widely considered to be one of the most important 19th century marine painters. Today he is not as well-known, eclipsed by the work of his younger brother, Thomas Moran (1837–1926), whose career he helped launch. In addition, his sons Edward Percy Moran (1862–1935) and John Leon Moran (1864–1941), his other brother Peter (1841–1914), and his nephew Jean Leon Gerome Ferris (1863–1930), also became prominent American artists.
