= International Film Festival of Wales =

- Location: Wales
- Founded: 2006; 17 years ago
- Language: English
- Website: https://www.filmfestivalguild.com/

The International Film Festival of Wales (IFFW), previously known as the Newport International Film Festival (2007–2015), is an annual film festival established in 2006 and is one of four festivals hosted by the Film Festival Guild, including the British Animation Film Festival, the British Independent Film Festival and the British Horror Film Festival. IFFW was held in various venues in Newport before branching out to other areas of Wales such as Neath Port Talbot and Cardiff, and is now located at the oldest cinema in Wales, the Market Hall Cinema in Brynmawr. The festival showcases a wide variety of films from around the world including feature films, shorts films, music videos and documentaries, with a particular emphasis on Welsh cinema.

The International Film Festival of Wales aims to provide a platform for filmmakers from diverse backgrounds to showcase their work, participate in exclusive opportunities for networking, as well as to promote cultural exchange and dialogue through the medium of film. The festival attracts a diverse audience including filmmakers, industry professionals, and film enthusiasts from Wales and beyond.

In addition to film screenings, the festival features Q&A sessions with filmmakers, actors and film crew. The festival also presents a number of awards, including Best Feature Film, Best Short Film, Best Director and many others. IFFW also showcases and supports unproduced screenplays of outstanding quality, which are featured and award as part of The Dragon List.

Since its inception, IFFW has grown in stature and reputation, attracting an increasing number of attendees and submissions from around the world. This festival has become an annual event in Wales, as well as an important platform for promoting Welsh cinema on the international stage.

In addition to its typical in-person events, the International Film Festival of Wales was also hosted online in 2020 and 2021 due to the COVID-19 pandemic.

== Awards (2007–) ==
=== 2007 Newport International Film Festival Official Selection and Award winners ===
2007 Film Nominees (5 Films)	Award Winners
Tomorrow Never Dais (10mins, Dir. by Anthony James)	Best Short Film & Best Actor (Magnus Hinde)
Delivery (9mins, Dir. by Till Nowak)	
On All Your Walls (Dir. by Alan D. Pughe)	Best Music Video
The Strange Case of Marie France (15mins, Dir. by Till Neumann)	Best of Fest
The Lost (103mins, Dir. by Neil Jones)	Best Feature Film

=== 2008 Newport International Film Festival Official Selection and Award winners ===
2008 Film Nominees (25 Films)	Award Winners
Electreecity (3mins, Dir. by Sarah Duffield-Harding & Sarah Davidson)	
Let Sleeping Dogs Lie (29mins, Dir. by Shauna Osborne-Dowle)	
Julie (5mins, Dir. by David Cage)	
My Dad Made a Seagull (4mins, Dir. by Mark Withers)	
Dance for Eternity (12mins, Dir. by Michael Gilroy)	
Dictee Magique (3mins, Dir. by Aaron Fuks)	
Half Life (50mins, Dir. by Mark Brindle)	
Mother Mine (17mins, Dir. by Susan Everett)	Best Up & Coming Director
Colourful EU (2mins, Dir. by Peter Vadocz)	
Check Mate (16mins, Dir. by Mitja Mlakar, Mojca Pernat, Robert Ribic & Miha Subic)	
Paintbrush (8mins, Dir. by Alex Barrett)	
The Gynaecologist (10mins, Dir. by Alfonso Camarero)	
Flushed (4mins, Dir. by Martin Stirling)	
Brother Psyche (5mins, Dir. by Ben Reed)	Best Music Video
Eva (16mins, Dir. by David Trumble)	Best Student Film
Jack Says (85mins, Dir. by Bob Phillips)	Best Feature Film, Best Actor (Simon Philips), Best Actress (Anne Coesens)
Mike Cotton (3mins, Dir. by Mike Cotton)	
Red Letter (11mins, Dir. by Edilberto Restino)	
Ruin (7mins, Dir. by Mark Maguire & Richard Shelton)	Audience Award
Jody Coyote (2mins, Dir. by Ben Reed)	
Echoes (14mins, Dir. by Rob Brown)	
Pitch (10mins, Dir. by David Christopher & Tyler Keevil)	Welsh Dragon Award
My Best Friend (15mins, Dir. by Daniele Santonicola)	Best Short Film, Best Script
The Ballad of the Roman Road (5mins, Dir. by Mark Brindle)	
9MM (94mins, Dir. by Taylan Barman)	Best Cinematography

=== 2009 Newport International Film Festival Official Selection and Award winners ===
2009 Film Nominees (24 Films)	Award Winners
Kandahar Break	Best Feature Film, Best Actor (Shaun Dooley)
Chabalu	Best Short Film
Mr Right	Best Music Video
Remember Me	Best Student Film
Predilection	Best Up & Coming Director (Marcio Garcia)
Homemade Vigilante	Best Up & Coming Producer (Neil Turner & Nathan Turner)
Love Apples	Best Actress (Nicole Nabout)
Switchbacks	Best Documentary
Shattered Pieces	Best Short Film Actor (Drew Dillon)
Fading Away	Best Short Film Actress (Liane Duesterhoeft)
Tales from the Catholic Church of Elvis	Best Supporting Actor (Larry Gelman)
Big Things	Best Supporting Actress (Micaiah Dring)
Sekunder	Best Young Actress (Marie Boda)
Running Pains	Best Sound Design
This Womans World	Best Original Score
The Clearing	Best Cinematography
The Last Confession of Alexander Pearce	Best Props
The Valley of Knockanure	Best Costume
Arthurs Lore	Best Special Effects
Hunting Party	Best Script (Written by James Kirtland)
Me Me Me	Welsh Dragon Award
Rika and Mallon (Unproduced screenplay by Charlotte Boulay-Goldsmith)	Best New Screenplay
You Don't Know Bertha Constantine (Unproduced screenplay by Andrew Knightlinger)	Most Original New Screenplay
Wild Jokers (Unproduced screenplay by Catherine Cole)	Best Adapted Screenplay

=== 2010 Newport International Film Festival Official Selection and Award winners ===
2010 Film Nominees (12 Films)	Award Winners
40 Years (14mins, Dir. by Russell Appleford)	Best Special Effects
Blind Eye (6mins, Dir. by Laura Degnan)	
Siren	
The Escort (18mins, Dir. by Clare Holman)	Best Cinematography, Best Supporting Actress (La Charne Jolly)
Mozambique (17mins, Dir. by Alcides Soares)	
Astronauts, Vikings and Ghosts	Best Documentary
On the Edge	Best Short Film
One Dark Night (22mins, Dir. by Jonathan Moxness)	
No More Milk (7mins, Dir. by Dan Heaver & Dan Saunders)	Welsh Dragon Award
Risen (103mins, Dir. by Neil Jones)	Best Feature Film, Best Actor (Stuart Brennan), Best Actress (Grainne Joughin), Best Supporting Actor (Boyd Clack), Best Director
The Drummond Will (81mins, Dir. by Alan Butterworth)	
End of the Road (73mins, Dir. by Richard Nicholls)	
Double Top (Unproduced screenplay by Christopher Bolton)	Best New Screenplay

=== 2011 Newport International Film Festival Official Selection and Award winners ===
2011 Film Nominees (16 Films)	Award Winners
Mary and Bill (40mins, Dir. by Andrew Napier)	
In Sunshine or in Shadow (60mins, Dir. by Andrew Gallimore)	
The Quizmaster (10mins, Dir. by Sam Haire)	
Letter to Julia (10mins, Dir. by David G. Rudiez)	
The Black Hills (10mins, Dir. by Richard Pask)	
Queensbury Rules (11mins, Dir. by William Scothern)	
The Anchor (15mins, Dir. by Luke Daniels)	
Sudden Death! (20mins, Dir. by Adam Hall)	Best Director
The Gin Lady (10mins, Dir. by Simon Cook)	Best Actress (Marian Kemmer), Best Short Film (Audience Award)
Everythought (7mins, Dir. by Asif Bux)	Best Student Film (Audience Award)
Hunger (3mins, Dir. by Daniel Chisholm)	
Taken Away (The Particles) (4mins, Dir. by Fred Khoshtinat)	
The Rise of the Appliances (10mins, Dir. by Rob Sprackling)	
Mother's Milk (95mins, Dir. by Gerald Fox)	
Down the Dark Road (95mins, Dir. by Craig T. James & Jared Morgan)	
Stag Night of the Dead (81mins, Dir. by Neil Jones)	Best Feature Film, Best Actor (Sebastian Street)
Should Have Gone Bowling (Unproduced screenplay by Glen Fulthorpe)	Best New Screenplay

=== 2012 Newport International Film Festival Official Selection and Award winners ===
2012 Film Nominees (21 Films)	Award Winners
Dawid and Dominick (7mins, Dir. by Andrew Salamonczyk)	
Hath No Man (15mins, Dir. by Linus Koh)	
Orpheus (7mins, Dir. by James Button)	Best Cinematography for Student Film
Three Small Words (7mins, Dir. by Tyson Breuer)	
For the Fallen (10mins, Dir. by Matthew Evans)	
Callum (14mins, Dir. by Michael Van Der Put)	Best Student Short Film, Best Director for Student Film
The Hatch (14mins, Dir. by Mike Ahern & Enda Loughman)	
Busker Bolt (9mins, Dir. by Richard Pask)	
Klein (7mins, Dir. by Sanne Vogel)	
Kiss (12mins, Dir. by Mat Johns)	Best Director for Short Film
Punched (11mins, Dir. by Michael Rittmannsberger)	Best Short Film, Best Cinematography for Short Film
The Anniversary (4mins, Dir. by Anthony Sutcliffe)	Welsh Dragon Award
Make it a Great Day (7mins, Dir. by Joshua Jones)	
Baseball in the Time of Cholera (27mins, Dir. by David Darg)	
VEM (4mins, Dir. by Martin Sjolander)	
The Extraordinary Life of Rocky (14mins, Dir. by Kevin Meul)	
Special Delivery (5mins, Dir. by Nick Flugge)	
Jackals (87mins, Dir. by Simon Lewis)	
Hated (91mins, Dir. by Lee Madsen)	Best Actress (Genevieve Padalecki)
The Sky in Bloom (96mins, Dir. by Tor Mian)	Best Feature Film, Best Cinematography, Best Actor (Sean Knopp)
Before Dawn (90mins, Dir. by Dominic Brunt)	
Dig Deeper (Unproduced screenplay by Rick Limontani)	Best New Screenplay

=== 2013 Newport International Film Festival Official Selection and Award winners ===
2013 Film Nominees (25 Films)	Award Winners
The Better Man (71mins, Dir. by Josh Bennett & Matthew Tindall)	Welsh Dragon Award
Gay Goth Scene (5mins, Dir. by Kai Stanicke)	
Traces (4mins, Dir. by Anthony Sutcliffe)	
Clymau (3mins, Dir. by Richard Pask)	
Time 2 Split (13mins, Dir. by Steven Owen)	
Imagine (30mins, Dir. by Jonathan Green & Jahanara Saleh)	Best Short Film
Clouds (12mins, Dir. by Gilbert James)	
Dear Someone (4mins, Dir. by Tetsuo Kamata)	
Eat (8mins, Dir. by Moritz Kramer)	
The Undream (18mins, Dir. by Alexander Thomas)	
Bridges (16mins, Dir. by Aidan Shipley)	
The German Who Came to Tea (8mins, Dir. by Kerry Kolbe)	
Easy Reader (3mins, Dir. by Lewis Rose)	
Momentum (7mins, Dir. by Boris Seewald)	
Passing of the Bridle (15mins, Dir. by Lewis Barker)	
The Sculptor (8mins, Dir. by Arush Tagotra)	
No Comment (4mins, Dir. by Alexandra Naoum)	
Ballet Story (9mins, Dir. by Daria Belova)	
Lief Lost a Book (10mins, Dir. by Craig Henderson)	
Kerozene (27mins, Dir. by Joachim Weissmann)	
Buck (15mins, Dir. by Richard Davis)	
The Black Scholes Conspiracy (21mins, Dir. by Tim Bassford)	
Cold Star (7mins, Dir. by Kai Stanicke)	
Chapman (104mins, Dir. by Justin Owensby)	Best Feature Film, Best Cinematography
Rufus (109mins, Dir. by Dave Schultz)	Best Director, Best Music
Andy (Unproduced screenplay by Phil Escott)	Best New Screenplay

=== 2014 International Film Festival of Wales Official Selection and Award winners ===
2014 Film Nominees (11 Films)	Award Winners
The Raven on the Jetty (90mins, Dir. by Erik Knusden)	
Weekend Retreat (66mins, Dir. by Brett Harvey)	Best Director
Helium (90mins, Dir. by Eche Janga)	Best Feature Film, Best Cinematography
Dog Judo (2mins, Dir. by Andrew Kelleher)	
Double Occupancy (8mins, Dir. by Fabian Giessler)	Best Music
Happy Tears (5mins, Dir. by Martin Monk)	
NobblyCarrot7 (13mins, Dir. by Josh Allot)	
Penelope (7mins, Dir. by Dan Susman)	
The Bullet Catch (15mins, Dir. by Catherine Attwood)	Best Short Film, Welsh Dragon Award
The Ramona Flowers Tokyo (7mins, Dir. by Bouha Kazmi)	
Tuesday (6mins, Dir. by Oscar Lalo)	
The Yellow Dragon and The Red Fox (Unproduced screenplay by Anthony Etherington)	Best New Screenplay

=== 2015 Newport International Film Festival Official Selection and Award winners ===
2015 Film Nominees (12 Films)	Award Winners
The Man with Four Legs (86mins, Dir. by Ed Christmas)	Best Sound, Best Music
Leave to Remain (89mins, Dir. by Bruce Goodison)	
Solitary (90mins, Dir. by Sasha Krane)	Best Feature Film
Burnt (13mins, Dir. by Robert Vassie)	
Ponty Party (23mins, Dir. by Nathaniel Collins)	Best Short Film
Passing Orion (8mins, Dir. by Sean Thonson)	Best Cinematography
Virtuoso (13mins, Dir. by Steven Owen)	Welsh Dragon Award
Tiny Bible (15mins, Dir. by Zu Quirke)	
In Closure (12mins, Dir. by Lewis Williams & Luke Williams)	
Thundercluck: Chicken of Thor (3mins, Dir. by Paul Tillery)	
Mother's Heart (12mins, Dir. by Diego Barrio)	
Job (10mins, Dir. by Alex Horsfall)	
Have A Great Day (Unproduced screenplay written by Nic Penrake)	Best New Screenplay

=== 2016 International Film Festival of Wales Official Selection and Award winners ===
2016 Film Nominees (13 Films)	Award Winners
Boudewijn (14mins, Dir. by Vincent Fitz-Jim)	
CATCH (16mins, Dir. by Paul Cooke & Dominic Rees-Roberts)	
How Are You (10mins, Dir. by Munzir Quraishy)	Best Short Film
Victoria (8mins, Dir. by Jonathan Kemp)	
Dark Waves (4mins, Dir. by Sven D.)	
5476 Miles (4mins, Dir. by Terry Thomas)	
Rabbit Blood (4mins, Dir. by Yagmur Altan)	
Albert (12mins, Dir. by Miranda Howard-Williams)	
Graduation Afternoon (9mins, Dir. by Calum Chalmers)	
Love Somehow (4mins, Dir. by Kate Cheeseman)	
KEØMA/BLACK (4mins, Dir. by Aviv Kosloff)	
Shadow of The Missing (86mins, Dir. by Jamie Lee Smith)	Welsh Dragon Award
Halcyon Heights (95mins, Dir. by Isla Ure)	Best Feature Film, Best Cinematography, Best Sound, Best Music

=== 2017 International Film Festival of Wales Official Selection and Award winners ===
2017 Film Nominees (14 Films)	Award Winners
Fish Finger Sandwich (17mins, Dir. by Douglas Thomson)	
Lucy in My Eyes (11mins, Dir. by Megan Park)	
Real Artists (12mins, Dir. by Cameo Wood)	
The Sleeping Beauty (6mins, Dir. by Fabio D'Andrea)	
Waterfall (19mins, Dir. by Tom Lock Griffiths)	
The Hex (12mins, Dir. by Nicholas Jessup)	
A Break in the Clouds (20mins, Dir. by Tristan Heanue)	
Rounds (17mins, Dir. by Siôn Marshall-Waters)	
State of Emergency, Motherfucker! (6mins, Dir. by Sébastien Petretti)	
The Tea Break (5mins, Dir. by Sara Jordan)	Best Short Film
Redistributors (82mins, Dir. by Adrian Tanner)	Welsh Dragon Award
Little Birds (12mins, Dir. by Anita Hawser)	
Lies We Tell (109mins, Dir. by Mitu Misra)	Best Feature Film, Best Music (Zbigniew Preisner), Best Actor (Gabriel Byrne), Best Actress (Sibylla Deen), Best Supporting Actor (Jan Uddin)
Dark Beacon (109mins, Dir. by Coz Greenop)	Best Cinematography (Haider Zafar), Best Director, Best Supporting Actress (Lynne Anne Rodgers)

=== 2018 International Film Festival of Wales Official Selection and Award winners ===
2018 Film Nominees (16 Films)	Award Winners
Judge Me (3mins, Dir. by Ashleigh Harley)	
Magne (12mins, Dir. by Silvia Schmidt)	Best Music
Being Keegan (22mins, Dir. by Stephanie Zari)	Best Short Film, Best Actor (Stephen Graham)
Stiff Punch (16mins, Dir. by Sion Thomas)	
Billy (37mins, Dir. by Sam Tomlinson & Thomas Savoury)	
Reflection (11mins, Dir. by Mark Sanger)	
Grace (10mins, Dir. by David Amanor-Wilks)	
Winter Ridge (86mins, Dir. by Dom Lenoir)	Best Feature Film, Best Supporting Actress (Hannah Waddingham), Welsh Dragon Award
Wonderwall (7mins, Dir. by Alexander Denysenko)	
Laymun (5mins, Dir. by Catherine Prowse & Hannah Quinn)	
Us (13mins, Dir. by Will Darbyshire)	Best Director
Ar Gefn Y Ddraig (Riding the Dragon) (56mins, Dir. by Huw Erddyn)	
The Running Herd (4mins, Dir. by Arthur Fanget)	
Say My Name (84mins, Dir. by Jay Stern)	
Cumulus (9mins, Dir. by Ioan Holland)	Best Animation
The Price for Silence (112mins, Dir. by Tony Germinario)	Best Actress (Lynn Mancinelli), Best Supporting Actor (Emrhys Cooper)
Saira (Unproduced screenplay by John "Zeus" Kontoyannis)	Best Unproduced Screenplay

=== 2019 International Film Festival of Wales Official Selection and Award winners ===
2019 Film Nominees (16 Films)	Award Winners
Chopper (10mins, Dir. by Giorgos Kapsanakis)	Best Cinematography
Metamorphosis of a Maiko (8mins, Dir. by Antonio Celotto)	
Angor (4mins, Dir. by Paul Hanks)	
How Countries Fight Their Wars (2mins, Dir. by Thomas Loopstra & Maurice Baltissena)	
Scrable (14mins, Dir. by Anthony Hett)	Best Short Film
Can't Hide It (17mins, Dir. by Richard Miller)	Best Actress (Esther McAuley), Welsh Dragon Award
Bottle Boy (2mins, Dir. by Tony Burke)	
About Steven (2mins, Dir. by Daniela Kampka & Phil Janke)	
IOLYN [YOL-IN] (15mins, Dir. by Glen Gair)	
I'm Scared (1min, Dir. by Zhou Wang)	
End is Near (3mins, Dir. by Rachael Olga Lloyd)	
Overkill (10mins, Dir. by Ross Donald)	
Planning the Funeral (7mins, Dir. by Doug Rollins)	Best Supporting Actor (Patrick Knox)
The Art of Reducing Noise (4mins, Dir. by Heidi Stokes)	
This Time Away (14mins, Dir. by Magali Barbe)	Best Supporting Actress
Philophobia (125mins, Dir. by Guy Davies)	Best Feature Film, Best Director, Best Actor (Joshua Glenister)
A Most Dangerous Child (Unproduced screenplay by Julian Shaw)	Best Unproduced Screenplay
Frames (Unproduced screenplay by Neil O'Neil)	
The Distance of Mercy (Unproduced screenplay by Shelly Drancik)	
The Water King (Unproduced screenplay by Persephone Vandegrift)	
Brennhausen (Unproduced screenplay by Diana Cignoni)	
El Punk (Unproduced screenplay by Tony Cammarata)	
Succubus (Unproduced screenplay by David Keogh)	

=== 2020 International Film Festival of Wales Official Selection and Award winners ===
2020 Film Nominees (30 Films)	Award Winners
Pink Opaque (90mins, Dir. by Derrick Perry)	Best Feature Film, Best Actor (Elijah Boothe)
SUBMISSION (116mins, Dir. by Leonarda Antonio)	
Ups and Downs (60mins, Dir. by Eoin Cleland)	
2 in a Million (4mins, Dir. by J. A. Moreno)	
244 Years Later (2mins, Dir. by Greg Berman)	
A Broken-Hearted Solstice (12mins, Dir. by Fanny Lefort)	
A Thousand Ways to Kiss the Ground (22mins, Dir. by Henna Taylor)	
ALINA (25mins, Dir. by Rami Kodeih)	
ANNA (15mins, Dir. by Dekel Berensonn)	
Audio of Apologies (4mins, Dir. by Yuri+Ana)	
Cha (8mins, Dir. by Gagandeep Kalirai)	Best Animation
Cwch Deilen (7mins, Dir. by Efa Blosse-Mason)	
DANCE HOUSE KOGANE4422「Past & Future」(9mins, Dir. by Ryosuke Sato)	Best Documentary
Dilynwyr (3mins, Dir. by Joe Hurst & Joseff Morgan)	Best Phone Film
IL VESTITO (THE SUIT) (15mins, Dir. by Maurizio Ravallese)	
Kung Fu Express (4mins, Dir. by Cheng Guo)	
Lady Helen's Garden (6mins, Dir. by Carina Lopez)	Best Phone Film
Mars Colony (35mins, Dir. by Noël Fuzellier)	Best Short Film, Best Supporting Actor (Philippe Rebbot)
Me, My Germs and James (16mins, Dir. by Anastasiia Vorotniuk)	
No Body (5mins, Dir. by Haemin Ko)	
Planet Earth Calling Ana (20mins, Dir. by Fernando Bonelli)	Best Actress (Laia Manzanares)
Rat (2mins, Dir. by Luke Bather)	
Red Horizon (30mins, Dir. by T.C. Johnstone)	
SKIN (23mins, Dir. by Mateusz Znaniecki)	Best Student Film, Welsh Dragon Award
The Haunted Swordsman (16mins, Dir. by Kevin McTurk)	
THE PLUNGE (10mins, Dir. by Simon Ryninks)	Best Director
The Priest (17mins, Dir. by Michael Vukadinovich)	Best Supporting Actress (Mary Faber)
Violet Soda – Tangerine (4mins, Dir. by Denis Carrion)	
Work From Hole (1min, Dir. by Matt Zeqiri)	
Wrath (9mins, Dir. by Suri Grennell)	Best Cinematography
As The Moth Flies (Unproduced screenplay by Peter Eliot)	
Chancer (Unproduced screenplay by Mark Cainen)	Best Screenplay
Faithful Shadow (Unproduced screenplay by Kevin J. Howard)	
Just Jane (Unproduced screenplay by Carl Huebner)	
Review (Unproduced screenplay by Jonathan Zarantonello)	
The Lady Pirates (Unproduced screenplay by Theresa Anne Carey)	

=== 2021 International Film Festival of Wales Official Selection and Award winners ===
2021 Film Nominees (30 Films)	Award Winners
Lightships (102mins, Dir. by John Harrigan)	
The Art of Love (106mins, Dir. by Philippe Weibel)	Best Actress (Alexandra Gilbreath)
The Mother, The Son, The Rat, and The Gun (115mins, Dir. by Philip Larsen)	Best Feature Film, Best Director
2 Down (7mins, Dir. by Sam Farage)	
652-mile = 0 (or The Wonderful Convenience of Videocalling) (4mins, Dir. by Giulio Gobbetti)	
Aire (2mins, Dir. by Marc Lesperut)	
Andreas Wolff – Solo (7mins, Dir. by Sion R. Joseph)	
Angel (3mins, Dir. by Shannon Greer & Carl Quinn)	
Cysylltiad (Connection) (12mins, Dir. by Mared Rees)	Best Supporting Actress (Sian Reese-Williams)
Druids (14mins, Dir. by Shwan Nostrapour)	
Generation 328 (19mins, Dir. by Veranika Nikanava)	
HIDE (11mins, Dir. by Daniel Benjamin Gray)	
Just Friends (3mins, Dir. by Marc Lesperut)	Best Cinematography
Louder is Not Always Clearer (17mins, Dir. by Toby Cameron)	Best Sound Design
Nan (10mins, Dir. by Matt Allen)	
Never Over – Harry Keyworth (4mins, Dir. by Scott Chalmers)	Welsh Dragon Award
Oly. – "Pastlife" (4mins, Dir. by Katarzyna Sawicka)	
Outside the Box (9mins, Dir. by Ross Mackenzie)	
(PAUSE) (2mins, Dir. by Marcelo Ignacio Lagreze)	
Please Don't Stand Up When Room is in Motion (45mins, Dir. by Josh Bennett)	Rising Star Award
Portrait (13mins, Dir. by Keir Siewert)	
Prosperina – Boot (4mins, Dir. by Zach F. Evans)	Best Music Video
Shiney (15mins, Dir. by Paul Holbrook)	Best Supporting Actor (Bruce Jones)
Swansea Seagulls (3mins, Dir. by Elaine Artemieff)	
Take Control (15mins, Dir. by Luke Walters)	
The Conversation (11mins, Dir. by Daniel Paida Larsen)	Best Actor (Thomas Ottersen)
The Dreams of Lonely People (24mins, Dir. by Marek Leszczewski)	Best Student Film
The Important Day (20mins, Dir. by Olesia Aleinikova)	Best Short Film
The Removal (11mins, Dir. by Leonardo D'Andrea)	
Unnecessary Things (14mins, Dir. by Dmytro Lisenbart)	
Face Painters (Unproduced screenplay by Giovanni Sanseviero)	
LEGENDS (Unproduced screenplay by Danny Alex)	
The Greek Passage (Unproduced screenplay by Lorenzo Guarnieri)	
The Imbalance (Unproduced screenplay by Naomi Lisner)	
The Split (Unproduced screenplay by Nicola Green)	Best Screenplay

=== 2022 International Film Festival of Wales Official Selection and Award winners ===
2022 Film Nominees (11 Films)	Award Winners
5-STARS (4mins, Dir. by James Wei)	
Bright World – So It Goes (5mins, Dir. by Alexander Vlahos)	Best Music Video
Confession Day (19mins, Dir. by Ben Hooton)	Best Short Film, Best Director, Best Actress (Nathalie Codsi), Rising Star Award (Huw Huckstep)
Deloping (7mins, Dir. by Jon Olav Stokke)	
Frank (12mins, Dir. by Jesse Briton & Buddug Jones)	Best Actor (Frank Thomas), Welsh Dragon Award
HaMiffal (3mins, Dir. by Tal Uliel)	
Kids Games (10mins, Dir. by Bernabé Rico)	
Leonardo (8mins, Dir. by Anthony Hett)	
Sidetracking (18mins, Dir. by Marco De Rosso)	
The Blood of My Neighbor (4mins, Dir. by Ilan Zerrouki)	
The Foul (4mins, Dir. by James Button)	
Bite Back (Unproduced screenplay by Perry Wyatt)	
Ithir (Unproduced screenplay by Benjamin Keir)	
Limbo (Unproduced screenplay by Phil Hamer)	
Side Step (Unproduced screenplay by Phil Hamer)	Best Unproduced Screenplay
Werewolf Prison Break (Unproduced screenplay by Clementine Webb & James Uren)	

== See also ==
- British Independent Film Festival
- British Horror Film Festival
- British Animation Film Festival
