= The Wants =

The Wants may refer to:

- The Wants (album) by The Phantom Band
- The Wants (band), post-punk band
