= Julia Fox =

Italian-American actress and model (born 1990)

- Fox in 2026
- Born: Julia Francesca Fox; February 2, 1990 (age 36); Milan, Lombardy, Italy
- Occupations: Actress; model
- Years active: 2015–present
- Spouse: Peter Artemiev (m. 2018; div. 2020)
- Children: 1

Julia Francesca Fox (born February 2, 1990) is an Italian-American actress, model, and media personality. Her debut performance was in the 2019 film Uncut Gems, for which she was nominated for the Breakthrough Actor Award at the 2019 Gotham Awards. She is also known for her eccentric style and online presence.

In October 2023, Fox released her debut book, a memoir titled Down the Drain. She has since released a song by the same name. She also hosts a Spotify podcast with Niki Takesh, titled Forbidden Fruits.

== Early life ==
Fox was born in Milan to Gracie and Thomas Fox, an Italian mother and an American father, who worked as a contractor. The couple split up when Julia and her two siblings were children. Until Julia was six, she was raised by her grandfather in the small town of Saronno, outside of Milan, while her mother finished college. They lived in a one-bedroom apartment with her mother's family, a Catholic household. During this time, Fox's father lived on a boat docked off New York City. At age six, Julia moved to New York City to live with him in Manhattan's Yorkville neighborhood, but continued to visit her mother regularly in Italy.

At age 14, Fox moved back to Italy to stay with a host family near her mother's hometown and attend a private Catholic school. She was asked to leave the host family due to smoking and skipping school, and then lived alone in her mother's empty apartment for some time before returning to New York.

While growing up, Fox experienced periods of relative homelessness, and had difficult relationships with her parents. Her father was "volatile and verbally abusive," and her mother was "absent for long stretches" when Fox visited her, and the two also "fought explosively." At age 15, Julia left home to live with her boyfriend, a drug dealer. After he was imprisoned, she moved into a friend's home. She ended their relationship after he sent her a death threat that also targeted her family.

Fox worked several retail jobs as a teenager, including at a shoe store, ice cream shop, and pastry bakery. While attending City-As-School High School, she worked as a dominatrix for six months in the East Village, after discovering the job in a Craigslist "adult gigs" section. Fox also drank, partied, went clubbing, and was arrested several times. At age 15, she was caught shoplifting from Bloomingdale's and banned from the store. She was put on probation for three years for stealing and grand larceny for credit card fraud. After a suicide attempt at age 16, she was placed in a psychiatric ward, where she was diagnosed with borderline personality disorder. Fox also developed a heroin addiction. At age 17, she overdosed and had a near-death experience. Fox briefly attended the New School in New York City as a media studies major before dropping out.

== Career ==
=== Modeling, art, and fashion design ===
Fox started as a clothing designer and launched a successful women's knitwear luxury line, Franziska Fox, with her friend Briana Andalore. She also worked as a model, posing for the last nude edition of Playboy in 2015, and as an exhibiting painter and photographer. She self-published two books of photography, Symptomatic of a Relationship Gone Sour: Heartburn/Nausea, published in 2015, and PTSD, published in 2016. In 2017, Fox hosted an art exhibit titled "R.I.P. Julia Fox'", which featured silk canvases painted with her own blood.

She has since appeared in campaigns for Tiffany & Co., Diesel, Coach New York, and Supreme; and in editorials for CR Fashion Book, The Last, Office, Wonderland, Vogue, Vogue Italia, The Face, Paper, V, and Interview. She has also appeared on the covers of Vogue Czechoslovakia, Elle Brasil, and New York Magazine.

=== Acting ===
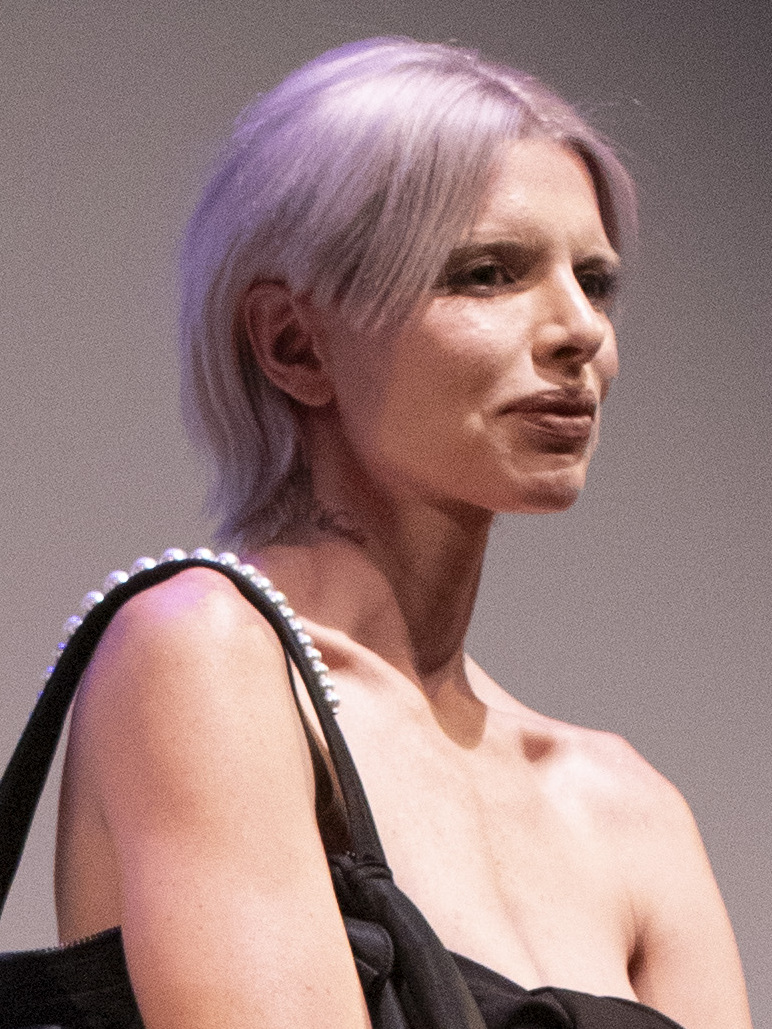
Fox at SXSW 2025

Fox made her feature film debut in the 2019 Safdie brothers A24 film Uncut Gems, playing a showroom saleswoman and mistress of the film's protagonist Howard Ratner (played by Adam Sandler), an erratic jewelry dealer and gambling addict. Fox had known the Safdie brothers for almost a decade after meeting Josh Safdie through a chance encounter at a café in SoHo, Manhattan. She was subsequently nominated for Breakthrough Actor in the 2019 Gotham Awards.

She starred in Ben Hozie's PVT Chat, playing a cam girl named Scarlet. The film was released in the United States on February 5, 2021. She also starred in No Sudden Move which released in the United States on July 1, 2021. She starred in the drama movie Puppet, which was released in late 2022.

Fox starred in the 2024 dark comedy The Trainer opposite Vito Schnabel and Steven Van Zandt, directed by Tony Kaye. She appeared in the 2025 film HIM directed by Justin Tipping and co-produced by Jordan Peele.

In 2024, Fox starred in the American TV-series Fantasmas. In 2025, Fox guest starred in Adults. In March 2025, Fox starred in the American ensemble comedy film Idiotka and was credited as an executive producer. She starred in the 2025 Netflix ensemble film Night Always Comes.

In 2026 she will appear in Northbound, a road trip comedy with Bruce Dern, Hunter Parrish, and Joanna Cassidy. Fox is also set to star in the 2026 sapphic romance, Perfect, opposite Ashley Moore and Micaela Wittman. In 2026 she is set to star in the action-thriller, The Deputy, alongside Tiffany Haddish and William H. Macy.

=== Other work ===
Fox wrote and directed Fantasy Girls, a short film about a group of teenage girls involved in sex work living in Reno, Nevada, which was released in 2021. In 2022, Fox was an executive producer on the Canadian film Something You Said Last Night.

Fox was previously a co-owner and investor of a nightclub on the Lower East Side named Happy Ending, which closed in 2013.

In October 2023, her memoir Down the Drain was published by Simon & Schuster. She drew inspiration from William S. Burroughs' Junkie, James Frey's A Million Little Pieces, and David Sedaris' Naked. The memoir will be developed into a TV series by Joey Soloway.

In February 2024, she performed her debut song, which shares the same name as the title of her 2023 memoir, at Charli XCX's Party Girl DJ warehouse rave set for the Boiler Room. Variety included "Down the Drain" in their Worst Songs of 2024 list. Later that year, Charli XCX paid tribute to Fox on her single "360", declaring "I'm so Julia", a nod to her ubiquity in pop culture.

== Personal life ==
In November 2018, Fox married Peter Artemiev. They resided together in Yorkville, Manhattan. Their divorce was finalized in July 2020. Their son was born in 2021.

In October 2022, she stated that she experienced postpartum depression. She also has obsessive–compulsive disorder, and ADHD, and she is autistic.

In 2019, a close friend of Fox's died of a fentanyl overdose. Fox has spoken about how her friend's death influenced her to remain sober.

In an article she wrote for Interview in January 2022, Fox confirmed that she was dating rapper Kanye West. The two broke up the following month. Shortly after the break-up, a doctored headline claiming the relationship ended due to West's dislike of her going "goblin mode" went viral online, prompting the phrase "goblin mode" to become widely used. Fox confirmed that the headline was false.

Julia Fox became celibate sometime in late 2021 or early 2022. She first publicly revealed this decision on May 11, 2024, in a comment under a TikTok video. Fox's abstinence began when she felt like she was "done with men" after giving dating her "best shot". After Roe v. Wade was overturned in June 2022, she said she turned her abstinence into a "subtle rebellion".

In July 2024, Fox publicly identified herself as a lesbian in a TikTok video, though the statement was made humorously. She later stated in an August 2025 Allure profile that she is in fact pansexual, and claimed that "If it were just down to the physical, I'm more attracted to the female body. Men don't do it for me at all [physically], but I can be attracted to a man's mind. I'm a vibes person".

In October 2025, Fox received backlash for dressing in a bloody replica of the pink Chanel suit that First Lady Jacqueline Kennedy was wearing when her husband, President John F. Kennedy, was assassinated. Fox wore the suit to a Halloween party in New York City. She defended herself on Instagram by writing that it was "a statement." She wrote, "[Jacqueline's] decision not to change clothes, even after being encouraged to, was an act of extraordinary bravery. It was performance, protest, and mourning all at once. A woman weaponizing image and grace to expose brutality. It's about trauma, power, and how femininity itself is a form of resistance."

== Filmography ==
=== Film ===
Key
†	Denotes films that have not yet been released

Year	Title	Role	Notes
2019	Uncut Gems	Julia De Fiore	
2020	PVT Chat	Scarlet	
2021	No Sudden Move	Vanessa Capelli	
2022	Something You Said Last Night	—N/a	Executive producer
2024	Presence	Cece	
2024	The Trainer	Bee Luciani	
2025	Idiotka	Emma Wexler	Also executive producer
2025	Night Always Comes	Gloria	
2025	Him	Elsie White	
2026	The Moment	Herself	
2026	Perfect	Mallory	Also executive producer
2026	One Night Only	Skye	
2026	Clashing Through the Snow †		Post-production

=== Television ===
Year	Title	Role	Notes
2020	Acting for a Cause	Titania / Hippolyta	Episode: "A Midsummer Night's Dream"
2022	Ziwe	Herself	Episode: "Men!"
2024	Fantasmas	Mrs. Claus	Episode: "Toilets”
2025–present	Adults	Herself	2 episodes
2025	Elsbeth	Raquel Drabowski	Episode: "Good Grief"

=== Music videos ===
Year	Title	Artist
2019	"JackBoys"	JackBoys
2020	"Nothing Good"	Goody Grace featuring G-Eazy and Juicy J
2023	"Nothing Lasts Forever"	Sevdaliza and Grimes
2024	"360"	Charli XCX

== Awards and nominations ==
Year	Nominated work	Award	Category	Result	Ref.
2019	Uncut Gems	Chicago Film Critics Association	Most Promising Performer	Nominated	
2019	Uncut Gems	Georgia Film Critics Association	Breakthrough Award	Nominated	
2019	Uncut Gems	Gotham Awards	Breakthrough Actor	Nominated	
2019	Uncut Gems	Toronto Film Critics Association	Best Supporting Actress	Nominated	
