= Ben Hozie =

American musician and filmmaker

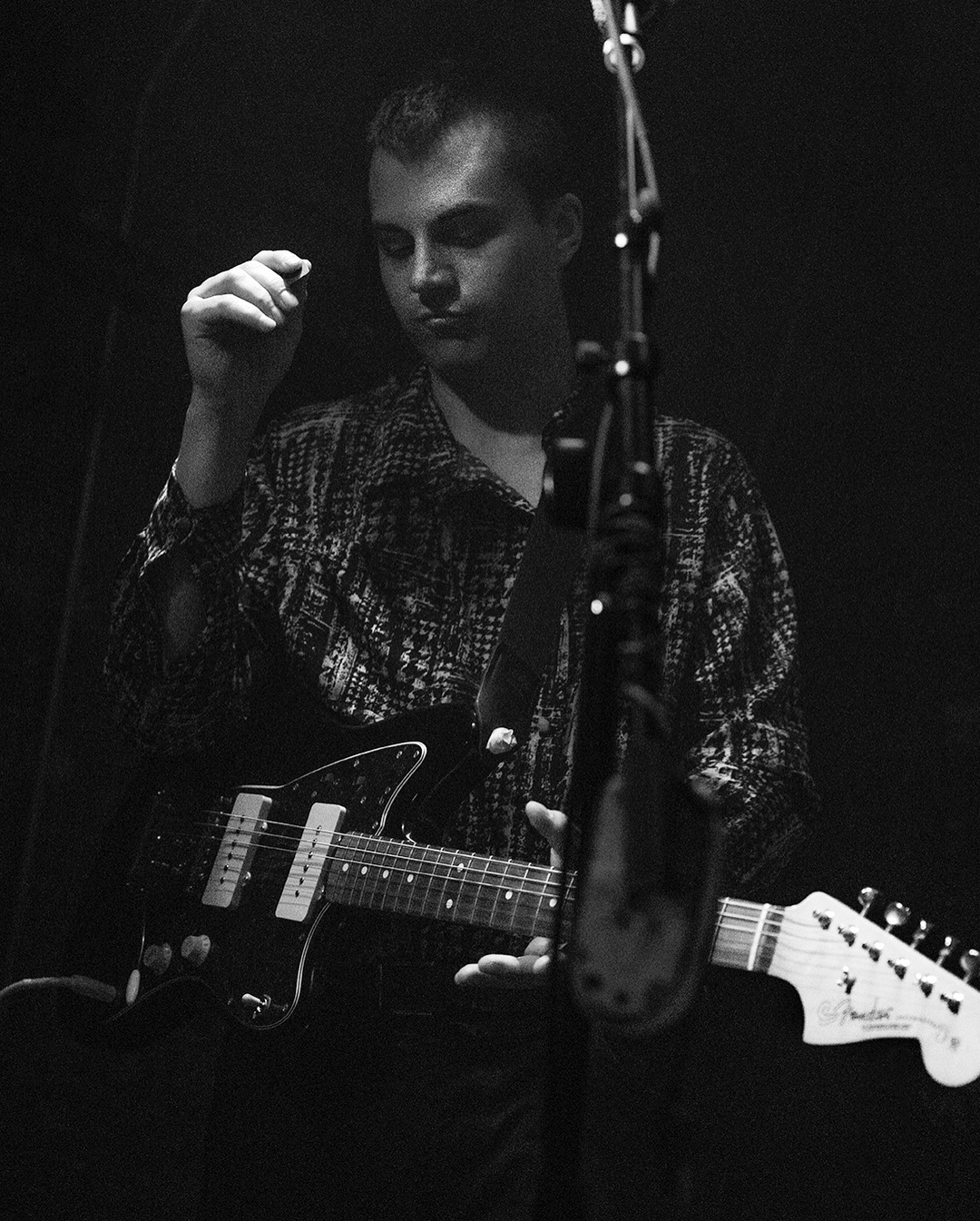
- Occupations: Writer; director; musician; cinematographer; editor; producer
- Years active: 2014–present
- Musical career
- Genres: Punk rock
- Instruments: Vocals; guitarist
- Labels: What's Your Rupture?

Ben Hozie is an American film director and musician. He is the vocalist and guitarist for the band Bodega. He is best known for his work on PVT Chat.

== Career ==
Ben Hozie directed his first film Annunciation in 2011 (released 2014). Annunciation is an adaptation of the early northern renaissance Mérode Altarpiece triptych. The film also features footage of Occupy Wall Street. His second feature film, The Lion's Den (2017), is an experimental political farce about a group of Staten Island radicals who kidnap a wall street banker. His third film, PVT Chat (2020), starring Peter Vack and Julia Fox, premiered at the Fantasia International Film Festival.

== Filmography ==
Year	Title	Contribution	Note
2014	Annunciation	Writer, director, editor and producer	
2017	The Lion's Den	Writer, director, editor and cinematographer	
2020	PVT Chat	Writer, director, editor, cinematographer and actor	

== Discography ==
=== Studio albums ===
- Endless Scroll
- Shiny New Model
