= Bodega (American band) =

American rock band

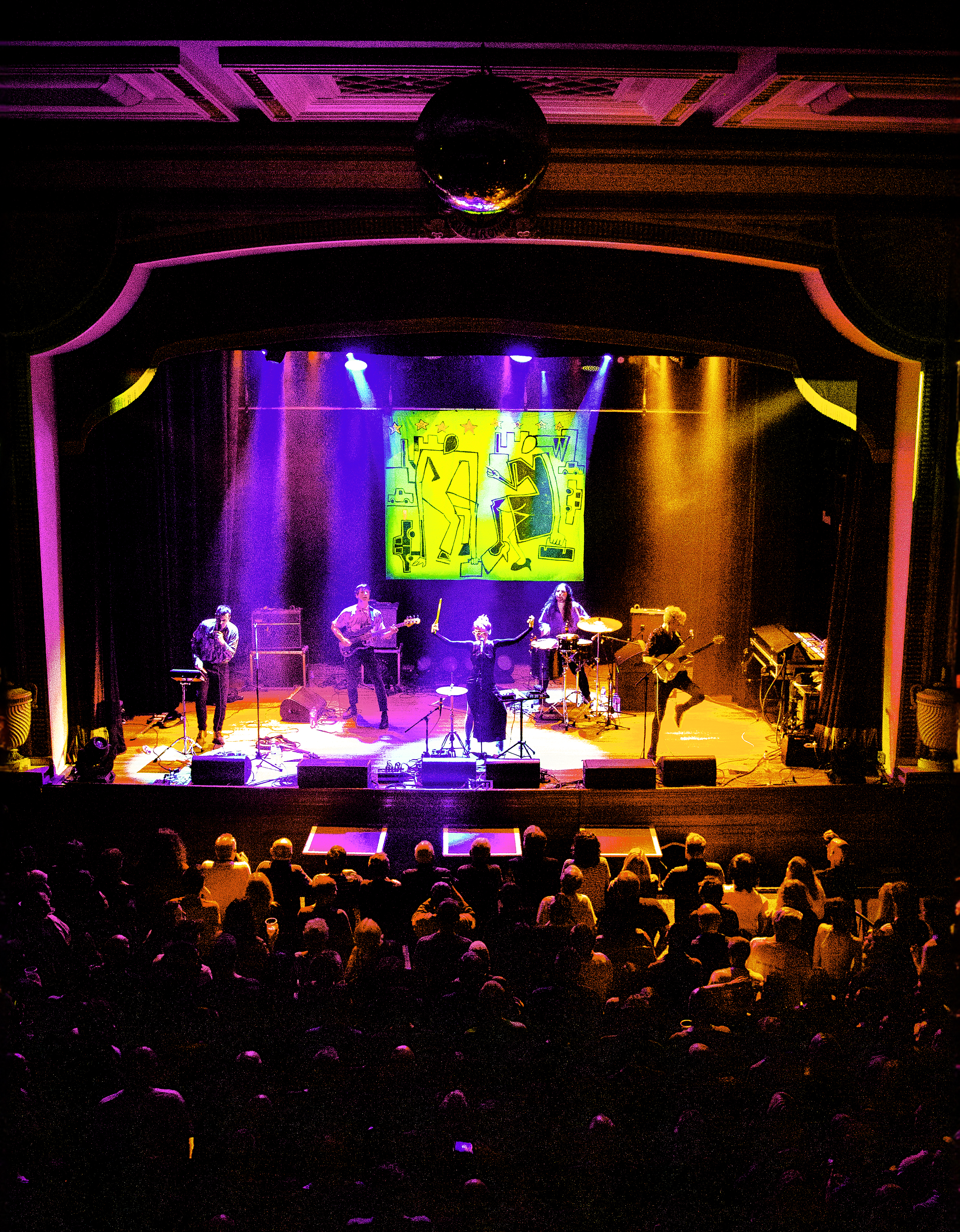
- Bodega at Islington Assembly Hall, 2022 (Credit: James Winstanley)

Background information
- Origin: New York City, New York, U.S.
- Genres: Art rock; art punk; indie rock; post punk
- Years active: 2014–present
- Labels: What's Your Rupture?; Chrysalis
- Spinoffs: The Wants; Flossing
- Members: Ben Hozie; Nikki Belfiglio; Dan Ryan; Adam See; Adam Shumski
- Past members: Montana Simone; Heather Elle; Madison Velding-VanDam; Tai Lee
- Website: bodega-band.com

Bodega (stylized in all caps) is an American art rock band from New York City.

== History ==
The band's name is inspired by the term used for small corner shops in New York City. They released their first full-length album in 2018, titled Endless Scroll. The album was produced by Parquet Courts member Austin Brown and released through record label What's Your Rupture? In 2019, Bodega released their first EP titled Shiny New Model. The band was scheduled to play at the 2024 South by Southwest festival in Austin, Texas, but pulled out citing the festival's financial ties with the US Army and RTX Corporation.

== Members ==
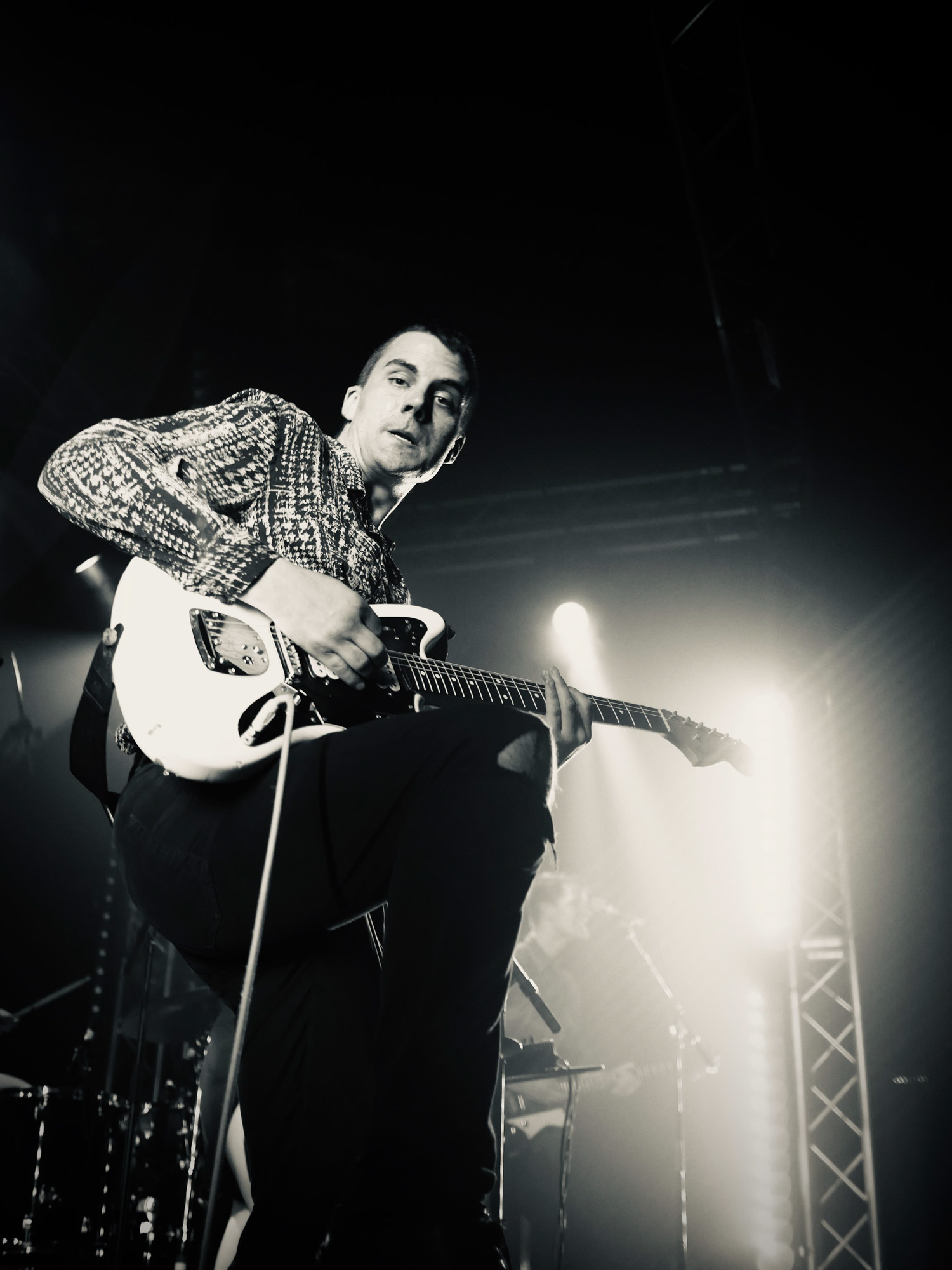
Ben Hozie at The Dome, Tufnell Park, London in 2018

=== Current members ===
- Ben Hozie – vocals, guitar
- Nikki Belfiglio – vocals, percussion, sampling
- Dan Ryan – lead guitar
- Adam See – bass
- Adam Shumski – drums

=== Past members ===
- Montana Simone – stand-up percussion
- Madison Velding-VanDam – guitar
- Heather Elle – bass
- Tai Lee – stand-up percussion

== Discography ==
=== Studio albums ===
Title	Album details	Peak chart positions		
Title	Album details	UK	UK Indie	SCO
Endless Scroll	Released: 6 July 2018; Label: What's Your Rupture?; Cat. No: WYR0118CD; Format: LP, CD, streaming, digital download	72	3	47
Broken Equipment	Released: 11 March 2022; Label: What's Your Rupture?; Cat. No: WYR122CD; Format: LP, CD, streaming, digital download	—	6	16
Our Brand Could Be Yr Life	Released: 12 April 2024; Label: Chrysalis; Cat. No: BRC126; Format: LP, CD, streaming, digital download	—	4	15
Rot in Helvetica	Released: 18 July 2025; Format: LP, streaming, digital download	—	—	—
All Inside Aquarium	Released: 9 October 2026			

=== Extended plays ===
Title	Album details	Peak chart positions	
Title	Album details	UK Indie	SCO
Shiny New Model	Released: 11 October 2019; Label: What's Your Rupture?; Cat. No: WYR0119CD; Format: CD, streaming, digital download	25	64

=== Singles ===
- Statuette on the Console (2022, What's Your Rupture?)

=== Live albums ===
- Witness Scroll (2019, What's Your Rupture?) (LPWYR123C)

=== Bonus tracks albums ===
- Xtra Equipment (2022, What's Your Rupture?)
