= Micaela Wittman =

American actress and writer

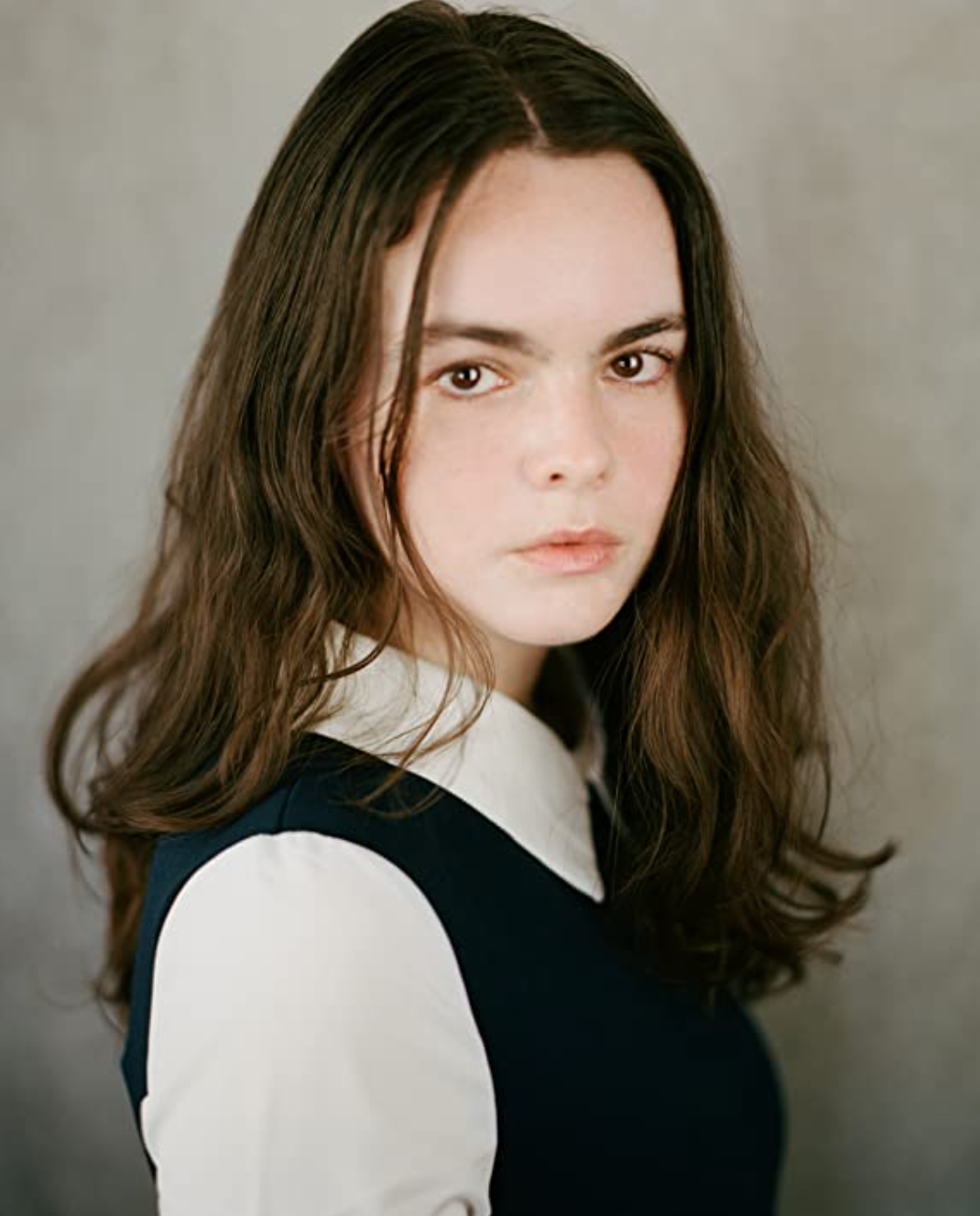
- Born: Rhinebeck, New York, U.S.
- Occupation: Actress
- Years active: 2021–present

Micaela Wittman is an American actress and writer known for her work in network TV shows and independent films. She was named one of three female up-and-comers in "The Next Act" series by V Magazine and Hedi Slimane.

== Early life ==
Wittman was born in Rhinebeck, New York and raised in Arizona. She was raised as a Jehovah's Witness in a strict family before deciding to drop out of high school to pursue her acting career.

== Career ==
Wittman is known for her titular role in the mockumentary film Clairevoyant (2021) which was nominated for a British Independent Film Festival award. Most of the interview segments in the film were shot over the course of one day and later edited together to form the basis of the script. Made on a budget of 3,000 dollars in the run-and-gun tradition, it was later sold internationally at the Marché du Film at Cannes after six months of production, mainly shot on the weekends. Because of her ability to make independent films, Wonderland Magazine cited her as an "indie film goddess".

In 2022 she published the coming of age novel, Remy & Arletta, which was based on a true story about two teenagers who lean on their friendship to get through troubling teenage years. It was adapted into a film which premiered at Outfest 2022, before being released in theaters fall of 2023. The story chronicles her own relationship with her alcoholic and abusive mother, and incorporates her experience as a Jehovah's Witness. Because of Remy & Arletta, V Magazine included her in the annual "The Next Act" series, a project photographed by Hedi Slimane, stating that Wittman is "primed for success." In July 2024, it was announced she launched her own production company, Manic film productions, alongside Arthur de Larroche, to further facilitate the creation of her films.

Additionally, Wittman recurred as Tara Raeken, the sister of Theo Raeken, in the MTV supernatural drama Teen Wolf. She also appeared as Gretchen in ABC’s Modern Family, Maggie in the Netflix film Shirley, and a satirical version of Katie Holmes in A.P. Bio.

In August 2024 it was announced she will be starring opposite Julia Fox in the LGBTQ drama Perfect. In January 2025, it was announced she would be reteaming with director Arthur de Larroche to star in the comedy drama, We're Already There, leading an ensemble cast including Truman Hanks, Marc Rebillet, Jon Bass, and Jessica Baglow.

=== Modeling ===
In 2022, Wittman began modeling with a Celine campaign. Afterwards, she went on to model for brands such as Armani and Tory Burch. She is represented by Elite Model Management's U.S. division, The Society.
