= British Horror Film Festival =

Film festival

- Location: London, England
- Founded: 2010; 16 years ago
- Language: English
- Website: Official website

The British Horror Film Festival (BHFF) is an independent film festival that takes place annually in the United Kingdom and is one of four events hosted by the Film Festival Guild, including the British Animation Film Festival, the British Independent Film Festival and the International Film Festival of Wales. Founded in 2010, the festival celebrates the horror and thriller genres in film, both international and British horror films. The festival has previously been held in various locations throughout England, starting with Bournemouth in 2010 before having its roots in London, which most often screened at the Empire/Cineworld in Leicester Square before moving to the British Museum in 2022. The British Horror Film Festival has featured a number of notable films and filmmakers including Prano Bailey-Bond, who won the British Horror Award (best achievement on a low budget) alongside co-director Jennifer Eiss for the short film Short Lease as well as a Best Actress win for Marysia Kay.

The festival includes screenings with features, short films, music videos and student films. BHFF also recognises the achievements of filmmakers through awards in various categories, including Best Feature, Best Short, Best Director, and Best Actor/Actress amongst others.

The festival has attracted a growing audience of horror film fans, filmmakers and industry professionals over the years. In October 2022, the British Horror Film Festival was held at the British Museum and was sold-out at full capacity.

In addition to its typical in-person events, the British Horror Film Festival was also hosted online in 2020 and 2021 due to the COVID-19 pandemic.

== Awards (2010-) ==
=== 2010 British Horror Film Festival Official Selection & Award Winners ===
2010 Film Nominees (8 Films)	Award Winners
Mutant Land (4mins, Dir. by Phil Tippett)	Best Short Film
Nursery Crimes (4mins, Dir. by L. Whyte)	Audience Award
Short Lease (14mins, Dir. by Prano Bailey-Bond & Jennifer Eiss)	Best Actress (Marysia Kay), British Horror Award
Roadkill (20mins)	Best Student Short
Needle (90mins, Dir. by John V. Soto)	Best Cinematography, Best Special Effects, Best Supporting Actress (Jessica Marais)
Devil's Playground (92mins, Dir. by Mark McQueen)	Best Feature Film, Best Actor (Danny Dyer), Best Director, Best Producer (Jonathon Sothcott, Freddie Hutton & Bart Ruspoli)
Black Death (102mins, Dir. by Dean Francis)	
Voodoo Lagoon (79mins, Dir. by Nick Cohen)	Best Supporting Actor (John Noble)
Unseen (Unproduced screenplay by Kristi Barnett)	Best Unproduced Screenplay

=== 2011 British Horror Film Festival Official Selection & Award Winners ===
2011 Film Nominees (12 Films)	Award Winners
The Reverend (98mins, Dir. by Neil Jones)	
Kill Keith (93mins, Dir. by Andy Thompson)	Best Music
Tell Him Next Year (12mins, Dir. by David Margolis)	Best Short Film
Solving Problems (14mins, Dir. by Filipe Maciel)	
Merry Little Christmas (20mins, Dir. by Jose Manuel Marin Minguez)	
Rise of the Appliances (10mins, Dir. by Rob Sprackling)	British Horror Award
Le Miroir (8mins, Dir. by Sebastian Rossignol)	
Envy the Dead (10mins, Dir. by Isa Swain)	
Facing Rupert (6mins, Dir. by Gregory Erdstein)	
The Holding (89mins, Dir. by Susan Jacobson)	Best Cinematography, Best Actor (Vincent Regan), Best Actress (Kierston Wareing)
Stalker (77mins, Dir. by Martin Kemp)	Best Feature Film, Best Supporting Actor (Billy Murray), Best Director
The Hike (83mins, Dir. by Rupert Bryan)	Best Supporting Actress (Barbara Nedeljakova)
The Unseen (Unproduced screenplay by Dan Clifton)	Best Unproduced Screenplay

=== 2012 British Horror Film Festival Official Selection & Award Winners ===
2012 Film Nominees (15 Films)	Award Winners
Demon (90mins, Dir. by Mark Duffield)	Best Cinematography, Best Actress (Clare Langford)
Three's A Shroud (77mins, Dir. by Dan Brownlie, David V. G. Davies & Andy Edwards)	British Horror Award
Art of Darkness (90mins, Dir. by Steve Laurence)	Best Feature Film, Best Music
Darkwood Manor (96mins, Dir. by Liam Hooper)	Best Student Film
Love Bug (13mins, Dir. by Benjamin Kent)	Best Short Film, Best Actor (Thomas Coombes)
One Night in Sutherland Hill (7mins, Dir. by Michael Callaghan)	
Shoreditch Slayer (2mins, Dir. by Simon Levene)	
The Deadfall (25mins, Dir. by Nic Alderton)	
The Tunnel (5mins, Dir. by Ivan Radovic)	
Mother Died (7mins, Dir. by Neill Gorton)	
Between Friends (11mins, Dir. by Gerhardt Slawitschka)	
Just the 2 of Us (13mins, Dir. by Mat Brooks)	
Beneath (13mins, Dir. by Al White)	
Trid An Stoirm (8mins, Dir. by Fred Burdy)	
The Other Side (20mins, Dir. by The Santoro Brothers)	Best Director, Audience Award
Blood and Fangs: The Bloodening (Unproduced screenplay by Dave McLeod)	Best Unproduced Screenplay

=== 2013 British Horror Film Festival Official Selection & Award Winners ===
2013 Film Nominees (18 Films)	Award Winners
Fortune Cookie Prophecies (113mins, Dir. by Henry Li)	
Spira (10mins, Dir. by Jon James Smith)	
Tumbling After (6mins, Dir. by Nicholas Humphries)	Best Short Film
Left Hand Billy in the Second Solution (30mins, Dir. by Gabriele Zuccarini)	
82 (6mins, Dir. by Calum Macdiarmid)	
Honeymoon Suite (14mins, Dir. by Zao Wang)	Best Cinematography
The Meeting (16mins, Dir. by Karen Lam)	
Moment of Clarity (2mins, Dir. by James Fisher)	
In the House of Flies (89mins, Dir. by Gabriel Carrer)	
Belly of the Wolf (21mins, Dir. by Mark Fisher)	Best Actor (Finn Morrell), Best Director, British Horror Award
Dia De Los Muertos (12mins, Dir. by Gigi Saul Guerrero)	Best Actress (Adelita Rockhill)
Vengeance Rhythm (3mins, Dir. by Christopher Ullens)	
Sleep Now in the Fire (21mins, Dir. by Sean Pollaro & Elliot Pollaro)	
Happy Birthday Mr. Zombie (7mins, Dir. by David Leclercq)	
Lonely Hearts (11mins, Dir. by Leon Chambers)	
Decapoda Shock (9mins, Dir. by Javier Chillon)	Best Music
Lot254 (2mins, Dir. by Toby Meakins)	
Entity (87mins, Dir. by Steve Stone)	Best Feature Film
Department 18 (Unproduced screenplay by Mick Sims)	Best Unproduced Screenplay

=== 2014 British Horror Film Festival Official Selection & Award Winners ===
2014 Film Nominees (9 Films)	Award Winners
Apocalyptic (84mins, Dir. by Glen Trigs)	Best Feature Film
The Scopia Effect (130mins, Dir. by Christopher Butler)	Best Cinematography
Dans Le Noir (12mins, Dir. by Kate Tuck)	British Horror Award
The Brain Hack (18mins, Dir. by Joseph White)	Best Short Film, Best Music, Best Actor (Edward Franklin)
The End (8mins, Dir. by Raj Pathak)	Best Actress (Shelley Draper)
The Jigsaw (8mins, Dir. by Sibling Films)	
The Stomach (15mins, Dir. by Ben Steiner)	
Tin and Tina (12mins, Dir. by Rubin Stein)	
Judas Ghost (75mins, Dir. by Simon Pearce)	Best Director
Regression (Unproduced screenplay by Shannon Hile & Richard Eden)	Best Unproduced Screenplay

=== 2015 British Horror Film Festival Official Selection & Award Winners ===
2015 Film Nominees (9 Films)	Award Winners
Chrysalis (100mins, Dir. by John Klein)	Best Feature, Best Supporting Actress (Tanya Thai McBridge)
The Substitute (20mins, Dir. by Nathan Hughes-Berry)	Best Supporting Actor (Ben Kerfoot)
The Herd (20mins, Dir. by Melanie Light)	Best Cinematography
El Gigante (16mins, Dir. by Gigi Saul Guerrero)	
NOCT (15mins, Dir. by Vincent Toujas)	
Do Not Disturb (13mins, Dir. by Jon James Smith)	Best Music
Quiet Zone (9mins, Dir. by Andrew Iondies)	Best Short Film
Curse of the Phoenix (91mins, Dir. by Robert Young)	Best Actor (Joseph Sentence)
Demon Baby (70mins, Dir. by Coz Greenop)	Best Actress (Carina Biurrell), Best Director, British Horror Award
Dead West (Unproduced screenplay by Jeff Kussmann)	Best Unproduced Screenplay
The Walls (Unproduced screenplay by Kristi Barnett)	Best Unproduced Screenplay (Honourable Mention)

=== 2016 British Horror Film Festival Official Selection & Award Winners ===
2016 Film Nominees (13 Films)	Award Winners
Capture Kill Release (95mins, Dir. by Nick McAnulty & Brian Allan Stewart)	
Death Walks (95mins, Dir. by Spencer Hawken)	Best Music, Best Supporting Actor (Jon Guerriero)
Girl #2 (9mins, Dir. by David Jeffery)	
Gene (10mins, Dir. by Nick Padley)	
FlySpy (21mins, Dir. by Daniel M. Smith)	
Chaste (10mins, Dir. by Mike Jones)	Best Short Film
Forget Me Not (9mins, Dir. by Andreas Avgousti)	
Summoned (6mins, Dir. by Victoria Angell)	
Playback (4mins, Dir. by Nathan Crooker)	
The Barber's Cut (12mins, Dir. by Mike Brocking)	British Horror Award
Under the Bed (2mins, Dir. by James Mansell)	
I Lived Here (6mins, Dir. by Martin Laurence)	
Fractured (80mins, Dir. by Jamie Patterson)	Best Feature Film, Best Cinematography, Best Actor (Karl Davies), Best Actress (April Pearson), Best Supporting Actress (Louisa Lytton), Best Director
Killer App v.2.0 (Unproduced screenplay by Joseph Ferrante)	Best Unproduced Screenplay

=== 2017 British Horror Film Festival Official Selection & Award Winners ===
2017 Film Nominees (24 Films)	Award Winners
Devil Town (15mins, Dir. by Nick Barrett)	
Caught (75mins, Dir. by Jamie Patterson)	Best Cinematography (Paul O’Callaghan), Best Supporting Actress (April Pearson)
Health, Wealth & Happiness (11mins, Dir. by Nic Alderton)	
Redwood (75mins, Dir. by Tom Paton)	Best Actor (Mike Beckingham), Best Actress (Tatjana Nardone)
Delicious Perspectives (11mins, Dir. by Antonio Padovani)	
Once Upon a Time at Christmas (75mins, Dir. by Christopher Jolley)	
Salient Minus Ten (13mins, Dir. by Emma Dark)	
NightmARes (3mins, Dir. by James Mansell)	
The Unwilling (76mins, Dir. by Jonathan Heap)	Best Supporting Actor (Lance Henricksen)
Happy Anniversary (6mins, Dir. by Mark Kuczewski)	
Glasshole (3mins, Dir. by Jonathan Brooks)	British Horror Award
Buzzard Hollow Beef (76mins, Dir. by Joshua M. Johnson)	
Dead Cool (19mins, Dir. by Simon Ross)	Best Short Film
Nothing to Declare (8mins, Dir. by Will Adams)	
Shortcut (5mins, Dir. by Prano Bailey-Bond)	
Roadkiller (13mins, Dir. by Kate Cheeseman)	
The Last Halloween (10mins, Dir. by Marc Roussel)	
I am Not the Devil (9mins, Dir. by Samuel Smith)	
Mayflower (7mins, Dir. by Christopher Goodman)	
Goodnight, Gracie (4mins, Dir. by Stellan Kendrick)	
Blindman's Lane (13mins, Dir. by Diego Indraccolo & Alive Gatti)	
Savor (1min, Dir. by Marc Cartwright)	
In Extremis (93mins, Dir. by Steve Stone)	Best Feature Film, Best Music (John Koutselinis), Best Director
Steven Berkoff's Tell Tale Heart (80mins, Dir. by Stephen Cookson)	

=== 2018 British Horror Film Festival Official Selection & Award Winners ===
2018 Film Nominees (13 Films)	Award Winners
The Familiar Fingers of Culture (20mins, Dir. by Conscian Morgan)	Best Actress (Emma Connell)
Another Game (9mins, Dir. by Riyad Barmania)	Best Director
First (9mins, Dir. by Darcia Martin)	Best Music
The Entity (7mins, Dir. by Martin Laurence)	
Meat (7mins, Dir. by Josef Bates)	British Horror Award
Oscar's Bell (12mins, Dir. by Chris Cronin)	Best Short Film, Best Actor (Paul Bullion)
Sweetie (11mins, Dir. by Ethan Evans & Sean Toshach)	
All You Can Carry (11mins, Dir. by Andrew Rose)	Best Student Film, Best Cinematography
Rearview (4mins, Dir. by Chase Casanova)	
Doris (12mins, Dir. by Hayder Hasen)	
Baghead (15mins, Dir. by Alberto Corredor Marina)	Best Supporting Actor (Julian Seager), Best Supporting Actress (Natalie Oliver)
There's A Monster Behind You (10mins, Dir. by Evan Richards)	
Isabelle (80mins, Dir. by Rob Heydon)	Best Feature Film
Amen Evil, The Possession (Unproduced screenplay by Steven Williams)	Best Unproduced Screenplay

=== 2019 British Horror Film Festival Official Selection & Award Winners ===
2019 Film Nominees (25 Films)	Award Winners
Creaker (4mins, Dir. by Vidar T. Aune)	
The Séance (14mins, Dir. by Anthony R. Smith)	Best Short Film
The Chippie (8mins, Dir. by Louis Norton Selzer)	
Roommates (6mins, Dir. by Louis Lagayette)	
Self Help (14mins, Dir. by Dan Storey)	Best Supporting Actor (Frederick Roll)
Fever (8mins, Dir. by Brian Rosenthal)	
Be Good (15mins, Dir. by James Lawes)	Best Director
JobSquirrel (4mins, Dir. by Gary Sundt)	
The Muffin Man (2mins, Dir. by Ethan Blum)	
Eject (9mins, Dir. by David Yorke)	British Horror Award
Parcels – Withorwithout (7mins, Dir. by Benjamin Howdeshell)	
Wither (4mins, Dir. by Ethan Evans)	
Nero (9mins, Dir. by Jan-David Bolt)	
Chain (19mins, Dir. by Christopher Reith)	
#NO_FILTER (7mins, Dir. by Michael Dupret)	Best Cinematography
Foxtails Brigade – We Are Not Ourselves (4mins, Dir. by Dominic Mercurio)	Best Music Video
Dillon (11mins, Dir. by Mark Hammill)	Best Actor (Patrick O’Halloran)
Infracktion (11mins, Dir. by Jack Brookman)	Best Student Film
ODDKO – Disobey (4mins, Dir. by Giovanni Bucci)	
Little Monsters (5mins, Dir. by Simon Harris)	
Child (11mins, Dir. by Ben Kent)	Best Actress (Rebecca Turner), Best Supporting Actress (Ellie Dickens)
Limbo (14mins, Dir. by Daniel Viqueira)	
Fire Lies (4mins, Dir. by Dominic Hassall)	Best Music
The Jack in the Box (85mins, Dir. by Lawrence Fowler)	Best Feature Film
UK Haunters (151mins, Dir. by Dan Brownlie)	
Condemned (Unproduced screenplay)	
Farang (Unproduced screenplay)	
The Remote (Unproduced screenplay)	
Delirium (Unproduced screenplay)	
Vessels (Unproduced screenplay)	
M – Demon Killer (Unproduced screenplay)	
Limpet (Unproduced screenplay by Mark Brown)	Best Unproduced Screenplay

=== 2020 British Horror Film Festival Official Selection & Award Winners ===
2020 Film Nominees (21 Films)	Award Winners
8 (75mins, Dir. by Harold Holscher)	Best Feature Film, Best Music, Best Actor (Tshamano Sebe)
Til Freddy (72mins, Dir. by Viljar Bøe)	
Exit (21mins, Dir. by Ivan Basov)	Best Student Film, Best Supporting Actor (Anatoly Gushin), British Horror Award
Fleshgod Apocalypse – Monnalisa (6mins, Dir. by Giovanni Bucci)	
Gholü (2mins, Dir. by Leo Nicholson)	Best Music Video
Gold (5mins, Dir. by Gi Gonzales)	
Green Cobra (14mins, Dir. by Sigurd Culhane)	Best Short Film, Best Director
Live Forever (3mins, Dir. by Gustav Egerstedt)	
Mermaid in a Jar (5mins, Dir. by Malakias)	
Misha (8mins, Dir. by Andrew Jeffrey)	Best Actress (Daiva Johnston)
OverKill (15mins, Dir. by Alex Montilla)	
Payback (7mins, Dir. by Sidney Van Den Hout)	
Platform (8mins, Dir. by Mark Pluck)	Rising Star Award
Polter (10mins, Dir. by Álvaro Vicario)	Best Sound Design
Snake Dick (8mins, Dir. by David Mahmoudieh)	Best Cinematography, Best Supporting Actress (Sierra Pond)
Sorcerer (6mins, Dir. by Tom Hughes)	
Struwwelerror (45mins, Dir. by Lenny Heller)	
Swipe (6mins, Dir. by Niels Bourgonje)	
The Altruist (35mins, Dir. by Matt Smith)	
The History of Monsters (20mins, Dir. by Juan Pablo Arias Muñoz)	
Work Sample (9mins, Dir. by Garry Savenkov)	
Faithful Shadow (Unproduced screenplay by Kevin J. Howard)	
Study in Blue (Unproduced screenplay by Patrick Clement)	
The Fallout (Unproduced screenplay by Dominic Flanagan)	Best Unproduced Screenplay
The Harvest (Unproduced screenplay by Steven Wishnoff)	
The Psycho Path (Unproduced screenplay by Johnathan Dinkin & Catherine Brinkworth)	
Wicked Season (Unproduced Screenplay by Amy Acosta)	

=== 2021 British Horror Film Festival Official Selection & Award Winners ===
2021 Film Nominees (45 Films)	Award Winners
Masking Threshold (91mins, Dir. by Johannes Grenzfurthner)	Best Feature Film
The Jack in the Box: Awakening (93mins, Dir. by Lawrence Fowler)	
AXIS – Larwood & Koh (3mins, Dir. by Luke Dale)	
Believe (14mins, Dir. by Peter Stead)	
Cannibalism (14mins, Dir. by Diego R. Aballe)	
Crossing (20mins, Dir. by Ruslan Bosenko)	
Dead End Drive (15mins, Dir. by Alexander Yellen)	
Don't Answer (8mins, Dir. by Artturi Olavi Rostén & Sara Nieminen)	
Echoes (3mins, Dir. by Zak Harney)	
EJE (Blood) (15mins, Dir. by Fabian Adeoye Lojede)	
Evolutionary (15mins, Dir. by Oliver Crawford)	
Familiar (10mins, Dir. by David J. Ellison)	
First Time (3mins, Dir. by Euan Foulis)	
Flesh and Blood (6mins, Dir. by Brian Ivie)	
Griffica (12mins, Dir. by C.J. Arellano)	Rising Star Award
Haunted (4mins, Dir. by Robin DUC)	
Hunger (15mins, Dir. by Carlos Meléndez)	
Iris (25mins, Dir. by Tomás García & Ezequiel Degastaldi Ciccone)	
It's Bedtime (3mins, Dir. by Sadjad Frogh)	
Korean Ghost Story (15mins, Dir. by Minsun Park & Teddy Tenenbaum)	Best Short Film, Best Supporting Actress (Lyrica Okano)
Long Pig (9mins, Dir. by Riccardo Suriano)	
My Castle, My Home (15mins, Dir. by José Mira)	
My Dead Husband (15mins, Dir. by Blake Ridder)	
Nevermore (7mins, Dir. by Sheida Sheikhha)	
No Game Like Foxes (12mins, Dir. by Raphael Arkera)	
Odds (3mins, Dir. by A. D. Cooper)	
Once Familiar (11mins, Dir. by Rubén González)	
Panic (4mins, Dir. by Alexander Weber & Victor Jim Moye-Noza)	Best Music Video
Perfect Match (5mins, Dir. by Marc Schießer)	
Peter the Penguin (9mins, Dir. by Andrew Rutter)	Best Director, Best Supporting Actor (Peter Terry)
Serial Dating (12mins, Dir. by Eric C. Castro)	
She and the Darkness (13mins, Dir. by Daniel Romero)	Best Cinematography, Best Actress (Beatriz Arjona)
Sleepaway – The Wildhearts (5mins, Dir. by Justin Griffiths)	
Smiles (13mins, Dir. by Javier Chavanel)	
Survivors (7mins, Harry Kirby & George Kirby)	
Tekenchu (9mins, Dir. by Carlos Matienzo Serment)	
The Bottom (9mins, Dir. by Morgan Ruaidhrí O'Sullivan & James Kautz)	Best Actor (James Kautz)
The Corridor (5mins, Dir. by James Mansell)	
The Deluge (15mins, Dir. by Daniel Booth)	British Horror Award
The Gloom (14mins, Dir. by Dani Viqueira)	
The Lake Parasite (15mins, Dir. by Joe Reilly)	
The Nick (5mins, Dir. by Robert Smellin)	
The Nicky Nack (6mins, Dir. by Tom Oxenham	Best Sound Design
The Sky Below (10mins, Dir. by Charlie Rose)	
You Will Never Be Back (14mins, Dir. by Mónica Mateo)	
Affordable Housing (Unproduced screenplay by Wi-Moto Nyoka)	
Bitter Harvest (Unproduced screenplay by John Munn)	
MOTEL (Unproduced screenplay by Jerry Sampson)	
Terror London (Unproduced screenplay by Terry Clark)	Best Unproduced Screenplay
The Onslaught (Unproduced screenplay by Oscar Barby & Gemma Esau)	

=== 2022 British Horror Film Festival Official Selection & Award Winners ===
2022 Film Nominees (8 Films)	Award Winners
The Evil is Inside (12mins, Dir. by Martin Sharpe)	
The Microscope (10mins, Dir. by Elliot Vick & Reuben Vick)	Best Short Film, Best Scare Award (Audience Voted)
Last Orders (21mins, Dir. by Jon James Smith)	Best Cinematography
Mantis (8mins, Dir. by Luigi Sibona)	Best Actress (Ann Samuel), British Horror Award, Fan Favourite Short Film (Audience Voted)
I. The Void (6mins, Dir. by Alexandros Papathanasopoulos)	
The Wilds (15mins, Dir. by Greig Johnson)	Best Supporting Actress (Nicola Bryant), Rising Star Award (Tom Bell)
Sucker (8mins, Dir. by Alix Austin)	Best Sound Design, Best of London Award (Sponsored by Werewolf Beer)
Feed Me (96mins, Dir. by Adam Leader & Richard Oakes)	Best Feature Film, Best Director, Best Music (Benjamin Symons), Best Actor (Christopher Mulvin), Best Supporting Actor (Neal Ward)
OREAD (Unproduced screenplay by Lee Copeland)	Best Unproduced Screenplay
Clown Hallow (Unproduced screenplay by Mark Giacomin)	Unproduced Screenplay Special Commendation
Daisy Daisy (Unproduced screenplay by Paul Harker)	Unproduced Screenplay Special Commendation
Mr. Bear Hugz (Unproduced screenplay by Armand Arekian)	Unproduced Screenplay Special Commendation
The Glamorgan Strangler: A Love Story (Unproduced screenplay by Lewis Carter)	Unproduced Screenplay Special Commendation
The Queens Gold (Unproduced screenplay by Kristen Humphrey-Taylor & John Vaughan)	Unproduced Screenplay Special Commendation

== See also ==
- British Independent Film Festival
- International Film Festival of Wales
- British Animation Film Festival
