= PVT Chat =

2020 film directed by Ben Hozie

- Film poster
- Directed by: Ben Hozie
- Screenplay by: Ben Hozie
- Produced by: Oliver David
- Starring: Heather Allison; Nikki Belfiglio; Austin Brown; Atticus Cain; Buddy Duress; Dasha Nekrasova; Julia Fox; Peter Vack
- Cinematography: Ben Hozie
- Edited by: Ben Hozie
- Music by: Austin Brown
- Production company: Pretorius Pictures
- Distributed by: Dark Star Pictures
- Release dates: August 21, 2020 (FanTasia); February 5, 2021 (United States)
- Running time: 86 minutes
- Country: United States
- Language: English

PVT Chat is a 2020 American erotic drama film, written and directed by Ben Hozie. It stars Peter Vack as an online gambler who becomes obsessed with a cam girl played by Julia Fox. PVT Chat premiered at the Fantasia International Film Festival on August 21, 2020.

== Plot ==
Jack is an internet gambler who lives in New York and becomes obsessed with Scarlet, a cam girl from San Francisco. His obsession reaches a boiling point when fantasy materializes into reality after Jack spots Scarlet on a rainy street in Chinatown.

== Cast ==
The cast include:

- Julia Fox as Scarlett
- Peter Vack as Jack
- Buddy Duress as Larry
- Dasha Nekrasova as QT4U
- Heather Allison as Gorgeous_357
- Nikki Belfiglio as Emma
- Austin Brown as himself
- Atticus Cain as Henry the Landlord
- Michelle Chu as Cam Girl
- Andrew Clark as Gallery bartender
- Oliver David as Drone Operator
- Ally Davis as Venus

== Production ==
=== Filming ===
The film was shot the last week of January through mid-February 2018 in New York City (Brooklyn, Queens, and Manhattan).

== Release ==
The film had its world premiere at the 2020 Fantasia International Film Festival. Distribution rights for United Kingdom and Ireland were acquired by Vertigo Releasing on November 17, 2020. Dark Star Pictures released the film in available theaters on February 5, 2021, followed by a VOD and Digital HD release on February 9, 2021.

== Reception ==
The review aggregator Rotten Tomatoes gives the film a 63% approval rating based on 41 reviews, with an average rating of 6.10/10. The website's critics consensus reads: "Its intelligent and nuanced approach to potentially salacious material is refreshing, but PVT Chat struggles to use it in service of a meaningful story." According to Metacritic, which sampled nine critics and calculated a weighted average score of 61 out of 100, the film received "generally favorable reviews".
