= Saving the Titanic =

- DVD cover art
- Written by: Colin Heber-Percy; Lyall Watson
- Directed by: Maurice Sweeney
- Starring: David Wilmot; Ciarán McMenamin
- Narrated by: Liam Cunningham
- Music by: Steve Lynch
- Countries of origin: Ireland; Germany
- Original language: English
- No. of episodes: 2 (TV version)

Production
- Executive producer: Stephen Rooke
- Producers: Keith Farrell; Reinhardt Beetz
- Cinematography: Stephen McNutt
- Editor: Barry Zetlin
- Running time: Original version 90 minutes TV version 2 x 50 minutes
- Production companies: Gebrueder Beetz Filmproduktion; Tile Films
- Budget: €1,600,000

Original release
- Release: 13 April 2012

Saving the Titanic, aired in Germany as Die Helden der Titanic, is 2012 Irish-German television docudrama directed by Maurice Sweeney, and written by Colin Heber-Percy and Lyall Watson. Unlike most films and series depicting the ship's passengers and senior crew, Saving the Titanic dramatizes the engineers and the boiler room crew who kept the furnaces and generators running as the Titanic sank, facilitating the survival of others.

"100 years after the sinking of the Titanic, Saving the Titanic is the untold story of the self-sacrifice and dignity of the ship’s engineers, stokers and firemen in the face of impending death."

== Cast ==
- Liam Cunningham - Narrator
- David Wilmot - Chief Engineer, Joseph Bell
- Ciarán McMenamin - Leading Fireman, Frederick "Fred" Barrett
- Owen McDonnell - Trimmer, Thomas Patrick "Paddy" Dillion
- Hugh O'Conor - Junior Assistant Second Engineer, Jonathan Shepherd
- Andrew Simpson - Assistant Electrician, Albert George Ervine
- John Byrne - Assistant Electrician, Alfred Pirrie Middleton
- Chris Newman - Assistant Electrician, William Kelly
- Paul Kennedy - Junior Assistant Second Engineer, Herbert Gifford Harvey
- Douglas Rankine - Greaser, Alfred White
- Stephen Hogan - Thomas Andrews
- Conor MacNeill - Frank Bell
- Ciaran O'Grady - Leading Fireman
- Owen Roe - White Star Lawyer
- David Heap - White Star Official
- Dermot Magennis - Tailor
- Johnny Eveson - Second Officer Charles Lightoller
- Helen O'Reilly - Female Passenger

== Soundtrack ==
All music is composed by Steve Lynch

No.	Title	Length
1.	"The Code"	01:58
2.	"Religious Tensions"	00:46
3.	"Clean Brushes"	01:50
4.	"Opening the Letter"	00:59
5.	"The Most Luxurious Lifeboat in the World"	02:02
6.	"The Code Breaks"	01:22
7.	"Shepard's Theme"	01:26
8.	"Mounting Tensions Below Deck"	02:21
9.	"Firedrill"	01:44
10.	"The Reality of the Situation"	01:49
11.	"A Sinking Ship"	03:20
12.	"The Dust Settles"	01:49
Total length:		21:32

== Release ==
Saving the Titanic had a limited theatrical release in the United Kingdom, screening in 12 cinemas as part of the British Independent Film Festival. The film was also broadcast internationally; by May 2013, it was estimated that 10 million people had seen the film.

== Accolades ==
Year	Award	Category	Recipient(s)	Result	Ref.
2013	Irish Film and Television Awards	Best Script Drama	Colin Heber-Percy & Lyall Watson	Nominated	
2013	Irish Film and Television Awards	Best Editing	Mick Mahon	Nominated	
2013	Irish Film and Television Awards	Best Production Design	Ray Ball	Nominated	
2013	Irish Film and Television Awards	Best Original Score	Steve Lynch	Nominated	
2012	Dublin International Film Festival	Best Film (Audience Award)	Saving the Titanic	Nominated	
2013	British Independent Film Festival	Best Feature Film	Saving the Titanic	Won	
2013	British Independent Film Festival	Best Supporting Actor	Ciarán McMenamin	Won	
2013	British Independent Film Festival	Best Director	Maurice Sweeney	Won	
2013	Celtic Media Festival	Single Drama	Saving the Titanic	Won	
2012	Accolade Competition	Award of Excellence	Saving the Titanic	Won	

- Saving The Titanic at the IMDb database
