= Perfect (2026 film) =

2026 American drama film

- Directed by: Millicent Hailes
- Written by: Kendra A Miller; Millicent Hailes
- Produced by: Millicent Hailes; Nathan Scherrer; Tara Sheree; Tyler Payne; Liz Cardenas; Douglas Riggs
- Starring: Julia Fox; Ashley Moore; Lío Mehiel; Micaela Wittman; Ryder McLaughlin; Kate Moennig; Creed Bratton
- Cinematography: Ksusha Genenfeld
- Edited by: Amber Bansak
- Music by: Wynne Bennet
- Production companies: Freenjoy; Steak and Rosé
- Release date: March 12, 2026 (SXSW)
- Running time: 94 minutes
- Country: United States
- Language: English

Perfect (stylized as PERFECT), is a 2026 American drama film directed, produced, and co-written by Millicent Hailes in her directorial debut. It stars Julia Fox, Ashley Moore, Lío Mehiel, Micaela Wittman, Ryder McLaughlin, Kate Moennig and Creed Bratton.

It had its world premiere at the 2026 South by Southwest Film & TV Festival on March 12, 2026.

== Premise ==
A wealthy pregnant woman falls in love with a woman starting her life over.

== Cast ==
- Julia Fox as Mallory
- Ashley Moore as Kai
- Lío Mehiel
- Micaela Wittman
- Ryder McLaughlin
- Kate Moennig
- Creed Bratton

== Production ==
In August 2024, it was announced Julia Fox, Ashley Moore, Micaela Wittman, and Lío Mehiel had joined the cast of the film, with Millicent Hailes directing from her screenplay co-written with Kendra A. Miller. Principal photography commenced in September. During production, Perfect was unionized with IATSE.

== Release ==
It had its world premiere at the 2026 South by Southwest Film & TV Festival on March 12, 2026.
