= Clairevoyant =

2021 American mockumentary film

- Directed by: Arthur de Larroche and Micaela Wittman
- Written by: Arthur de Larroche and Micaela Wittman
- Starring: Micaela Wittman; Arthur de Larroche; Amy Benedict; Sam Dissanayake; Anousha Nowbakht; Heidi Fecht
- Music by: Jordan Ezquerro
- Production company: Diennet Productions
- Release date: May 11, 2021 (British Independent Film Festival)
- Running time: 90 minutes
- Country: United States
- Language: English
- Budget: $3,000

Clairevoyant is a 2021 American mockumentary written and directed by Micaela Wittman and Arthur de Larroche, and starring Amy Benedict, Sam Dissanayake, Anousha Nowbakht, and Heidi Fecht.

Clairevoyant premiered at the British Independent Film Festival on May 11, 2021, and was nominated for Best Feature Film. The film was given a release in the United States by Gravitas Ventures in June 2021.

== Plot ==
The film follows a spoiled young woman named Claire (Micaela Wittman) who hires a cameraman (Arthur De Larroche) off of Craigslist to document her journey as she attempts to shed her ego and attain enlightenment.

== Cast ==
- Micaela Wittman as Claire
- Amy Benedict
- Sam Dissanayake
- Anousha Nowbakht
- Heidi Fecht
- Rhys Hyatt
- Andrew Kirkley
- Ashley Moret
- Anne Scottlin
- Emily Vere Nicoll

== Reception ==
On Rotten Tomatoes, the film has an approval rating of 78% based on reviews from 9 critics.

Made on a micro-budget of 3k, Michael Talbot-Haynes of Film Threat praised the film's ability to utilize being a Low-budget film to its advantage, "The film turns homage to the underground movies of yesteryear, where crazies with no money would achieve transcendence through costumes, light, and imagination."
