= Container (album) =

Studio album by The Wants
- Released: March 13, 2020
- Genres: Art punk; no wave; post-punk
- Length: 32:28
- Label: Council
- Producer: Madison Velding-VanDam

Singles from Container
- 1. "Clearly a Crisis" Released: May 3, 2019; 2. "Fear My Society" Released: August 21, 2019; 3. "The Motor" Released: January 8, 2020

Container is the debut studio album by American band The Wants. The album was released on March 13, 2020, through Council Records.

== Release and promotion ==
=== Singles ===
There were four singles released ahead of Container, two in 2019 and two in 2020. The lead off single, "Clearly a Crisis" was released on May 3, 2019. In August 2019, the second single, "Fear My Society" was released. The final two singles, "The Motor", and "Container", were released in early 2020 ahead of the March release of the album.

=== Music videos ===
Four music videos were released in promotion of the album. The first music video, for the single "Fear My Society", was released on August 22, 2019. The music video was directed Madison Carroll and Madison Velding-VanDam; Carroll did the cinematography for the album, and Velding-VanDam edited the video.

The second music video, for the song, "Aluminum" came out on March 20, 2020. The video was also directed and edited by bandmembers Velding-VanDam and Carroll. The music video for "The Motor" came out on May 27, 2020, while the fourth and final music video for the self-titled track, "Container", came out on October 28, 2021.

== Critical reception ==
Professional ratings
Aggregate scores
Source	Rating
Metacritic	75/100
Review scores
Source	Rating
DIY	3/5 stars
Line of Best Fit	9/10
Mojo	3/5 stars
NME	4/5 stars
PopMatters	7/10
Uncut	4/5 stars

Container received positive reviews from contemporary music critics. On review aggregator website, Metacritic, Container has an average professional critic score of 75 out of 100 indicating "generally favorable reviews based on six reviews". Hayley Milross, writing for Line of Best Fit gave Container a 9 out of 10 for its creativity against modern day indie rock and the attention to detail on the album. Milross summarized the album saying, the "debut is bold, daring and incredibly effective. Separating itself from the regular indie noise, Container is an album that tells a compound narrative while experimenting cleverly with fine attention to detail." Gary Ryan, of NME called the album "the soundtrack to a lockdown party", alluding to the album being released at the onset of the COVID-19 pandemic, saying that fans of Interpol, Depeche Mode, LCD Soundsystem, and Gang of Four would enjoy the album. Ryan gave the album four stars out of five.

Sarah Pope, writing for DIY gave the album a more mixed review, describing the album as derivative, and the band as "dystopian fetish club art-punk". Pope describe the album as a clash of nu wave and gothic rock, but summarized the album as when you "sense they were aiming for something a little more forward-thinking". Pope gave the album three stars out of five. Nadia Reid, writing for Mojo offered a mixed review, saying Container is "tightly wound but eminently danceable songs with an earnestness that can seem a bit po-faced." Reid also gave a three-star rating to Container.

== Track listing ==
No.	Title	Length
1.	"Ramp"	2:13
2.	"Container"	3:15
3.	"Machine Room"	0:53
4.	"Fear My Society"	3:24
5.	"The Motor"	3:16
6.	"Aluminum"	3:31
7.	"Ape Trap"	2:55
8.	"Waiting Room"	1:13
9.	"Clearly a Crisis"	3:08
10.	"Nuclear Party"	3:15
11.	"Hydra"	2:32
12.	"Voltage"	3:05
Total length:		32:28
