= The Trainer (film) =

2024 American drama film

- Directed by: Tony Kaye
- Written by: Vito Schnabel; Jeff Solomon
- Produced by: Tony Kaye; Vito Schnabel; Jeremy Steckler
- Starring: Vito Schnabel; Julia Fox; Steven Van Zandt; Beverly D'Angelo; Bella Thorne; Gina Gershon; Stephen Dorff; Lenny Kravitz; Paris Hilton; John McEnroe
- Cinematography: Tony Kaye
- Edited by: Bob Jenkis; Robert Lee; Sam Sneade
- Music by: Anne Dudley
- Production company: Artofficial
- Release date: October 20, 2024 (Rome Film Festival)
- Running time: 95 minutes
- Country: United States
- Language: English

The Trainer is a 2024 American black comedy film, directed and produced by Tony Kaye, from a screenplay by Vito Schnabel and Jeff Solomon. It stars Schnabel, Julia Fox, Steven Van Zandt, Beverly D'Angelo, Bella Thorne, Gina Gershon, Stephen Dorff, Lenny Kravitz, Paris Hilton and John McEnroe. The film's executive producers include Kevin Durant and Oliver Sarkozy.

The film had its world premiere at the 19th Rome Film Festival on October 20, 2024.

== Premise ==
Jack Flex is struggling to make ends meet as a socially awkward aspiring fitness influencer when a shopping network expresses an interest in marketing a project he has created, the Heavy Hat. The plot follows Jack's increasing stress and anxiety as he attempts to secure endorsements from celebrities and his struggles to find a company to manufacture his Heavy Hats at scale.

== Cast ==
- Vito Schnabel as Jack Flex
- Julia Fox as Bee
- Steven Van Zandt as Isaac Rabinowitz
- Beverly D'Angelo as Jack’s Mom
- Bella Thorne as Elektra
- Gina Gershon as Bob Campbell
- Stephen Dorff as Will
- Lenny Kravitz as himself
- Paris Hilton as herself
- John McEnroe as himself
- Taylour Paige as Bianca Slater
- Allan Góes as Kirk Myers
  - Myers also appears as himself
- Luka Sabbat as Luke
- Soo Joo Park as Simo
- Mona Yousefi
- Brock O'Hurn as a factory owner
- Laird Hamilton as John McEnroe's trainer
- Duke Nicholson as Timothée
- Gus Van Sant as himself
- Colleen Camp as Will’s Mom
- Gavin Rossdale as himself
- Lauren Sánchez as herself
- Gayle King as herself
- Sandra Seacat as herself
- Finneas O'Connell as himself
- Tony Kaye as Maimonides / The Backwards Guru
- Brad Pitt as himself
- Chris Rock as himself
- Snoop Dogg as himself
- Jason Momoa as himself
- Ai Weiwei as himself
- Don Lemon as himself
- Kevin Eubanks as himself
- Julian Schnabel as himself
- Bono as himself
- Sharon Stone as herself
- Nat Faxon as himself
- Brian Tyree Henry as himself
- Zar Amir Ebrahimi as herself
- Juicy J as himself
- Carla Bruni as herself
- Hans Ulrich Obrist as himself
- Evan Ross as himself
- Petite Meller as herself
- Michael Chow as himself
- Charlotte McKinney as herself
- Simon Carmody as himself
- Kevin Love as himself
- Bruno Bischofberger as himself
- Jacqueline Schnabel as herself
- Bob Colacello as himself
- Charles Bennett as himself
- Austin Brown as himself
- Greta Seacat as herself
- Alex Dellal as himself
- Aryeh Bourkoff as himself
- Erik Torstensson as himself
- Stavros Niarchos as himself

== Production ==
In March 2022, it was announced Vito Schnabel, Julia Fox, Steven Van Zandt, and Taylour Paige had joined the cast of the film, with Tony Kaye directing from a screenplay by Schnabel and Jeff Solomon. In April 2022, Stephen Dorff, John McEnroe, Gina Gershon, Luka Sabbat, Soo Joo Park, Brock O'Hurn, Bella Thorne, Laird Hamilton and Duke Nicholson joined the cast. In May 2022, Gus Van Sant, Lenny Kravitz, Beverly D'Angelo, Colleen Camp and Gavin Rossdale joined the cast. In June 2022, Paris Hilton, Finneas O'Connell, Gayle King, Sandra Seacat and Lauren Sánchez joined the cast.

Principal photography began in April 2022.

== Release ==
It had its world premiere at the 19th Rome Film Festival on October 20, 2024. It also screened at Tribeca Festival on June 7, 2025.
