= Vito Schnabel =

American art dealer

- Born: July 27, 1986 (age 39); New York City, U.S.
- Occupations: Art dealer, actor, writer, producer
- Father: Julian Schnabel
- Relatives: Stella Schnabel (sister)
- Website: vitoschnabel.com

Vito Schnabel (born July 27, 1986) is an American art dealer, actor, writer, and producer. He is the owner of Vito Schnabel Gallery, which has locations in New York and St. Moritz, Switzerland.

== Life and career ==
Vito Schnabel was born on July 27, 1986. He is the son of artist and filmmaker Julian Schnabel and designer Jacqueline Beaurang. He has two sisters and two half-brothers. Schnabel graduated from Saint Ann's School in Brooklyn and briefly attended Columbia University.

Schnabel organized his first exhibition—a group show in New York—in 2003 at the age of 16. In 2013, Schnabel opened his first gallery on Clarkson Street in Manhattan. In 2015, Vito Schnabel Gallery’s second location opened in St. Moritz. The gallery is located in the former gallery space of celebrated art dealer Bruno Bischofberger, a lifelong friend and mentor to Schnabel. The inaugural exhibition at the Swiss outpost of Vito Schnabel Gallery was Urs Fischer: Bruno & Yoyo.

In 2021, Vito Schnabel Gallery opened a gallery on West 19th Street in New York’s Chelsea Arts District. Vito Schnabel Gallery operated a temporary exhibition space in the historic Old Santa Monica Post Office in Santa Monica, California from 2021 - 2023.

Schnabel works closely with Major Food Group, a restaurant group that operates restaurants such as Carbone and ZZ's Clam Bar. Schnabel partners with them in many of their ventures and curates the art in several of their restaurants.

Schnabel is also a filmmaker. Schnabel produced and starred in the feature film The Trainer (2024), a dark comedy based on an original story by Schnabel and co-written with Jeff Solomon. The Trainer is directed by Tony Kaye and stars Schnabel along with a large ensemble cast.

Schnabel is producer of In the Hand of Dante, an upcoming American-Italian drama film, written and directed by Julian Schnabel. It is based upon the novel of the same name by Nick Tosches. It stars Oscar Isaac, Jason Momoa, Gerard Butler and Gal Gadot. Martin Scorsese serves as an executive producer. In Feb 2024, Schnabel appeared in Ryan Murphy's series Feud: Capote vs. The Swans as "Rick" opposite Tom Hollander as Truman Capote.
