= British Independent Film Festival =

Annual film festival in the United Kingdom

- Location: London, England
- Founded: 2010; 16 years ago
- Language: English
- Website: https://www.filmfestivalguild.com/

The British Independent Film Festival (BIFF) is an independent film festival that takes place annually in the United Kingdom and is one of four events hosted by the Film Festival Guild, including the British Animation Film Festival, the International Film Festival of Wales and the British Horror Film Festival. Founded in 2010, the festival aims to showcase independent films from around the world with a particular focus on British talent. The festival has previously been held in various locations throughout England, including Bournemouth, Poole, and Bury St Edmunds, but has its roots at home in London, most often screening at the Cineworld in Leicester Square. The festival has become a highly anticipated event in the UK film calendar and has featured a number of notable films and filmmakers including Sian Clifford, James Cosmo, Emily Mortimer, Doug Milsome BSC ASC, Ryan Gage, April Pearson, Laura Whitmore and Jason Flemyng.

The festival has gained a reputation for showcasing a wide range of independent films and supporting emerging talent in the film industry with filmmaker Q&A sessions and awards ceremony. Award categories include Best Feature Film, Best Short, Best Music Video, Best Director and Best Actor/Actress amongst others.

In addition to its typical in-person events, the British Independent Film Festival was also hosted online in 2020 and 2021 due to the COVID-19 pandemic. The British Independent Film Festival recently took place at the British Museum in May 2023.

== Awards (2010-) ==
=== 2010 British Independent Film Festival Official Selection & Award Winners ===
2010 Film Nominees (16 Films)	Award Winners
Mr. Bojagi (10mins, Dir. by Marco Van Belle)	Best Actor (Brian Blessed), British Lion Award
Tenner (12mins, Dir. by David O’Neill)	Best Up & Coming Director
Brennan's Sacrament (20mins, Dir. by Erik Kentta)	Best Student Film
When the Rain Comes (14mins, Dir. by Jade Bell)	Best Young Actress (Holly Gibbs)
Edward's Turmoil (10mins, Dir. by Kim Albright)	Best Young Actor (Raphael Coleman)
A Very British Cult (20mins, Dir. by Adam Oldroyd)	Best Comedy
Noirville (13mins, Dir. by Andy Marsh)	Special Recognition Award
Spoiler (14mins, Dir. by Ed Whitmore)	Best Sound Design
Wish 143 (24mins, Dir. by Ian Barnes)	Best Short Film
Ketchup (12mins, Dir. by Wenchung Lu)	Best Animation
Father's Day (21mins, Dir. by Brian Rolling)	Best Up & Coming Producer
Would You Like Me to Remind You (3mins, Dir. by Shannon Jennisson)	Best Music Video
Ambleton Delight (110mins, Dir. by Daniel Parkes)	Best Feature Film
Ana Begins (80mins, Dir. by Ben O’Connor)	Best Actress (Ana Begins)
One Day in Cochin (95mins, Dir. by Tom Peirce)	Best Cinematography
Remnants of a War (56mins, Dir. by Jawad Metni)	Best Documentary
Him Upstairs (Unproduced screenplay by Sonya Quayle & Neil Mooney)	Best New Unproduced Screenplay

=== 2011 British Independent Film Festival Official Selection & Award Winners ===
2011 Film Nominees (26 Films)	Award Winners
Little White Lies	
Way Back When	
Broken Glass (Dir. by Adam Wareham)	
The Birthday Circle	
The Birdman of Tamworth	
Vacant Possession (Dir. by Rob MacGillivray)	
Lay Down and Die	
Jericho (Dir. by Liam Gavin)	
Paperman (Dir. by Richard Kelly)	
Do Men Die of Cancer or Embarrassment	
Moths	
Watching	Best Short Film Actor (Ian Hart)
Best Before (Dir. by Mark Boggis)	
Alleyman (Dir. by Andrew Ellinas)	British Lion Award
For Alan (Dir. by Dimi Nakov)	
A Little Brighter	
SIS (Dir. by Deborah Haywood)	
The Last Duel (Dir. by David Landau)	Best Short Film
Dan: Driven to Succeed (Dir. by Tom Greenidge)	Best Documentary
Take Your Medicine	Best Music Video
Love at First Sight (Dir. by Michael Davies)	Best Short Film Actress
Risen (113mins, Dir. by Neil Jones)	
Masterpiece (100mins, Dir. by Andrew Charles Tanner)	Best Actor (Mark Paul Wake)
Whatever Happened to Pete Blaggit? (94mins, Dir. by Mark Jeavons)	Best Feature Film
Lovelorn (86mins, Dir. by Becky Preston)	Best Cinematography
The Calling	Best Actress (Emily Beecham)
Body Count 1968 (Unproduced screenplay by Martha Pinson)	Best New Screenplay

=== 2012 British Independent Film Festival Official Selection & Award Winners ===
2012 Film Nominees (14 Films)	Award Winners
The Extraordinary Life of Rocky (14mins, Dir. by Kevin Meul)	Best Short Film
Babysitting (20mins, Dir. by Sam Hoare)	
The Anorak Brigade (7mins, Dir. by James Copson)	
Callum (10mins, Dir. by Michael Van Der Put)	
The Uncertainty Principle (8mins, Dir. by Oliver Smyth)	
A Love Story in Milk (3mins, Dir. by Danann Breathnack)	
Lab Rats (20mins, Dir. by Sam Washington)	
The Firing Squad (6mins, Dir. by Erik Sandoval)	
The Stand In (14mins, Dir. by Ricky Lloyd George)	
Airborne (81mins, Dir. by Alexander Williams)	British Lion Award
Jump (75mins, Dir. by Bindu De Stoppani)	Best Feature Film, Best Cinematography, Best Actress (Claire Price), Best Supporting Actor (Enzo Scanzi), Best Director
Irvine Welsh's Ecstasy (99mins, Dir. by Rob Heydon)	
Flutter (86mins, Dir. by Giles Borg)	Best Screenplay (Stephen Leslie)
Bashment (110mins, Dir. by Rikki Beadle-Blair)	Best Music, Best Actor (Nathan Clough), Best Supporting Actress (Jennifer Daley)
The Poisoned Mind of Walter Halfpenny (Unproduced screenplay by Miranda Sen)	Best New Screenplay

=== 2013 British Independent Film Festival Official Selection & Award Winners ===
2013 Film Nominees (16 Films)	Award Winners
Amores Passageiros (23mins, Dir. by Augusto Canani)	
Father/Son (10mins, Dir. by Bryan Reisberg)	
Happy Birthday Jim (5mins, Dir. by Giles Ripley)	
The Horseman (7mins, Dir. by Samuel Bailey)	
Foxes (15mins, Dir. by Lorcan Finnegan)	
The Wend (15mins, Dir. by Daniel Farah)	
The Voorman Problem (12mins, Dir. by Mark Gill)	
Indoor (15mins, Dir. by Simon Atkinson & Adam Townley)	Best Short Film
Rotkop (18mins, Dir. by Jan & Raf Roosens)	
Driftwood (11mins, Dir. by James Webber)	Best Cinematography
The Runner (3mins, Dir. by Michael O’Kelly)	
Take Me to Pitcairn (55mins, Dir. by Julian McDonnell)	
Dead Cat (93mins, Dir. by Stefan Georgiou)	Best Music, Best Actress (Sophia Dawnay), Best Director, British Lion Award
Saving the Titanic (104mins, Dir. by Maurice Sweeney)	Best Feature Film, Best Supporting Actor (Ciaran McMenamin), Best Director
Geezas (90mins, Dir. by Simon Kassianides & Mark Jackson)	Best Actor (Mark Jackson), Best Supporting Actress (Myia Ingoldsby)
Sanctuary (90mins, Dir. by Norah McGettigan)	
Him Upstairs (Unproduced screenplay by Sonya Quayle & Neil Mooney)	Best New Screenplay

=== 2014 British Independent Film Festival Official Selection & Award Winners ===
2014 Film Nominees (22 Films)	Award Winners
Mannequins (9mins, Dir. by Isabelle Sieb)	
Bodies in Irreversible Detriment (25mins, Dir. by Leon Chambers)	
Directionless (4mins, Dir. by James Button)	
Dear Someone (4mins, Dir. by Tetsuo Kamata)	
The Spin Cycle (10mins, Dir. by Joshua Wood)	
Boxer on the Wilderness (7mins, Dir. by Alexandra Boyd)	
Glance (3mins, Dir. by Chris Rule & Ben White)	
Puzzled (8mins, Dir. by Oliver Kember)	British Lion Award
Job (10mins, Dir. by Alex Horsfall)	
We Are Rhino (22mins, Dir. by Spencer Austin)	
Sleeping Dogs (85mins, Dir. by Floris Ramaekers)	Best Cinematography
Know How (105mins, Dir. by Juan Carlos Pineiro Escoriaza)	
The Reckoning (85mins, Dir. by John V. Soto)	Best Music, Best Director
Desire (9mins, Dir. by Leon Ockenden)	
Tout Doit Disparaitre (12mins, Dir. by Emmanuel Courcol)	
Vis A Vis (17mins, Dir. by Dan Connolly)	Best Short Film
Blackout (5mins, Dir. by Sharron Mirsky)	
Lonely Hearts (11mins, Dir. by Leon Chambers)	
Korn: Never Never (4mins, Dir. Giovanni Bucci)	
Making Ends Meat (5mins, Dir. by Alex Horsfall)	
NobblyCarrot7 (21mins, Dir. by Josh Allott)	Best Actress (Verity Mullan Wilkinson)
Top Dog (100mins, Dir. by Martin Kemp)	Best Feature Film, Best Actor (Leo Gregory), Best Supporting Actor (Ricci Harnett), Best Supporting Actress (Lorraine Stanley)
Divine (Unproduced Screenplay by Janice Hallett)	Best New Screenplay
A Dose of Reality (Unproduced Screenplay by John Broadhead)	Best New Screenplay (Honourable Mention)

=== 2015 British Independent Film Festival Official Selection & Award Winners ===
2015 Film Nominees (14 Films)	Award Winners
Solitary (90mins, Dir. by Sasha Krane)	
JORDANNE (5mins, Dir. by Zak Razvi)	
COMMAND-OPTION-DUMP (5mins, Dir. by Jonathan Flint)	Best Actor (Jared Fortune)
A Plea for Grimsby (16mins, Dir. by Preston Thompson)	Best Cinematography
Claire (3mins, Dir. by Jessica Banzing & Maximilian Geriach)	
Things I Have Learned About Sex and Dogs (7mins, Dir. by Janet Duncan)	
Two Missing (16mins, Dir. by Claire Fowler)	
C.T.R.L. (3mins, Dir. by Mariana Conde)	
Violet (11mins, Dir. by Tom Long)	
RETCON (5mins, Dir. by Bensalem Mitchell)	
Me & You (7mins, Dir. by Jack Tew)	Best Short Film, Best Music
Unhallowed Ground (97mins, Dir. by Russell England)	Best Supporting Actor (Marcus Griffiths), Best Supporting Actress (Rachel Petladwala)
Night Bus (96mins, Dir. by Simon Baker)	Best Feature Film, Best Director
Run Away with Me (80mins, Dir. by Eren Özkural)	Best Actress (Rosie MacPherson), British Lion Award
Dance of the Blessed Spirits (Unproduced screenplay by Matt Pacini)	Best New Screenplay
The Devil and Maddison Rose (Unproduced screenplay by Geof Ryan)	Best New Screenplay (Honourable Mention)

=== 2016 British Independent Film Festival Official Selection & Award Winners ===
2016 Film Nominees (16 Films)	Award Winners
The Chameleon (117mins, Dir. by Jim Greayer)	Best Feature Film, Best Cinematography, Best Actress (Sarah-Jane Potts)
Angel of Decay (116mins, Dir. by Jamie Crawford)	Best Actor (Ryan Gage)
Twenty Twenty-Four (88mins, Dir. by Richard Mundy)	
Is It Dead Yet (7mins, Dir. by Kelly Wenham & Matt Bailey)	Best Supporting Actress (Kate O’Brien)
Last Base (15mins, Dir. by Aslak Danbolt)	Best Student Film
People of Nowhere (2mins, Dir. by Lior Sperandeo)	
David Mills (3mins, Dir. by Jeric Pimentel)	
HOLE (19mins, Dir. by Mike Callaghan)	British Lion Award
One of These Days (5mins, Dir. by Franklyn Banks)	
The Big, The Bad and The Bunny (3mins, Dir. by Minji Sohn)	
Twine (20mins, Dir. by Richard Heap)	Best Short Film, Best Supporting Actor (Dylan Smith), Best Director
Silver Girl (6mins, Dir. by Min Reid)	
What Do You Desire (4mins, Dir. by Bruno Downey)	
Not Sophie's Choice (7mins, Dir. by Matt Holt)	
The Head Hunter (87mins, Dir. by Tom Keeling)	
Miss in Her Teens (80mins, Dir. by Matthew Butler)	Best Music
People of Nowhere (Dir. by Lior Sperandeo)	Best Music Video
Queensgate (Unproduced screenplay by Nevada McPherson)	Best Unproduced Screenplay

=== 2017 British Independent Film Festival Official Selection & Award Winners ===
2017 Film Nominees (20 Films)	Award Winners
Love Life (18mins, Dir. by Amanda Brennan)	
Wilderness (84mins, Dir. by Justin John Doherty)	Best Actress (Katharine Davenport)
Trust Me (20mins, Dir. by Gyulyara Meliki)	
Happy Birthday Toby Simpson (81mins, Dir. by Patrick Makin)	Best Feature Film, Best Music, Best Actor (Alexander Perkins)
On Paper (18mins, Dir. by Nicholas Nazari)	
The Great Unwashed (82mins, Dir. by Louis Fonoseca)	
Stalkers (1min, Dir. by Fred Tilby-Jones)	
Run It Off (14mins, Dir. by Liam O’Hara)	
Ten Years (10mins, Dir. by Connor Snedecor)	
La Lune Folle (10mins, Dir. by Meneka Das)	
Best Man (5mins, Dir. by Freddie Hall)	Best Supporting Actor (Ben Hall)
Him (4mins, Dir. by Tony Burke)	
Doctor for Mr. Chaplin (14mins, Dir. by Mike Booth)	British Lion Award
Tilted (3mins, Dir. by Lana MacIver)	
Sometimes It's Hard Being Sexy (5mins, Dir. by Blanche Anderson)	
The Boy by the Sea (7mins, Dir. by Vasily Chuprina)	
Juliet Remembered (19mins, Dir. by Tamzin Merchant)	Best Short Film
The Bus Stop (14mins, Dir. by Justin Malone)	
The Photographer (10mins, Dir. by Max Sobol)	Best Cinematography
Eat Local (94mins, Dir. by Jason Flemyng)	Best Director, Best Supporting Actress (Anette Crosbie)
Any Other Life (Unproduced screenplay by Josie Martineaux & Ri Versteegh)	Best Unproduced Screenplay
Drowning of the East River (Unproduced screenplay by Kimberly C. Pierce)	Best Unproduced Screenplay Special Commendation
Elephant & Castle (Unproduced screenplay by Samuel Bernstein)	Best Unproduced Screenplay Special Commendation
Simon (Unproduced screenplay by Liam Anderson)	Best Unproduced Screenplay Special Commendation
Three Steps to Heaven (Unproduced screenplay by Matt Pacini)	Best Unproduced Screenplay Special Commendation
Land That I Love (Unproduced screenplay by Jonathon LaPoma)	Best Unproduced Screenplay Special Commendation
A God Amongst Men (Unproduced screenplay by Vijay Varman)	Best Unproduced Screenplay Special Commendation
One More Saturday (Unproduced screenplay by Alex King)	Best Unproduced Screenplay Special Commendation
Bear Necessity (Unproduced screenplay by James Gould-Bourn)	Best Unproduced Screenplay Special Commendation

=== 2018 British Independent Film Festival Official Selection & Award Winners ===
2018 Film Nominees (22 Films)	Award Winners
Dead Tired (12mins, Dir. by Abbie Lucas)	
Dispersion (18mins, Dir. by Nikita Trocki)	
Cotton Wool (38mins, Dir. by Nicholas Connor)	Best Supporting Actor (Max Vento), Best Supporting Actress (Katie Quinn)
Buried (5mins, Dir. by Neil Webster)	
Sketch (12mins, Dir. by Peter Lee Scott)	Best Short Film
White Lies (7mins, Dir. by Harry Hitchens)	Best Actor (Bill Milner)
Retreat (82mins, Dir. by Tom Nicoll)	Best Music
Little Joe (17mins, Dir. by Ned Donohoe)	
On Call (9mins, Dir. by Lee Armstrong)	
Free Period (6mins, Dir. by Alison Piper)	
Happiness in Retrospect (25mins, Dir. by Eli Hart)	
The Fence (20mins, Dir. by William Stone)	British Lion Award
Songs of Wild Animals (12mins, Dir. by Mara Weber)	Best Director
Don't Burn the Breakfast (10mins, Dir. by Daisy Stenham)	
Gloves Off (96mins, Dir. by Steven Nesbit)	Best Feature Film
To Pluto (15mins, Dir. by Yen-Ju Lee)	Best Student Film
War Has No Eyes (14mins, Dir. by Perry White)	
Jewels (15mins, Dir. by Ottilie Wilford)	
Shemira (22mins, Dir. by Adam Wells)	
Icarus (26mins, Dir. by Nicolas Boucart)	Best Cinematography
Sunset Contract (93mins, Dir. by Marc Conen)	Best Actress (Paris Jefferson)
Polterheist (90mins, Dir. by David Gilbank)	
The Hippo in the Room (Unproduced Screenplay by Tom Bridger)	Best Unproduced Screenplay Joint Winner
Dave's New World (Unproduced Screenplay by Luke Dinsmore)	Best Unproduced Screenplay Joint Winner
Try Again (Unproduced Screenplay by Michael Rowney)	Best Unproduced Screenplay Special Commendation
Grandfathers (Unproduced Screenplay by Vacen Taylor)	Best Unproduced Screenplay Special Commendation
The Rental (Unproduced Screenplay by L. P. Lee)	Best Unproduced Screenplay Special Commendation
Spotless (Unproduced Screenplay by Kevin Powis)	Best Unproduced Screenplay Special Commendation
Go Out With Love (Unproduced Screenplay by Meredith Nunnikhoven)	Best Unproduced Screenplay Special Commendation

=== 2019 British Independent Film Festival Official Selection & Award Winners ===
2019 Film Nominees (23 Films)	Award Winners
Good Luck (11mins, Dir. by Franz Böhm)	Best Cinematography (Friedemann Leis)
Farside (17mins, Dir. by Ash Morris)	Best Supporting Actress (Sacha Parkinson)
Two People, One Ring (8mins, Dir. by Evan Richards)	
What Is Your Name (11mins, Dir. by Nathan Birdi)	
Bottle Boy (2mins, Dir. by Tony Burke)	Best Short Film
Little Hands (15mins, Dir. by Rémi Allier)	
An Affordable Devil (11mins, Dir. by Alexander Newman & Richard Newman)	
Kaliedoscope (11mins, Dir. by Nicole Pott)	
Ruptured (6mins, Dir. by James Mansell)	
Pictures of Lily (76mins, Dir. by Mark Banks)	Best Actor (Daniel Lane)
Deleted (20mins, Dir. by Stephan Pierre Mitchell)	
Miss (15mins, Dir. by Drew Pautz)	Best Supporting Actor (Paul Barber)
Beyond These Shores (13mins, Dir. by Yury Sharov)	British Lion Award
A Stitch in Time (13mins, Dir. by Graham Atkins-Huhghes)	
Hastings (12mins, Dir. by Ella Bishop)	
Jawjaw – Survive This (6mins, Dir. by Ian Roderick Gray)	Best Music Video
Dirty Little Rascals (11mins, Dir. by Ben Bovington-Key)	
Somebody's Daughter (10mins, Dir. by Shalini Adnani)	Best Student Film
Saltwater Sun – The Wire (4mins, Dir. by Laurie Barraclough)	
Convergence (97mins, Dir. by Steve Johnson)	Best Feature Film
The Conqueror (12mins, Dir. by Timothy Blackwood)	
Special Delivery (9mins, Dir. by Giulia Gandini)	
House Red (151mins, Dir. by Coz Greenop)	Best Director
Skull Hunter (Unproduced screenplay by Steven Murphy)	Best Unproduced Screenplay

=== 2020 British Independent Film Festival Official Selection & Award Winners ===
2020 Film Nominees (54 Films)	Award Winners
American Mirror: Intimations of Immortality (62mins, Dir. by Arthur Balder)	
Born to Be (93mins, Dir. by Tania Cypriano)	
Coup 53 (120mins, Dir. by Taghi Amirani)	
Into The Storm (84mins, Dir. by Adam Brown)	
Love Type D (95mins, Dir. by Sasha Collington)	
Philophobia (125mins, Dir. by Guy Davies)	
The Good Death (83mins, Dir. by Tomas Krupa)	
Vitamin Sea (68mins, Dir. by James Appleton)	
Vultures (113mins, Dir. by Claudio Borrelli)	Best Feature Film
Write When You Get Work (99mins, Dir. by Stacy Cochran)	Legend of Cinema Award (Emily Mortimer)
2050 (4mins, Dir. by Lupashko Alexandra)	
2 in a Million (4mins, Dir. by J. A. Moreno)	
2Pillz (3mins, Dir. by David Tomaszewski)	Best Music Video
Adams (20mins, Dir. by Tom Stern)	
Adolescence (15mins, Dir. by Zeb Daemen)	
After The Beep (3mins, Dir. by Florian Bison)	
Already Seen (4mins, Dir. by Rodrigo Fleury)	
ANNA (15mins, Dir. by Dekel Berenson)	
Another Place (4mins, Dir. by Anna Radchenko & Jeremy Schaulin-Rioux)	
Asphyxiate (14mins, Dir. by Nicole Pott)	
Audio of Apologies (4mins, Dir. by Yuri+Ana)	
Be Good (15mins, Dir. by James Lawes)	
Captain Beany (5mins, Dir. by Sophie Perrins)	
Clementines (18mins, Dir. by Laurie Barraclough)	Best Short Film
Crash Landing (6mins, Dir. by Maxwell Harris-Tharp & William Miller)	
Daughter (18mins, Dir. by Christian Kinde)	
Forget Me Not (21mins, Dir. by Nicholas Goulden)	
Freeze (15mins, Dir. by Maya Albanese)	
His Name was Gerry (12mins, Dir. by Peter Lee Scott)	Best Director
Innocence (20mins, Dir. by Ben Reid)	Best Actress (Bella Camero)
Kid Kapichi - Thugs (3mins, Dir. by James Green)	
Let's Roll (23mins, Dir. by Chris Thomas)	
Lockdown (5mins, Dir. by Paul London & Tracey Moberly)	
Lucky Break (11mins, Dir. by John Addis)	The Milsome Award for Cinematography (Frank Madone)
My Dad Marie (15mins, Dir. by Maj Jukic)	
OCD (5mins, Dir. by Lucas Bosch-Coubris)	
On My Own (17mins, Dir. by Kristian Young)	
Quiet Carriage (5mins, Dir. by Ben S. Hyland)	
Regulars (6mins, Dir. by Eli Hart)	Rising Star Award
Running After (13mins, Dir. by Will Peppercorn)	
Rush (10mins, Dir. by Adam Brashaw)	British Lion Award
Sadhbh (13mins, Dir. by Arjun Rose)	
Saudade (11mins, Dir. by Dan Boaden)	
Story About Viruses (1min, Dir. by Leon Karwowski, Roch Karwowski, Mia Karwowska & Tymon Karwowski)	
Sweet Street (15mins, Dir. by Coz Greenop)	
The Dark Night of the Soul (4mins, Dir. by Marnik Loysen)	
The Feathers (3mins, Dir. by Joe Bor)	
The Gentle Art of Violence (5mins, Dir. by Andrew Przybytkowski)	
The Hug Deal (3mins, Dir. by Charlie Dennis)	
The Lost Scot (15mins, Dir. by Julien Cornwall)	Best Student Film, Best Actor (James Corrigan)
This Time Away (14mins, Dir. by Magali Barbe)	
Too Young (5mins, Dir. by Colin Babcock & Amanda Smith)	
Winter Coat (11mins, Dir. by Werner Vivier)	
Yield (3mins, Dir. by Joel Stockman)	
Wax Puppy (Unproduced screenplay by Kyle Baugher)	Best Unproduced Screenplay
A Kind of Marriage (Unproduced screenplay by Charles Leipart)	Best Screenplay Runner-Up
Follow Up (Unproduced screenplay by Chris Watt)	Best Screenplay Runner-Up
Succession (Unproduced screenplay by Douglas Schofield)	Best Screenplay Runner-Up
Zombie Fish! (Unproduced screenplay by James Treloar)	Best Screenplay Runner-Up

=== 2021 British Independent Film Festival Official Selection & Award Winners ===
2021 Film Nominees (24 Films)	Award Winners
Clairevoyant (89mins, Dir. by Micaela Wittman)	
Fires in the Dark (94mins, Dir. by Dominique Lienhard)	The Milsome Award for Cinematography (Pascale Marin)
I Work at the Cemetery (100mins, Dir. by Oleksii Taranenko)	
Kol (The Lake) (100mins, Dir by Emil Atageldiev)	
To Nowhere (99mins, Dir. by Sian Astor-Lewis)	Best Feature Film, Best Supporting Actor (Orlando Seale)
Asynchronous (2mins, Dir. by Nicholas Afchain)	Best Music Video
Audrey (5mins, Dir. by Riyadh Haque)	
Beavers without Borders (16mins, Dir. by Nina Constable)	
Blindfold (12mins, Dir. by Adam Wawrety)	Best Supporting Actress (Madeleine MacMahon)
Clean (10mins, Dir. by Richard Paris Wilson)	British Lion Award
Enfer & Paradis (53mins, Dir. by Antoine Chicoye, Michael Darrigade & Alex Lesbats)	
If Everyone Knew (24mins, Dir. by Imogen Harrison)	
Livin' in the Light (4mins, Dir. by Hannah Hefner & Emmanuel Henreid)	
Rosa (19mins, Dir. by Jean-Michel Gervais & Gabriel J. Lemay)	
Shots of Light (4mins, Dir. by Christian Scharfenberg)	
Smokers Delight (12mins, Dir. by Jamie Whitby)	Best Actor (Jordan Stephens), Rising Star Award
Tanner Emmeret (3mins, Dir. by Helena Charlton-Jones)	
The Amazing World of Emma (10mins, Dir. by Laurence Roberts)	Best Student Film
The Fell Runner (4mins, Dir. by Alex Simpson & Phillip Suddick)	
The Gospel According to Gail (8mins, Dir. by Florence Winter Hill)	Best Director
The Opposite of Eternity (15mins, Dir. by Joshua Jádi)	
Trifle (15mins, Dir. by Mike Callaghan)	Best Short Film, Legend of Cinema Award (Amy Manson)
Violet (18mins, Dir. by David Hayes)	Best Actress (Gail Sixsmith)
What Is Ian (12mins, Dir. by Rob Price)	
Cheremere (Unproduced screenplay by Paolo Taddie)	
Face Painters (Unproduced screenplay by Giovanni Sanseviero)	
Modern Art (Unproduced screenplay by Laurence Fuller)	
Six Weeks of Summer (Unproduced screenplay by Serena Chloe Gardner)	
The Crystal Wall (Unproduced screenplay by Fernanda Alvarez)	Best Unproduced Screenplay

=== 2022 British Independent Film Festival Official Selection & Award Winners ===
2022 Film Nominees (33 Films)	Award Winners
Embers (20mins, Dir. by Tom Ganley)	
Lady Brently's End (6mins, Dir. by Sam Baron)	
The Flexed Arm Hang (6mins, Dir. by Findlay Brown)	
The Gossip (13mins, Dir. by Rolfin Nyhus)	Best Short Film
The War Behind the Door (10mins, Dir. by Tom Whitworth)	
Tinnitus (11mins, Dir. by Lucas Bosch-Coubris)	
Unseen (13mins, Dir. by Ian Robert Smith)	
Rudy (108mins, Dir. by Shona Auerbach)	Best Supporting Actor (Darren Day)
Big Ears (13mins, Dir. by Sam Baron)	Best Actor (Amit Shah)
Life Skills (5mins, Dir. by Gino Evans)	
One Man, Two Feet, Three Peaks (38mins, Dir. by Chris Baker)	Best Documentary
One Shot (14mins, Dir. by Robin Mason)	The Milsome Award for Cinematography
Undressed (10mins, Dir. by Elina Street)	
Medusa (86mins, Dir. by Sophie Levy)	
A Whispered Hope (5mins, Dir. Samantha Locock & Katie Loughrin)	
Áine Rose Daly - Places (4mins, Dir. by Jordan Cox)	
Gates (30mins, Dir. by Josh Pickup)	Best Actress (Iona Champion), British Lion Award
Mother Tongue (13mins, Dir. by Floris Ramaekers)	Best Director
One Last Spin (30mins, Dir. by Ross Donald)	
The Dealer (7mins, Dir. by Jamie Swaby & Kenton Thomas)	
Dennyiah - RECALL (6mins, Dir. by Erik Jasaň)	
Keep Off The Grass (10mins, Dir. by Francis Rudd)	
Made With Love (9mins, Dir. by Calum Macdiarmid)	
My Favourite Place (8mins, Dir. by Kristy Philipps)	Rising Star Award
Roy (15mins, Dir. by Tom Berkeley & Ross White)	
The Secret Life of Bees (5mins, Dir. by Mirabai Nicholson-McKellar)	
We Are Not Dead Yet (34mins, Dir. by Joanne Rakotoarisoa)	
An Irish Goodbye (23mins, Dir. by Tom Berkeley & Ross White)	
Harry The Hamster (7mins, Dir. by Lewis Reeves)	
Maya Yenn - How Much Sadness Can You Swallow? (3mins, Dir. by Maya Yenn)	Best Music Video
Nobody Listens Anymore (19mins, Dir. by Leo Bill)	
The Third Solar Term (20mins, Dir. by Zhanfei Song)	Best Student Film
The Last Heist (86mins, Dir. by Coz Greenop)	Best Feature Film, Best Supporting Actress (Emily Wyatt), Legend of Cinema Award (Terry Stone)
Going (Unproduced screenplay by Brad Brookes)	
Her Majesty (Unproduced screenplay by Keith Saltojanes)	
Paige Darcy and the Case of the Stoned Cat (Unproduced screenplay by Alice Moran)	
Pushing Daisy (Unproduced screenplay by Paul Quinn)	Best Unproduced Screenplay

=== 2023 British Independent Film Festival Official Selection & Award Winners ===
2023 Film Nominees (7 Films)	Award Winners
Short Stay, Long Stay (15mins, Dir. by Danny Carter)	
Hidden (15mins, Dir. by Paul Riordan)	The Milsome Award for Cinematography, British Lion Award
Maya Yenn - Better Luck Next Time (4mins, Dir. by Maya Yenn)	Best Music Video, Rising Star Award
Bitter Taste (18mins, Dir. by Ethan Tomás Race)	Best Short Film
Firm It (4mins, Dir. by Teni Gideon Ayankoya)	Best Student Film
Dyke Plumage (3mins, Dir. by Alexandra Gascón)	
Dreams Live in Trees (113mins, Dir. by Marco Della Fonte)	Best Feature Film, Best Director, Best Actor (Pietro Ragusa), Best Actress (Kiera Morgan), Best Supporting Actor (Fausto Maria Sciarappa), Best Supporting Actress (Evita Ciri)
Looking Over My Shoulder (Unproduced screenplay by John Ellis)	Best Unproduced Screenplay

== See also ==
- International Film Festival of Wales
- British Horror Film Festival
- British Animation Film Festival
