= Endless Scroll =

Studio album by Bodega
- Released: June 1, 2018
- Length: 33:17
- Label: What's Your Rupture?
- Producer: Austin Brown

Bodega chronology
Endless Scroll (2018)	Shiny New Model (2019)

Professional ratings
Aggregate scores
Source	Rating
Metacritic	74/100
Review scores
Source	Rating
AllMusic	4/5 stars
Blurt Magazine	4/5 stars
Clash	8/10
DIY	5/5 stars
Dork	4/5 stars
The Guardian	3/5 stars
The Guardian	4/5 stars
The Independent	4/5 stars
PopMatters	6/10

Endless Scroll is the debut studio album by American punk band Bodega. It was released on June 1, 2018 under What's Your Rupture?.

== Release ==
On April 3, 2018, Bodega announced the release of their debut album, along with the single "Can't Knock the Hustle". The next single "Jack In Titanic" was released on May 3, 2018.

== Critical reception ==
Endless Scroll was met with "generally favorable" reviews from critics. At Metacritic, which assigns a weighted average rating out of 100 to reviews from mainstream publications, this release received an average score of 74, based on 13 reviews. Aggregator Album of the Year gave the release a 75 out of 100 based on a critical consensus of 14 reviews.

In July of 2018, a rating of 6/10 was given by Kevin Korber citing its "monochromatic" experience as "the songs on Endless Scroll have a habit of blending into each other over time". Their lyrics were praised, however.

Many review sites place them around the 75/100 area (Metacritic - 74, AOTY - 75, New Noise Magazine - 4/5 Clash - 8/10, etc) and it has been mentioned that listening to them live or while they are on tour is a better experience than via audio device.

=== Accolades ===
Accolades for Endless Scroll
Publication	Accolade	Rank
Drift Records	Drift Records Top 100 Albums of 2018	4
Earbuddy	Earbuddy's Top 50 Albums of 2018	49
God Is in the TV	God Is in the TV's Top 100 Albums of 2018	10
Rough Trade	Rough Trade's Top 100 Albums of 2018	12

== Track listing ==
Endless Scroll track listing
No.	Title	Length
1.	"How Did This Happen?!"	3:00
2.	"Bodega Birth"	1:50
3.	"Name Escape"	3:40
4.	"Boxes for the Move"	2:48
5.	"I Am Not a Cinephile"	0:49
6.	"Can't Knock the Hustle"	1:43
7.	"Gyrate"	1:37
8.	"Jack in Titanic"	3:03
9.	"Margot"	1:34
10.	"Bookmarks"	2:25
11.	"Warhol"	1:30
12.	"Charlie"	2:32
13.	"Williamsburg Bridge"	3:57
14.	"Truth Is Not Punishment"	2:49
