= The Drummond Will =

- Poster
- Directed by: Alan Butterworth
- Written by: Alan Butterworth; Sam Forster
- Produced by: Tobias Tobbell
- Starring: Philip James; Mark Oosterveen
- Cinematography: Adam Etherington
- Edited by: Alex Emslie
- Music by: Charles Westropp
- Production company: KneeJerk
- Distributed by: Crabtree Films
- Release date: 5 August 2010 (Woods Hole)
- Running time: 81 minutes
- Country: United Kingdom
- Language: English

The Drummond Will is a 2011 British comedy film directed by Alan Butterworth, starring Philip James and Mark Oosterveen, and written by Butterworth and Sam Forster. The film is a fusion of the theatrical style found in classic Ealing Comedies with modern British humour.

== Plot ==
Following the death of their father, two sons inherit a decrepit cottage in a small British village in the middle of nowhere. They soon find the building also contains a large sum of unexpected cash, and through a combination of bad luck and very poor judgment they soon find themselves having to deal with an increasing body count of elderly villagers while attempting to avoid suspicion.

== Cast ==
- Philip James as Danny Drummond
- Mark Oosterveencas Marcus Drummond
- Jeremy Drakes as Solicitor
- Jonathan Hansler as Constable
- Victoria Jeffrey as Betty
- Nigel Osner as Vicar
- Eryl Lloyd Parry as Colonel
- Keith Parry as Rufus Drummond
- Morrison Thomas as Malcolm the Bastard

== Critical response ==
Critical reaction at film festivals was positive - it debuted at the Woods Hole Film Festival where it won the Best Film (Comedy) award, and later won various other festival awards including the Best International Feature award at the Big Island Film Festival. Dennis Harvey, reviewing the film for Variety, called it "an agreeable Ealing-meets-Farrelly feel on modest means" that will "amuse casual viewers and delight genre fans". George Haymont of the Huffington Post called it "one of the most refreshingly inventive and lovingly crafted send-ups of a beloved genre to be seen in many a moon" and is "the blackest of comedies and a joyful romp rolled into one very pleasing package".

== Home media ==
The film was released theatrically in the US in July 2011, with a DVD and Blu-ray release in August 2011 in the UK.
