= The Wants (band) =

American band

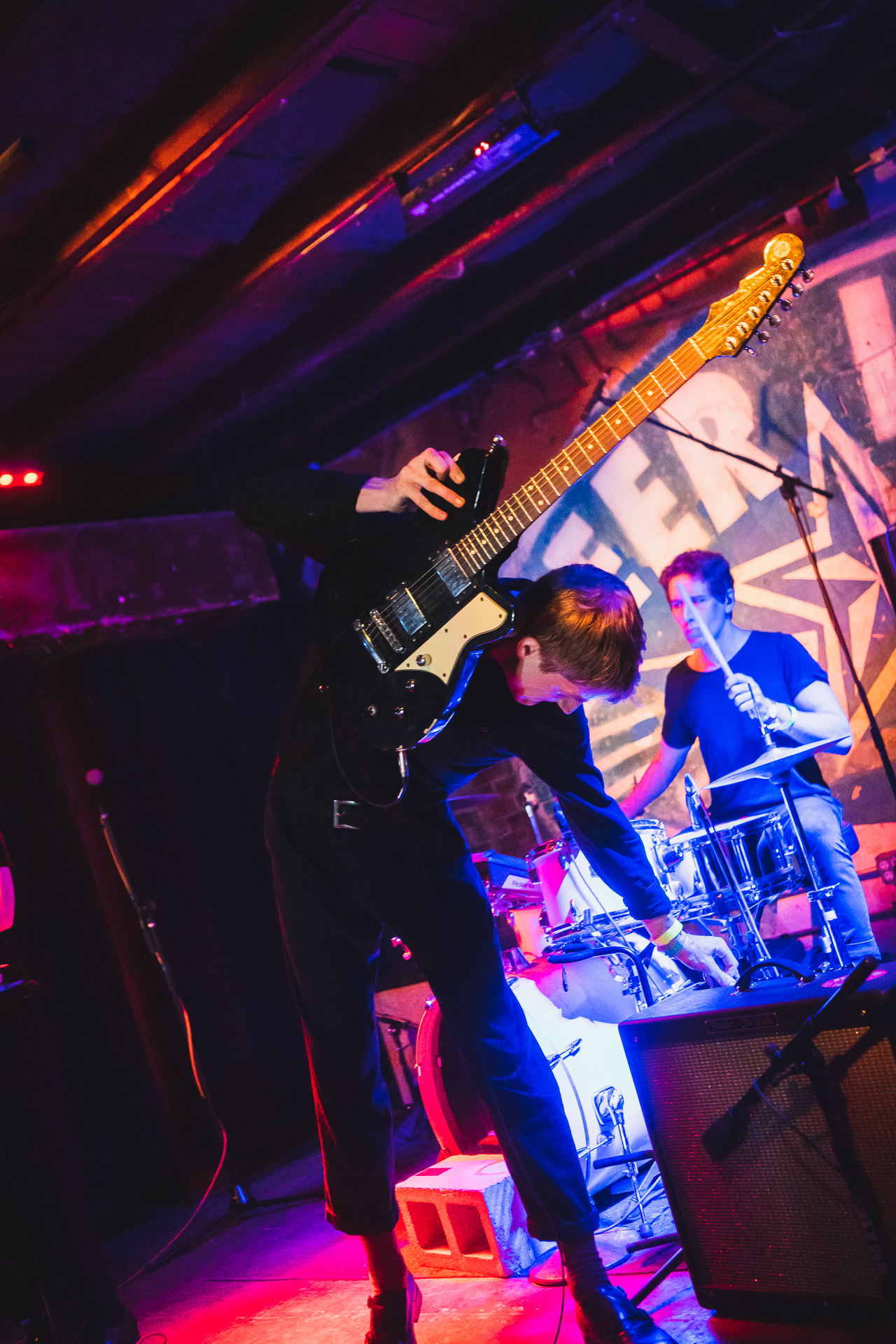
- The Wants performing at SXSW 2019

Background information
- Origin: New York City, United States
- Genres: No wave
- Years active: 2016–
- Label: Council Records
- Members: Madison Velding-VanDam; Jason Gates; Yasmin Haddad
- Past members: Heather Elle
- Website: https://thewantsnyc.bandcamp.com

The Wants are an American no wave band from New York City.

== History ==
Madison Velding-VanDam and Jason Gates first met in the Brooklyn music scene in 2014 and formed The Wants in 2016. In 2018 and 2019 they began recording and touring, including in 2019 performing at SXSW, ahead of their first studio album, Container, which came out on March 13, 2020.

Container was met with positive critical reviews.

== Musical style ==
In an interview with AdHoc Magazine, Velding-VanDam described their sound as a fusion of Detroit techno and New York City post-punk.

== Discography ==
=== Studio albums ===
- Container (2020)

=== Singles ===
- "Clearly A Crisis" (2019)
- "Fear My Society" (2019)
- "The Motor" (2020)
- "Container" (2020)
