= List of trails of Meagher County, Montana =

There are at least 36 named trails in Meagher County, Montana according to the U.S. Geological Survey, Board of Geographic Names. A trail is defined as: "Route for passage from one point to another; does not include roads or highways (jeep trail, path, ski trail)."

- Arkansas Traveller Ski Trail, 46°50′19″N 110°42′32″W, el. 7,621 feet (2,323 m)
- Big Seven Ski Trail, 46°50′19″N 110°42′32″W, el. 7,621 feet (2,323 m)
- Black Diamond Ski Trail, 46°50′19″N 110°42′32″W, el. 7,621 feet (2,323 m)
- Brown-eyed Queen Ski Trail, 46°50′19″N 110°42′32″W, el. 7,621 feet (2,323 m)
- Compromise Pass Ski Trail, 46°50′19″N 110°42′32″W, el. 7,621 feet (2,323 m)
- Cumberland Ski Trail, 46°50′19″N 110°42′32″W, el. 7,621 feet (2,323 m)
- Deep Creek Figure 8 Loop National Recreation Trail, 47°02′30″N 111°05′33″W, el. 5,794 feet (1,766 m)
- Dynamite Ski Trail, 46°50′19″N 110°42′32″W, el. 7,621 feet (2,323 m)
- Frisco Ski Trail, 46°50′19″N 110°42′32″W, el. 7,621 feet (2,323 m)
- Geronimo Ski Trail, 46°50′19″N 110°42′32″W, el. 7,621 feet (2,323 m)
- Glory Hole Ski Trail, 46°50′19″N 110°42′32″W, el. 7,621 feet (2,323 m)
- Golden Goose Ski Trail, 46°50′19″N 110°42′32″W, el. 7,621 feet (2,323 m)
- Good Luck Ski Trail, 46°50′19″N 110°42′32″W, el. 7,621 feet (2,323 m)
- Gun Barrel Ski Trail, 46°50′19″N 110°42′32″W, el. 7,621 feet (2,323 m)
- James Bond Ski Trail, 46°50′19″N 110°42′32″W, el. 7,621 feet (2,323 m)
- Jamison Trail, 46°39′51″N 110°38′15″W, el. 5,896 feet (1,797 m)
- Last Chance Gulch Ski Trail, 46°50′19″N 110°42′32″W, el. 7,621 feet (2,323 m)
- Mizpah Race Hill Ski Trail, 46°50′19″N 110°42′32″W, el. 7,621 feet (2,323 m)
- Mizpah Ski Trail, 46°50′19″N 110°42′32″W, el. 7,621 feet (2,323 m)
- Moly Ski Trail, 46°50′19″N 110°42′32″W, el. 7,621 feet (2,323 m)
- Muley Ski Trail, 46°50′19″N 110°42′32″W, el. 7,621 feet (2,323 m)
- Pan Handle Ski Trail, 46°50′19″N 110°42′32″W, el. 7,621 feet (2,323 m)
- Pay Dirt Ski Trail, 46°50′19″N 110°42′32″W, el. 7,621 feet (2,323 m)
- Prentice Ski Trail, 46°50′19″N 110°42′32″W, el. 7,621 feet (2,323 m)
- Quicksilver Lower Ski Trail, 46°50′19″N 110°42′32″W, el. 7,621 feet (2,323 m)
- Quicksilver Upper Ski Trail, 46°50′19″N 110°42′32″W, el. 7,621 feet (2,323 m)
- Ripley Lower Ski Trail, 46°50′19″N 110°42′32″W, el. 7,621 feet (2,323 m)
- Ripley Upper Ski Trail, 46°50′19″N 110°42′32″W, el. 7,621 feet (2,323 m)
- Ruby Gulch Ski Trail, 46°50′19″N 110°42′32″W, el. 7,621 feet (2,323 m)
- Ruby Ski Trail, 46°50′19″N 110°42′32″W, el. 7,621 feet (2,323 m)
- Second Thought Ski Trail, 46°50′19″N 110°42′32″W, el. 7,621 feet (2,323 m)
- Silverhorn Ski Trail, 46°50′19″N 110°42′32″W, el. 7,621 feet (2,323 m)
- Sluice Box Ski Trail, 46°50′19″N 110°42′32″W, el. 7,621 feet (2,323 m)
- Sour Dough Hill Ski Trail, 46°50′19″N 110°42′32″W, el. 7,621 feet (2,323 m)
- Speculation Ski Trail, 46°50′19″N 110°42′32″W, el. 7,621 feet (2,323 m)
- Yogo Ski Trail, 46°50′19″N 110°42′32″W, el. 7,621 feet (2,323 m)

== See also ==
- List of trails of Montana
- Trails of Yellowstone National Park
