= List of trails of Lewis and Clark County, Montana =

There are at least 121 named trails in Lewis and Clark County, Montana according to the U.S. Geological Survey, Board of Geographic Names. A trail is defined as: "Route for passage from one point to another; does not include roads or highways (jeep trail, path, ski trail)."

- 1906 Trail, el. 4,721 feet (1,439 m)
- Ahorn Creek Trail, el. 6,922 feet (2,110 m)
- Arrastra Creek Trail, el. 6,033 feet (1,839 m)
- Aztec Ski Trail, el. 5,955 feet (1,815 m)
- Backside Trail, el. 4,721 feet (1,439 m)
- Backyard Ski Trail, el. 5,955 feet (1,815 m)
- Bear Gulch Trail, el. 6,765 feet (2,062 m)
- Belmont Bowl Ski Trail, el. 5,955 feet (1,815 m)
- Between the Peaks Ski Trail, el. 5,955 feet (1,815 m)
- Blacktail Creek Trail, el. 6,437 feet (1,962 m)
- Bonanza Ski Trail, el. 5,955 feet (1,815 m)
- Broadway Ski Trail, el. 5,955 feet (1,815 m)
- Broncho Ski Trail, el. 5,955 feet (1,815 m)
- Bull Chute Ski Trail, el. 5,955 feet (1,815 m)
- Cabin Creek Dobrota Trail, el. 5,994 feet (1,827 m)
- Caribou Trail, el. 7,480 feet (2,280 m)
- Catamount Ski Trail, el. 5,955 feet (1,815 m)
- Chinese Wall Trail, el. 5,663 feet (1,726 m)
- Cigarette Creek Trail, el. 7,323 feet (2,232 m)
- Cold Turkey Cut-Off Ski Trail, el. 5,955 feet (1,815 m)
- Cooney Creek Trail, el. 7,480 feet (2,280 m)
- Corkscrew Ski Trail, el. 5,955 feet (1,815 m)
- Cougar Ski Trail, el. 5,955 feet (1,815 m)
- Crosscut Ski Trail, el. 5,955 feet (1,815 m)
- Crown Mountain Trail, el. 6,033 feet (1,839 m)
- Cruse Ski Trail, el. 5,955 feet (1,815 m)
- Cub Ski Trail, el. 5,955 feet (1,815 m)
- Dago Face Ski Trail, el. 5,955 feet (1,815 m)
- Dark Forest Ski Trail, el. 5,955 feet (1,815 m)
- Deadman Ski Trail, el. 5,955 feet (1,815 m)
- Dry Fork Cabin Creek Trail, el. 6,237 feet (1,901 m)
- Dry Gulch Ski Trail, el. 5,955 feet (1,815 m)
- Earthquake Ski Trail, el. 5,955 feet (1,815 m)
- Eclipse Ski Trail, el. 5,955 feet (1,815 m)
- Elbow Pass Trail, el. 6,604 feet (2,013 m)
- Eldorado Ski Trail, el. 5,955 feet (1,815 m)
- Elk Pass Trail, el. 6,601 feet (2,012 m)
- Fairview Trail, el. 6,197 feet (1,889 m)
- Flesher Pass Trail, el. 6,634 feet (2,022 m)
- Ford Willow Creek Trail, el. 5,794 feet (1,766 m)
- Fountain Head Ski Trail, el. 5,955 feet (1,815 m)
- Fourth of July Ski Trail, el. 5,955 feet (1,815 m)
- Good Luck Ski Trail, el. 5,955 feet (1,815 m)
- Gould Helmville Trail, el. 7,264 feet (2,214 m)
- Halfmoon Dearborn River Trail, el. 7,218 feet (2,200 m)
- Hals Ski Trail, el. 5,955 feet (1,815 m)
- Hanging Valley National Recreation Trail, el. 6,801 feet (2,073 m)
- Hardluck Ski Trail, el. 5,955 feet (1,815 m)
- Headwall Ski Trail, el. 5,955 feet (1,815 m)
- Hiballer Ski Trail, el. 5,955 feet (1,815 m)
- Hibernation Ski Trail, el. 5,955 feet (1,815 m)
- Hi-Voltage Ski Trail, el. 5,955 feet (1,815 m)
- Hogback Trail, el. 4,721 feet (1,439 m)
- Huckleberry Hill Ski Trail, el. 5,955 feet (1,815 m)
- Huggins Flat Ski Trail, el. 5,955 feet (1,815 m)
- Jackpot Ski Trail, el. 5,955 feet (1,815 m)
- Jakie Creek Trail, el. 5,886 feet (1,794 m)
- Kinnickinnick Ski Trail, el. 5,955 feet (1,815 m)
- Landers Fork Trail, el. 5,994 feet (1,827 m)
- Last Hope Ski Trail, el. 5,955 feet (1,815 m)
- Littles Ski Trail, el. 5,955 feet (1,815 m)
- Liverpool Snowbank Trail, el. 6,985 feet (2,129 m)
- Lone Mountain Trail, el. 6,076 feet (1,852 m)
- Lost Cabin Cave Creek Trail, el. 7,579 feet (2,310 m)
- Lower Broncho Ski Trail, el. 5,955 feet (1,815 m)
- Lower Wild Acres Ski Trail, el. 5,955 feet (1,815 m)
- Main Line Trail, el. 6,063 feet (1,848 m)
- Meadow Creek Trail, el. 5,882 feet (1,793 m)
- Middle Zee Ski Trail, el. 5,955 feet (1,815 m)
- Miners Basin Ski Trail, el. 5,955 feet (1,815 m)
- Mount Helena National Recreation Trail, el. 5,256 feet (1,602 m)
- North Access Trail, el. 4,721 feet (1,439 m)
- North Fork Trail, el. 5,433 feet (1,656 m)
- North Forty Ski Trail, el. 5,955 feet (1,815 m)
- North Woods Ski Trail, el. 5,955 feet (1,815 m)
- Patrol Mountain Lookout Trail, el. 5,535 feet (1,687 m)
- Petty Crown Creek Trail, el. 6,949 feet (2,118 m)
- Petty Ford Creek Trail, el. 5,718 feet (1,743 m)
- Piskun Ridge Ski Trail, el. 5,955 feet (1,815 m)
- Pit Parks Ski Trail, el. 5,955 feet (1,815 m)
- Pluto Ski Trail, el. 5,955 feet (1,815 m)
- Powderbound Ski Trail, el. 5,955 feet (1,815 m)
- Power Drive Ski Trail, el. 5,955 feet (1,815 m)
- Prairie Trail, el. 4,721 feet (1,439 m)
- Prospect Shafts Trail, el. 4,721 feet (1,439 m)
- Puma Ski Trail, el. 5,955 feet (1,815 m)
- Rabbit Ski Trail, el. 5,955 feet (1,815 m)
- Rawhide Ridge Ski Trail, el. 5,955 feet (1,815 m)
- Rawhide Road Ski Trail, el. 5,955 feet (1,815 m)
- Red Mountain Trail, el. 7,841 feet (2,390 m)
- Red Tail Trail Ski Trail, el. 5,955 feet (1,815 m)
- Ridge Run Ski Trail, el. 5,955 feet (1,815 m)
- Rock Creek Trail, el. 6,329 feet (1,929 m)
- Rogue Ski Trail, el. 5,955 feet (1,815 m)
- Scout Ski Trail, el. 5,955 feet (1,815 m)
- Shady Lane Ski Trail, el. 5,955 feet (1,815 m)
- Shanty Ski Trail, el. 5,955 feet (1,815 m)
- Silver King Trail, el. 6,096 feet (1,858 m)
- Skyline Ski Trail, el. 5,955 feet (1,815 m)
- Smith Creek Trail, el. 5,613 feet (1,711 m)
- Snagletooth Ski Trail, el. 5,955 feet (1,815 m)
- Snow Fields Ski Trail, el. 5,955 feet (1,815 m)
- Snowshoe Ski Trail, el. 5,955 feet (1,815 m)
- Spread Mountain Trail, el. 6,824 feet (2,080 m)
- Steamboat Lookout Pass, el. 7,526 feet (2,294 m)
- Sunshine Bowl Ski Trail, el. 5,955 feet (1,815 m)
- Sweeney Creek Ecology Trail, el. 5,082 feet (1,549 m)
- The Big Open Ski Trail, el. 5,955 feet (1,815 m)
- The Drifts Ski Trail, el. 5,955 feet (1,815 m)
- The Hollow Ski Trail, el. 5,955 feet (1,815 m)
- The Meadow Ski Trail, el. 5,955 feet (1,815 m)
- Three Acre Wood Ski Trail, el. 5,955 feet (1,815 m)
- Upper Landers Trail, el. 6,339 feet (1,932 m)
- Upper Wild Acres Ski Trail, el. 5,955 feet (1,815 m)
- Upper Zee Ski Trail, el. 5,955 feet (1,815 m)
- Vigilante National Recreation Trail, el. 5,512 feet (1,680 m)
- Waterfall Ski Trail, el. 5,955 feet (1,815 m)
- Weasel Creek Trail, el. 6,427 feet (1,959 m)
- West Falls Trail, el. 6,112 feet (1,863 m)
- Whitetail Creek Trail, el. 6,355 feet (1,937 m)
- Wildside Ski Trail, el. 5,955 feet (1,815 m)

== See also ==
- List of trails of Montana
- Trails of Yellowstone National Park

== Notes ==
46°35′23″N 112°03′31″W 47°29′29″N 113°05′40″W 47°06′35″N 112°47′35″W 46°45′12″N 112°18′50″W 46°35′23″N 112°03′31″W 46°45′12″N 112°18′50″W 46°31′04″N 112°17′52″W 46°45′12″N 112°18′50″W 46°45′12″N 112°18′50″W 47°14′32″N 112°38′19″W 46°45′12″N 112°18′50″W 46°45′12″N 112°18′50″W 46°45′12″N 112°18′50″W 46°45′12″N 112°18′50″W 47°16′51″N 112°54′00″W 47°10′23″N 112°32′06″W 46°45′12″N 112°18′50″W 47°36′51″N 113°04′11″W 47°22′19″N 112°50′36″W 46°45′12″N 112°18′50″W 47°14′13″N 112°45′28″W 46°45′12″N 112°18′50″W 46°45′12″N 112°18′50″W 46°45′12″N 112°18′50″W 47°23′29″N 112°44′36″W 46°45′12″N 112°18′50″W 46°45′12″N 112°18′50″W 46°45′12″N 112°18′50″W 46°45′12″N 112°18′50″W 46°45′12″N 112°18′50″W 47°19′15″N 112°56′49″W 46°45′12″N 112°18′50″W 46°45′12″N 112°18′50″W 46°45′12″N 112°18′50″W 47°24′08″N 112°52′04″W 46°45′12″N 112°18′50″W 47°18′47″N 112°40′53″W 47°29′41″N 112°47′36″W 46°57′09″N 112°25′58″W 47°26′32″N 112°42′06″W 46°45′12″N 112°18′50″W 46°45′12″N 112°18′50″W 46°45′12″N 112°18′50″W 46°50′34″N 112°35′02″W 47°18′51″N 112°48′41″W 46°45′12″N 112°18′50″W 46°46′54″N 111°37′13″W 46°45′12″N 112°18′50″W 46°45′12″N 112°18′50″W 46°45′12″N 112°18′50″W 46°45′12″N 112°18′50″W 46°45′12″N 112°18′50″W 46°35′23″N 112°03′31″W 46°45′12″N 112°18′50″W 46°45′12″N 112°18′50″W 46°45′12″N 112°18′50″W 47°21′15″N 112°42′31″W 46°45′12″N 112°18′50″W 47°09′32″N 112°38′59″W 46°45′12″N 112°18′50″W 46°45′12″N 112°18′50″W 47°02′30″N 112°39′28″W 47°06′28″N 112°36′24″W 47°17′56″N 112°46′30″W 46°45′12″N 112°18′50″W 46°45′12″N 112°18′50″W 47°09′10″N 112°43′25″W 47°09′24″N 112°46′48″W 46°45′12″N 112°18′50″W 46°45′12″N 112°18′50″W 46°34′10″N 112°06′19″W 46°35′23″N 112°03′31″W 47°11′46″N 112°54′13″W 46°45′12″N 112°18′50″W 46°45′12″N 112°18′50″W 47°27′29″N 112°52′14″W 47°22′31″N 112°46′44″W 47°23′56″N 112°42′42″W 46°45′12″N 112°18′50″W 46°45′12″N 112°18′50″W 46°45′12″N 112°18′50″W 46°45′12″N 112°18′50″W 46°45′12″N 112°18′50″W 46°35′23″N 112°03′31″W 46°35′23″N 112°03′31″W 46°45′12″N 112°18′50″W 46°45′12″N 112°18′50″W 46°45′12″N 112°18′50″W 46°45′12″N 112°18′50″W 47°07′35″N 112°42′30″W 46°45′12″N 112°18′50″W 46°45′12″N 112°18′50″W 47°43′55″N 113°06′35″W 46°45′12″N 112°18′50″W 46°45′12″N 112°18′50″W 46°45′12″N 112°18′50″W 46°45′12″N 112°18′50″W 47°05′52″N 112°33′00″W 46°45′12″N 112°18′50″W 47°20′40″N 112°40′14″W 46°45′12″N 112°18′50″W 46°45′12″N 112°18′50″W 46°45′12″N 112°18′50″W 47°11′28″N 113°03′25″W 47°18′41″N 112°39′43″W 46°45′12″N 112°18′50″W 46°35′51″N 112°14′52″W 46°45′12″N 112°18′50″W 46°45′12″N 112°18′50″W 46°45′12″N 112°18′50″W 46°45′12″N 112°18′50″W 46°45′12″N 112°18′50″W 47°11′36″N 112°42′26″W 46°45′12″N 112°18′50″W 46°45′12″N 112°18′50″W 46°45′51″N 111°37′14″W 46°45′12″N 112°18′50″W 47°19′32″N 112°41′25″W 47°12′04″N 112°32′48″W 47°15′52″N 112°41′23″W 46°45′12″N 112°18′50″W
