= List of trails of Carbon County, Montana =

There are at least 75 named trails in Carbon County, Montana according to the U.S. Geological Survey, Board of Geographic Names. A trail is defined as: "Route for passage from one point to another; does not include roads or highways (jeep trail, path, ski trail)."

- Auto Bahn Ski Trail, 45°11′15″N 109°21′03″W, el. 8,294 feet (2,528 m)
- Barriers Ski Trail, 45°11′15″N 109°21′03″W, el. 8,294 feet (2,528 m)
- Bear Paw Ski Trail, 45°11′15″N 109°21′03″W, el. 8,294 feet (2,528 m)
- Bent Trail, 45°10′17″N 108°35′35″W, el. 7,493 feet (2,284 m)
- Berrys Ski Trail, 45°11′15″N 109°21′03″W, el. 8,294 feet (2,528 m)
- Big Bear Gulch Ski Trail, 45°11′15″N 109°21′03″W, el. 8,294 feet (2,528 m)
- Big Silver Ski Trail, 45°11′15″N 109°21′03″W, el. 8,294 feet (2,528 m)
- Bigfoot Ski Trail, 45°11′15″N 109°21′03″W, el. 8,294 feet (2,528 m)
- Black Powder Ski Trail, 45°11′15″N 109°21′03″W, el. 8,294 feet (2,528 m)
- Bobcat Ski Trail, 45°11′15″N 109°21′03″W, el. 8,294 feet (2,528 m)
- Boomerang Ski Trail, 45°11′15″N 109°21′03″W, el. 8,294 feet (2,528 m)
- Buckin Chute Ski Trail, 45°11′15″N 109°21′03″W, el. 8,294 feet (2,528 m)
- Burnt Ridge Trail, 45°06′11″N 108°31′52″W, el. 6,178 feet (1,883 m)
- Cariboo Ski Trail, 45°11′15″N 109°21′03″W, el. 8,294 feet (2,528 m)
- Chicken Ski Trail, 45°11′15″N 109°21′03″W, el. 8,294 feet (2,528 m)
- Coal Chute Ski Trail, 45°11′15″N 109°21′03″W, el. 8,294 feet (2,528 m)
- Columbine Ski Trail, 45°11′15″N 109°21′03″W, el. 8,294 feet (2,528 m)
- Custer National Forest Trail, 45°02′24″N 109°19′59″W, el. 9,609 feet (2,929 m)
- Drainage Ski Trail, 45°11′15″N 109°21′03″W, el. 8,294 feet (2,528 m)
- Drifter Ski Trail, 45°11′15″N 109°21′03″W, el. 8,294 feet (2,528 m)
- East Parks Ski Trail, 45°11′15″N 109°21′03″W, el. 8,294 feet (2,528 m)
- East Side Mine Ski Trail, 45°11′15″N 109°21′03″W, el. 8,294 feet (2,528 m)
- Easy Street Ski Trail, 45°11′15″N 109°21′03″W, el. 8,294 feet (2,528 m)
- Face of M Ski Trail, 45°11′15″N 109°21′03″W, el. 8,294 feet (2,528 m)
- First Street Ski Trail, 45°11′15″N 109°21′03″W, el. 8,294 feet (2,528 m)
- Flintlock Ski Trail, 45°11′15″N 109°21′03″W, el. 8,294 feet (2,528 m)
- Graham Trail, 45°06′39″N 108°33′46″W, el. 5,820 feet (1,770 m)
- Hancock Ski Trail, 45°11′15″N 109°21′03″W, el. 8,294 feet (2,528 m)
- Headwaters Ski Trail, 45°11′15″N 109°21′03″W, el. 8,294 feet (2,528 m)
- Hellroaring Ski Trail, 45°11′15″N 109°21′03″W, el. 8,294 feet (2,528 m)
- Intimidation Ski Trail, 45°11′15″N 109°21′03″W, el. 8,294 feet (2,528 m)
- Jones Park Ski Trail, 45°11′15″N 109°21′03″W, el. 8,294 feet (2,528 m)
- King Trail, 45°08′42″N 108°35′29″W, el. 6,414 feet (1,955 m)
- Latigo Ski Trail, 45°11′15″N 109°21′03″W, el. 8,294 feet (2,528 m)
- Lazy M Ski Trail, 45°11′15″N 109°21′03″W, el. 8,294 feet (2,528 m)
- Little Forest Ski Trail, 45°11′15″N 109°21′03″W, el. 8,294 feet (2,528 m)
- Little Silver Ski Trail, 45°11′15″N 109°21′03″W, el. 8,294 feet (2,528 m)
- Little Tree Ski Trail, 45°11′15″N 109°21′03″W, el. 8,294 feet (2,528 m)
- Lobo Ski Trail, 45°11′15″N 109°21′03″W, el. 8,294 feet (2,528 m)
- Lodge Pole Ski Trail, 45°11′15″N 109°21′03″W, el. 8,294 feet (2,528 m)
- Lodge Ski Trail, 45°11′15″N 109°21′03″W, el. 8,294 feet (2,528 m)
- Lower Barriers Ski Trail, 45°11′15″N 109°21′03″W, el. 8,294 feet (2,528 m)
- Lower Continental Ski Trail, 45°11′15″N 109°21′03″W, el. 8,294 feet (2,528 m)
- Lower Limited Ski Trail, 45°11′15″N 109°21′03″W, el. 8,294 feet (2,528 m)
- Lower Miami Beach Ski Trail, 45°11′15″N 109°21′03″W, el. 8,294 feet (2,528 m)
- Lower Royals Ski Trail, 45°11′15″N 109°21′03″W, el. 8,294 feet (2,528 m)
- Lynns Run Ski Trail, 45°11′15″N 109°21′03″W, el. 8,294 feet (2,528 m)
- Meeteetse Ski Trail, 45°11′15″N 109°21′03″W, el. 8,294 feet (2,528 m)
- Miami Beach Ski Trail, 45°11′15″N 109°21′03″W, el. 8,294 feet (2,528 m)
- Midway Express Access Ski Trail, 45°11′15″N 109°21′03″W, el. 8,294 feet (2,528 m)
- Miller Trail, 45°11′25″N 108°38′21″W, el. 6,276 feet (1,913 m)
- North Forty Ski Trail, 45°11′15″N 109°21′03″W, el. 8,294 feet (2,528 m)
- Paradise Ski Trail, 45°11′15″N 109°21′03″W, el. 8,294 feet (2,528 m)
- Penwells Ski Trail, 45°11′15″N 109°21′03″W, el. 8,294 feet (2,528 m)
- Pine Ridge Ski Trail, 45°11′15″N 109°21′03″W, el. 8,294 feet (2,528 m)
- Piney Creek Trail, 45°07′10″N 108°34′36″W, el. 5,784 feet (1,763 m)
- Second Street Ski Trail, 45°11′15″N 109°21′03″W, el. 8,294 feet (2,528 m)
- Show Off Alley Ski Trail, 45°11′15″N 109°21′03″W, el. 8,294 feet (2,528 m)
- Sidesaddle Ski Trail, 45°11′15″N 109°21′03″W, el. 8,294 feet (2,528 m)
- Silver Ski Trail, 45°11′15″N 109°21′03″W, el. 8,294 feet (2,528 m)
- Sluice Box Ski Trail, 45°11′15″N 109°21′03″W, el. 8,294 feet (2,528 m)
- Stockman Trail, 45°07′19″N 108°32′51″W, el. 6,627 feet (2,020 m)
- The Kitchen Ski Trail, 45°11′15″N 109°21′03″W, el. 8,294 feet (2,528 m)
- The Ridge Ski Trail, 45°11′15″N 109°21′03″W, el. 8,294 feet (2,528 m)
- Third Street Ski Trail, 45°11′15″N 109°21′03″W, el. 8,294 feet (2,528 m)
- Thompsons Ski Trail, 45°11′15″N 109°21′03″W, el. 8,294 feet (2,528 m)
- Tipi Ski Trail, 45°11′15″N 109°21′03″W, el. 8,294 feet (2,528 m)
- True Grit Ski Trail, 45°11′15″N 109°21′03″W, el. 8,294 feet (2,528 m)
- Turnpike Ski Trail, 45°11′15″N 109°21′03″W, el. 8,294 feet (2,528 m)
- Upper Continental Ski Trail, 45°11′15″N 109°21′03″W, el. 8,294 feet (2,528 m)
- Upper Limited Ski Trail, 45°11′15″N 109°21′03″W, el. 8,294 feet (2,528 m)
- West Parks Ski Trail, 45°11′15″N 109°21′03″W, el. 8,294 feet (2,528 m)
- West Side Mine Ski Trail, 45°11′15″N 109°21′03″W, el. 8,294 feet (2,528 m)
- Widow Maker Ski Trail, 45°11′15″N 109°21′03″W, el. 8,294 feet (2,528 m)
- Winchester Ski Trail, 45°11′15″N 109°21′03″W, el. 8,294 feet (2,528 m)

== See also ==
- List of trails of Montana
- Trails of Yellowstone National Park
