= List of trails of Powell County, Montana =

There are at least 29 named trails in Powell County, Montana according to the U.S. Geological Survey, Board of Geographic Names. A trail is defined as: "Route for passage from one point to another; does not include roads or highways (jeep trail, path, ski trail)."

- Blackfoot Divide Trail, 47°15′24″N 113°21′48″W, el. 7,290 feet (2,220 m)
- Camp Creek Pass Trail, 47°28′04″N 113°06′23″W, el. 6,227 feet (1,898 m)
- Catchem Creek Trail, 47°28′25″N 113°11′37″W, el. 4,734 feet (1,443 m)
- Center Creek Trail, 47°15′14″N 113°11′23″W, el. 6,339 feet (1,932 m)
- Center Ridge Trail, 47°11′36″N 113°11′02″W, el. 6,237 feet (1,901 m)
- Conger Creek Trail, 47°12′53″N 113°04′45″W, el. 6,614 feet (2,016 m)
- Conger Point Trail, 47°12′41″N 113°05′45″W, el. 7,743 feet (2,360 m)
- Danaher Hahn Creek Trail, 47°21′13″N 113°04′45″W, el. 5,958 feet (1,816 m)
- Dunham Lodgepole Trail, 47°09′48″N 113°11′33″W, el. 4,390 feet (1,340 m)
- Dunham Trail, 47°11′25″N 113°15′26″W, el. 5,394 feet (1,644 m)
- Dwight Creek Trail, 47°14′03″N 113°05′53″W, el. 7,880 feet (2,400 m)
- Falls Canyon Trail, 47°11′23″N 113°04′03″W, el. 6,588 feet (2,008 m)
- Fenn Mountain Trail, 47°11′55″N 113°06′54″W, el. 7,631 feet (2,326 m)
- Foolhen Creek Trail, 47°21′45″N 113°07′41″W, el. 5,620 feet (1,710 m)
- Foolhen Mountain Trail, 47°20′06″N 113°03′39″W, el. 5,610 feet (1,710 m)
- Haystack Mountain Trail, 47°35′11″N 113°09′32″W, el. 6,565 feet (2,001 m)
- Holland Gordon Trail, 47°25′46″N 113°26′43″W, el. 5,407 feet (1,648 m)
- Jumbo Lookout Trail, 47°24′38″N 113°08′14″W, el. 6,099 feet (1,859 m)
- Lake Otatsy Trail, 47°09′47″N 113°01′53″W, el. 6,201 feet (1,890 m)
- Limestone Pass Trail, 47°15′37″N 113°08′03″W, el. 6,657 feet (2,029 m)
- Lodgepole Trail, 47°13′25″N 113°11′48″W, el. 5,338 feet (1,627 m)
- McCabe Lake Creek Trail, 47°08′39″N 113°02′32″W, el. 5,853 feet (1,784 m)
- McDermott Trail, 47°08′31″N 112°56′32″W, el. 4,902 feet (1,494 m)
- Meadow Creek Trail, 47°04′51″N 112°50′18″W, el. 6,489 feet (1,978 m)
- Mineral Creek Trail, 47°07′17″N 112°54′41″W, el. 6,598 feet (2,011 m)
- Monture Haun Trail, 47°11′39″N 113°09′20″W, el. 4,754 feet (1,449 m)
- Monture Trail, 47°16′24″N 113°10′59″W, el. 5,574 feet (1,699 m)
- Morrell Falls National Recreation Trail, 47°17′07″N 113°27′44″W, el. 4,793 feet (1,461 m)
- Pyramid Pass Trail, 47°15′28″N 113°24′25″W, el. 5,951 feet (1,814 m)

== See also ==
- List of trails of Montana
- Trails of Yellowstone National Park
