= List of trails of Park County, Montana =

There are at least 22 named trails in Park County, Montana according to the U.S. Geological Survey, Board of Geographic Names. A trail is defined as: "Route for passage from one point to another; does not include roads or highways (jeep trail, path, ski trail)."

- Ash Mountain Trail, 45°05′33″N 110°31′01″W, el. 9,472 feet (2,887 m)
- Beaver Lakes Loop Trail, 44°59′48″N 110°42′44″W, el. 6,532 feet (1,991 m)
- Beaver Lakes Loop Trail, 44°59′12″N 110°42′12″W, el. 6,388 feet (1,947 m)
- Buffalo Plateau Trail, 44°59′49″N 110°24′26″W, el. 7,405 feet (2,257 m)
- Buffalo Plateau Trail, 44°59′43″N 110°17′27″W, el. 7,654 feet (2,333 m)
- Coyote Creek Trail, 45°01′38″N 110°24′14″W, el. 7,451 feet (2,271 m)
- Coyote Creek Trail, 44°59′03″N 110°25′31″W, el. 6,440 feet (1,960 m)
- Fawn Pass Trail, 44°55′45″N 110°55′07″W, el. 9,009 feet (2,746 m)
- Highland Trail, 45°18′11″N 110°31′31″W, el. 7,192 feet (2,192 m)
- Jardine-Hellroaring Trail, 45°04′37″N 110°31′43″W, el. 8,980 feet (2,740 m)
- Lower Blacktail Trail, 44°59′37″N 110°34′44″W, el. 5,961 feet (1,817 m)
- Poacher Trail, 45°02′21″N 110°20′45″W, el. 9,354 feet (2,851 m)
- Pole Gulch Trail, 45°22′42″N 110°49′43″W, el. 6,424 feet (1,958 m)
- Pole Gulch Trail, 45°21′23″N 110°53′53″W, el. 7,228 feet (2,203 m)
- Pyramid Trail, 45°16′54″N 110°29′35″W, el. 7,369 feet (2,246 m)
- Republic Trail, 44°59′35″N 109°56′23″W, el. 8,291 feet (2,527 m)
- Rescue Creek Trail, 45°00′54″N 110°38′48″W, el. 6,243 feet (1,903 m)
- Sidehill Trail, 45°18′03″N 110°29′13″W, el. 7,851 feet (2,393 m)
- Snowbank Trail, 45°12′54″N 110°34′05″W, el. 6,909 feet (2,106 m)
- Sportsman Lake Trail, 45°01′03″N 110°57′23″W, el. 8,005 feet (2,440 m)
- Wallace Creek Trail, 45°15′05″N 110°29′59″W, el. 6,289 feet (1,917 m)
- Yellowstone River Trail, 44°59′17″N 110°28′30″W, el. 6,286 feet (1,916 m)

== See also ==
- List of trails of Montana
- Trails of Yellowstone National Park
