= List of trails of Missoula County, Montana =

There are at least 54 named trails in Missoula County, Montana according to the U.S. Geological Survey, Board of Geographic Names. A trail is defined as: "Route for passage from one point to another; does not include roads or highways (jeep trail, path, ski trail)."

- Angle Face Ski Trail, 47°01′25″N 113°59′50″W, el. 5,938 feet (1,810 m)
- Big Sky Ski Trail, 47°01′25″N 113°59′50″W, el. 5,938 feet (1,810 m)
- Blue Mountain Equestrian and Hiking Trail, 46°50′06″N 114°06′23″W, el. 3,218 feet (981 m)
- Blue Mountain Nature Trail National Recreation Trail, 46°50′26″N 114°06′43″W, el. 3,379 feet (1,030 m)
- Bowl Outrun Ski Trail, 47°01′25″N 113°59′50″W, el. 5,938 feet (1,810 m)
- Carlton Lake Trail, 46°41′18″N 114°11′09″W, el. 8,163 feet (2,488 m)
- Centennial Trail Ski Trail, 47°01′25″N 113°59′50″W, el. 5,938 feet (1,810 m)
- Chicken Chute Ski Trail, 47°01′25″N 113°59′50″W, el. 5,938 feet (1,810 m)
- East Bowls Ski Trail, 47°01′25″N 113°59′50″W, el. 5,938 feet (1,810 m)
- Far East Ski Trail, 47°01′25″N 113°59′50″W, el. 5,938 feet (1,810 m)
- First Run Ski Trail, 47°01′25″N 113°59′50″W, el. 5,938 feet (1,810 m)
- Foothills Trail, 47°30′25″N 113°37′03″W, el. 4,970 feet (1,510 m)
- Foxtrot Ski Trail, 47°01′25″N 113°59′50″W, el. 5,938 feet (1,810 m)
- Grandstand Ski Trail, 47°01′25″N 113°59′50″W, el. 5,938 feet (1,810 m)
- Granite Ridge Trail, 46°41′19″N 114°35′30″W, el. 5,722 feet (1,744 m)
- Grizzly Chute Ski Trail, 47°01′25″N 113°59′50″W, el. 5,938 feet (1,810 m)
- Grizzly Ski Trail, 47°01′25″N 113°59′50″W, el. 5,938 feet (1,810 m)
- High Roller Ski Trail, 47°01′25″N 113°59′50″W, el. 5,938 feet (1,810 m)
- Holland Falls National Recreation Trail, 47°27′12″N 113°35′16″W, el. 4,068 feet (1,240 m)
- Houle Creek Trail, 47°05′18″N 114°15′53″W, el. 5,535 feet (1,687 m)
- Huckleberry Ski Trail, 47°01′25″N 113°59′50″W, el. 5,938 feet (1,810 m)
- Iris Point Trail, 46°42′05″N 113°43′32″W, el. 5,938 feet (1,810 m)
- Josephine Creek Trail, 47°11′28″N 114°30′38″W, el. 5,184 feet (1,580 m)
- Kennedy Creek Trail, 47°10′38″N 114°24′05″W, el. 7,024 feet (2,141 m)
- Lee Ridge Trail, 46°40′19″N 114°30′58″W, el. 6,132 feet (1,869 m)
- Levitation Ski Trail, 47°01′25″N 113°59′50″W, el. 5,938 feet (1,810 m)
- Longhorn Ski Trail, 47°01′25″N 113°59′50″W, el. 5,938 feet (1,810 m)
- Lower High Park Ski Trail, 47°01′25″N 113°59′50″W, el. 5,938 feet (1,810 m)
- Lower Hot Fudge Ski Trail, 47°01′25″N 113°59′50″W, el. 5,938 feet (1,810 m)
- Lower Paradise Ski Trail, 47°01′25″N 113°59′50″W, el. 5,938 feet (1,810 m)
- Lower Second Thought Ski Trail, 47°01′25″N 113°59′50″W, el. 5,938 feet (1,810 m)
- Lower Sunrise Bowl Ski Trail, 47°01′25″N 113°59′50″W, el. 5,938 feet (1,810 m)
- McCormick Creek Trail, 47°11′51″N 114°26′52″W, el. 6,414 feet (1,955 m)
- Mill Creek Trail (Montana), 46°43′16″N 114°13′01″W, el. 5,777 feet (1,761 m)
- Mission Magic Ski Trail, 47°01′25″N 113°59′50″W, el. 5,938 feet (1,810 m)
- Mogul Alley Ski Trail, 47°01′25″N 113°59′50″W, el. 5,938 feet (1,810 m)
- North Dakota Downhill Ski Trail, 47°01′25″N 113°59′50″W, el. 5,938 feet (1,810 m)
- Purgatory Ski Trail, 47°01′25″N 113°59′50″W, el. 5,938 feet (1,810 m)
- Sally Ridge Trail, 46°42′25″N 114°25′49″W, el. 6,647 feet (2,026 m)
- Second Thought Ski Trail, 47°01′25″N 113°59′50″W, el. 5,938 feet (1,810 m)
- Shining Peak Trail, 47°08′43″N 114°22′39″W, el. 6,601 feet (2,012 m)
- Sixmile Trail, 47°06′06″N 114°18′00″W, el. 5,699 feet (1,737 m)
- Spartan Headwall Ski Trail, 47°01′25″N 113°59′50″W, el. 5,938 feet (1,810 m)
- Tepee Ridge Trail, 46°47′43″N 114°31′14″W, el. 5,128 feet (1,563 m)
- Time Out Cat Walk Ski Trail, 47°01′25″N 113°59′50″W, el. 5,938 feet (1,810 m)
- Upper High Park Ski Trail, 47°01′25″N 113°59′50″W, el. 5,938 feet (1,810 m)
- Upper Hot Fudge Ski Trail, 47°01′25″N 113°59′50″W, el. 5,938 feet (1,810 m)
- Upper Paradise Ski Trail, 47°01′25″N 113°59′50″W, el. 5,938 feet (1,810 m)
- Upper Second Thought Ski Trail, 47°01′25″N 113°59′50″W, el. 5,938 feet (1,810 m)
- Upper Spartan Ski Trail, 47°01′25″N 113°59′50″W, el. 5,938 feet (1,810 m)
- Upper Sunrise Bowl Ski Trail, 47°01′25″N 113°59′50″W, el. 5,938 feet (1,810 m)
- West Bowls Ski Trail, 47°01′25″N 113°59′50″W, el. 5,938 feet (1,810 m)
- West Ridge Ski Trail, 47°01′25″N 113°59′50″W, el. 5,938 feet (1,810 m)
- Whipped Cream Ski Trail, 47°01′25″N 113°59′50″W, el. 5,938 feet (1,810 m)

== See also ==
- List of trails of Montana
- Trails of Yellowstone National Park
