= List of trails of Sanders County, Montana =

There are at least 35 named trails in Sanders County, Montana according to the U.S. Geological Survey, Board of Geographic Names. A trail is defined as: "Route for passage from one point to another; does not include roads or highways (jeep trail, path, ski trail)."

- Bear Creek Trail, 47°50′24″N 115°21′50″W, el. 5,971 feet (1,820 m)
- Bear Paw Trail, 47°57′56″N 115°37′57″W, el. 3,635 feet (1,108 m)
- Berray Mountain Trail, 48°08′10″N 115°47′49″W, el. 4,816 feet (1,468 m)
- Black Peak Trail, 47°45′26″N 115°41′52″W, el. 5,856 feet (1,785 m)
- Cabinet Divide Trail, 47°56′20″N 115°33′29″W, el. 6,050 feet (1,840 m)
- Canyon Peak Trail, 47°53′50″N 115°32′58″W, el. 5,679 feet (1,731 m)
- Cataract Creek Trail, 47°49′21″N 115°23′19″W, el. 6,001 feet (1,829 m)
- Daisy Creek Trail, 47°49′28″N 115°05′33″W, el. 5,508 feet (1,679 m)
- Elk Mountain Trail, 47°52′33″N 115°26′18″W, el. 4,639 feet (1,414 m)
- Emma Peak Pack Trail, 47°40′16″N 115°38′25″W, el. 4,242 feet (1,293 m)
- Engle Lake Trail, 47°59′04″N 115°39′18″W, el. 4,101 feet (1,250 m)
- Engle Peak Trail, 48°00′28″N 115°39′47″W, el. 5,325 feet (1,623 m)
- Goat Peak Trail, 47°59′07″N 115°36′27″W, el. 5,489 feet (1,673 m)
- Goat Ridge Trail, 47°57′57″N 115°36′21″W, el. 5,220 feet (1,590 m)
- Green Mountain Trail, 47°57′19″N 115°40′14″W, el. 4,734 feet (1,443 m)
- Grouse Mountain Trail, 47°50′11″N 115°24′05″W, el. 5,860 feet (1,790 m)
- Huckleberry Mountain Trail, 47°56′47″N 115°47′32″W, el. 4,885 feet (1,489 m)
- Loveland Peak Trail, 47°59′14″N 115°53′45″W, el. 4,974 feet (1,516 m)
- Miller Creek Trail, 47°49′22″N 115°21′47″W, el. 5,738 feet (1,749 m)
- Moose Peak Trail, 47°52′58″N 115°18′46″W, el. 4,944 feet (1,507 m)
- Old Daly Trail, 48°06′12″N 115°43′10″W, el. 5,817 feet (1,773 m)
- Reader Gulch Pack Trail, 47°44′53″N 115°36′51″W, el. 3,881 feet (1,183 m)
- Revais Creek Trail, 47°14′59″N 114°25′11″W, el. 4,308 feet (1,313 m)
- Rice Draw Trail, 48°00′37″N 115°56′00″W, el. 3,871 feet (1,180 m)
- Slide Rock Mountain Trail, 47°47′22″N 115°20′49″W, el. 6,227 feet (1,898 m)
- State Line Trail (Montana), 47°53′19″N 115°56′13″W, el. 5,620 feet (1,710 m)
- Stevens Creek Trail, 47°55′40″N 115°47′53″W, el. 4,157 feet (1,267 m)
- Stevens Ridge Trail, 47°55′22″N 115°51′02″W, el. 4,997 feet (1,523 m)
- Thompson River Mount Headley Trail, 47°45′14″N 115°13′35″W, el. 6,900 feet (2,100 m)
- Twenty Odd Peak Trail, 47°53′08″N 115°34′41″W, el. 5,095 feet (1,553 m)
- Water Hill Trail, 47°48′41″N 115°27′15″W, el. 6,142 feet (1,872 m)
- West Fork Fishtrap Trail, 47°46′19″N 115°13′04″W, el. 6,063 feet (1,848 m)
- West Fork Trail, 47°49′34″N 115°27′35″W, el. 4,534 feet (1,382 m)
- White Pine Ridge Trail, 47°46′27″N 115°34′53″W, el. 4,360 feet (1,330 m)
- Windfall Peak Trail, 47°47′17″N 115°44′40″W, el. 4,695 feet (1,431 m)

== See also ==
- List of trails of Montana
- Trails of Yellowstone National Park
