= List of trails of Gallatin County, Montana =

There are at least 74 named trails in Gallatin County, Montana according to the U.S. Geological Survey, Board of Geographic Names. A trail is defined as: "Route for passage from one point to another; does not include roads or highways (jeep trail, path, ski trail)."

- Alpine Access Ski Trail, 45°49′02″N 110°53′48″W, el. 6,112 feet (1,863 m)
- Alpine Face Ski Trail, 45°49′02″N 110°53′48″W, el. 6,112 feet (1,863 m)
- Alpine Run Ski Trail, 45°49′02″N 110°53′48″W, el. 6,112 feet (1,863 m)
- Avalanche Gulch Ski Trail, 45°49′02″N 110°53′48″W, el. 6,112 feet (1,863 m)
- Bangtail Trail, 45°48′08″N 110°49′37″W, el. 7,421 feet (2,262 m)
- Bitterroot Ski Trail, 45°49′02″N 110°53′48″W, el. 6,112 feet (1,863 m)
- Bobcat Ski Trail, 45°49′02″N 110°53′48″W, el. 6,112 feet (1,863 m)
- Boot Hill Ski Trail, 45°49′02″N 110°53′48″W, el. 6,112 feet (1,863 m)
- Bridger Run Ski Trail, 45°49′02″N 110°53′48″W, el. 6,112 feet (1,863 m)
- Bronco Ski Trail, 45°49′02″N 110°53′48″W, el. 6,112 feet (1,863 m)
- Brush Run Ski Trail, 45°49′02″N 110°53′48″W, el. 6,112 feet (1,863 m)
- Bucks Run Ski Trail, 45°49′02″N 110°53′48″W, el. 6,112 feet (1,863 m)
- Cabin Creek Divide Trail, 44°54′52″N 111°14′50″W, el. 8,471 feet (2,582 m)
- Chalet Road Ski Trail, 45°49′02″N 110°53′48″W, el. 6,112 feet (1,863 m)
- Colters Ski Trail, 45°49′02″N 110°53′48″W, el. 6,112 feet (1,863 m)
- Coyote Flats Ski Trail, 45°49′02″N 110°53′48″W, el. 6,112 feet (1,863 m)
- Deer Park Face Ski Trail, 45°49′02″N 110°53′48″W, el. 6,112 feet (1,863 m)
- Deer Park Road Ski Trail, 45°49′02″N 110°53′48″W, el. 6,112 feet (1,863 m)
- Devils Dive Ski Trail, 45°49′02″N 110°53′48″W, el. 6,112 feet (1,863 m)

- Divide Trail, 45°17′41″N 111°06′01″W, el. 9,852 feet (3,003 m)
- Easy Money Ski Trail, 45°49′02″N 110°53′48″W, el. 6,112 feet (1,863 m)
- Eldridge Trail, 45°02′53″N 111°19′22″W, el. 8,097 feet (2,468 m)
- Emigrant Ski Trail, 45°49′02″N 110°53′48″W, el. 6,112 feet (1,863 m)
- Emils Mile Ski Trail, 45°49′02″N 110°53′48″W, el. 6,112 feet (1,863 m)
- Exit Chute Ski Trail, 45°49′02″N 110°53′48″W, el. 6,112 feet (1,863 m)
- Fawn Pass Trail, 44°57′22″N 111°03′27″W, el. 7,113 feet (2,168 m)
- Flippers Ski Trail, 45°49′02″N 110°53′48″W, el. 6,112 feet (1,863 m)
- Freedom Ski Trail, 45°49′02″N 110°53′48″W, el. 6,112 feet (1,863 m)
- Hantons Hollow Ski Trail, 45°49′02″N 110°53′48″W, el. 6,112 feet (1,863 m)
- High Traverse Ski Trail, 45°49′02″N 110°53′48″W, el. 6,112 feet (1,863 m)
- Kirkwood Trail, 44°52′41″N 111°17′12″W, el. 8,648 feet (2,636 m)
- Last Chance Ski Trail, 45°49′02″N 110°53′48″W, el. 6,112 feet (1,863 m)
- Limestone Ski Trail, 45°49′02″N 110°53′48″W, el. 6,112 feet (1,863 m)

- Little Tepee Creek Trail, 44°49′48″N 111°09′33″W, el. 7,825 feet (2,385 m)
- Little Wapiti Creek Trail, 44°59′20″N 111°16′29″W, el. 8,363 feet (2,549 m)
- Lower Limestone Ski Trail, 45°49′02″N 110°53′48″W, el. 6,112 feet (1,863 m)
- Maverick Ski Trail, 45°49′02″N 110°53′48″W, el. 6,112 feet (1,863 m)
- Missouri Breaks Ski Trail, 45°49′02″N 110°53′48″W, el. 6,112 feet (1,863 m)
- Mogul Mouse Ski Trail, 45°49′02″N 110°53′48″W, el. 6,112 feet (1,863 m)
- Moose Meadows Ski Trail, 45°49′02″N 110°53′48″W, el. 6,112 feet (1,863 m)
- Mully Road Ski Trail, 45°49′02″N 110°53′48″W, el. 6,112 feet (1,863 m)
- North Bowl Road Ski Trail, 45°49′02″N 110°53′48″W, el. 6,112 feet (1,863 m)
- North Bowl Run Ski Trail, 45°49′02″N 110°53′48″W, el. 6,112 feet (1,863 m)
- North Meadows Road Ski Trail, 45°49′02″N 110°53′48″W, el. 6,112 feet (1,863 m)
- Pierres Return Ski Trail, 45°49′02″N 110°53′48″W, el. 6,112 feet (1,863 m)
- Pierres Road Ski Trail, 45°49′02″N 110°53′48″W, el. 6,112 feet (1,863 m)
- Porcupine Ski Trail, 45°49′02″N 110°53′48″W, el. 6,112 feet (1,863 m)
- Powder Hog Ski Trail, 45°49′02″N 110°53′48″W, el. 6,112 feet (1,863 m)
- Powder Horn Ski Trail, 45°49′02″N 110°53′48″W, el. 6,112 feet (1,863 m)
- Powder Park Ski Trail, 45°49′02″N 110°53′48″W, el. 6,112 feet (1,863 m)
- Powder Puff Ski Trail, 45°49′02″N 110°53′48″W, el. 6,112 feet (1,863 m)
- Ptarmigan Ski Trail, 45°49′02″N 110°53′48″W, el. 6,112 feet (1,863 m)
- Rays Road, 45°49′02″N 110°53′48″W, el. 6,112 feet (1,863 m)

- Red Rock Trail, 45°21′09″N 110°57′40″W, el. 7,438 feet (2,267 m)
- Sacajawea Ski Trail, 45°49′02″N 110°53′48″W, el. 6,112 feet (1,863 m)
- Sawmill Gulch Ski Trail, 45°49′02″N 110°53′48″W, el. 6,112 feet (1,863 m)
- Skyline Trail, 44°57′27″N 111°10′36″W, el. 9,829 feet (2,996 m)

- Sluice Box Ski Trail, 45°49′02″N 110°53′48″W, el. 6,112 feet (1,863 m)
- South Boundary Ski Trail, 45°49′02″N 110°53′48″W, el. 6,112 feet (1,863 m)
- South Fork Trail, 46°02′26″N 110°59′33″W, el. 5,472 feet (1,668 m)
- Stock Drive Trail, 45°59′18″N 111°00′28″W, el. 6,312 feet (1,924 m)
- Summer Road Ski Trail, 45°49′02″N 110°53′48″W, el. 6,112 feet (1,863 m)
- Sunnyside Ski Trail, 45°49′02″N 110°53′48″W, el. 6,112 feet (1,863 m)
- The John Ski Trail, 45°49′02″N 110°53′48″W, el. 6,112 feet (1,863 m)
- The Nose Ski Trail, 45°49′02″N 110°53′48″W, el. 6,112 feet (1,863 m)
- Three Bears Bowl Ski Trail, 45°49′02″N 110°53′48″W, el. 6,112 feet (1,863 m)
- Three Bears Traverse Ski Trail, 45°49′02″N 110°53′48″W, el. 6,112 feet (1,863 m)
- Thunder Road Ski Trail, 45°49′02″N 110°53′48″W, el. 6,112 feet (1,863 m)
- Tight Squeeze Ski Trail, 45°49′02″N 110°53′48″W, el. 6,112 feet (1,863 m)
- Wapiti Creek Trail, 44°59′47″N 111°19′27″W, el. 8,005 feet (2,440 m)
- Wapiti Ridge Trail, 45°00′11″N 111°17′59″W, el. 8,337 feet (2,541 m)
- White Lightning Ski Trail, 45°49′02″N 110°53′48″W, el. 6,112 feet (1,863 m)
- Wolverine Ski Trail, 45°49′02″N 110°53′48″W, el. 6,112 feet (1,863 m)
- Zits Ski Trail, 45°49′02″N 110°53′48″W, el. 6,112 feet (1,863 m)

== See also ==
- List of trails of Montana
- Trails of Yellowstone National Park
