= List of trails of Flathead County, Montana =

Flathead County Trail Guide:Explore Montana's Great Outdoors

There are at least 181 named trails in Flathead County, Montana according to the U.S. Geological Survey, Board of Geographic Names. A trail is defined as: "Route for passage from one point to another; does not include roads or highways (jeep trail, path, ski trail)."

- Aeneas Creek Trail, 48°08′04″N 113°53′29″W, el. 4,777 feet (1,456 m)
- Akokala Lake Trail, 48°52′09″N 114°12′17″W, el. 4,672 feet (1,424 m)
- Alpine Trail, 48°13′57″N 114°00′57″W, el. 6,168 feet (1,880 m)
- Alpinglow Alley Ski Trail, 48°29′06″N 114°21′13″W, el. 4,770 feet (1,450 m)
- Ashley Divide Trail, 48°16′31″N 114°42′20″W, el. 6,060 feet (1,850 m)
- Autumn Creek Trail, 48°19′02″N 113°25′04″W, el. 5,377 feet (1,639 m)
- Avalanche Trail, 48°40′02″N 113°49′39″W, el. 3,432 feet (1,046 m)
- Bad Rock Ski Trail, 48°29′06″N 114°21′13″W, el. 4,770 feet (1,450 m)
- Baptiste Lookout Trail, 48°08′08″N 113°39′38″W, el. 5,837 feet (1,779 m)
- Bar Z Trail, 47°59′33″N 114°55′57″W, el. 6,135 feet (1,870 m)
- Barndance Ski Trail, 48°29′06″N 114°21′13″W, el. 4,770 feet (1,450 m)
- Battery Mountain Trail, 48°03′12″N 113°42′22″W, el. 4,675 feet (1,425 m)
- Beargrass Ski Trail, 48°29′06″N 114°21′13″W, el. 4,770 feet (1,450 m)
- Bench Run Ski Trail, 48°29′06″N 114°21′13″W, el. 4,770 feet (1,450 m)
- Big Face Ski Trail, 48°29′06″N 114°21′13″W, el. 4,770 feet (1,450 m)
- Big Ravine Ski Trail, 48°29′06″N 114°21′13″W, el. 4,770 feet (1,450 m)
- Big River Trail, 48°08′35″N 113°24′11″W, el. 4,718 feet (1,438 m)
- Bighorn Ski Trail, 48°29′06″N 114°21′13″W, el. 4,770 feet (1,450 m)
- Black Bear Ski Trail, 48°29′06″N 114°21′13″W, el. 4,770 feet (1,450 m)
- Boulder Pass Trail, 48°58′07″N 114°07′51″W, el. 5,318 feet (1,621 m)
- Boundary Trail, 48°24′26″N 113°42′08″W, el. 3,770 feet (1,150 m)
- Bowl Divide Trail, 47°58′53″N 113°01′40″W, el. 5,666 feet (1,727 m)
- Bowman Lake Trail, 48°53′19″N 114°08′07″W, el. 4,035 feet (1,230 m)
- Bungalow Lookout Trail, 47°48′44″N 113°08′44″W, el. 7,411 feet (2,259 m)
- Calbick Creek Trail, 48°07′37″N 113°10′54″W, el. 5,403 feet (1,647 m)
- Camas Creek Trail, 48°39′36″N 113°57′22″W, el. 4,062 feet (1,238 m)
- Caribou Ski Trail, 48°29′06″N 114°21′13″W, el. 4,770 feet (1,450 m)
- Castle Rock Trail, 48°00′10″N 114°52′12″W, el. 5,036 feet (1,535 m)
- Cedarview Ski Trail, 48°29′06″N 114°21′13″W, el. 4,770 feet (1,450 m)
- Chair Mountain Trail, 47°58′02″N 113°08′00″W, el. 6,437 feet (1,962 m)
- Chipmunk Ski Trail, 48°29′06″N 114°21′13″W, el. 4,770 feet (1,450 m)
- Coal Creek Fire Trail, 48°24′55″N 113°38′15″W, el. 3,921 feet (1,195 m)
- Columbia Mountain Trail, 48°20′27″N 114°04′01″W, el. 5,590 feet (1,700 m)
- Connies Coulee Ski Trail, 48°29′06″N 114°21′13″W, el. 4,770 feet (1,450 m)
- Corkscrew Ski Trail, 48°29′06″N 114°21′13″W, el. 4,770 feet (1,450 m)
- Cut Bank Pass Trail, 48°33′50″N 113°27′15″W, el. 5,381 feet (1,640 m)
- Danny on Memorial National Recreation Trail, 48°29′30″N 114°20′05″W, el. 5,653 feet (1,723 m)
- Devil Creek Trail, 48°14′14″N 113°26′57″W, el. 4,856 feet (1,480 m)
- Dirtyface-Logan Creek Trail, 48°10′47″N 113°36′21″W, el. 4,662 feet (1,421 m)
- Doris Creek Trail, 48°16′55″N 114°04′07″W, el. 5,961 feet (1,817 m)
- East Rim Face Ski Trail, 48°29′06″N 114°21′13″W, el. 4,770 feet (1,450 m)
- East Rim Ski Trail, 48°29′06″N 114°21′13″W, el. 4,770 feet (1,450 m)
- Edna Creek Trail, 48°13′01″N 113°31′58″W, el. 5,797 feet (1,767 m)
- Eds Run Ski Trail, 48°29′06″N 114°21′13″W, el. 4,770 feet (1,450 m)
- Elkweed Ski Trail, 48°29′06″N 114°21′13″W, el. 4,770 feet (1,450 m)
- Evans Heaven Ski Trail, 48°29′06″N 114°21′13″W, el. 4,770 feet (1,450 m)
- Expressway Ski Trail, 48°29′06″N 114°21′13″W, el. 4,770 feet (1,450 m)
- Fault One Ski Trail, 48°29′06″N 114°21′13″W, el. 4,770 feet (1,450 m)
- Fault Three Ski Trail, 48°29′06″N 114°21′13″W, el. 4,770 feet (1,450 m)
- Fault Two Ski Trail, 48°29′06″N 114°21′13″W, el. 4,770 feet (1,450 m)
- Felix Basin Trail, 48°11′15″N 113°43′44″W, el. 4,180 feet (1,270 m)
- Fielding Coal Creek Fire Trail, 48°24′08″N 113°36′30″W, el. 4,682 feet (1,427 m)
- Fielding Coal Creek Trail, 48°20′14″N 113°33′05″W, el. 4,003 feet (1,220 m)
- Flattop Mountain Trail, 48°46′42″N 113°50′10″W, el. 5,495 feet (1,675 m)
- Fort Steele Trail, 48°35′20″N 114°37′45″W, el. 3,271 feet (997 m)
- Georges Gorge Ski Trail, 48°29′06″N 114°21′13″W, el. 4,770 feet (1,450 m)
- Giefer Twentyfive Mile Creek Trail, 48°13′50″N 113°23′39″W, el. 6,079 feet (1,853 m)
- Goat Haunt Ski Trail, 48°29′06″N 114°21′13″W, el. 4,770 feet (1,450 m)
- Good Medicine Ski Trail, 48°29′06″N 114°21′13″W, el. 4,770 feet (1,450 m)
- Granite Creek Trail, 48°09′56″N 113°20′42″W, el. 4,626 feet (1,410 m)
- Granite Park Trail, 48°45′39″N 113°48′02″W, el. 5,075 feet (1,547 m)
- Granite-Morrison Trail, 48°10′07″N 113°18′35″W, el. 6,493 feet (1,979 m)
- Grant Ridge Trail, 48°21′12″N 113°43′56″W, el. 6,476 feet (1,974 m)
- Graves Creek Trail, 48°10′26″N 113°54′34″W, el. 5,554 feet (1,693 m)
- Gray Wolf Ski Trail, 48°29′06″N 114°21′13″W, el. 4,770 feet (1,450 m)
- Grays Golf Course Ski Trail, 48°29′06″N 114°21′13″W, el. 4,770 feet (1,450 m)
- Green Mountain Trail, 47°57′41″N 113°22′45″W, el. 7,070 feet (2,150 m)
- Griffin Creek Trail, 48°20′18″N 114°43′24″W, el. 4,101 feet (1,250 m)
- Griffin Creek Trail, 48°16′50″N 114°45′40″W, el. 4,498 feet (1,371 m)
- Gunsight Pass Trail, 48°36′04″N 113°49′23″W, el. 4,964 feet (1,513 m)
- Gunsight Trail, 47°57′18″N 113°17′39″W, el. 6,706 feet (2,044 m)
- Haileys Ski Trail, 48°29′06″N 114°21′13″W, el. 4,770 feet (1,450 m)
- Harris Ridge Trail, 48°12′36″N 113°43′26″W, el. 5,620 feet (1,710 m)
- Haskill Slide Ski Trail, 48°29′06″N 114°21′13″W, el. 4,770 feet (1,450 m)
- Head Wall Ski Trail, 48°29′06″N 114°21′13″W, el. 4,770 feet (1,450 m)
- Heaven Ski Trail, 48°29′06″N 114°21′13″W, el. 4,770 feet (1,450 m)
- Heep Steep Ski Trail, 48°29′06″N 114°21′13″W, el. 4,770 feet (1,450 m)
- Helen Creek Trail, 47°41′14″N 113°14′12″W, el. 6,624 feet (2,019 m)
- Hell Fire Ski Trail, 48°29′06″N 114°21′13″W, el. 4,770 feet (1,450 m)
- Hellroaring Ski Trail, 48°29′06″N 114°21′13″W, el. 4,770 feet (1,450 m)
- Hibernation Ski Trail, 48°29′06″N 114°21′13″W, el. 4,770 feet (1,450 m)
- Highline Trail, 48°46′12″N 113°45′46″W, el. 6,571 feet (2,003 m)
- Hogans East Ski Trail, 48°29′06″N 114°21′13″W, el. 4,770 feet (1,450 m)
- Hogans Ski Trail, 48°29′06″N 114°21′13″W, el. 4,770 feet (1,450 m)
- Home Again Ski Trail, 48°29′06″N 114°21′13″W, el. 4,770 feet (1,450 m)
- Hope Slope Ski Trail, 48°29′06″N 114°21′13″W, el. 4,770 feet (1,450 m)
- Howe Lake Trail, 48°36′14″N 114°00′43″W, el. 4,049 feet (1,234 m)
- Huckleberry Patch Ski Trail, 48°29′06″N 114°21′13″W, el. 4,770 feet (1,450 m)
- Inspiration Ski Trail, 48°29′06″N 114°21′13″W, el. 4,770 feet (1,450 m)
- Interstate Ski Trail, 48°29′06″N 114°21′13″W, el. 4,770 feet (1,450 m)
- Jimmie Ridge Trail, 48°14′20″N 113°59′02″W, el. 6,522 feet (1,988 m)
- Kodiak Ski Trail, 48°29′06″N 114°21′13″W, el. 4,770 feet (1,450 m)
- Langley Ski Trail, 48°29′06″N 114°21′13″W, el. 4,770 feet (1,450 m)
- Larch Hill Trail, 47°44′28″N 113°09′52″W, el. 7,415 feet (2,260 m)
- Larch Ski Trail, 48°29′06″N 114°21′13″W, el. 4,770 feet (1,450 m)
- Lincoln Lake Trail, 48°34′26″N 113°52′06″W, el. 4,636 feet (1,413 m)
- Lion Creek Trail, 47°40′38″N 113°34′20″W, el. 5,886 feet (1,794 m)
- Lodgepole Creek Trail, 48°08′44″N 113°11′11″W, el. 6,194 feet (1,888 m)
- Logan Creek Trail, 48°16′30″N 114°39′39″W, el. 4,583 feet (1,397 m)
- Loneman Mountain Trail, 48°28′37″N 113°46′49″W, el. 4,800 feet (1,500 m)
- Lower Mullys Ski Trail, 48°29′06″N 114°21′13″W, el. 4,770 feet (1,450 m)
- Lupine Lake Trail, 48°17′13″N 114°44′07″W, el. 5,144 feet (1,568 m)
- Marmot Ski Trail, 48°29′06″N 114°21′13″W, el. 4,770 feet (1,450 m)
- McDonald Creek Trail, 48°45′21″N 113°48′59″W, el. 3,829 feet (1,167 m)
- Meadow Creek Trail, 48°17′41″N 114°40′55″W, el. 5,026 feet (1,532 m)
- Micho Trail, 48°29′10″N 114°19′14″W, el. 5,443 feet (1,659 m)
- Middle Fork Ski Trail, 48°29′06″N 114°21′13″W, el. 4,770 feet (1,450 m)
- Miner Creek Trail, 48°02′53″N 113°21′06″W, el. 5,262 feet (1,604 m)
- Moe Mentum Ski Trail, 48°29′06″N 114°21′13″W, el. 4,770 feet (1,450 m)
- Moose Ski Trail, 48°29′06″N 114°21′13″W, el. 4,770 feet (1,450 m)
- Mount Bradley Trail, 48°10′13″N 113°27′07″W, el. 7,162 feet (2,183 m)
- Mount Brown Lookout Trail, 48°37′14″N 113°50′34″W, el. 6,024 feet (1,836 m)
- Mountain Meadow Trail, 48°19′53″N 114°33′53″W, el. 5,154 feet (1,571 m)
- Movieland Ski Trail, 48°29′06″N 114°21′13″W, el. 4,770 feet (1,450 m)
- Mule Creek Trail, 48°15′58″N 113°22′48″W, el. 5,876 feet (1,791 m)
- Mule Ridge Trail, 48°16′29″N 113°23′13″W, el. 6,142 feet (1,872 m)
- Murr Peak Trail, 47°58′44″N 114°52′19″W, el. 5,335 feet (1,626 m)
- Murray Canyon Trail, 48°13′05″N 113°44′11″W, el. 4,908 feet (1,496 m)
- Muskrat Creek Trail, 48°08′28″N 113°04′17″W, el. 5,961 feet (1,817 m)
- No Name Ski Trail, 48°29′06″N 114°21′13″W, el. 4,770 feet (1,450 m)
- Noisy Creek Notch Trail, 48°10′06″N 113°56′33″W, el. 6,355 feet (1,937 m)
- North Bowl Face Ski Trail, 48°29′06″N 114°21′13″W, el. 4,770 feet (1,450 m)
- Numa Ridge Lookout Trail, 48°51′44″N 114°11′23″W, el. 4,905 feet (1,495 m)
- Oettiker Creek Trail, 48°20′47″N 114°36′14″W, el. 5,321 feet (1,622 m)
- Ole Creek Trail, 48°23′18″N 113°22′18″W, el. 5,650 feet (1,720 m)
- Ousel Peak Trail, 48°26′56″N 113°54′01″W, el. 6,778 feet (2,066 m)
- Paint Creek Trail, 48°11′06″N 113°41′08″W, el. 5,495 feet (1,675 m)
- Park Creek Trail, 48°21′58″N 113°29′26″W, el. 4,416 feet (1,346 m)
- Pentagon Clack Creek Trail, 47°54′03″N 113°08′03″W, el. 5,518 feet (1,682 m)
- Picnic Chutes Ski Trail, 48°29′06″N 114°21′13″W, el. 4,770 feet (1,450 m)
- Pioneer Ridge Trail, 48°11′36″N 113°53′02″W, el. 6,030 feet (1,840 m)
- Pitamakan Pass Trail, 48°32′13″N 113°28′49″W, el. 6,299 feet (1,920 m)
- Powder Bowl Ski Trail, 48°29′06″N 114°21′13″W, el. 4,770 feet (1,450 m)
- Powder Trap Ski Trail, 48°29′06″N 114°21′13″W, el. 4,770 feet (1,450 m)
- Ptarmigan Bowl Ski Trail, 48°29′06″N 114°21′13″W, el. 4,770 feet (1,450 m)
- Quartz Lake Trail, 48°50′33″N 114°09′00″W, el. 5,420 feet (1,650 m)
- QuestionMark Ski Trail, 48°29′06″N 114°21′13″W, el. 4,770 feet (1,450 m)
- Ralph Thayer Memorial Trail, 48°40′20″N 114°31′01″W, el. 6,211 feet (1,893 m)
- Red Plume Trail, 48°08′04″N 113°17′38″W, el. 6,788 feet (2,069 m)
- Reid Divide Trail, 48°19′32″N 114°35′09″W, el. 5,653 feet (1,723 m)
- Russ Street Ski Trail, 48°29′06″N 114°21′13″W, el. 4,770 feet (1,450 m)
- Satans Abyss Ski Trail, 48°29′06″N 114°21′13″W, el. 4,770 feet (1,450 m)
- Satans Traverse Ski Trail, 48°29′06″N 114°21′13″W, el. 4,770 feet (1,450 m)
- Schmidts Chute Ski Trail, 48°29′06″N 114°21′13″W, el. 4,770 feet (1,450 m)
- Sheep Creek Trail, 48°12′21″N 113°39′40″W, el. 6,388 feet (1,947 m)
- Short Cut Ski Trail, 48°29′06″N 114°21′13″W, el. 4,770 feet (1,450 m)
- Silvertip Ski Trail, 48°29′06″N 114°21′13″W, el. 4,770 feet (1,450 m)
- Ski Way Ski Trail, 48°29′06″N 114°21′13″W, el. 4,770 feet (1,450 m)
- Skyland-Morrison Creek Trail, 48°12′22″N 113°17′54″W, el. 5,620 feet (1,710 m)
- Skyland-Puzzle Creek Trail, 48°14′28″N 113°16′42″W, el. 6,325 feet (1,928 m)
- Slalom Ski Trail, 48°29′06″N 114°21′13″W, el. 4,770 feet (1,450 m)
- Sling Shot Ski Trail, 48°29′06″N 114°21′13″W, el. 4,770 feet (1,450 m)
- Smith Creek Trail, 47°36′27″N 113°36′37″W, el. 6,506 feet (1,983 m)
- Snake Creek Loop, 48°14′51″N 113°23′18″W, el. 5,669 feet (1,728 m)
- Snyder Lake Trail, 48°37′02″N 113°49′14″W, el. 4,846 feet (1,477 m)
- Snyder Ridge Trail, 48°35′40″N 113°51′48″W, el. 4,649 feet (1,417 m)
- South Boundary Trail, 48°30′12″N 113°56′01″W, el. 3,360 feet (1,020 m)
- Spotted Bear Mountain Trail, 47°54′58″N 113°28′08″W, el. 5,922 feet (1,805 m)
- Spotted Bear River Trail, 47°44′45″N 113°06′53″W, el. 6,493 feet (1,979 m)
- Spotted Bear Schafer Trail, 47°58′35″N 113°22′17″W, el. 6,834 feet (2,083 m)
- Spruce Park Moose Lake Trail, 48°11′14″N 113°28′18″W, el. 5,791 feet (1,765 m)
- Spy Mountain Trail, 47°58′38″N 113°23′49″W, el. 6,939 feet (2,115 m)
- Summit Trail, 48°19′17″N 113°21′56″W, el. 5,285 feet (1,611 m)
- Sunrise Loop Ski Trail, 48°29′06″N 114°21′13″W, el. 4,770 feet (1,450 m)
- Surprise Pass Trail, 48°29′17″N 113°32′46″W, el. 5,666 feet (1,727 m)
- Swift Creek Ski Trail, 48°29′06″N 114°21′13″W, el. 4,770 feet (1,450 m)
- Tally Mountain Billy Creek Trail, 48°21′07″N 114°35′13″W, el. 5,597 feet (1,706 m)
- Teepee Ski Trail, 48°29′06″N 114°21′13″W, el. 4,770 feet (1,450 m)
- Three Stooges Ski Trail, 48°29′06″N 114°21′13″W, el. 4,770 feet (1,450 m)
- Threetops Trail, 48°26′06″N 113°44′00″W, el. 4,380 feet (1,340 m)
- Tongue Mountain Trail, 48°11′42″N 113°55′19″W, el. 6,726 feet (2,050 m)
- Toni Matt Ski Trail, 48°29′06″N 114°21′13″W, el. 4,770 feet (1,450 m)
- Two Way Ski Trail, 48°29′06″N 114°21′13″W, el. 4,770 feet (1,450 m)
- Upper Mullys Ski Trail, 48°29′06″N 114°21′13″W, el. 4,770 feet (1,450 m)
- West Dawson Pass Trail, 48°30′16″N 113°31′02″W, el. 4,911 feet (1,497 m)
- West Lakes Trail, 48°41′59″N 114°05′25″W, el. 3,901 feet (1,189 m)
- White River Trail, 47°44′26″N 113°11′23″W, el. 6,001 feet (1,829 m)
- Whitefish Divide-Smokey Range National Recreation Trail, 48°32′57″N 114°24′29″W, el. 6,302 feet (1,921 m)
- Whitetail Ski Trail, 48°29′06″N 114°21′13″W, el. 4,770 feet (1,450 m)
- Wolf Creek Trail, 48°06′27″N 113°55′56″W, el. 4,413 feet (1,345 m)
- Wood Lot Ski Trail, 48°29′06″N 114°21′13″W, el. 4,770 feet (1,450 m)

== See also ==
- List of trails of Montana
- Trails of Yellowstone National Park
