= List of trails of Beaverhead County, Montana =

There are at least 20 named trails in Beaverhead County, Montana according to the U.S. Geological Survey, Board of Geographic Names. A trail is defined as: "Route for passage from one point to another; does not include roads or highways (jeep trail, path, ski trail)."

- Alder Creek Trail, 45°44′26″N 113°10′17″W, el. 8,261 feet (2,518 m)
- Blue Creek Trail, 45°27′56″N 113°10′12″W, el. 7,848 feet (2,392 m)
- Bobcat Lakes Trail, 45°36′30″N 113°12′07″W, el. 8,261 feet (2,518 m)
- Bull Creek Polecreek Trail, 45°23′01″N 113°13′49″W, el. 8,074 feet (2,461 m)
- Copper Creek Trail, 45°39′05″N 113°11′44″W, el. 8,205 feet (2,501 m)
- Cornell Trail, 44°48′05″N 112°14′44″W, el. 8,717 feet (2,657 m)
- Driveway Trail, 45°27′31″N 113°05′26″W, el. 7,526 feet (2,294 m)
- Gold Creek Trail, 45°36′19″N 112°58′31″W, el. 8,074 feet (2,461 m)
- Grassy Lake Trail, 45°36′46″N 113°13′56″W, el. 8,717 feet (2,657 m)
- Hidden Pasture Trail, 44°42′09″N 112°47′00″W, el. 8,087 feet (2,465 m)
- Hiline Trail, 45°44′20″N 113°11′33″W, el. 8,366 feet (2,550 m)
- Lodgepole Trail, 44°48′36″N 112°08′57″W, el. 8,097 feet (2,468 m)
- Old Tim Creek Trail, 45°28′34″N 113°13′38″W, el. 7,559 feet (2,304 m)
- Pole Creek Trail, 45°24′36″N 113°11′52″W, el. 8,058 feet (2,456 m)
- Rhubarb Patch Trail, 45°26′24″N 113°05′07″W, el. 7,165 feet (2,184 m)
- Sawtooth Trail, 44°48′22″N 112°13′35″W, el. 9,134 feet (2,784 m)
- Shoestring Creek Bear Wallow Creek Trail, 45°29′35″N 113°10′45″W, el. 8,113 feet (2,473 m)
- Snowcrest Trail, 44°48′48″N 112°06′14″W, el. 9,836 feet (2,998 m)
- Stine Creek Trail, 45°44′10″N 113°03′05″W, el. 7,697 feet (2,346 m)
- Table Mountain Trail, 44°31′39″N 112°01′56″W, el. 8,855 feet (2,699 m)

== See also ==
- List of trails of Montana
- Trails of Yellowstone National Park
