= List of trails of Granite County, Montana =

There are at least 52 named trails in Granite County, Montana according to the U.S. Geological Survey, Board of Geographic Names. A trail is defined as: "Route for passage from one point to another; does not include roads or highways (jeep trail, path, ski trail)."

- Atlantic Cable Ski Trail, 46°15′23″N 113°14′31″W, el. 7,116 feet (2,169 m)
- Bad Finger Ski Trail, 46°15′23″N 113°14′31″W, el. 7,116 feet (2,169 m)
- Berkely Ski Trail, 46°15′23″N 113°14′31″W, el. 7,116 feet (2,169 m)
- Black Pine Ridge Trail Number 6, 46°27′19″N 113°27′06″W, el. 7,447 feet (2,270 m)
- Black Pine Trail, 46°30′45″N 113°27′27″W, el. 7,621 feet (2,323 m)
- Boulder Lakes Trail, 46°21′19″N 113°07′04″W, el. 7,113 feet (2,168 m)
- Butte Cabin Ridge Trail, 46°29′32″N 113°40′21″W, el. 7,933 feet (2,418 m)
- Butte Cabin Ridge Trail, 46°31′18″N 113°40′44″W, el. 7,844 feet (2,391 m)
- Catcha Wave Ski Trail, 46°15′23″N 113°14′31″W, el. 7,116 feet (2,169 m)
- Christmas Park Ski Trail, 46°15′23″N 113°14′31″W, el. 7,116 feet (2,169 m)
- Claimjumper Ski Trail, 46°15′23″N 113°14′31″W, el. 7,116 feet (2,169 m)
- Combination Trail Number 3, 46°26′54″N 113°25′23″W, el. 6,896 feet (2,102 m)
- Eightmile Harvey Ridge Trail, 46°36′01″N 113°29′11″W, el. 6,309 feet (1,923 m)
- Gold Bug Ski Trail, 46°15′23″N 113°14′31″W, el. 7,116 feet (2,169 m)
- Gold Rush Ski Trail, 46°15′23″N 113°14′31″W, el. 7,116 feet (2,169 m)
- Good Finger Ski Trail, 46°15′23″N 113°14′31″W, el. 7,116 feet (2,169 m)
- Grizzly Creek Trail, 46°34′02″N 113°36′17″W, el. 4,951 feet (1,509 m)
- Guns and Roses Ski Trail, 46°15′23″N 113°14′31″W, el. 7,116 feet (2,169 m)
- Haunted Forest Ski Trail, 46°15′23″N 113°14′31″W, el. 7,116 feet (2,169 m)
- Hi Line Trail, 45°57′15″N 113°30′55″W, el. 8,583 feet (2,616 m)
- Hogback Ridge Trail, 46°27′56″N 113°39′12″W, el. 7,900 feet (2,400 m)
- John Long Trail, 46°38′46″N 113°31′10″W, el. 6,453 feet (1,967 m)
- Limelight Ski Trail, 46°15′23″N 113°14′31″W, el. 7,116 feet (2,169 m)
- Little Finger Ski Trail, 46°15′23″N 113°14′31″W, el. 7,116 feet (2,169 m)
- Lower Willow Creek Trail Number Four, 46°28′53″N 113°21′38″W, el. 6,447 feet (1,965 m)
- Lums Run Ski Trail, 46°15′23″N 113°14′31″W, el. 7,116 feet (2,169 m)
- Maloney Trail Number 5, 46°29′01″N 113°28′37″W, el. 6,690 feet (2,040 m)
- Manhattan Ski Trail, 46°15′23″N 113°14′31″W, el. 7,116 feet (2,169 m)
- Maverick Ski Trail, 46°15′23″N 113°14′31″W, el. 7,116 feet (2,169 m)
- Medicine Ridge Ski Trail, 46°15′23″N 113°14′31″W, el. 7,116 feet (2,169 m)
- Mills Road Ski Trail, 46°15′23″N 113°14′31″W, el. 7,116 feet (2,169 m)
- Mother Lode Ski Trail, 46°15′23″N 113°14′31″W, el. 7,116 feet (2,169 m)
- Northern Lights Ski Trail, 46°15′23″N 113°14′31″W, el. 7,116 feet (2,169 m)
- Old Number Seven Ski Trail, 46°15′23″N 113°14′31″W, el. 7,116 feet (2,169 m)
- Otters Hump Trail, 46°34′02″N 113°36′17″W, el. 4,951 feet (1,509 m)
- Platinum Ski Trail, 46°15′23″N 113°14′31″W, el. 7,116 feet (2,169 m)
- Pole Ridge Trail, 46°32′54″N 113°29′09″W, el. 7,109 feet (2,167 m)
- Quigg Peak Trail, 46°28′57″N 113°41′14″W, el. 8,022 feet (2,445 m)
- Ranch Creek Trail, 46°28′27″N 113°36′10″W, el. 6,358 feet (1,938 m)
- Red Lion Ski Trail, 46°15′23″N 113°14′31″W, el. 7,116 feet (2,169 m)
- Sandstone Ridge Trail, 46°27′02″N 113°34′22″W, el. 7,657 feet (2,334 m)
- Sapphire Ski Trail, 46°15′23″N 113°14′32″W, el. 7,129 feet (2,173 m)
- Silver Bow Ski Trail, 46°15′23″N 113°14′31″W, el. 7,116 feet (2,169 m)
- Sluice Box Ski Trail, 46°15′23″N 113°14′31″W, el. 7,116 feet (2,169 m)
- Snaggle Tooth Ski Trail, 46°15′23″N 113°14′31″W, el. 7,116 feet (2,169 m)
- Solomon Ridge Trail, 46°39′17″N 113°42′24″W, el. 6,516 feet (1,986 m)
- Southern Cross Ski Trail, 46°15′23″N 113°14′31″W, el. 7,116 feet (2,169 m)
- Spooky Hollow Ski Trail, 46°15′23″N 113°14′31″W, el. 7,116 feet (2,169 m)
- Tenderfoot Ski Trail, 46°15′23″N 113°14′31″W, el. 7,116 feet (2,169 m)
- Terminator Ski Trail, 46°15′23″N 113°14′31″W, el. 7,116 feet (2,169 m)
- The Pitch Ski Trail, 46°15′23″N 113°14′31″W, el. 7,116 feet (2,169 m)
- Willow Harvey Divide Trail, 46°34′09″N 113°31′21″W, el. 7,365 feet (2,245 m)

== See also ==
- List of trails of Montana
- Trails of Yellowstone National Park
