= List of trails of Glacier County, Montana =

There are at least 38 named trails in Glacier County, Montana according to the U.S. Geological Survey, Board of Geographic Names. A trail is defined as: "Route for passage from one point to another; does not include roads or highways (jeep trail, path, ski trail)."

- Boulder Ridge Trail, 48°48′07″N 113°35′30″W, el. 5,039 feet (1,536 m)
- Boundary Trail, 48°30′35″N 113°20′17″W, el. 5,161 feet (1,573 m)
- Buttercup Park Trail, 48°27′11″N 113°23′44″W, el. 5,430 feet (1,660 m)
- Cosley Lake Cutoff Trail, 48°55′48″N 113°44′00″W, el. 4,856 feet (1,480 m)
- Cracker Lake Trail, 48°46′20″N 113°37′27″W, el. 5,440 feet (1,660 m)
- Cutoff Trail, 48°49′49″N 113°35′09″W, el. 5,528 feet (1,685 m)
- Dawson Pass Trail, 48°28′41″N 113°25′26″W, el. 5,367 feet (1,636 m)
- Dry Fork Trail, 48°30′31″N 113°21′40″W, el. 5,613 feet (1,711 m)
- Firebrand Pass Trail, 48°24′01″N 113°19′07″W, el. 6,152 feet (1,875 m)
- Gable Pass Trail, 48°55′11″N 113°40′09″W, el. 6,936 feet (2,114 m)
- Glacier Park Autumn Creek Trail, 48°24′51″N 113°17′48″W, el. 5,469 feet (1,667 m)
- Grinnell Glacier Trail, 48°46′26″N 113°42′23″W, el. 5,787 feet (1,764 m)
- Gunsight Pass Trail, 48°38′04″N 113°41′52″W, el. 5,207 feet (1,587 m)
- Helen Lake Trail, 48°51′29″N 113°44′24″W, el. 4,961 feet (1,512 m)
- Hidden Lake Trail, 48°41′27″N 113°43′53″W, el. 7,021 feet (2,140 m)
- Iceberg Lake Trail, 48°49′31″N 113°43′58″W, el. 6,138 feet (1,871 m)
- Jackson Glacier Trail, 48°37′19″N 113°42′05″W, el. 5,820 feet (1,770 m)
- Many Falls Trail, 48°40′17″N 113°36′34″W, el. 4,596 feet (1,401 m)
- Medicine Grizzly Trail, 48°34′09″N 113°29′19″W, el. 5,597 feet (1,706 m)
- Mount Henry Trail, 48°28′50″N 113°19′37″W, el. 7,395 feet (2,254 m)
- North Boundary Trail, 48°59′48″N 113°57′49″W, el. 4,839 feet (1,475 m)
- North Fork Belly River Trail, 48°59′37″N 113°43′43″W, el. 6,043 feet (1,842 m)
- Piegan Pass Trail, 48°45′29″N 113°41′40″W, el. 5,276 feet (1,608 m)
- Ptarmigan Trail, 48°52′22″N 113°42′31″W, el. 5,997 feet (1,828 m)
- Red Eagle Trail, 48°40′24″N 113°29′06″W, el. 4,695 feet (1,431 m)
- Redgap Pass Trail, 48°51′25″N 113°40′20″W, el. 6,401 feet (1,951 m)
- Saint Mary Lake Trail, 48°40′49″N 113°31′04″W, el. 4,511 feet (1,375 m)
- Siyeh Bend Cut-Off Trail, 48°41′58″N 113°39′49″W, el. 6,089 feet (1,856 m)
- Siyeh Pass Trail, 48°42′43″N 113°37′26″W, el. 7,477 feet (2,279 m)
- South Shore Trail, 48°28′18″N 113°22′49″W, el. 5,249 feet (1,600 m)
- Stoney Indian Pass Trail, 48°52′42″N 113°51′35″W, el. 6,565 feet (2,001 m)
- Swiftcurrent Pass Trail, 48°47′44″N 113°42′50″W, el. 5,148 feet (1,569 m)
- Triple Divide Trail, 48°36′19″N 113°31′30″W, el. 5,502 feet (1,677 m)
- Two Medicine Pass Trail, 48°26′34″N 113°25′18″W, el. 6,293 feet (1,918 m)
- Two Medicine-Elk Calf Mountain National Recreation Trail, 48°17′41″N 113°14′29″W, el. 5,449 feet (1,661 m)
- Upper Two Medicine Trail, 48°28′15″N 113°26′04″W, el. 5,348 feet (1,630 m)
- Water Ouzel Trail, 48°40′38″N 113°35′06″W, el. 4,632 feet (1,412 m)
- Waterton Valley Trail, 48°52′10″N 113°53′55″W, el. 5,856 feet (1,785 m)

== See also ==
- List of trails of Montana
- Trails of Yellowstone National Park
