= List of trails of Lincoln County, Montana =

There are at least 56 named trails in Lincoln County, Montana according to the U.S. Geological Survey, Board of Geographic Names. A trail is defined as: "Route for passage from one point to another; does not include roads or highways (jeep trail, path, ski trail)."

- Allen Peak Trail, 47°56′38″N 115°24′12″W, el. 6,519 feet (1,987 m)
- Back Side of the Moon Ski Trail, 48°36′18″N 115°37′50″W, el. 3,855 feet (1,175 m)
- Bear Lakes Trail, 47°58′07″N 115°29′46″W, el. 4,990 feet (1,520 m)
- Big Red Ski Trail, 48°36′18″N 115°37′50″W, el. 3,855 feet (1,175 m)
- Blacktail Trail, 47°55′59″N 115°19′14″W, el. 4,413 feet (1,345 m)
- Boulevard Ski Trail, 48°36′18″N 115°37′50″W, el. 3,855 feet (1,175 m)
- Boundary Run Ski Trail, 48°36′18″N 115°37′50″W, el. 3,855 feet (1,175 m)
- Calx Mountain Trail, 48°14′01″N 115°10′08″W, el. 4,826 feet (1,471 m)
- Chans Run Ski Trail, 48°36′18″N 115°37′50″W, el. 3,855 feet (1,175 m)
- Cornices Ski Trail, 48°36′18″N 115°37′50″W, el. 3,855 feet (1,175 m)
- Coyote Creek Trail, 48°08′37″N 115°23′46″W, el. 5,026 feet (1,532 m)
- Crowell Trail, 48°16′34″N 115°49′00″W, el. 4,111 feet (1,253 m)
- Divide Cutoff Trail, 47°58′41″N 115°30′42″W, el. 5,512 feet (1,680 m)
- Divide Trail, 48°09′06″N 115°13′06″W, el. 3,599 feet (1,097 m)
- Divide Trail, 48°00′40″N 115°27′48″W, el. 4,439 feet (1,353 m)
- Elk Basin Ski Trail, 48°36′18″N 115°37′50″W, el. 3,855 feet (1,175 m)
- Elk Mountain National Recreation Trail, 48°25′12″N 114°51′45″W, el. 5,663 feet (1,726 m)
- Far North Ski Trail, 48°36′18″N 115°37′50″W, el. 3,855 feet (1,175 m)
- Fisher Mountain Trail, 48°12′24″N 115°22′18″W, el. 5,423 feet (1,653 m)
- Goat Mountain Trail, 48°24′10″N 115°57′51″W, el. 4,442 feet (1,354 m)
- Grouse Lake Trail, 48°21′29″N 115°53′36″W, el. 2,838 feet (865 m)
- Himes Creek Trail, 47°55′47″N 115°23′27″W, el. 5,282 feet (1,610 m)
- Holes Hell Ski Trail, 48°36′18″N 115°37′50″W, el. 3,855 feet (1,175 m)
- Horse Mountain Trail, 48°07′44″N 115°27′16″W, el. 3,852 feet (1,174 m)
- Iron Meadow Trail, 48°01′22″N 115°29′12″W, el. 3,428 feet (1,045 m)
- Jeep Road Plus Ski Trail, 48°36′18″N 115°37′50″W, el. 3,855 feet (1,175 m)
- Lake Creek Trail, 48°00′46″N 115°30′30″W, el. 4,455 feet (1,358 m)
- Lake Creek Trail, 47°59′38″N 115°30′19″W, el. 4,646 feet (1,416 m)
- Libby Divide Trail, 48°06′43″N 115°29′07″W, el. 5,285 feet (1,611 m)
- Lower Mambo Ski Trail, 48°36′18″N 115°37′50″W, el. 3,855 feet (1,175 m)
- Main Ski Trail, 48°36′18″N 115°37′50″W, el. 3,855 feet (1,175 m)
- Meadow Ridge Trail, 48°07′01″N 115°00′51″W, el. 5,633 feet (1,717 m)
- Mixing Bowl Ski Trail, 48°36′18″N 115°37′50″W, el. 3,855 feet (1,175 m)
- Mount Marston National Recreation Trail, 48°45′25″N 114°48′01″W, el. 6,696 feet (2,041 m)
- Near South Ski Trail, 48°36′18″N 115°37′50″W, el. 3,855 feet (1,175 m)
- Newton Gulch Trail, 48°41′05″N 115°59′19″W, el. 4,554 feet (1,388 m)
- NoGo Ski Trail, 48°36′18″N 115°37′50″W, el. 3,855 feet (1,175 m)
- North Ski Trail, 48°36′18″N 115°37′50″W, el. 3,855 feet (1,175 m)
- Pig Chute Number One Ski Trail, 48°36′18″N 115°37′50″W, el. 3,855 feet (1,175 m)
- Pig Chute Number Two Ski Trail, 48°36′18″N 115°37′50″W, el. 3,855 feet (1,175 m)
- Pine Creek Trail, 48°40′10″N 115°57′49″W, el. 4,393 feet (1,339 m)
- Pneumonia Ridge Ski Trail, 48°36′18″N 115°37′50″W, el. 3,855 feet (1,175 m)
- Powder Mills Ski Trail, 48°36′18″N 115°37′50″W, el. 3,855 feet (1,175 m)
- Power Dive Ski Trail, 48°36′18″N 115°37′50″W, el. 3,855 feet (1,175 m)
- Pulpit Mountain National Recreation Trail, 48°30′54″N 115°48′21″W, el. 5,627 feet (1,715 m)
- Ross Creek Pack Trail, 48°11′17″N 115°58′26″W, el. 3,425 feet (1,044 m)
- RunOut Ski Trail, 48°36′18″N 115°37′50″W, el. 3,855 feet (1,175 m)
- Seventh Heaven Ski Trail, 48°36′18″N 115°37′50″W, el. 3,855 feet (1,175 m)
- Silver Butte Trail, 47°56′01″N 115°32′04″W, el. 4,842 feet (1,476 m)
- Sipes Creek Trail, 48°10′07″N 115°10′16″W, el. 5,272 feet (1,607 m)
- Slimmer Creek Trail, 48°05′00″N 115°01′39″W, el. 5,905 feet (1,800 m)
- South Fork Ross Creek Trail, 48°11′43″N 115°57′04″W, el. 3,120 feet (950 m)
- Sun Dance Bowl Ski Trail, 48°36′18″N 115°37′50″W, el. 3,855 feet (1,175 m)
- Teeters Peak Trail, 48°04′41″N 115°29′49″W, el. 4,590 feet (1,400 m)
- Tepee Mountain Trail, 48°39′42″N 115°57′04″W, el. 5,512 feet (1,680 m)
- Upper Mambo Ski Trail, 48°36′18″N 115°37′50″W, el. 3,855 feet (1,175 m)

== See also ==
- List of trails of Montana
- Trails of Yellowstone National Park
