= List of trails of Madison County, Montana =

There are at least 121 named trails in Madison County, Montana according to the U.S. Geological Survey, Board of Geographic Names. A trail is defined as: "Route for passage from one point to another; does not include roads or highways (jeep trail, path, ski trail)."

- Ambush Meadows Ski Trail, 45°16′51″N 111°24′24″W, el. 7,759 feet (2,365 m)
- Ambush Ski Trail, 45°16′51″N 111°24′24″W, el. 7,759 feet (2,365 m)
- Arch Rock Ski Trail, 45°16′51″N 111°24′24″W, el. 7,759 feet (2,365 m)
- A-Z Chutes Ski Trail, 45°16′51″N 111°24′24″W, el. 7,759 feet (2,365 m)
- Bacon Rind Ski Trail, 45°16′51″N 111°24′24″W, el. 7,759 feet (2,365 m)
- Bad Dog Ski Trail, 45°16′51″N 111°24′24″W, el. 7,759 feet (2,365 m)
- Bavarian Forest Ski Trail, 45°16′51″N 111°24′24″W, el. 7,759 feet (2,365 m)
- Bert Road Ski Trail, 45°16′51″N 111°24′24″W, el. 7,759 feet (2,365 m)
- Big Couloir Ski Trail, 45°16′51″N 111°24′24″W, el. 7,759 feet (2,365 m)
- Big Horn Ski Trail, 45°16′51″N 111°24′24″W, el. 7,759 feet (2,365 m)
- Big Rock Tongue Ski Trail, 45°16′51″N 111°24′24″W, el. 7,759 feet (2,365 m)
- Billy Johns Trail, 45°42′26″N 112°23′56″W, el. 7,267 feet (2,215 m)
- Black and Blue Ski Trail, 45°16′51″N 111°24′24″W, el. 7,759 feet (2,365 m)
- Black Rock Gully Ski Trail, 45°16′51″N 111°24′24″W, el. 7,759 feet (2,365 m)
- Blue Moon Ski Trail, 45°16′51″N 111°24′24″W, el. 7,759 feet (2,365 m)
- Bone Crusher Ski Trail, 45°16′51″N 111°24′24″W, el. 7,759 feet (2,365 m)
- Bozeman Trail Ski Trail, 45°16′51″N 111°24′24″W, el. 7,759 feet (2,365 m)
- Brazil Pack Trail, 45°41′38″N 112°26′38″W, el. 7,208 feet (2,197 m)
- Broken Arrow Ski Trail, 45°16′51″N 111°24′24″W, el. 7,759 feet (2,365 m)
- Buffalo Jump Ski Trail, 45°16′51″N 111°24′24″W, el. 7,759 feet (2,365 m)
- Cache Trees Ski Trail, 45°16′51″N 111°24′24″W, el. 7,759 feet (2,365 m)
- Calamity Jane Ski Trail, 45°16′51″N 111°24′24″W, el. 7,759 feet (2,365 m)
- Chucks Run Ski Trail, 45°16′51″N 111°24′24″W, el. 7,759 feet (2,365 m)
- Country Club Ski Trail, 45°16′51″N 111°24′24″W, el. 7,759 feet (2,365 m)
- Cow Creek Trail, 45°29′23″N 112°05′11″W, el. 6,968 feet (2,124 m)
- Cow Flats Ski Trail, 45°16′51″N 111°24′24″W, el. 7,759 feet (2,365 m)
- Crazy Horse Ski Trail, 45°16′51″N 111°24′24″W, el. 7,759 feet (2,365 m)
- Crazy Raven Ski Trail, 45°16′51″N 111°24′24″W, el. 7,759 feet (2,365 m)
- Crons Pocket Ski Trail, 45°16′51″N 111°24′24″W, el. 7,759 feet (2,365 m)
- Cue Ball Ski Trail, 45°16′51″N 111°24′24″W, el. 7,759 feet (2,365 m)
- Currant Creek Trail, 45°28′37″N 112°02′16″W, el. 7,388 feet (2,252 m)
- Cutoff Trail, 44°58′03″N 111°22′44″W, el. 8,405 feet (2,562 m)
- Dakota Territory Ski Trail, 45°16′51″N 111°24′24″W, el. 7,759 feet (2,365 m)
- Dead Top Ski Trail, 45°16′51″N 111°24′24″W, el. 7,759 feet (2,365 m)
- Deep South Ski Trail, 45°16′51″N 111°24′24″W, el. 7,759 feet (2,365 m)
- Dictator Chutes Ski Trail, 45°16′51″N 111°24′24″W, el. 7,759 feet (2,365 m)
- Dirt Bag Wall Ski Trail, 45°16′51″N 111°24′24″W, el. 7,759 feet (2,365 m)
- Dry Fork Trail, 45°01′45″N 111°44′04″W, el. 6,722 feet (2,049 m)
- Duck Walk Ski Trail, 45°16′51″N 111°24′24″W, el. 7,759 feet (2,365 m)
- Dude Park Ski Trail, 45°16′51″N 111°24′24″W, el. 7,759 feet (2,365 m)
- El Dorado Ski Trail, 45°16′51″N 111°24′24″W, el. 7,759 feet (2,365 m)
- Elk Park Meadows Ski Trail, 45°16′51″N 111°24′24″W, el. 7,759 feet (2,365 m)
- Elk Park Ridge Ski Trail, 45°16′51″N 111°24′24″W, el. 7,759 feet (2,365 m)
- Exit Chute Ski Trail, 45°16′51″N 111°24′24″W, el. 7,759 feet (2,365 m)
- Fast Lane Ski Trail, 45°16′51″N 111°24′24″W, el. 7,759 feet (2,365 m)
- Fifth Gully Ski Trail, 45°16′51″N 111°24′24″W, el. 7,759 feet (2,365 m)
- First Gully Ski Trail, 45°16′51″N 111°24′24″W, el. 7,759 feet (2,365 m)
- Fourth Gully Ski Trail, 45°16′51″N 111°24′24″W, el. 7,759 feet (2,365 m)
- Gazelle Creek Pack Trail, 44°51′52″N 111°47′16″W, el. 9,055 feet (2,760 m)
- Gilbert Trail, 44°52′02″N 112°01′46″W, el. 7,329 feet (2,234 m)
- Gun Mount Ski Trail, 45°16′51″N 111°24′24″W, el. 7,759 feet (2,365 m)
- Hangmans Ski Trail, 45°16′51″N 111°24′24″W, el. 7,759 feet (2,365 m)
- High Clearing Ski Trail, 45°16′51″N 111°24′24″W, el. 7,759 feet (2,365 m)
- Highway Ski Trail, 45°16′51″N 111°24′24″W, el. 7,759 feet (2,365 m)
- Huntley Hollow Ski Trail, 45°16′51″N 111°24′24″W, el. 7,759 feet (2,365 m)
- Hyde Creek Trail, 44°58′30″N 111°47′12″W, el. 9,219 feet (2,810 m)
- Kurts Glades Ski Trail, 45°16′51″N 111°24′24″W, el. 7,759 feet (2,365 m)
- Larkspur Ski Trail, 45°16′51″N 111°24′24″W, el. 7,759 feet (2,365 m)
- Liberty Bowl Ski Trail, 45°16′51″N 111°24′24″W, el. 7,759 feet (2,365 m)
- Lightning Creek Trail, 44°59′32″N 111°22′43″W, el. 8,399 feet (2,560 m)
- Lightning Ski Trail, 45°16′51″N 111°24′24″W, el. 7,759 feet (2,365 m)
- Little Ewe Ski Trail, 45°16′51″N 111°24′24″W, el. 7,759 feet (2,365 m)
- Little Gullies Ski Trail, 45°16′51″N 111°24′24″W, el. 7,759 feet (2,365 m)
- Little Rock Tongue Ski Trail, 45°16′51″N 111°24′24″W, el. 7,759 feet (2,365 m)
- Little Tree Ski Trail, 45°16′51″N 111°24′24″W, el. 7,759 feet (2,365 m)
- Lobo Mesa Pack Trail, 44°49′09″N 111°48′09″W, el. 9,180 feet (2,800 m)
- Lobo Ski Trail, 45°16′51″N 111°24′24″W, el. 7,759 feet (2,365 m)
- Lone Wolf Ski Trail, 45°16′51″N 111°24′24″W, el. 7,759 feet (2,365 m)
- Lost Cabin Lake Recreation Trail, 45°35′36″N 112°04′10″W, el. 8,284 feet (2,525 m)
- Louise Lake National Recreation Trail, 45°36′24″N 112°02′36″W, el. 8,359 feet (2,548 m)
- Low Bench Ski Trail, 45°16′51″N 111°24′24″W, el. 7,759 feet (2,365 m)
- Low Clearing Ski Trail, 45°16′51″N 111°24′24″W, el. 7,759 feet (2,365 m)
- Lower Bone Crusher Ski Trail, 45°16′51″N 111°24′24″W, el. 7,759 feet (2,365 m)
- Lower Calamity Jane Ski Trail, 45°16′51″N 111°24′24″W, el. 7,759 feet (2,365 m)
- Lower Mister K Ski Trail, 45°16′51″N 111°24′24″W, el. 7,759 feet (2,365 m)
- Lower Morningstar Ski Trail, 45°16′51″N 111°24′24″W, el. 7,759 feet (2,365 m)
- Mad Wolf Ski Trail, 45°16′51″N 111°24′24″W, el. 7,759 feet (2,365 m)
- Madison Avenue Ski Trail, 45°16′51″N 111°24′24″W, el. 7,759 feet (2,365 m)
- Marmot Meadows Ski Trail, 45°16′51″N 111°24′24″W, el. 7,759 feet (2,365 m)
- Midnight Basin Ski Trail, 45°16′51″N 111°24′24″W, el. 7,759 feet (2,365 m)
- Mister K Ski Trail, 45°16′51″N 111°24′24″W, el. 7,759 feet (2,365 m)
- Moonlight Basin Ski Trail, 45°16′51″N 111°24′24″W, el. 7,759 feet (2,365 m)
- Nashville Bowl Ski Trail, 45°16′51″N 111°24′24″W, el. 7,759 feet (2,365 m)
- Never Sweat Ski Trail, 45°16′51″N 111°24′24″W, el. 7,759 feet (2,365 m)
- Old Faithful Glades Ski Trail, 45°16′51″N 111°24′24″W, el. 7,759 feet (2,365 m)
- Onslows Ski Trail, 45°16′51″N 111°24′24″W, el. 7,759 feet (2,365 m)
- Pacifer Ski Trail, 45°16′51″N 111°24′24″W, el. 7,759 feet (2,365 m)
- Pack Saddle Ski Trail, 45°16′51″N 111°24′24″W, el. 7,759 feet (2,365 m)
- Peacock Creek Trail, 45°28′29″N 112°04′37″W, el. 7,198 feet (2,194 m)
- Pedro Trail, 45°29′01″N 112°00′16″W, el. 7,910 feet (2,410 m)
- Ponderosa Ski Trail, 45°16′51″N 111°24′24″W, el. 7,759 feet (2,365 m)
- Powder River Ski Trail, 45°16′51″N 111°24′24″W, el. 7,759 feet (2,365 m)
- Quartz Hill Trail, 45°29′13″N 112°03′34″W, el. 7,730 feet (2,360 m)
- Rice Bowl Ski Trail, 45°16′51″N 111°24′24″W, el. 7,759 feet (2,365 m)
- Sacajawea Ski Trail, 45°16′51″N 111°24′24″W, el. 7,759 feet (2,365 m)
- Screaming Left Ski Trail, 45°16′51″N 111°24′24″W, el. 7,759 feet (2,365 m)
- Second Gully Ski Trail, 45°16′51″N 111°24′24″W, el. 7,759 feet (2,365 m)
- Seventeenth Green Ski Trail, 45°16′51″N 111°24′24″W, el. 7,759 feet (2,365 m)
- Short Shot Ski Trail, 45°16′51″N 111°24′24″W, el. 7,759 feet (2,365 m)
- Silverknife Ski Trail, 45°16′51″N 111°24′24″W, el. 7,759 feet (2,365 m)
- Sixth Gully Ski Trail, 45°16′51″N 111°24′24″W, el. 7,759 feet (2,365 m)
- Snake Bite Ski Trail, 45°16′51″N 111°24′24″W, el. 7,759 feet (2,365 m)
- Snake Pit Ski Trail, 45°16′51″N 111°24′24″W, el. 7,759 feet (2,365 m)
- Stump Farm Ski Trail, 45°16′51″N 111°24′24″W, el. 7,759 feet (2,365 m)
- Stutzmans Rock Ski Trail, 45°16′51″N 111°24′24″W, el. 7,759 feet (2,365 m)
- Sunlight Ski Trail, 45°16′51″N 111°24′24″W, el. 7,759 feet (2,365 m)
- The Bowl Ski Trail, 45°16′51″N 111°24′24″W, el. 7,759 feet (2,365 m)
- The Pinnacles Ski Trail, 45°16′51″N 111°24′24″W, el. 7,759 feet (2,365 m)
- The Wave Ski Trail, 45°16′51″N 111°24′24″W, el. 7,759 feet (2,365 m)
- Third Gully Ski Trail, 45°16′51″N 111°24′24″W, el. 7,759 feet (2,365 m)
- Thunder Ski Trail, 45°16′51″N 111°24′24″W, el. 7,759 feet (2,365 m)
- Tippys Tumble Ski Trail, 45°16′51″N 111°24′24″W, el. 7,759 feet (2,365 m)
- Tohelluride Ski Trail, 45°16′51″N 111°24′24″W, el. 7,759 feet (2,365 m)
- Turkey Traverse Ski Trail, 45°16′51″N 111°24′24″W, el. 7,759 feet (2,365 m)
- Upper Morningstar Ski Trail, 45°16′51″N 111°24′24″W, el. 7,759 feet (2,365 m)
- Upper Sunlight Ski Trail, 45°16′51″N 111°24′24″W, el. 7,759 feet (2,365 m)
- Vertical Reality Ski Trail, 45°16′51″N 111°24′24″W, el. 7,759 feet (2,365 m)
- War Dance Ski Trail, 45°16′51″N 111°24′24″W, el. 7,759 feet (2,365 m)
- White Wing Ski Trail, 45°16′51″N 111°24′24″W, el. 7,759 feet (2,365 m)
- Yellow Mule Ski Trail, 45°16′51″N 111°24′24″W, el. 7,759 feet (2,365 m)
- Zucchini Patch Ski Trail, 45°16′51″N 111°24′24″W, el. 7,759 feet (2,365 m)

== See also ==
- List of trails of Montana
- Trails of Yellowstone National Park
