= List of trails of Montana =

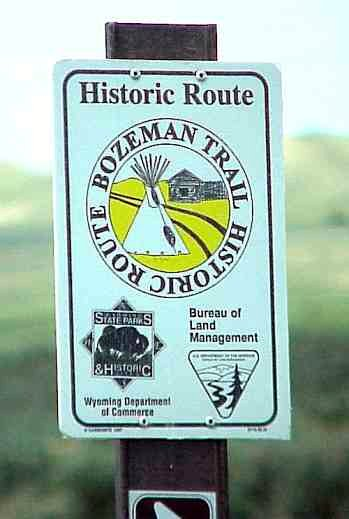
Bozeman Trail marker

There are at least 993 named trails in Montana according to the U.S. Geological Survey, Board of Geographic Names. A trail is defined as: "Route for passage from one point to another; does not include roads or highways (jeep trail, path, ski trail)."

- List of trails of Beaverhead County, Montana
- Big Horn County, Montana
  - Soldier Trail, 45°14′00″N 107°56′43″W, el. 4,455 feet (1,358 m)
  - Three Springs Trail, 45°11′23″N 107°54′23″W, el. 5,469 feet (1,667 m)
- Blaine County, Montana
  - Cow Island Trail, 47°57′47″N 109°09′44″W, el. 3,402 feet (1,037 m)
- Broadwater County, Montana
  - Divide Trail, 46°28′08″N 111°15′07″W, el. 8,576 feet (2,614 m)
  - Flathead Indian Trail, 46°17′25″N 111°12′18″W, el. 6,457 feet (1,968 m)
- List of trails of Carbon County, Montana
- Chouteau County, Montana
  - Hole in the Wall Trail, 47°48′51″N 110°03′24″W, el. 2,644 feet (806 m)
- Clearwater County, Idaho
  - Lolo Trail, 46°38′10″N 114°36′26″W, el. 6,424 feet (1,958 m)
  - State Line Trail (Montana), 46°43′55″N 114°38′59″W, el. 7,087 feet (2,160 m)
- Dawson County, Montana
  - Cap Rock Nature Trail, 47°03′08″N 104°40′48″W, el. 2,615 feet (797 m)
- Deer Lodge County, Montana
  - Long Canyon Trail, 46°02′11″N 112°53′59″W, el. 6,201 feet (1,890 m)
- Fergus County, Montana
  - Crystal Lake National Recreation Trail, 46°47′48″N 109°31′11″W, el. 6,227 feet (1,898 m)
  - Old Musselshell Trail, 47°30′19″N 108°23′42″W, el. 2,887 feet (880 m)
  - Skyline Trail, 47°32′11″N 108°21′40″W, el. 2,743 feet (836 m)
  - Wagon Wheel Trail, 47°41′45″N 109°42′02″W, el. 3,094 feet (943 m)
  - Wilder Trail, 47°34′21″N 108°26′38″W, el. 2,887 feet (880 m)
- List of trails of Flathead County, Montana
- List of trails of Gallatin County, Montana
- List of trails of Glacier County, Montana
- List of trails of Granite County, Montana
- Hill County, Montana
  - Mogul Alley Ski Trail, 48°10′40″N 109°38′03″W, el. 4,767 feet (1,453 m)
  - North Bowl Ski Trail, 48°10′40″N 109°38′03″W, el. 4,767 feet (1,453 m)
  - Screaming Eagle Ski Trail, 48°10′40″N 109°38′03″W, el. 4,767 feet (1,453 m)
  - Teacup Ski Trail, 48°10′40″N 109°38′03″W, el. 4,767 feet (1,453 m)
  - The Face Ski Trail, 48°10′40″N 109°38′03″W, el. 4,767 feet (1,453 m)
  - Towering Heights Ski Trail, 48°10′40″N 109°38′03″W, el. 4,767 feet (1,453 m)
- Jefferson County, Montana
  - Fetters Trail, 46°04′28″N 112°00′29″W, el. 6,719 feet (2,048 m)
  - Upper Whitetail Park Trail, 46°02′11″N 112°13′43″W, el. 6,434 feet (1,961 m)
- Lake County, Montana
  - Crow Creek Trail, 47°34′51″N 113°57′56″W, el. 4,800 feet (1,500 m)
  - Crow Creek Trail, 47°38′05″N 113°50′15″W, el. 3,917 feet (1,194 m)
  - Peterson Creek Trail, 48°02′31″N 113°53′15″W, el. 5,873 feet (1,790 m)
  - Wire Trail, 47°54′34″N 113°46′28″W, el. 5,807 feet (1,770 m)
- Lemhi County, Idaho
  - Divide Trail, 45°34′55″N 114°07′00″W, el. 7,677 feet (2,340 m)
- List of trails of Lewis and Clark County, Montana
- List of trails of Lincoln County, Montana
- List of trails of Madison County, Montana
- List of trails of Meagher County, Montana
- Mineral County, Montana
  - Cedar Creek Stock Driveway, 47°08′41″N 115°02′45″W, el. 5,741 feet (1,750 m)
  - Oriole Creek Trail, 46°47′15″N 114°37′14″W, el. 5,423 feet (1,653 m)
  - Storm Peak Trail, 47°23′13″N 115°28′20″W, el. 5,098 feet (1,554 m)
  - Trout Creek Stock Driveway, 47°06′29″N 114°57′25″W, el. 6,457 feet (1,968 m)
- List of trails of Missoula County, Montana
- List of trails of Park County, Montana
- Petroleum County, Montana
  - Horse Camp Trail, 47°30′23″N 108°18′16″W, el. 2,844 feet (867 m)
- Pondera County, Montana
  - North Badger-Elbow Creek Trail, 48°11′16″N 113°09′17″W, el. 5,909 feet (1,801 m)
- List of trails of Powell County, Montana
- Prairie County, Montana
  - Calypso Trail, 46°47′38″N 105°28′07″W, el. 2,434 feet (742 m)
- List of trails of Ravalli County, Montana
- Richland County, Montana
  - Lewis and Clark National Historic Trail, 48°07′35″N 104°51′17″W, el. 1,916 feet (584 m)
- List of trails of Sanders County, Montana
- Sweet Grass County, Montana
  - Black Butte Trail, 45°37′51″N 109°51′54″W, el. 5,643 feet (1,720 m)
  - Bozeman Trail, 45°39′30″N 109°42′43″W, el. 4,764 feet (1,452 m)
  - Lodgepole Trail, 45°33′01″N 109°57′58″W, el. 7,195 feet (2,193 m)
- Teton County, Montana
  - Jones Creek National Recreation Trail, 47°56′56″N 112°44′37″W, el. 5,833 feet (1,778 m)
  - Mortimer Gulch National Recreation Trail, 47°38′21″N 112°46′28″W, el. 5,712 feet (1,741 m)
  - South Fork Teton-Blacktail National Recreation Trail, 47°43′46″N 112°45′21″W, el. 6,165 feet (1,879 m)
  - West Fork Jones Creek National Recreation Trail, 47°56′33″N 112°45′32″W, el. 6,092 feet (1,857 m)
- Toole County, Montana
  - Bootlegger Trail, 48°14′11″N 111°19′09″W, el. 3,212 feet (979 m)
- Yellowstone County, Montana
  - Bill Bartley Trail, 45°43′56″N 108°49′50″W, el. 3,970 feet (1,210 m)
  - John Dunn Trail, 45°44′16″N 108°49′07″W, el. 3,674 feet (1,120 m)
