= Trout Lake (Wyoming) =

Lake in Park County, Wyoming, United States

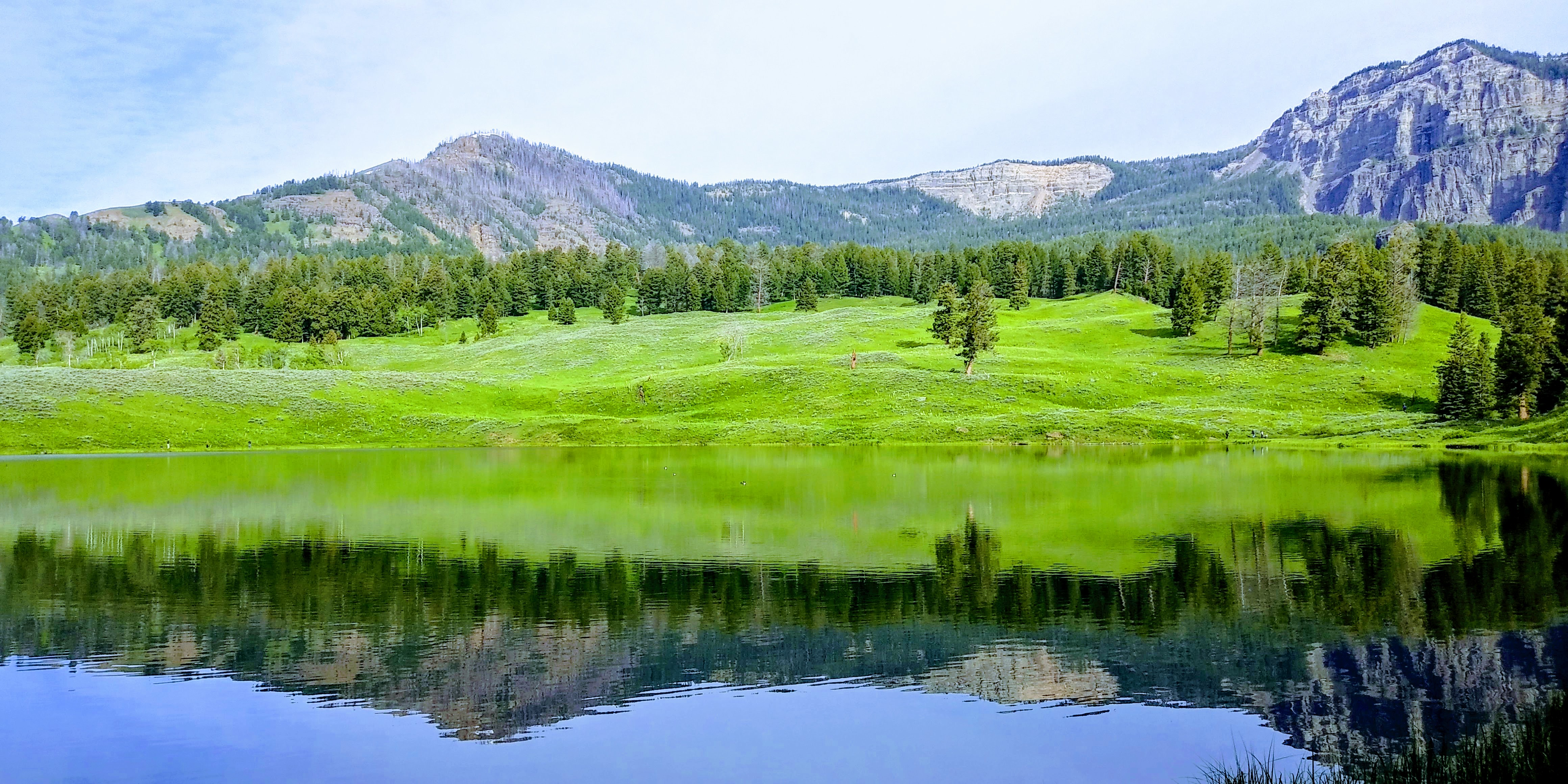
- Trout Lake, June 2019

- Location within Wyoming Location within the United States
- Location: Yellowstone National Park, Park County, Wyoming, US
- Coordinates: 44°54′02″N 110°07′50″W
- Basin countries: United States
- Max. length: 250 yards (0.23 km)
- Max. width: 250 yards (0.23 km)
- Surface area: 12 acres (0.049 km^{2})
- Surface elevation: 6,962 feet (2,122 m)

Trout Lake, formerly known as Fish Lake and Soda Butte Lake, is a 12 acres (0.049 km^{2}) popular backcountry lake for hikers and anglers in Yellowstone National Park. The lake is located approximately .33 miles (0.53 km) north of the Northeast Entrance Road near the confluence of Pebble Creek and Soda Butte Creek. The lake sits in a depression on a high bench above the Soda Butte Creek Canyon. A steep trail through a Douglas fir forest leads to the lake. The trailhead is located at: 44°53′57″N 110°7′21″W.

Trout Lake is a popular area for viewing North American river otter.

== Angling ==
Trout Lake is popular with anglers for its large (14-20") Yellowstone cutthroat trout and very large (20-30") rainbow trout and rainbow/cutthroat hybrids. The lake can be easily fished from the shoreline, but many anglers carry in float tubes to access the deeper parts of the lake. Using a float tube on Yellowstone lakes requires a park service boating permit. The lake opens for fishing on Memorial Day weekend. The inlet stream to the lake is permanently closed to protect spawning cutthroat trout. All cutthroat trout and hybrids caught in Trout Lake must be released.

Images of Trout Lake
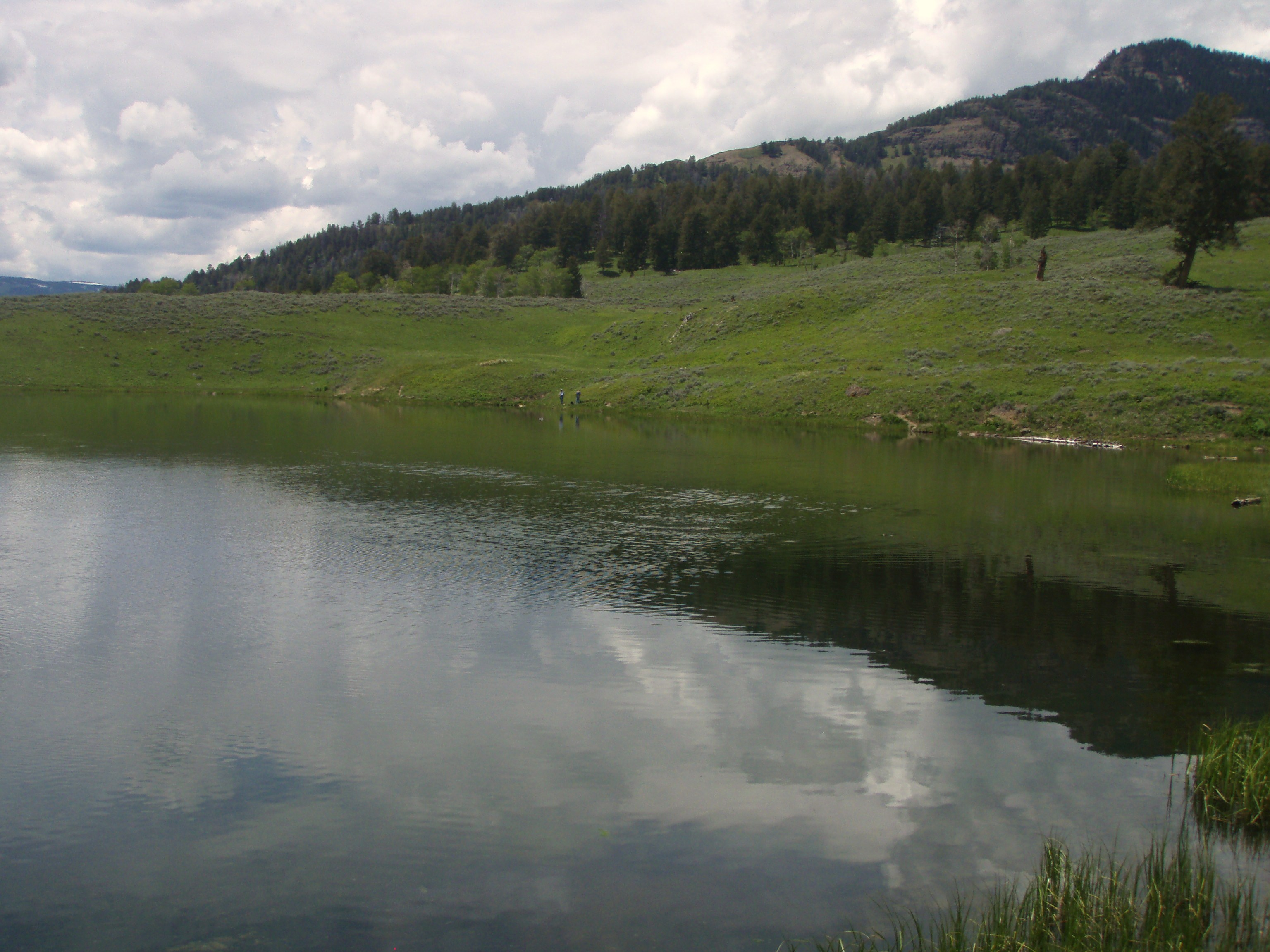
Trout Lake, 2009

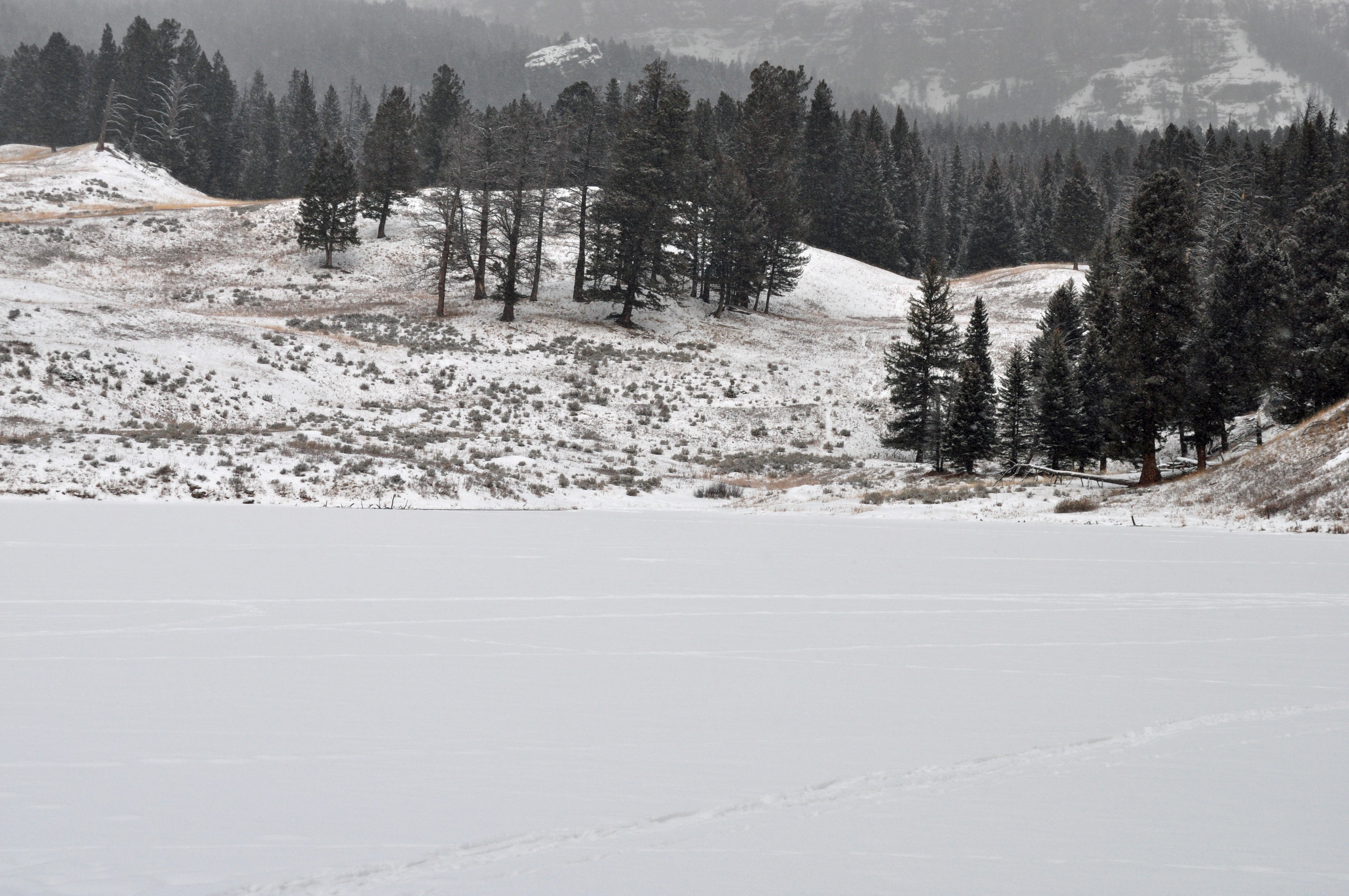
Winter 2009

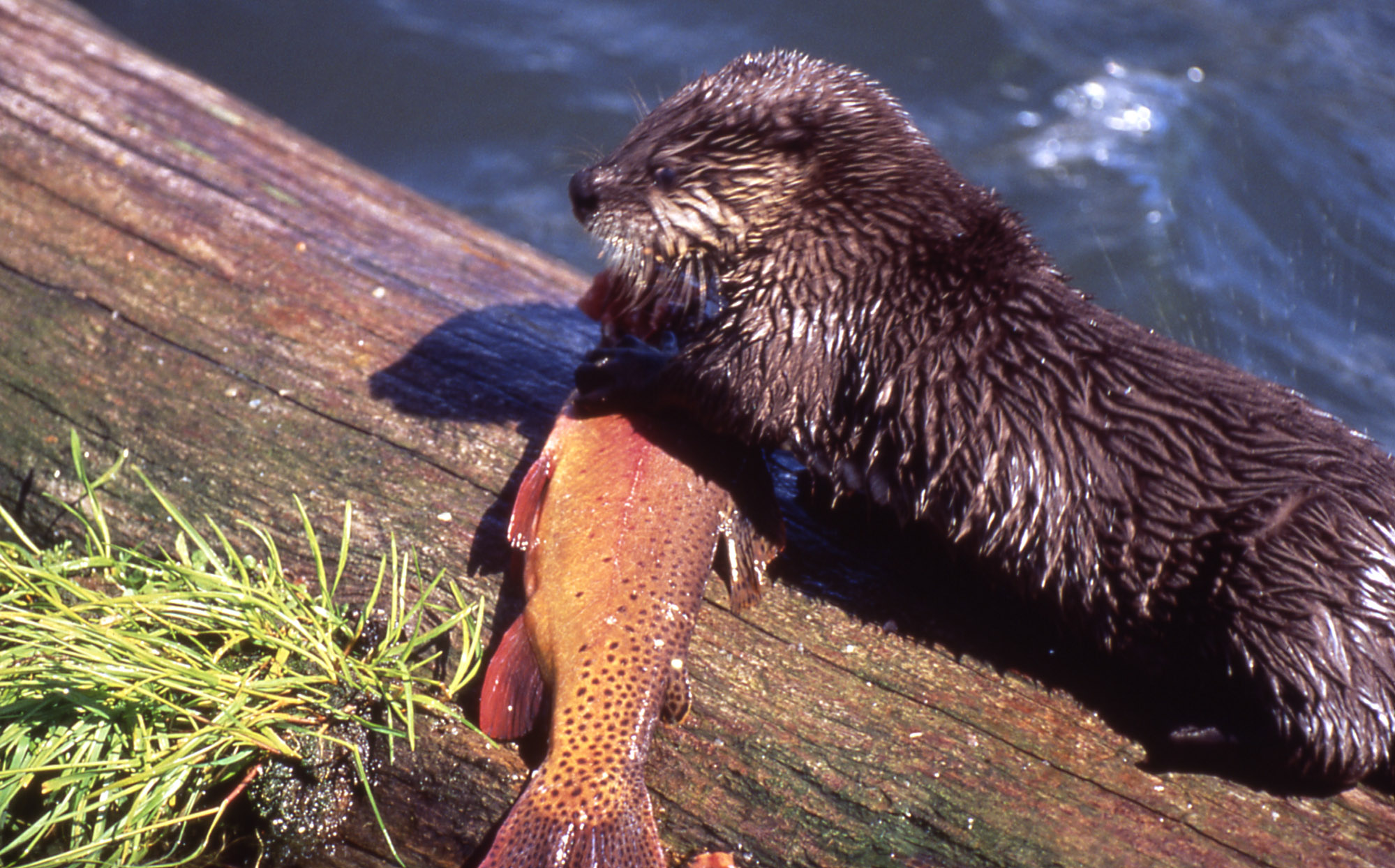
River Otter with Cutthroat Trout

== See also ==
- Angling in Yellowstone National Park
- Fishes of Yellowstone National Park
