= Trails of Yellowstone National Park =

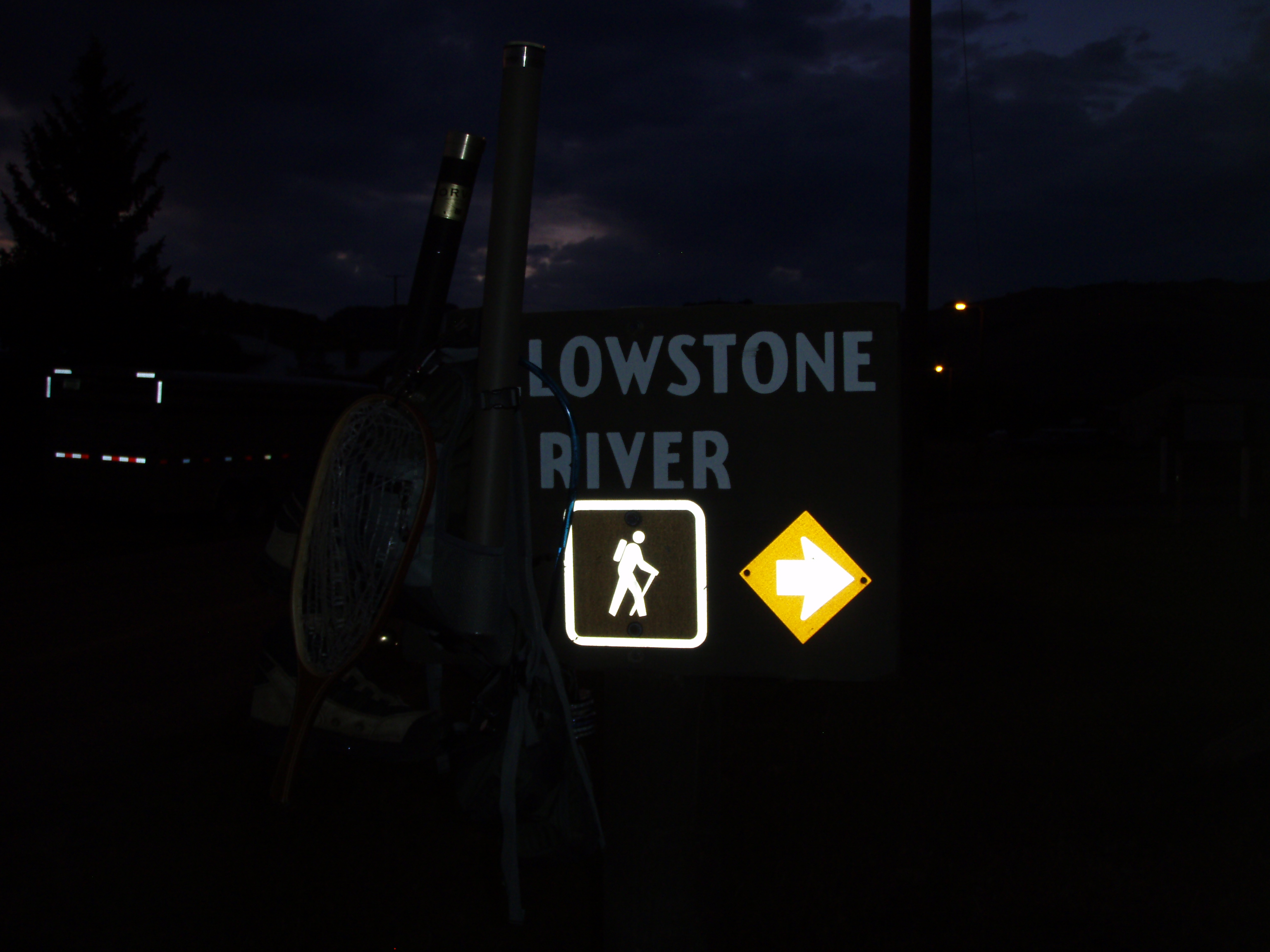
Yellowstone River trailhead at dawn

Yellowstone National Park has over 1,100 miles (1,800 km) of blazed and mapped hiking trails, including some that have been in use for hundreds of years. Several of these trails were the sites of historical events. Yellowstone's trails are noted for various geysers, hot springs, and other geothermal features, and for viewing of bald eagles, ospreys, grizzly bears, black bears, wolves, coyotes, bighorn sheep, pronghorns, and free-ranging herds of bison and elk.

== Prehistoric times ==
In the Middle Prehistoric era, humans appear to have continued living in mountain areas through droughts severe enough for plains populations to disappear. Evidence suggests that the Yellowstone Plateau was occupied continuously, with seasonal movement among preferred places. Foragers wintered in protected valleys along the edges of the plateau, and summered in higher hunting grounds that might have extended fifty to a hundred miles away. Some of the seasonal routes developed into often-used trails. Artifacts from this era are found throughout the park, with large enough concentrations around Yellowstone Lake to suggest a substantial population.

== Early 1800s ==
=== First white discoverer used Indian trail sections ===
John Colter (or Coulter), a former member of the Lewis and Clark Expedition, spent the winter of 1806-1807 trapping along the middle Yellowstone River. With the information he learned there, he was hired by the Missouri Fur Trading Company to invite Indian tribes to the trading post the company built at the mouth of the Big Horn River in October 1807. In the winter of 1807-1808, soliciting trade with the Crow and other native tribes, Colter traveled alone on a 500 miles (800 km) route that included the Yellowstone Plateau, making him the first white man to see Yellowstone Lake and some of the area's unique features. Colter's route included Indian trails both inside and outside the current park, such as over Pryor Gap near Cody, Wyoming; around the west shore of Yellowstone Lake and down Yellowstone River to the crossing near Tower Fall (a geothermal area on the east bank is "Hot Spring Brimstone" on Clark's map); and continuing up Lamar River and Soda Butte Creek and Clarks Fork to return to the Pryor Gap trail.

=== Bannock Trail ===
By 1840, bison (buffalo) had been hunted and trapped to extirpation west of the Continental Divide. The Shoshone and Bannock tribes had established a plains-style culture based on the buffalo on the Snake River plains, but the regional extirpation forced them to organize hunting migrations across the Yellowstone Plateau. These tribes established a route that became known as the Bannock Trail. The route began at Camas Meadows in Idaho, went over Targhee Pass, followed the Madison River basin, went over the Gallatin Mountains near Mount Holmes, down Indian Creek to the Gardner River, through Snow Pass to Mammoth Hot Springs, up Lava Creek, through the meadows of Blacktail Deer Creek, to the "Bannock Ford" crossing of the Yellowstone River near Tower Fall, up the Lamar Valley, and over the Absaroka Range into the Clarks Fork Valley. From there, Bannock and Shoshone (often with Flathead and Nez Perce) would choose between the Yellowstone Valley and the Wyoming Basin to hunt bison. For forty years ending in 1878 with the Bannock War, tribes used the Bannock Trail for access to drainages such as the Madison, Gallatin, Yellowstone, Stillwater, Clarks Fork, and Shoshone valleys, and through them to a more distant arc of buffalo ranges.

=== Folsom party used Indian trails ===
The most organized of the numerous explorations into Yellowstone in the 1860s was the 1869 Cook–Folsom–Peterson Expedition. It was particularly well documented as having traveled on existing Indian trails. From the Bozeman Pass area, the three-man group rode on a former Indian trail up Meadow Creek from the Gallatin drainage to the Yellowstone drainage, and down Trail Creek (named for its old trail) to the Yellowstone Valley, as miners had done since 1864. They followed Indian trails up the Yellowstone River the rest of the way south to the mouth of the Gardner River, where the trail forked. The party used the fork over Blacktail Deer Creek Plateau to the head of Rescue Creek. Portions of their later travels used other trails long used by natives. An article by Charles W. Cook and David E. Folsom describing the expedition was published in a Chicago magazine in 1870, raising popular attention. David Folsom worked with Walter W. deLacy, another explorer of Yellowstone, to revise deLacy's 1865 map; the 1870 edition aided that year's Washburn-Langford-Doane Expedition. They followed the same route into the area as far as Rescue Creek, then used the Bannock Trail eastward. Like the Folsom party, Washburn's group used other Indian trails around parts of Yellowstone Lake and elsewhere in the future Park.

== First years as a national park ==
Yellowstone's first superintendent, Nathaniel P. Langford, served without salary from 1872 to 1877. He also worked without funds, and entered the park only twice in his five years of service. Under Langford, no trails were developed, and existing trails were maintained only by their users and guides.

== Trail development by P.W. Norris ==
Yellowstone's second superintendent, Philetus W. Norris, served from 1877 to 1882. His administration, unlike Langford's, had a budget for roadbuilding and trailbuilding. In his five years, the park trail system was increased from 108 miles (174 km) to 204 miles (328 km), many miles of existing trails were improved into roads, and wooden signboards were added at many trail intersections and natural features.

Superintendent Norris added the trail (later a road) east through Lamar Valley and out the park's northeast corner, in 1878. He discovered, explored, and cleared a trail over the Washburn Range through Rowland Pass, in 1878.

In his final annual report, published in 1881, Norris listed five individual foot trails. This included the six-mile Terrace Mountain trail, a one mile path leading to Undine Falls (formerly called East Gardner Falls), a one mile trail that led to Monument Geyser Basin, and two short footpaths located in the Yellowstone Falls area. Since these trails were never mentioned in any of his previous reports, it’s assumed they were constructed during the 1880 season.

== Current trail system ==
Many trails in Yellowstone traverse Bear Management Areas and are seasonally closed or restricted to reduce human contact with bears.

=== Interpretive and attraction related trails ===
These trails are primarily associated with park attractions, especially geothermal features, and are sometimes out and back day hikes, and in many cases are improved boardwalks and supported with interpretive signs and exhibits.

Trail Name	Description	Trail Head(s)	Length (OW-One Way, RT-Round Trip)
Norris Geyser Basin Area
Artist Paint Pots	Interpretive trail that explores the Artist Paint Pots near Gibbon Meadows in the Norris Geyser Basin	3.9 miles (6.3 km) south of Norris Junction 44°41′37″N 110°44′45″W	1.2 miles (1.9 km)
Cygnet Lakes Trail	Relatively flat out and back trail to marshy lakes popular with wildlife observers.	6.6 miles (10.6 km) east of Norris Junction 44°42′21″N 110°34′21″W	8 miles (13 km)
Monument Geyser Basin	A moderately difficult out and back trail to the seldom visited Monument Geyser Basin	4.6 miles (7.4 km) south of Norris Junction 44°41′1″N 110°44′40″W	3 miles (4.8 km)
Mammoth Hot Springs Area
Boiling River Trail	Trail to hot springs on the edge of the Gardner River used as a swimming area.	North Entrance-Mammoth Road 44°59′32″N 110°41′31″W	1 mile (1.6 km)
Beaver Ponds Trail	Gentle loop trail through meadows and beaver ponds on Clematis Creek	Mammoth Hot Springs near Liberty Cap 44°58′30″N 110°42′33″W	5.1 miles (8.2 km)
Wraith Falls	Short hike to a 100 feet (30 m) cascade on Lupine Creek	Wraith Falls trailhead: 44°56′30″N 110°37′32″W	1 mile (1.6 km)
Madison River Area
Harlequin Lake	Trail to shallow lake just north of the West Entrance Rd near Madison Junction. Popular with birdwatchers.	1.7 miles west of Madison Junction 44°38′24″N 110°52′59″W	1 mile (1.6 km)
Purple Mountain Trail	Steep trail to the top of Purple Mountain el. 8,433 feet (2,570 m) with good views of the lower Gibbon River meadows.	.25 miles (0.40 km) nouth of Madison Junction 44°38′47″N 110°51′17″W	6 miles (9.7 km)
Lower and Midway Geyser Basin
Fountain Paint Pots Trail	An easy loop trail through the Fountain Paint Pots area at the southern end of the Lower Geyser Basin near Midway.	44°32′57″N 110°48′22″W	.5 miles (0.80 km)
Fountain Flats Freight Road	An old gravel road between Fountain Flats and Midway Geyser Basin closed in the 1970s. It is currently used as a bike path that gives access to several backcountry trailheads, Goose Lake and the Firehole River.	Northern trailhead: 44°34′1″N 110°50′6″W; Southern trailhead: 44°30′56″N 110°49′57″W	4.6 miles (7.4 km)
Upper Geyser Basin-Old Faithful Area
Upper Geyser Basin Trail	The Upper Geyser Basin trail is a series of long walkways that traverse the basin's thermal features between Old Faithful and Biscuit Basin. There are multiple loops and routes thru the basin using these trails.	Old Faithful trailhead:44°27′35″N 110°49′56″W; Biscuit Basin trailhead: 44°29′3″N 110°51′4″W	1.5 miles (2.4 km) to 5 miles (8.0 km)
Biscuit Basin Trail			
Black Sand Basin Trail			
Lone Star Geyser Basin Trail		Trailhead is 2.5 miles south of Old Faithful on Grand Loop Road 44°26′42″N 110°48′16″W	2.7 miles (4.3 km) OW
Mystic Falls Trail	Parallels the Little Firehole River to the base of the falls through burned over lodgepole pine and rocky talus.	Trailhead departs west side of Biscuit Basin loop. 44°29′8″N 110°51′31″W	1.2 miles (1.9 km) to base of falls. Connects with Biscuit Basin overlook trail, loop is ~2.4 miles (3.9 km) RT
Canyon Area
Uncle Tom's Trail	A steep 500 feet (150 m) descent into the Grand Canyon of the Yellowstone from the south rim near the Lower Yellowstone Fall.	Just east of the Lower Falls south rim parking area 44°42′59″N 110°29′37″W	1 mile (1.6 km)
West Thumb Geyser Basin
West Thumb Trail	An oval loop trail with an inner path that surrounds the major West Thumb geothermal features at the edge of Yellowstone Lake	Just east of West Thumb junction: 44°24′58″N 110°34′22″W	.5 miles (0.80 km)
Hayden Valley
Mud Volcano Trail	A loop trail that passes Mud Geyser, Black Dragon's Caldron, Grizzly Fumarole, Mud Volcano and other geothermal features.	6 miles (9.7 km) north of Fishing Bridge 44°37′27″N 110°25′59″W	.66 miles (1.06 km)
Lamar Valley
Trout Lake	Steep trail through fir forest to small alpine lake popular with anglers.	17 miles (27 km) east of Tower Junction: 44°53′56″N 110°7′22″W	.9 miles (1.4 km)
Yellowstone Lake Area
Pelican Creek Nature Trail		1.5 miles (2.4 km) east of Fishing Bridge:44°33′36″N 110°21′38″W	.5 miles (0.80 km)
Tower-Roosevelt Area
Lost Lake Trail	Easy loop trail to fishless Lost Lake	Behind Roosevelt Lodge:44°54′44″N 110°25′2″W	4 miles (6.4 km)
Tower Fall Trail	Easy walk to platform to view 132 feet (40 m) Tower Fall	2.5 miles (4.0 km) south of Tower Junction: 44°53′31″N 110°23′12″W	1 mile (1.6 km)
Yellowstone River Picnic Area Trail	Easy trail along the north rim of the Grand Canyon of the Yellowstone between Tower Fall and the Tower Junction bridge across the Yellowstone River. Connects with the Specimen Ridge trail.	2 miles (3.2 km) east of Tower Junction on Northeast entrance road. 44°55′0″N 110°24′1″W	1.2 miles (1.9 km)

=== Backcountry trails ===
These trails traverse the Yellowstone backcountry and many have backcountry campsites along their route.

Trail Name	Description	Trail Head(s)	Length (OW-One Way, RT-Round Trip)
Northwest Quadrant
Bighorn Pass Trail			
Blacktail Deer Creek Trail	Steep trail down to the Black Canyon of Yellowstone River		
Crevice Creek Trail			1.7 miles (2.7 km)
Fan Creek Trail			5 miles (8.0 km) to 11 miles (18 km)
Fawn Pass Trail			20.8 miles (33.5 km)
Gneiss Creek Trail			8.6 miles (13.8 km)
Grebe Lake Trail	Easy level trail through lodgepole pine forests to Grebe Lake, popular with anglers for its Arctic grayling	Approximately 4 miles (6.4 km) west of Canyon on the Canyon-Norris road. 44°43′2″N 110°32′58″W	6.6 miles (10.6 km) RT
Grizzly Lake Trail			
Ice Lake Trail			4.5 miles (7.2 km)
Lava Creek Trail		Western trailhead: 44°58′24″N 110°40′59″W; Eastern trailhead: 44°56′33″N 110°37′59″W	4.5 miles (7.2 km)
Mount Holmes Trail			
Rescue Creek Trail	Bounded on the north by the Yellowstone River and the south by Mount Everts	Northern trailhead: 45°1′3″N 110°41′37″W; Southern trailhead: 44°57′19″N 110°35′38″W	8.1 miles (13.0 km)
Solfatara Creek Trail			6.3 miles (10.1 km)
Sportsman Lake Trail			23.2 miles (37.3 km)
Trilobite Lake Trail			
Wolf Lake Trail			4.7 miles (7.6 km)
Yellowstone River Trail-Black Canyon	Trail parallels the North shore of the Yellowstone River from Gardiner to Tower Junction in the Black Canyon of the Yellowstone.	Western trailhead Gardiner, MT: 45°1′55″N 110°42′6″W; Eastern trailhead (Tower Junction): 44°54′57″N 110°24′56″W	18.5 miles (29.8 km)
Northeast Quadrant
Buffalo Fork Trail			
Cache Creek Trail			5.6 miles (9.0 km)
Coyote Creek Trail			8.7 miles (14.0 km)
Hellroaring Creek Trail			4 miles (6.4 km)
Pebble Creek Trail			12 miles (19 km)
Slough Creek Trail			22 miles (35 km)
Specimen Ridge Trail			18.8 miles (30.3 km)
Yellowstone River Picnic Trail	Trail parallels the north rim of the Grand Canyon of the Yellowstone which has views of the river and canyon. Intersects with the Specimen Ridge trail at 1.9 miles (3.1 km).	Trailhead 1.8 miles (2.9 km) east of Tower-Roosevelt on Northeast Entrance road. 44°55′0″N 110°24′1″W	3.8 miles (6.1 km) RT
Southwest Quadrant
Delacy Creek Trail	An easy, well marked trail that follows the course of DeLacy Creek to the north shore of Shoshone Lake.	.9 miles (1.4 km) east of Craig Pass on the Grand Loop Road 44°26′49″N 110°42′8″W	5.8 miles (9.3 km) RT
Divide Trail	Steep out and back trail from the Craig Pass area to Divide Mountain el. 8,725 feet (2,659 m) (site of a former fire lookout tower) for great views of the Shoshone Lake basin.	6.8 miles (10.9 km) east of Old Faithful: 44°26′5″N 110°44′5″W	5 miles (8.0 km)
Dogshead Trail			4.6 miles (7.4 km)
Fairy Creek Trail			
Lewis Channel Trail			6.2 miles (10.0 km)
Mary Mountain Trail	Wildlife rich trail that traverses Mary Mountain el. 8,573 feet (2,613 m) between Alum Creek in the Hayden Valley and Nez Perce Creek on the Firehole River.	Nez Perce Creek trailhead: 44°34′11″N 110°48′58″W; Alum Creek trailhead: 44°40′59″N 110°29′37″W	20 miles (32 km)
Mallard Creek Trail	An alternate route to Mallard Lake. A popular winter cross-country skiing trail.	4.8 miles (7.7 km) north of Old Faithful: 44°30′24″N 110°50′0″W	4.2 miles (6.8 km)
Mallard Lake Trail	A moderate hike to Mallard Lake from the Old Faithful area. A popular winter cross-country skiing trail.	Old Faithful trailhead: 44°27′29″N 110°47′22″W	3.1 miles (5.0 km)
Shoshone Lake Trail	A long, backcountry trail to the southwest shore of Shoshone Lake and the Shoshone Geyser Basin.	Lewis Falls trailhead: 44°19′30″N 110°44′57″W; Old Faithful trailhead: 44°23′53″N 110°49′40″W	16.9 miles (27.2 km)
Summit Lake Trail	A difficult backcountry trail from Biscuit Basin to the western border of the park. The trail makes up a significant portion of the Continental Divide Trail contained in the park.	Biscuit Basin trailhead:44°29′3″N 110°51′4″W; Western trailhead: 44°24′28″N 111°5′50″W	15.9 miles (25.6 km)
Southeast Quadrant
Heart Lake Trail	A moderate hike through meadows and forests to Heart Lake and the Heart Lake Geyser Basin. Popular with anglers for Yellowstone cutthroat trout and lake trout. Connects with the Mount Sheridan Trail at the lake.	Northern trailhead is opposite Lewis Lake on the southern entrance road. 44°19′0″N 110°35′57″W; Southern trailhead spurs off the South Boundary Trail near Snake Hot Springs 44°10′9″N 110°34′27″W	7.5 miles (12.1 km) OW (from Lewis Lake)
Mount Sheridan Trail	Steep trail to the summit of Mount Sheridan overlooking Heart Lake.	Northwest shoreline of Heart Lake 44°16′45″N 110°30′11″W	6.6 miles (10.6 km) RT (from Heart Lake)
