= Gerard Baker (ranger) =

American National Park Service ranger

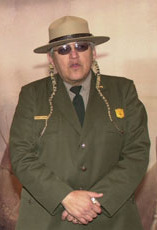
- Born: December 2, 1953 (age 72); Fort Berthold Indian Reservation
- Known for: Superintendent of Lewis and Clark National Historic Trail, Chickasaw National Recreation Area, Little Bighorn Battlefield National Monument, Mount Rushmore
- Spouse: Mary Kay Baker
- Children: 4
- Awards: Honor Award for Superior Service

Gerard Baker (born December 2, 1953) is an American retired National Park Service (NPS) ranger. In his more than 30 years with the NPS, he served as the superintendent of Lewis and Clark National Historic Trail, Chickasaw National Recreation Area, Little Bighorn Battlefield National Monument, and Mount Rushmore. A registered member of the Three Affiliated Tribes and the highest ranking Native American in the history of the NPS, Baker incorporated Native American perspectives at Mount Rushmore and headed the Corps of Discovery II project to commemorate the Lewis and Clark Expedition. His tenure at Little Big Horn was marked by conflicts with admirers of George Armstrong Custer.

== Early life and education ==
Baker was born and raised on Fort Berthold Indian Reservation in North Dakota. He has two brothers and a sister. His mother was Hidatsa, and his father, Paige Baker Sr., was Mandan and Hidatsa; Baker speaks the Hidatsa language. His Hidatsa language name is Zaa-sha-shee-dish (Yellow Wolf). He is a registered member of the Three Affiliated Tribes. Baker and his siblings grew up working on the family ranch.

He graduated from St. Mary's High School in New England, North Dakota. Attending Southern Oregon State University on a basketball scholarship, Baker earned a bachelor's degree in criminal justice and sociology in 1979. The South Dakota School of Mines and Technology awarded Baker an honorary doctorate in public service in 2007.

== Career ==
Baker began working for the National Park Service as a seasonal employee at Theodore Roosevelt National Park, becoming full-time in 1979. His early duties in the park service as a seasonal employee were doing maintenance. As a new park ranger, Baker replaced the ranger band on his hat with an Indian-beaded band to the consternation of his supervisor. Some of his posts included Knife River Indian Villages, Fort Union Trading Post, Little Missouri National Grasslands, and the Beartooth and Ashland districts of Montana. From 1984 to 1993, Baker worked for the United States Forest Service as an assistant district ranger and American Indian program manager for the Ashland Montana District.

In 1993, Baker became the second Native American superintendent of Little Bighorn Battlefield National Monument (succeeding the first Native American superintendent, Barbara Sutteer). The previous superintendent had begun the process of changing the monument's name, Custer Battlefield National Monument. When the name change was enacted during Baker's tenure, he received "angry letters, a petition for removal, and seven confirmed death threats". During the 120th anniversary ceremonies at Little Bighorn in 1996, Lakota tribe members performed a victory dance and touched the monument marking the 7th Cavalry Regiment mass grave to symbolize counting coup. Fans of George Armstrong Custer claimed that Baker was "Indianizing" Little Bighorn and accused him of allowing the descration of the grave.

Baker added Indian interpreters to the park's interpretative program to balance the stories told to park visitors, and encouraged more Native American visitors with personal invitations to neighboring tribes for the battle's anniversary. From 1995 on, representatives from each tribe that had participated in the battle were involved in the annual ceremonies. Baker said:

And I knew that I had accomplished something when I stood in my window, we had a buffalo feed, and here were people sitting on the ground around the Little Bighorn―battlefield over here, national cemetery over there―side-by-side; white, red, white, red. Indians, whites―all sitting side-by-side, laughing and eating their buffalo.

In 1998, Baker became superintendent of Chickasaw National Recreation Area and received the Honor Award for Superior Service from the Interior Department.

Baker was appointed superintendent of Corps of Discovery II in 2000, a project to create a mobile multi-media education center that recounts the journey of Lewis and Clark. Corps of Discovery II launched at Monticello in January 2003. Baker coordinated project involvement with more than 68 tribes across the country.

On June 25, 2003, Baker and other former superintendents who had worked for establishment of the Indian Memorial hosted the dedication ceremonies at Little Big Horn.

In 2004, Baker was appointed superintendent of Mount Rushmore, the first Native American to hold that position. As superintendent, Baker promoted Native American education programs and added interpretive displays to incorporate the perspectives of the tribes. He created the Heritage Village exhibit featuring tipis to represent the Lakota, Dakota, and Nakota nations. The exhibits and Indian speakers that Baker added became some of Mount Rushmore's most popular features with the public, however there was local criticism that his additions did not belong and that he was imposing his "personal values". Discussing the criticism, Baker said:

We have stories that are very hard to tell; we have stories that are very hard to listen to. Primarily, the reactions have been very positive but there are always those few that condemn; they didn’t want to hear about the American Indian plight, or they don’t want to hear about the breaking of treaties. Because it happened a long time ago, it doesn’t affect us today. And I believe it still affects us today.

At Mount Rushmore, Baker worked on modifying forest management policies to address a pine beetle infestation. After Greenpeace members scaled Mount Rushmore and displayed a protest banner in 2009, Baker stated that the security system had worked as designed, but received criticism from the public when an investigation found that some parts of the monument's security system were inoperable.

In 2007, the beginning of the filming of National Treasure: Book of Secrets was marked by the performance of a smudging ceremony by Baker. He made several appearances in Ken Burns's 2009 documentary series, The National Parks: America's Best Idea.

In April 2010, Baker was appointed the assistant park service director for Native American relations, but retired from the National Park Service nearly three months later due to health concerns, having had a stroke while at Mount Rushmore.

In 2012, Baker became the executive director of the Oglala Sioux Parks and Recreation Authority.

Baker appeared in the 2023 Ken Burns documentary The American Buffalo.

== Family ==
Baker and his wife, Mary Kay, have four children. His brother Paige also worked for the NPS and was superintendent of Badlands National Park.

== See also ==
- Shelton Johnson
