= West Thumb =

West Thumb may refer to the following features in Yellowstone National Park:

- The most western portion of Yellowstone Lake formed by a volcanic eruption 174,000 years ago
- West Thumb Geyser Basin, a thermal area on the shores of that portion of Yellowstone Lake
- West Thumb Junction, used to refer to the general area of the park, often used interchangeably with nearby Grant Village
