= Mission 66 =

Program to dramatically expand National Park Service visitor services

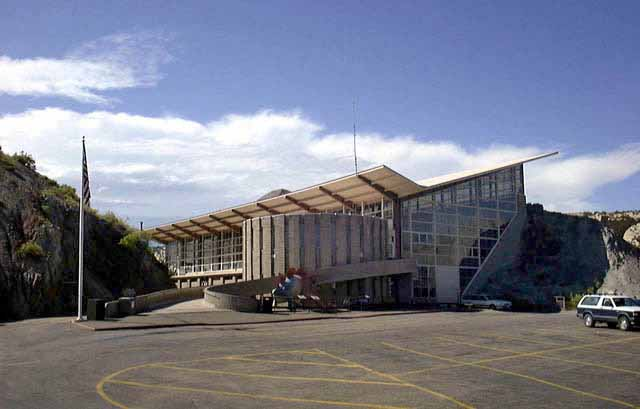
Dinosaur Quarry Visitor Center at Dinosaur National Monument, prior to 2009

Mission 66 was a United States National Park Service ten-year program that was intended to dramatically expand Park Service visitor services by 1966, in time for the 50th anniversary of the establishment of the Park Service.

When the National Park Service was created in 1916, long-distance travel in North America was typically accomplished by train. There was no national road system, and airline travel was in its infancy. Railroads were closely involved in the development of visitor services at such parks as Grand Canyon National Park, Glacier National Park and Yellowstone National Park, and in many cases the railroads built and operated park visitor facilities.

With the development of the US highway system as a public works project during the Great Depression, many previously remote parks became accessible via good roads and inexpensive automobiles. The explosion in prosperity following World War II brought a tide of automobile-borne tourists that the parks were ill-equipped to receive. By the mid-1950s it was apparent that massive investment in park infrastructure was required. Mission 66 was conceived as the means to accommodate increased visitor numbers and to provide high-quality interpretation services.

While Mission 66 involved a variety of infrastructure projects such as roads, utilities and employee housing, the most visible components were interpretive facilities and visitor centers. Visitor centers were often the first point of contact between the Park Service and visitors, and the Park Service put considerable emphasis on the appropriate orientation and learning opportunities that visitor centers could provide.

First Day cover of 50th Anniversary of National Park Service commemorative stamp

== Origin ==
During the late 1940s and early 1950s, the Park Service came under increasing criticism for neglect of the park system. An essay by Bernard DeVoto in Harper's Magazine proposed that the national parks should be closed until they were funded appropriately. While this had little immediate effect, it highlighted an increasing level of concern about the state and future direction of the park system. In 1955, Park Service Director Conrad Wirth proposed a decade-long program of capital improvement, to be funded as a single program by Congress. The expressed aim was to complete the upgrades in time for the Park Service's 50th anniversary in 1966.

== Visitor facilities ==
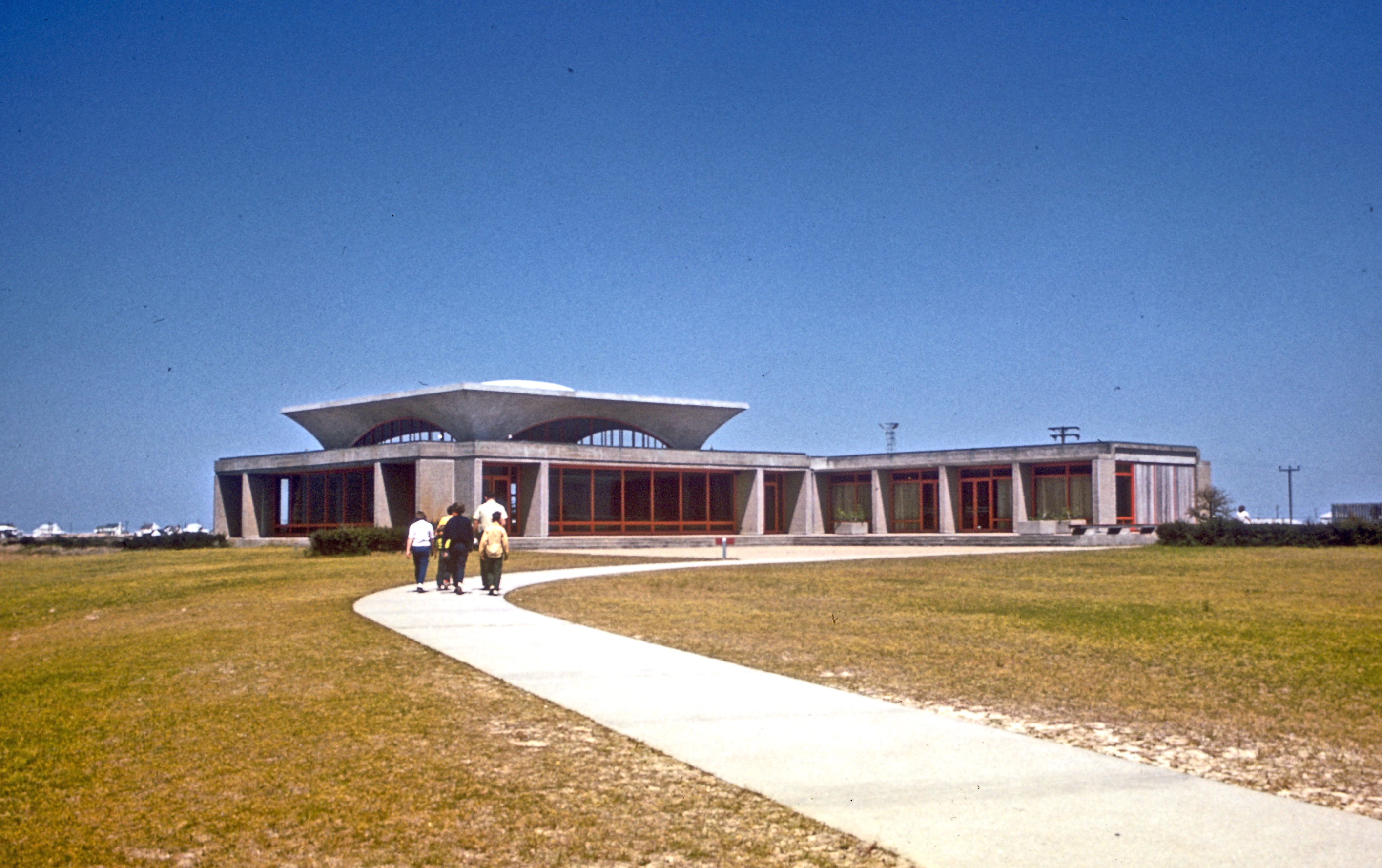
Wright Brothers National Memorial visitor center, shortly after completion

In early parks, visitor orientation facilities were built on a relatively small scale, often in the form of "trailside museums" for visitor edification. With the development of the visitor center concept, the visitor center was to be the main point of contact between the Park Service and visitors, providing orientation, education, toilets, concessions, public safety and administrative services in one location. As a new feature, visitor centers had to be built quickly and in quantity. The National Park Service Rustic style that had previously been popular was suitable for the 1930s, when cheap and plentiful Civilian Conservation Corps labor was available, but was not practical on a large scale in a time of full employment. Managers such as Thomas Chalmers Vint, the Park Service director of design and construction, made a conscious decision to employ a more streamlined modern style of design for Mission 66 facilities. The simpler, cleaner design philosophy was faster and less expensive to implement, and this design aesthetic fit with the idea of a "new era" in park services.

Mission 66 also involved substantial re-planning of entire park infrastructures, with entirely new developments reaching the proportions of new towns. Grant Village and Canyon Village, together with the never-built Firehole Village were intended to diminish the impact of visitor accommodations on sensitive areas close to park attractions in Yellowstone National Park, respectively replacing heavy development at West Thumb Geyser Basin, the Canyon Hotel, and the Old Faithful Inn and Lodge. The similar Wuksachi Village in Sequoia National Park was planned to replace the Giant Forest and Camp Kaweah developments. Colter Bay Village in Grand Teton National Park included the relocation of cabins from guest ranches displaced by the expansion of the park into Jackson Hole.

Mission 66 drew criticism from preservationists and conservationists for emphasizing construction and development in national parks. Hastening the advent of the modern environmental movement, it transformed the Sierra Club from a regional mountaineering club into a national advocacy organization.

=== Housing ===
While a large portion of the funding for Mission 66 was devoted to visitor facilities, attention was also given to employee housing. Much of the existing housing was built by the CCC and amounted to little more than cabins. Using the model of postwar military housing, a series of standard designs was developed, focusing on the ranch style detached housing popular at the time.

== Park development versus preservation ==
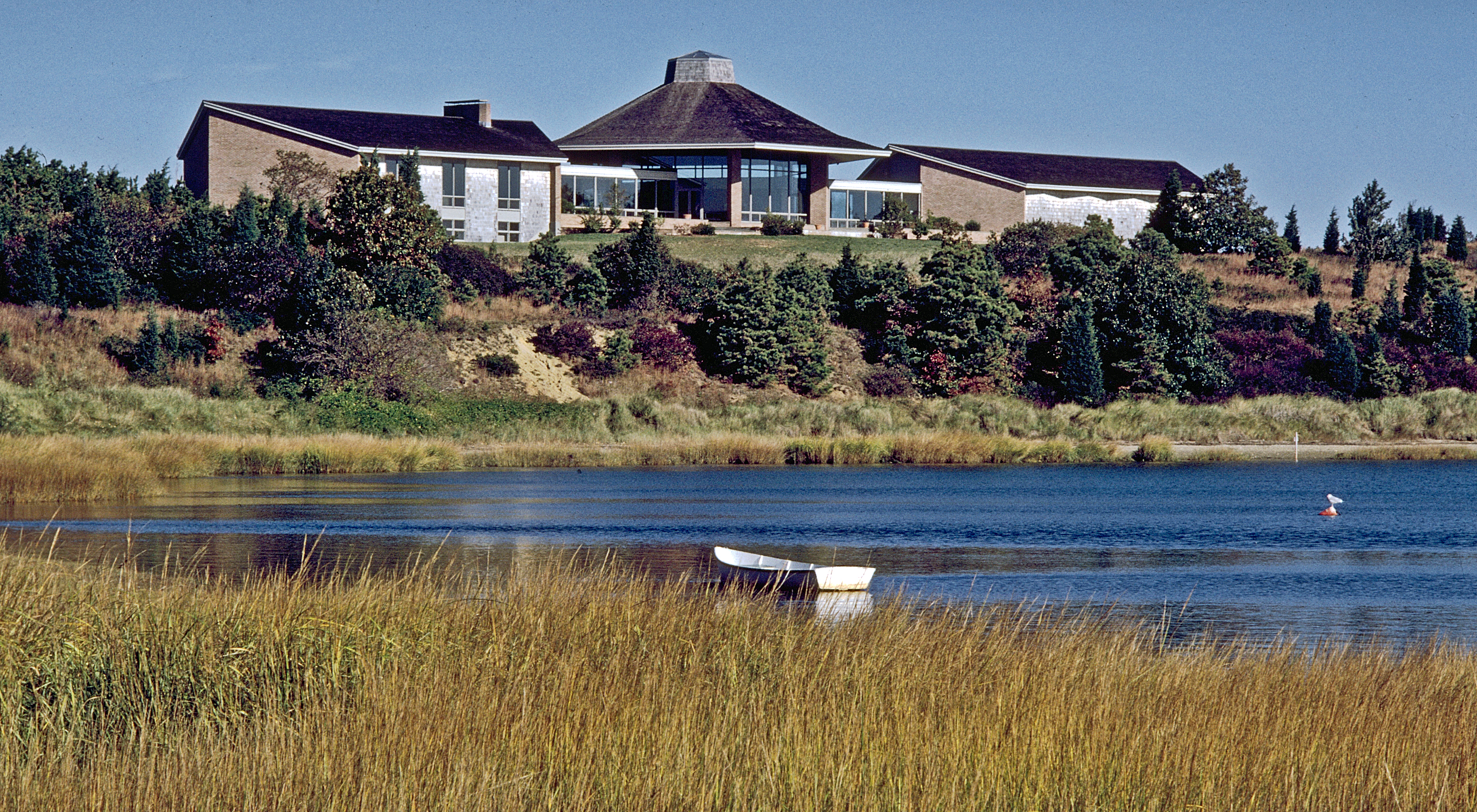
Salt Pond Visitor Center, Cape Cod National Seashore

While most Mission 66 projects were intended for infrastructure improvements and visitor services in natural areas, some urban projects involved the creation of entirely new attractions at the expense of urban landscapes. The Gateway Arch National Park (then known as the Jefferson National Expansion Memorial) on the St. Louis, Missouri riverfront entailed the demolition of forty blocks of the city to create a new urban park at the feet of Gateway Arch. The old warehouse district had been targeted for demolition by the city to eradicate "urban blight", and the arch and its park were seen as a means to this end, which had been pursued since the 1930s. Ironically, much of the exploration and expansion the new project commemorated had originated from the demolished riverfront district.

In Philadelphia, the development of Independence National Historical Park involved the creation of Independence Mall. The mall was designed to provide a vista of Independence Hall, necessitating the demolition of numerous 19th-century buildings.

== Programs ==
While Mission 66 is most frequently associated with physical improvements, it also funded a number of continuing programs. The Historic American Buildings Survey, which had been inactive since 1941, was re-funded. The former Historic Sites Survey was reorganized into National Historic Landmarks and National Register of Historic Places programs in 1960, under Mission 66 funding.

=== System expansion ===
While most aspects of Mission 66 involved improvements to existing Park Service units, there was also a movement to expand the system to encompass active recreational use. In particular, the National Seashore and National Recreation Area programs were expanded as major portions of the twenty-seven units added from 1955 to 1963. Cape Cod, Point Reyes, Fire Island and Padre Island were all incorporated into the system under Mission 66.

At the same time, a number of National Recreation areas were developed in conjunction with Bureau of Reclamation projects, including Glen Canyon and Flaming Gorge, both built around new dam projects.

== Preservation and controversy ==
Fifty years later, as many Mission 66 facilities themselves aged and required repairs and modernization, controversy erupted over their suitability for the Park Service mission and their impact on historic and natural sites. Modernism had fallen from favor with the general public, and some facilities were considered intrusive. Two of the most notable examples were the now-demolished Cyclorama Building at Gettysburg National Military Park by Richard Neutra and the Henry M. Jackson Visitor Center by Whimberley, Whisenand, Allison & Tong at Mount Rainier National Park.

The following list highlights some of the most significant facilities.

=== Extant ===
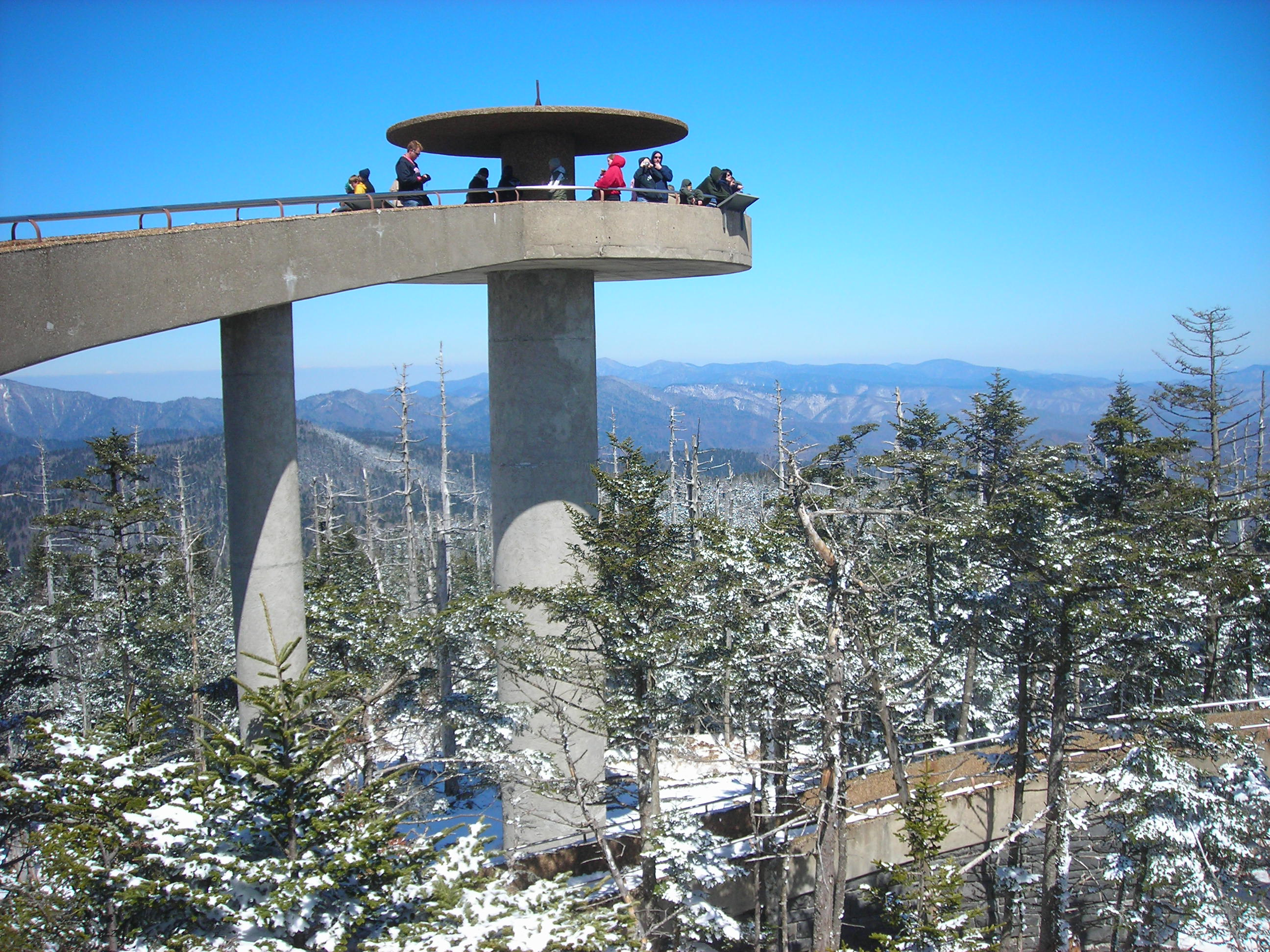
Kuwohi observation tower

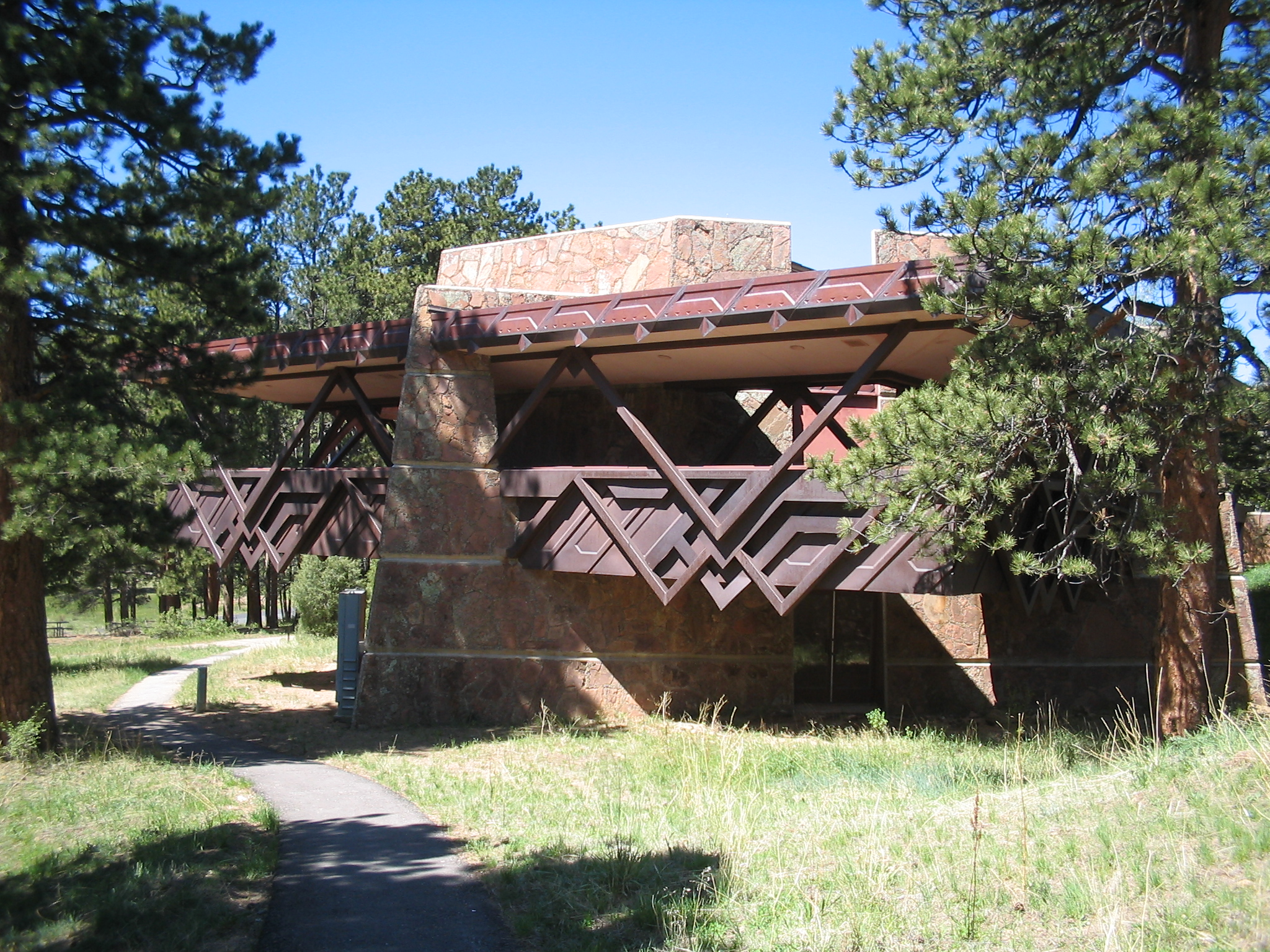
Beaver Meadows Visitor Center, Rocky Mountain National Park

- Everglades National Park Shark Valley Observation Tower
- Everglades National Park Flamingo Visitor Center
- Badlands National Park Visitor Center, Cecil Doty and Lucas, Craig, Whitwam (Rapid City), 1957-1958
- Grand Teton National Park

- Colter Bay visitor center, Malone & Hooper, San Francisco and the Western Office of Design and Construction, 1956-1957
- Jackson Lake Lodge, Gilbert Stanley Underwood, 1955
- Moose visitor center, Spencer, Ambrose and Lee, San Francisco and the Western Office of Design and Construction, 1957-1958, now functioning as the park administration building since its replacement with a new visitor center.

- Great Smoky Mountains National Park

- Sugarlands visitor center, Eastern Office of Design and Construction, 1957-1958
- Kuwohi observation tower

- Little Bighorn Battlefield National Monument visitor center, Max R. Garcia, San Francisco, 1964–1965
- Mesa Verde National Park Far View visitor center, WODC, Joseph & Louise Marlowe, Denver, 1964-1968.
- Hopewell Furnace National Historic Site Visitor Center, Maintenance Building, Housing. Eastern Office of Design and Construction, 1957-1958.
- Chickasaw National Recreation Area Travertine Nature Center. MacKie and Kamrath (Houston), 1969.
- Petrified Forest National Park, Painted Desert Community Complex, Neutra and Alexander, Los Angeles, 1959-1963
- Rocky Mountain National Park, Beaver Meadows Visitor Center/Headquarters, Taliesin Associated Architects, 1967, (National Historic Landmark)
- Wright Brothers National Memorial, visitor center, Mitchell/Giurgola, 1957-1959 (National Historic Landmark)
- Zion National Park, Oak Creek visitor center, WODC, Cecil Doty, Cannon and Mullen, Salt Lake City, 1957-1961

=== Endangered ===
- Antietam National Battlefield visitor center, William Cramp Scheetz Jr., Philadelphia and the Eastern Office of Design and Construction, 1961-62
- Cape Cod National Seashore, Salt Pond Visitor Center, EODC/Biderman, 1964-65

=== Demolished or extensively altered ===
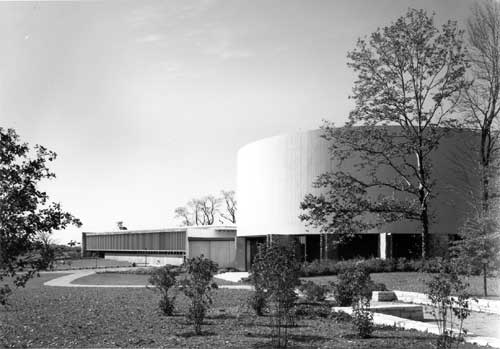
Gettysburg Cyclorama

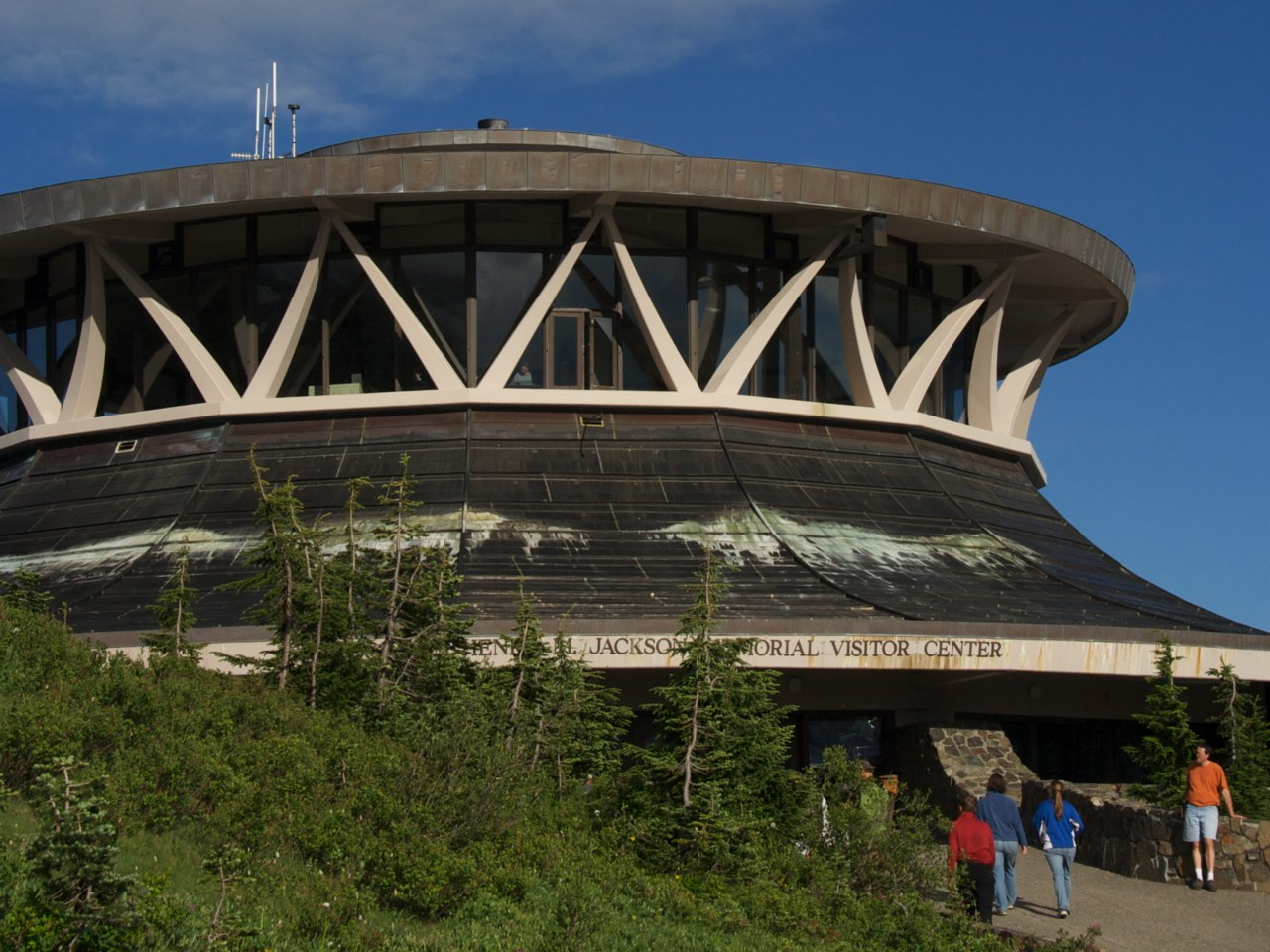
Old Henry M. Jackson Visitor Center, Mount Rainier National Park

- Cyclorama Building at Gettysburg National Military Park, Neutra and Alexander, Los Angeles, 1958–62; at one time under consideration for National Historic Landmark status, but demolished in March 2013.
- Dinosaur National Monument, Quarry Visitor Center, Anshen & Allen, San Francisco, 1957 (National Historic Landmark). The Visitor Center was closed in July 2006 after inspection revealed serious structural issues arising from soil movement. Substantial portions of the existing structure are to be demolished and replaced with a new structure. The exhibit hall with its butterfly roof is to be stabilized and renovated. Work began in March 2010.
- Mount Rushmore National Memorial visitor center, Harold Spitznagel & Associates, Sioux Falls and the Western Office of Design and Construction, 1957–63, demolished 1994
- Yellowstone National Park, Old Faithful visitor center, San Francisco Planning and Service Center, 1968-70 - demolished
- Mount Rainier National Park, Henry M. Jackson Memorial Visitor Center, Whimberley, Whisenand, Allison & Tong, Honolulu, with McGuire & Muri, Tacoma, Washington, 1964–67, demolished 2009.

== Road projects ==
Completion of the Blue Ridge Parkway, Foothills Parkway, Natchez Trace Parkway and Colonial Parkway was funded under the Mission 66 program. The Park Service's enthusiasm for roadbuilding projects resulted in a plethora of proposals for new projects, particularly in the East. These included:

- Allegheny Parkway, paralleling Skyline Drive and the Blue Ridge Parkway on the Allegheny side of the Shenandoah Valley from Harpers Ferry to the Cumberland Gap
- Blue Ridge Parkway extension to Georgia
- Chesapeake and Ohio Parkway, to be built over the Chesapeake and Ohio Canal; the road project was abandoned and the canal became Chesapeake and Ohio Canal National Historical Park
- Cumberland Parkway, linking Great Smoky Mountains National Park, Mammoth Cave National Park, Cumberland Gap National Historical Park and the Natchez Trace Parkway
- Mississippi River Parkway or Great River Road, an expansion of the existing Great River Road route on either side of the Mississippi for its entire length
- Linkage of the Blue Ridge Parkway, Colonial Parkway, Chesapeake and Ohio Parkway, and George Washington Memorial Parkway

Funding for such roads was not forthcoming from the Interstate Highway program, and the projects were never pursued.

== See also ==
- List of the United States National Park System official units
- National Park Service Rustic
- The National Parks: America's Best Idea

== Bibliography ==
- Carr, Ethan (2007). Mission 66: Modernism and the National Park Dilemma. Amherst, MA: University of Massachusetts Press. ISBN 978-1-55849-587-6.
- Allaback, Sarah (2000). Mission 66 Visitor Centers: The History of a Building Type. National Park Service. ISBN 0-16-050446-5.
