= Firehole Village =

Canceled visitor services development in Yellowstone National Park

Firehole Village was a proposed visitor services development in Yellowstone National Park, planned to divert development away from the sensitive area around Old Faithful. The project was proposed under the Mission 66 program, which sought to improve visitor services and park infrastructure throughout the National Park Service system. Although Firehole Village was never built, it was complemented by projects at Grant Village and Canyon Village, both of which were partially executed. The Firehole Village project, initially named "Wonderland," envisioned the demolition of the Old Faithful Inn, Old Faithful Lodge and other development in the Old Faithful area, restoring the area to a more natural appearance. The new development was planned for the area of the Lower Geyser Basin. First proposed in 1955, the Firehole Village plan was finally abandoned in 1964.
