= Allegheny Parkway =

Proposed scenic highway in the USA

The Allegheny Parkway was a proposed 632-mile (1,017 km) scenic highway, intended to extend from Harpers Ferry, West Virginia, to the Cumberland Gap, to be managed by the National Park Service. It was seen as a complementary project to the Skyline Drive and Blue Ridge Parkway on the east side of the Shenandoah Valley. Despite support from the Park Service, authorizing legislation was never passed and it was never built.

== Route description ==
The parkway was planned to start at Harpers Ferry, running northwest near the west bank of the Potomac River through Shepherdstown and Falling Waters before entering the Allegheny range at Hedgesville. Proceeding generally west through Morgan County in the Ridge-and-Valley Appalachians, the route would pass near Berkeley Springs, along the crest of Cacapon Mountain at Cacapon State Park, meeting the Allegheny Front just south of Keyser. From Keyser the route turned south to follow the Allegheny Front, passing Blackwater Falls and Canaan Valley. Farther south, the parkway was to pass near Seneca Rocks, Spruce Knob, the Sinks of Gandy, Droop Mountain Battlefield, White Sulphur Springs, Bluestone Lake in the New River valley and Breaks Interstate Park before ending at Cumberland Gap National Historical Park.

A spur to Hawks Nest State Park through the New River Gorge was also proposed.

== History ==
=== Proposal ===
Inspired by the Blue Ridge Parkway and Skyline Drive projects along the more easterly Blue Ridge Mountains, the Allegheny highway was to run along the crest of the Allegheny Front, mainly in West Virginia. The highway was seen as an economic development initiative for the isolated region. The proposal was part of a larger program promoted by U.S. Senator Robert C. Byrd to improve highway service in West Virginia. Of the 632-mile (1,017 km) total mileage, 420 miles (680 km) were to be in West Virginia, 176 miles (283 km) in Virginia, and 36 miles (58 km) in Kentucky.

Throughout the 1960s Byrd introduced legislation to create the parkway, but none passed. The parkway project was eventually superseded by the Appalachian Corridor Highway System along some of the same routes, and the state-administered Highland Scenic Highway, which was itself truncated.

Initially proposed to start at Hagerstown, Maryland, the northern terminus was altered to Harpers Ferry, West Virginia, since Hagerstown was incorporated into the Interstate Highway System by Interstate 81. A 1958 proposal for a Cumberlands Skyland Drive between Cumberland Gap and Breaks Interstate Park was incorporated into the Allegheny proposal.

Costs were estimated at $210 million in 1964 (equivalent to $1.58 billion in 2023) and included expenses associated with road construction, visitor accommodations and interpretive facilities, but excluding land acquisition costs. Much of the route was expected to run through Monongahela, George Washington and Jefferson national forests.

=== Fate ===
Although the 1964 Park Service report represented an enthusiastic endorsement of the parkway, it did not get sufficient support to be enacted. The project was also opposed by environmental groups concerned about intrusion into wild areas, some of which later became designated wilderness areas.
