= Shelton Johnson =

American novelist

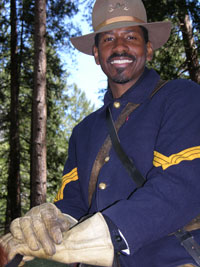
- Johnson in the uniform of a Buffalo Soldier
- Born: 1958 (age 67–68); Detroit, Michigan, U.S.
- Education: Cass Technical High School; University of Michigan (BA)
- Occupation: Park ranger
- Children: 1

Shelton Johnson (born 1958 in Detroit, Michigan) is a park ranger with the U.S. National Park Service, and works in Yosemite National Park. As of his retirement from Yosemite in the summer of 2026, he had worked 33 years of his 40-year career in Yosemite National Park.

Johnson began his career in Yellowstone National Park in 1987. He had numerous appearances in the Ken Burns documentary miniseries The National Parks: America's Best Idea, broadcast on PBS September 27 to October 2, 2009, and was called the "unexpected star" of the film. Johnson attended a preview of the film at the White House, where he discussed the documentary with President Barack Obama.

== Background ==
Johnson was born in Detroit in 1958. He is of African-American and Native American ancestry. While living in Germany, where his father was stationed with the U.S. Army, Shelton, at five years of age, went on a family vacation to the Berchtesgaden area in Germany's Bavarian Alps, which later became the Berchtesgaden National Park. He describes this visit as influential in developing his feeling of awe for mountains and the sky. His family also visited the Black Forest.

Johnson graduated from Cass Technical High School in Detroit in 1976. He attended college at the University of Michigan, where he graduated with a B.A. in English literature in 1981. He then joined the Peace Corps, serving as an English teacher in Liberia. He later returned to the University of Michigan to do graduate study in poetry, before going to work for the National Park Service.

== Work ==
Johnson is an advocate for bringing minorities, particularly African-Americans, to the National Parks and connecting them to the natural world. He believes that "one of the great losses to African culture from slavery was the loss of kinship with the earth". He dedicated his work to this issue when he found the history of Buffalo Soldiers, the African-American regiments of the historically segregated U.S. Army.

Johnson is now known for his research and publications on the assignments of the 24th Infantry Regiment and the 9th Cavalry Regiment to protect the new National Parks in California's Sierra Nevada. He created a website called Shadow Soldiers around a fictive letter to the Buffalo Soldiers at the parks, and wrote and maintains a segment on the Buffalo Soldiers on Yosemite National Park's official website. He wrote and performs a living history performance called Yosemite Through the Eyes of a Buffalo Soldier, 1904, which is presented as an interpretive program at the park and at locations around the country. \

In 2009, Johnson received the National Freeman Tilden Award as the best interpreting ranger in the National Park Service for his work with Ken Burns and Dayton Duncan on their national parks documentary.

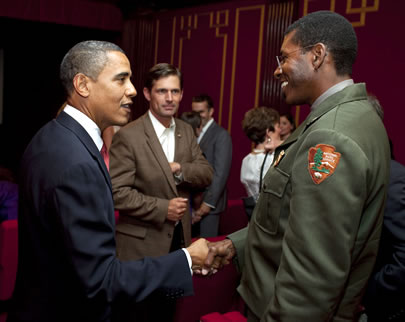
President Barack Obama and Shelton Johnson discussing the Ken Burns documentary on the National Parks

In 2010, Johnson invited Oprah Winfrey to visit the parks as an icon of the African-American community, in order to spread "the word that the national parks really are America's best idea, and that this beauty belongs to every American, including African-Americans". In October 2010, Winfrey (with her friend Gail King) spent two days and a night camping in Yosemite National Park, and dedicated two of her shows to the National Parks.

In 2010, Johnson was the recipient of Clemson University's William C. Everhart Award "for sustained achievements in interpretation that have illuminated, created insights to, and fostered an appreciation of our cultural and historical heritage."

Johnson is the author of the historical novel Gloryland, published by Sierra Club Books in 2009. The book is a fictional memoir of a Black Indian from South Carolina who becomes a Buffalo Soldier assigned to patrol Yosemite in 1903.

When asked why he does not seek a promotion and thus higher pay, Johnson was quoted as saying: "I facilitate astonishment. I didn't join the Park Service for money; I get paid in gasps."

== Personal life ==
Johnson is married and has one son. He resides in Mariposa County, near Yosemite National Park.

== Publications ==
- Shelton Johnson: Gloryland. Sierra Club Books, San Francisco, 2009, ISBN 978-1-57805-144-1. On Saturday, May 22, 2010, he spoke as part of the Sundance Tree Room Author Series regarding his historical novel "Gloryland".

== Recognition ==
- 1981 Major Hopwood Award in Poetry, University of Michigan, Ann Arbor, MI.
- 2002 Pacific West Region Freeman Tilden Award, National Parks Conservation Association.
- 2006 Honorary Kentucky Colonel, commission awarded by Ernie Fletcher, the Governor of Kentucky.
- 2009 Pacific West Region Freeman Tilden Award, National Parks Conservation Association.
- 2009 National Freeman Tilden Award, National Parks Conservation Association.
- 2010 William C. Everhart Award, Clemson University.
- 2011 George B. Hartzog, Jr. Award, Coalition of National Park Service Retirees.
- 2011 Environmental Leadership Award, Ecology Law Quarterly, University of California, Berkeley.
- 2011 Commencement Speaker for the University of Michigan's College of Literature, Science, and the Arts, English Department Graduates, on April 28, 2011, at the Michigan Theater, Ann Arbor, Michigan.
- 2012 Robin W. Winks Award, National Parks Conservation Association.
- 2013 Stewart L. Udall Award, Western National Parks Association.
- 2013 Legacy Leadership Award, The African American Experience Fund of the National Park Foundation.
- 2015 Superior Service Award, U.S. Department of the Interior.
- 2016 Nature's Inspiration Honoree, Committee for Green Foothills, Runnymede Farm, CA.
- 2016 Presented the Opening Plenary Talk for the 8th World Ranger Congress held in Estes Park, CO in 2016. This was the first time the triennial Congress was held in the United States. There were over 300 delegates in attendance from over 150 nations. This was also a National Park Service Centennial Event.
- 2017 Outdoor Retailer's List of the Top 25 Most Talented People in the Outdoor Industry, Outdoor Retailer, Salt Lake City, UT.
- 2017-18 Served as a member of the Nominating Committee for the Ken Burns American Heritage Prize, American Prairie Reserve.
- 2020 Featured on the cover of "American Way" magazine, and profiled in the story "Treasure Keepers" by Allie Conti which profiled multiple NPS employees and was published by American Airlines in August 2020. Monthly circulation for this publication was over 16 million passengers.
- 2021 Received the 2021 Lifetime Achievement Award from Outdoor Afro
- 2021 Became a member of the inaugural "The Explorers Club 50: The Storytellers". Nominated by Richard Wiese (FN'89). 400 membership nominations were received from 48 countries.
- 2022 Received the 2022 American Park Experience Award from the National Park Trust.
- 2022 On March 18, 2022, U.S. Representative Katie Porter, D-CA, 45th District, recognized Ranger Shelton Johnson on the floor of the U.S. Congress for his work in Yosemite communicating the hidden history of the African American U.S. Army troops (Twenty-fourth Regiment of Infantry and Ninth Regiment of Cavalry) who served as some of the first "Park Rangers" in Yosemite National Park over a decade prior to the creation of the National Park Service in 1916.
