= Grant Village =

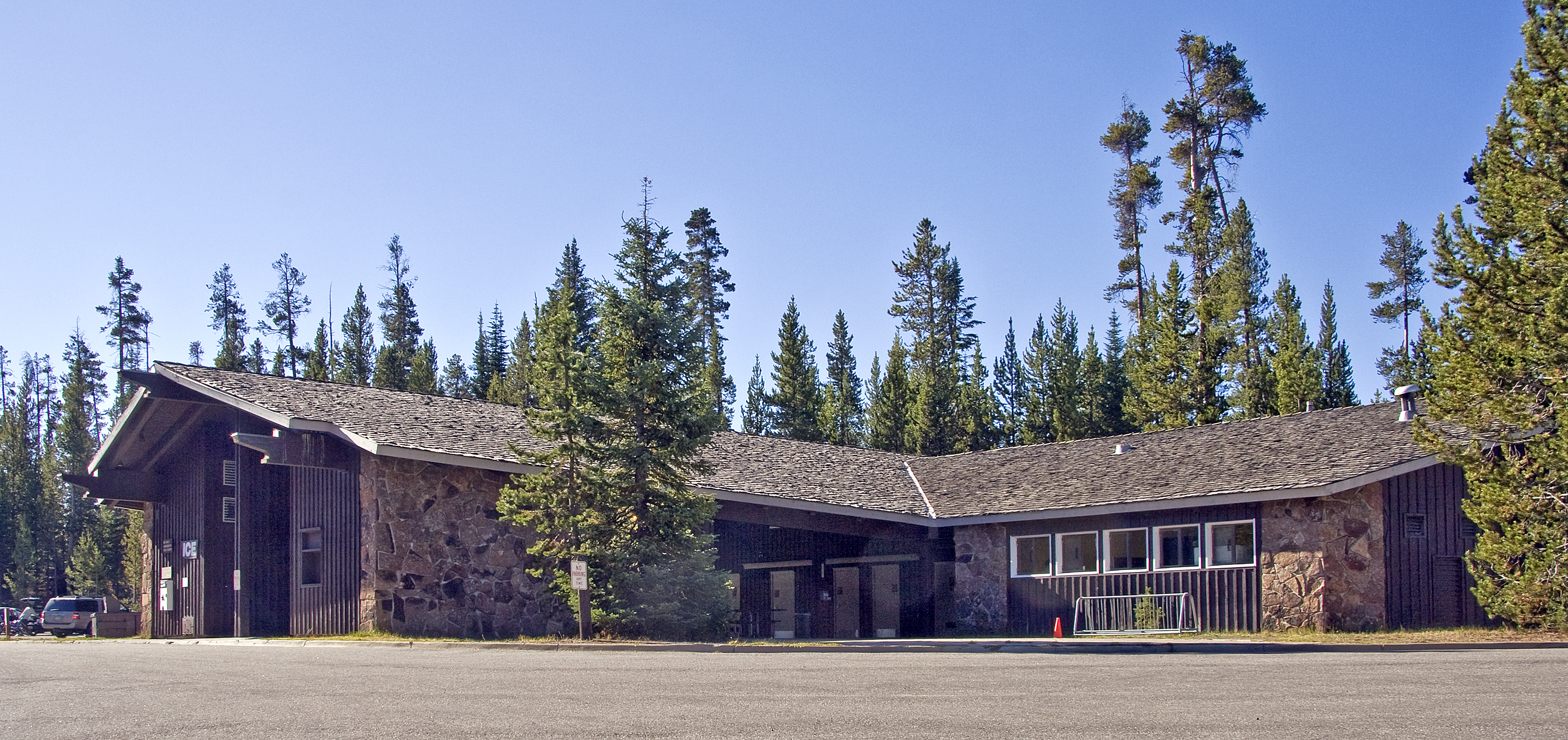
- Grant Village campground center
- Interactive map of Grant Village
- Coordinates: 44°23′25″N 110°33′22″W
- Country: United States
- State: Wyoming
- County: Teton
- National Park: Yellowstone National Park
- Established: June 1963
- Founder: National Park Service
- Elevation: 7,825 ft (2,385 m)
  - Summer (DST): Mountain Standard Time (PCT)

Grant Village is a developed area of Yellowstone National Park, offering lodging, camping and other visitor services. It is located on the southwest side of Yellowstone Lake, about 2 miles (3.2 km) south of West Thumb Geyser Basin. Grant Village was developed by the National Park Service and concessioners under the Mission 66 program, in an effort to relocate land-consuming visitor services and accommodations away from the park's major attractions and sensitive features. Grant Village was planned to allow the removal of development encroaching on the thermal basin at West Thumb. Originally named "Thumb Bay," the development was first proposed in 1955 by Park Service director Conrad L. Wirth to accommodate 2500 visitors with restaurants, gas stations, concessions and a marina.

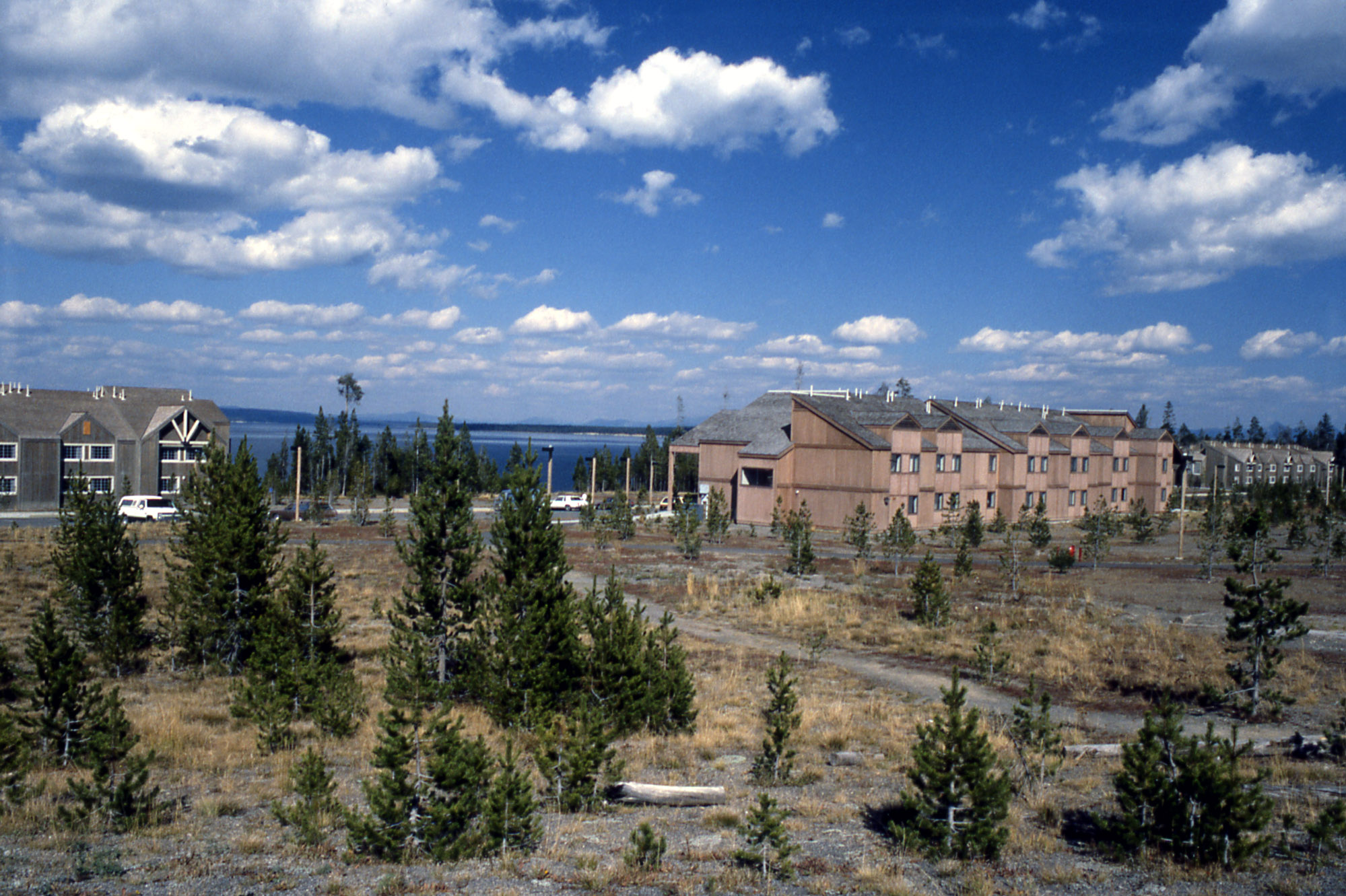
Grant Village lodging in 1987

By 1960 there was a divergence of opinion on the project's design: the primary concessioner, the Yellowstone Park Company, wanted a compact layout, while the Park Service's Western Office of Design desired a dispersed arrangement. Financial difficulties left the Yellowstone Park Company unable to exert much influence. Construction of the first phase of Grant Village, named after President Ulysses S. Grant, was completed in June 1963, comprising a campground, picnic area and boat ramp. A marina was completed by 1965, with construction of motel-style lodging, service facilities and restaurants continuing into the 1980s. The development remained smaller than originally intended; in 1981 Secretary of the Interior James G. Watt responded to pressure from the park gateway town of West Yellowstone, Montana, cutting the project's scope.

== See also ==
- Firehole Village
