= Barbara Sutteer =

American National Park Service employee (born 1941)

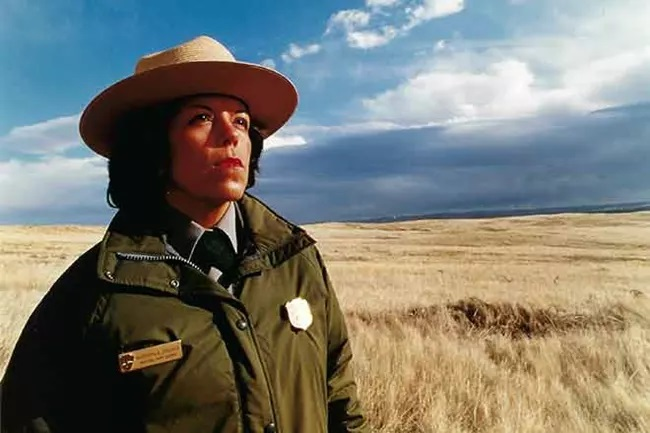
- Born: 1941 (age 84–85); Uintah and Ouray Indian Reservation, Utah
- Known for: Superintendent of Little Bighorn Battlefield National Monument
- Spouse: Hal Booher (m. 1969; div. 1990s)

Barbara Ann Sutteer (Booher) is a Native American retired National Park Service (NPS) employee. (Note: Sutteer used her married name, Booher, during most of her National Park Service employment, and reverted to her maiden name after her divorce in the 1990s.) Sutteer worked for the Federal Aviation Administration and the Bureau of Indian Affairs in Alaska for 17 years before being appointed the superintendent of Little Bighorn Battlefield National Monument, the first female and first Native American to serve in that position. Sutteer's work at Little Bighorn contributed to a more balanced presentation of the events that took place there, as well as increasing Indian representation in park employees, museum exhibits, and the stories told by park interpreters.

== Early life and education ==
Barbara Ann Sutteer was born circa 1941 and was raised on the Uintah and Ouray Indian Reservation, Utah. Her mother was of northern Ute descent and her father was Cherokee. Her parents worked for the Bureau of Indian Affairs.

Sutteer attended the University of Utah, but had to drop out due to a loss of tribal benefits which had included federal aid for education. She finished her degree in commercial and graphic art at Alaska Pacific University.

== Early career ==
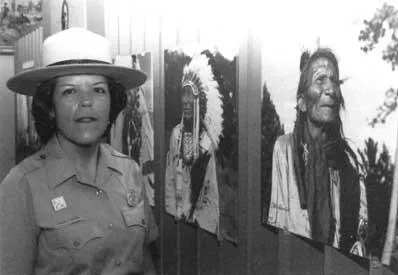
Barbara Sutteer Booher, National Park Service History Collection

Sutteer worked for the Federal Aviation Administration and then for the Bureau of Indian Affairs in Alaska. She worked on the National Park Service's Alaska Task Force. Sutteer worked for the Bureau of Indian Affairs for 17 years. Sutteer acted as a liaison between the Bureau of Land Management and the Bureau of Indian Affairs as an allotment coordinator in 1986.

In March, 1989, Sutteer entered the executive management training program under Lorraine Mintzmyer, the park service regional directory in the Rocky Mountain region, in March 1989. Mintzmyer offered Sutteer the superintendent position at Little Bighorn "because of the skills she demonstrated". Sutteer became the second Native American woman superintendent in the National Park Service on July 16, 1989. (Note: Ellen Lang, a Native Alaskan, was the first Native woman superintendent in the National Park Service.)

== Little Bighorn ==
The appointment of Sutteer to superintendent of Little Bighorn in July 1989 was contentious; critics from organizations associated with the site claimed Sutteer had been appointed solely because she was a woman and Indian. Fans of Custer claimed that Sutteer was unqualified for the position. People announced the appointment with the headline "General Custer Loses at Little Bighorn Again as an Indian Activist Becomes Keeper of His Legend". Sutteer's appointment enjoyed support from the Indian community. At the time of her appointment, Sutteer was the only Native American superintendent in the National Park Service.

As superintendent, Sutteer doubled the number of Native American employees at the monument. Her efforts to balance the narrative at the site included increasing the number of Indian exhibits in the museum and adding the Plains Indians' battle strategies to the talks given by interpreters. Sutteer's work to balance the representation of stories at Little Bighorn was met with resistance from Custer fans. The president and founder of the Order of Indian Wars campaigned to remove Sutteer as superintendent. Opponents of Sutteer's appointment criticized her for hiring more Indians and for weeds growing on Last Stand Hill, which the park has always maintained in its natural state.

Sutteer also worked to change the historical markers throughout the park which called the cavalrymen "fallen heroes" and the Cheyenne and Sioux "hostile Indians". However, she was unable to convince the Custer Battlefield Historical and Museum Association to include Bury My Heart at Wounded Knee in the information center's bookshop which the association managed.

Sutteer worked with then-U.S. Representative Ben Nighthorse Campbell on legislation to authorize a memorial to Native Americans at Little Bighorn and to change the site's name. As Campbell shepherded the bill to change the name of the battlefield through Congress, Sutteer received more than 600 letters on the issue; most were in favor, with fewer than dozen against the name change. When it finally passed and was signed into law, Campbell sent a copy of the bill, framed with the pen used to sign it and the personal note that he received from President George H. W. Bush, to Sutteer who displayed them the visitor center. Although the name change was welcome, Sutteer regretted that the renaming overshadowed the achievement of the Indian memorial, established at the same time. The Order of the Indian Wars also fought against the establishment of a memorial to honor the fallen Indians.

The name change and Indian Memorial gained national attention, and Sutteer appeared as keynote speaker at regional and national cultural awareness and equal opportunity events. In Stricken Field, Jerome Greene (retired research historian for the National Park Service), wrote that Sutteer's appointment "gave impetus to the park name change as well as to the movement for a lasting memorial."

The Custer Battlefield Historical and Museum Association, at the time a cooperating association with the National Park Service, (Note: By 1994, the National Park Service had terminated its association with the Custer Battlefield Historical and Museum Association, as it was felt that it had become more of an advocacy group. NPS noted "attacks on the park staff by letter, through the media, through congressional representatives, and by the membership directly".) objected vociferously to Sutteer's appointment and to the renaming of the site. The support of Campbell was important to Sutteer during the controversies over her appointment and the renaming of the battlefield.

In 1991, Sutteer participated in the ceremony burying a partial skeleton discovered in 1989, accompanied by two color guards: one Cheyenne and the other from Fort Carson's 7th Cavalry. In June, 1992, Sutteer closed the tour road at the south entrance to avoid conflict with a nearby sun dance on private land attended by Russell Means and members of the American Indian Movement.

Sutteer served as superintendent at Little Bighorn for over three years, and established close relations with the Crows, Cheyenne, Lakotas, and Arapahos. Tribe members began participating in the annual battle commemoration at her invitation. When she attended a powwow in Ogden, Utah, Northern Utes performed an honor dance for her. In Japan, Lummi tribal elders visiting from Washington prayed for Sutteer's welfare during a ceremony. Sweats were held in her honor. During the annual return of tribal horseback riders to Little Bighorn in 2009, Sutteer was honored by the Cheyenne for her work with the tribes while superintendent. Sutteer's performance as superintendent was praised by local Indian leaders. Sutteer left Little Bighorn early in 1993.

On June 25, 2003, Sutteer and other former superintendents who had worked for establishment of the Indian Memorial hosted the dedication ceremonies at Little Bighorn.

== Later career ==
Sutteer was hired as the Indian Affairs coordinator at the National Park Service Rocky Mountain Regional Office in 1993, where she consulted with tribes about Wounded Knee Massacre Site, Devil's Tower National Monument, Pipestone National Monument, and Washita Battlefield National Historic Site. As part of an NPS study of the Sand Creek Massacre Site in 1998, Sutteer developed a tribal consultation plan and helped gather oral histories, work that helped lead to the authorization of the Sand Creek Massacre National Historic Site in 2001. Sutteer also helped establish the NPS Office of American Indian Trust Responsibility.

After 32 years of federal service, Sutteer retired in 2001. She became a board member for the Mesa Verde Foundation and for the First People's Center for Education, and board secretary for the National American Indian, Alaskan, and Hawaiian Education Development Center, and continued to consult with the NPS.

== Personal life ==
Sutteer is a licensed pilot, despite glaucoma in both eyes. In 1969, Sutteer married Hal Booher, a planner for the Bureau of Land Management. They divorced in the 1990s and she reverted to her maiden name.
