= The National Parks: America's Best Idea =

2009 television documentary miniseries by Ken Burns

- Genre: Documentary
- Written by: Dayton Duncan
- Directed by: Ken Burns
- Starring: Tom Hanks; Derek Jacobi; Andy García; Josh Lucas; Eli Wallach; Campbell Scott; Sam Waterston; John Lithgow; George Takei; Philip Bosco; Carolyn McCormick; Adam Arkin; Kevin Conway
- Narrated by: Peter Coyote
- Country of origin: United States
- No. of episodes: 6

Production
- Producers: Ken Burns; Dayton Duncan
- Running time: 12 hours

Original release
- Release: September 27 – October 2, 2009

The National Parks: America's Best Idea is a 2009 television documentary miniseries by director/producer Ken Burns and producer/writer Dayton Duncan which features the United States National Park system and traces the system's history. The series won two 2010 Emmy Awards; one for Outstanding Nonfiction Series and one for Outstanding Writing for Nonfiction Programming in Episode 2 "The Last Refuge". A companion book (ISBN 978-0307268969) was released alongside.

== Cast ==
Peter Coyote is the narrator of all episodes, with first-person voices supplied by Adam Arkin, Philip Bosco, Kevin Conway, Andy García, Tom Hanks, Derek Jacobi, Clay Jenkinson, John Lithgow, Josh Lucas, Carolyn McCormick, Campbell Scott, Gene Jones, George Takei, Eli Wallach and Sam Waterston. Shelton Johnson, a National Park ranger, was also featured.

== Episodes ==
No.	Title	Original release date	US viewers (millions)
1	"The Scripture of Nature (1851–1890)"	September 27, 2009	N/A
The episode shows the beauty of Yosemite Valley and the geyser wonderland of Yellowstone. Additionally, it offers a lengthy discussion of how Yosemite and Yellowstone National Parks were created and shows how John Muir became their eloquent defender. Runtime: 115 minutes
2	"The Last Refuge (1890–1915)"	September 28, 2009	N/A
Theodore Roosevelt uses the presidential powers of the Antiquities Act to add National Monuments, including Devils Tower, Mesa Verde, Petrified Forest, Muir Woods, Crater Lake and the Grand Canyon. Hetch Hetchy Valley is lost through damming. Roosevelt's speech at the dedication of Yellowstone's Roosevelt Arch states the ultimate purpose of the National Parks: For the Benefit and Enjoyment of the People. Runtime: 133 minutes
3	"The Empire of Grandeur (1915–1919)"	September 29, 2009	N/A
This episode covers the creation of the National Park Service and the influence of its early leaders Stephen Mather and Horace M. Albright, and wealthy industrialists who Mather persuaded to help him champion the park system. Runtime: 112 minutes
4	"Going Home (1920–1933)"	September 30, 2009	N/A
This episode focuses on the time when America embraced the automobile, setting off an explosion in the number of park visits. Also, the Rockefellers quietly buy up land in the Teton Mountain Range. Runtime: 116 minutes
5	"Great Nature (1933–1945)"	October 1, 2009	N/A
This episode emphasizes the societal impacts of the park concept, including new environmental and naturalistic perspectives, employment opportunities, and application of the park idea to additional geographical locations. Runtime: 115 minutes
6	"The Morning of Creation (1946–1980)"	October 2, 2009	N/A
This episode offers details about the ecological damage caused by 62 million visitors each year, the debates over the allocation of federal properties in Alaska, and the controversial decision to reintroduce wolves in Yellowstone which had been hunted to extinction in all other parks. Runtime: 115 minutes

Some foreign releases of the series – notably Australia – have separated it into 12 one-hour-long episodes.

== Release ==
External videos
- Presentation by Ken Burns and Dayton Duncan on The National Parks at the National Book Festival, September 26, 2009, C-SPAN
- Interview with Ken Burns and Dayton Duncan on The National Parks at the National Book Festival, September 26, 2009, C-SPAN

The series was previewed in a seven-minute segment at the end of the fourth episode of Burns's 2007 PBS documentary, The War. The first two-hour episode premiered at the Hopkins Center for the Arts at Dartmouth College on April 17, 2009. Episodes debuted daily, airing from Sunday, September 27 to Friday, October 2, with full episodes online the following day.

== Critical reception ==
The National Parks: America's Best Idea has received generally positive reviews from television critics. Mark Rahner of The Seattle Times wrote, "Stirring and sublime."
