= Artist Point =

Overlook in Yellowstone National Park

Artist Point Lookout Point
- Cliff
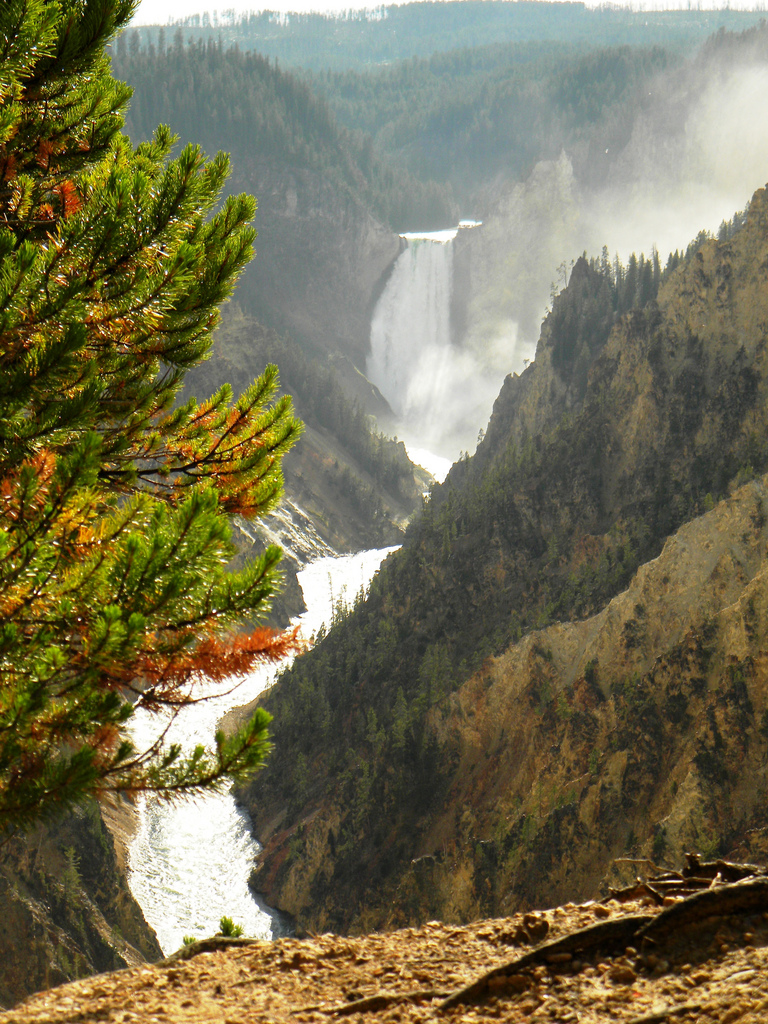
- View from Artist Point

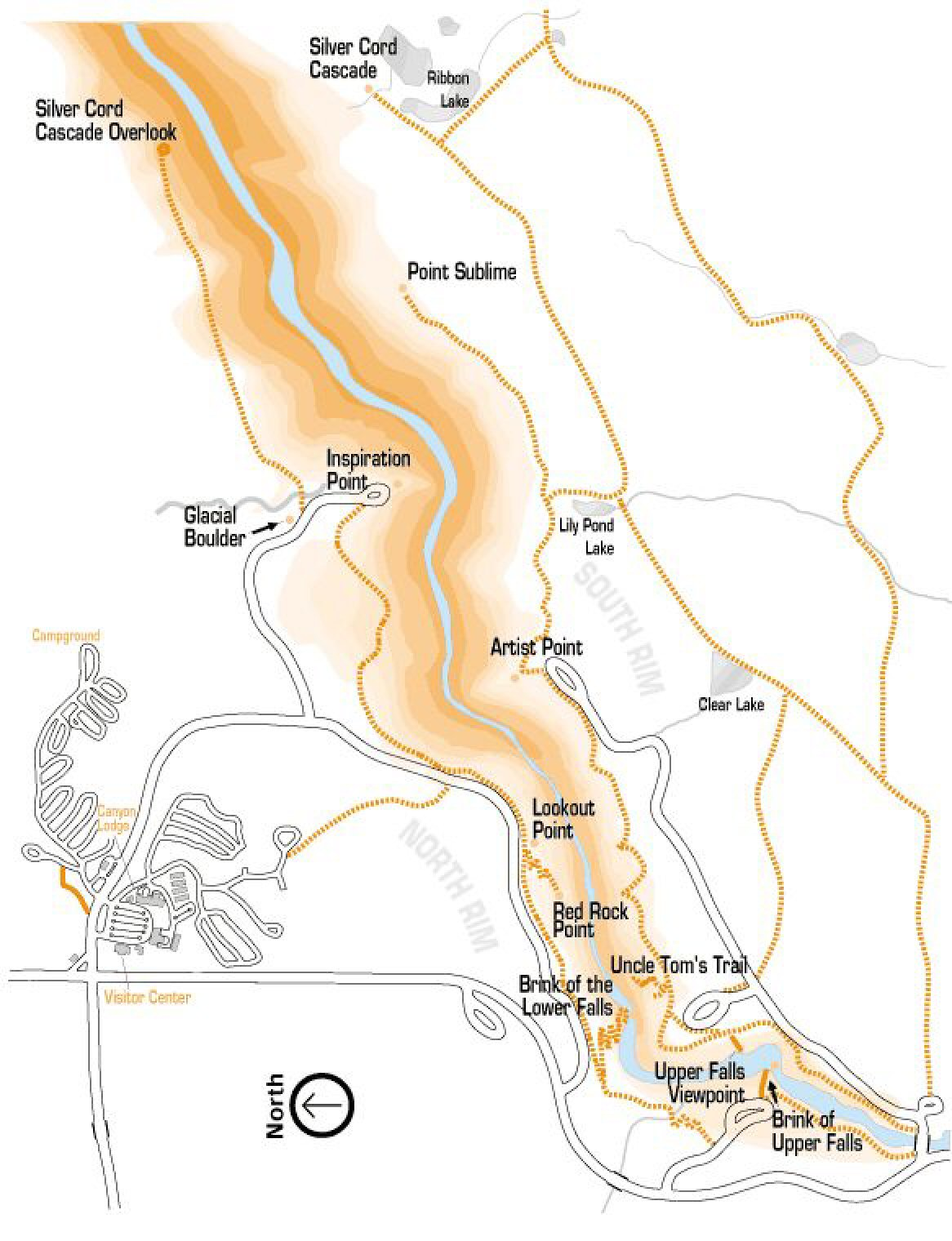
- Coordinates: 44°43′16″N 110°28′46″W
- Location: Yellowstone National Park, Park County, Wyoming, United States
- Elevation: 2,329 m (7,641 ft)

Artist Point is an overlook point on the edge of a cliff on the south rim of the Grand Canyon of the Yellowstone in Yellowstone National Park, Wyoming. The point is located east-northeast of Yellowstone Falls on the Yellowstone River. Artist Point was originally named in 1883 by Frank Jay Haynes who improperly believed that the point was the place at which painter Thomas Moran sketched his 1872 depictions of the falls. Later work determined that the sketches were made from the north rim, but the name Artist Point stuck.
