= Fenn treasure =

Modern treasure in the United States, discovered in 2020

The Fenn Treasure was a cache of gold and jewels that Forrest Fenn, an art dealer and author from Santa Fe, New Mexico, hid in the Rocky Mountains of the United States. It was found approximately a decade later in 2020 in Wyoming by an anonymous treasure hunter later revealed to be former journalist and medical student Jack Stuef. In attempting to honor what he perceives to be Fenn's wishes after his death in September 2020, he has refused to reveal the location of the treasure. An auction of items from the treasure chest in December 2022 resulted in $1.3 million in sales.

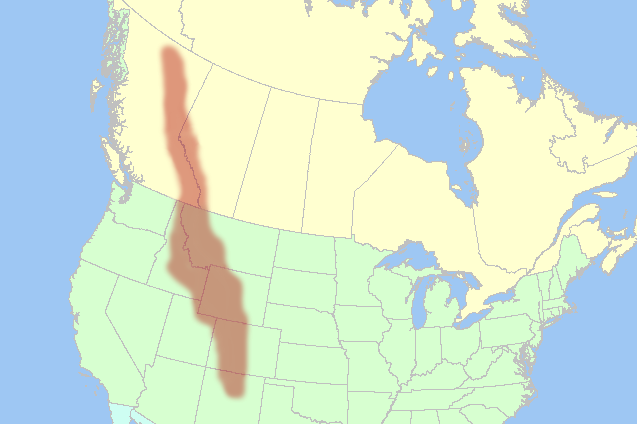
Map highlighting the Rocky Mountains, where the treasure was hidden within the United States.

== History ==
Forrest Fenn
- Born: Forrest Burke Fenn; August 22, 1930; Temple, Texas, U.S.
- Died: September 7, 2020 (aged 90); Santa Fe, New Mexico, U.S.
- Resting place: Santa Fe National Cemetery
- Occupations: Combat pilot; art dealer; author

Forrest Fenn (August 22, 1930 – September 7, 2020) was born in Temple, Texas to William "Marvin" Fenn, a teacher by profession and Lillie Gay Simpson, who had worked as a nurse before her marriage.

The middle child of the three children born to the couple, Fenn attended Temple High School in 1947, after which he studied at Temple Junior College. Struggling academically, Fenn preferred to spend his time outdoors with friends, rather than studying.

Fenn left school after graduatingand enrolled in the Air Force on September 6, 1950. During his time as a pilot in the United States Air Force, Fenn obtained the rank of Major. He was awarded the Silver Star for his service in the Vietnam War where he flew 328 combat missions in 365 days.

He retired from the Air Force and ran the Arrowsmith-Fenn Gallery with his partner Rex Arrowsmith, which became the Fenn Galleries which he operated with his wife, Peggy. The gallery was located in Santa Fe, New Mexico, and sold a variety of Native American artifacts, paintings, bronze sculptures, and other art, including forged copies of works by Modigliani, Monet, Degas, and other artists. The gallery reportedly grossed $6 million a year.

In 1988, Fenn was diagnosed with cancer and given a prognosis that it was likely terminal. This inspired him to hide a treasure chest in an outdoor location with the purpose of creating a public search for it. He considered using the location as his final resting place as well. He recovered from the illness and in 2010 self-published The Thrill of the Chase: A Memoir, a collection of short stories from his life. He described a treasure chest that he said contained gold nuggets, rare coins, jewelry, and gemstones. He went on to write that he hid the chest "in the mountains somewhere north of Santa Fe". Fenn said that the stories in the book included hints to the chest's location and that the poem found in the chapter "Gold and More" contained nine clues that would lead a searcher to the chest. Fenn's book and story prompted a treasure hunt in the Rocky Mountains of New Mexico, Colorado, Wyoming, and Montana. The value of the chest was estimated to be as high as $2 million, depending on the appraisal of the items. In December 2022, after the treasure had been found, an auction of items from the treasure chest resulted in $1.3 million in sales. Fenn claimed to make no money on the sale of the self-published The Thrill of the Chase: A Memoir books out of concern for being labeled a fraud by critics. The proceeds from his second memoir, Too Far to Walk, were a gift to his grandchildren.

Before the treasure hunt, Fenn came into conflict with authorities over federal antiquities law during Operation Cerberus Action. Federal Bureau of Investigation (FBI) agents raided his home in 2009 as part of an investigation into artifact looting in the Four Corners area. Items in his possession reportedly included pieces of chain mail from the Pecos National Historical Park, human hair, a feathered talisman, and a bison skull, some of which were confiscated by federal authorities; no charges were filed. Two people targeted in the case died by suicide, and Fenn blamed the FBI for their deaths.

Fenn died a few months after his treasure was found, on September 7, 2020, at the age of 90.

== Deaths ==
Five people died while searching for the treasure. This led the chief of the New Mexico State Police, Pete Kassetas, to publicly implore Fenn to end the treasure hunt, stating "He's putting lives at risk."

- Randy Bilyeu went missing in January 2016 and was found dead in July. His body was discovered by workers along the Rio Grande, and an autopsy could not determine cause of death. Bilyeu's ex-wife publicly stated her belief that the Fenn Treasure was a hoax.
- Jeff Murphy (age 53) of Batavia, Illinois, was found dead in Yellowstone National Park on June 9, 2017, after falling about 500 feet (150 m) down a steep slope. Yellowstone officials did not provide details to the public concerning their investigation, but KULR-TV filed a Freedom of Information Act request. The television station reports that Murphy's wife told park authorities that he was looking for the treasure when she first reported him missing.
- Pastor Paris Wallace of Grand Junction, Colorado, told family members that he was searching for a buried treasure, but he failed to show up for a planned family meeting on June 14, 2017. His car was found parked near the Taos Junction Bridge and his body was found 5 to 7 miles (8.0 to 11.3 km) downstream along the Rio Grande.
- Eric Ashby (age 31) was found dead in Colorado's Arkansas River on July 28, 2017. Friends and family stated that he had moved to Colorado in 2016 to look for the treasure, and was last seen on June 28 rafting on the river 10 to 15 miles (16 to 24 km) upstream from where his body was found. The raft overturned and Ashby had been missing since that time.
- Michael Wayne Sexson (age 53) of Deer Trail, Colorado, was found dead by rescuers on March 21, 2020, alongside his unnamed 65-year-old male companion, who later recovered in hospital (later named as Steven Inlow). Authorities were notified by the person who rented a pair of snowmobiles to the men. The pair were discovered within 5 miles (8.0 km) of a site they had been rescued from a month earlier, near the Dinosaur National Monument along the Utah-Colorado border.

== Controversy ==
A number of notable controversies surrounded the treasure hunt. Several searchers were cited or arrested for committing legal infractions in the course of their pursuits.

- An unidentified man searching for the treasure was arrested in New Mexico in 2013 and charged with damaging a cultural artifact for digging beneath an iron cross of a descanso near the Pecos River.
- In April 2014, national park rangers detained Darrel Seller and Christy Strawn for having a metal detector and digging in Yellowstone National Park while searching for the Fenn treasure. On May 9, park rangers accused the couple of camping without a permit and starting a small fire.
- Scott Conway was cited by New Mexico State Parks officers after he dug a large hole on state land near Heron Lake while looking for the Fenn treasure.
- A Pennsylvania man, Robert Miller, was arrested for burglary, breaking and entering, and criminal damage to property in October 2018. Miller broke into Fenn's property and was hauling away a Spanish-style chest he thought was the treasure. He was caught in the act and held at gunpoint until law enforcement arrived.
- In December 2019, David Harold Hanson of Colorado Springs, Colorado, filed a lawsuit in U.S. District Court against Forrest Fenn. The lawsuit alleges Fenn made several fraudulent statements and deceived searchers. Although Hanson attempted to reopen it, the case was closed.
- In January 2020, David Christensen of Indiana had to be rescued by Yellowstone National Park rangers after he attempted to rappel over 850 feet (260 m) from a rope tied to a railing into the Grand Canyon of the Yellowstone. He was ordered to spend a week in jail and pay rescue costs of just over $4,000. He received a five-year ban from the park. Disregarding Fenn's remarks that no climbing was required, Christensen remained convinced at his sentencing his solution was correct.
- In 2020, Brian Erskine of Arizona sued the Fenn estate claiming poem and clues led to a site in Colorado and he asserts it was his solution to the riddle that led Fenn to call off the treasure hunt.
- In April 2021, Rodrick Craythorn was sentenced for digging in a Yellowstone National Park cemetery.
- In July 2021, a French treasure hunter named Bruno Raphoz filed a $10 million lawsuit against Fenn's estate in the United States District Court for the District of New Mexico. According to the complaint, Raphoz had determined that the treasure was hidden in southwestern Colorado, informed Fenn of his solution, and began making preparations to retrieve it. However, his plans were delayed by the COVID-19 pandemic, and Fenn announced soon afterward that the treasure had been found in Wyoming. Raphoz contended that Fenn took advantage of the delay to move the chest from Colorado to Wyoming, noting that its exact final location has not been specified by Stuef or any of Fenn's relatives. The suit was dismissed on July 16, 2021; Raphoz subsequently filed an amended complaint in an attempt to reopen it, but was denied on August 5.
- In 2021, Terry Coombs sued the Fenn estate stating an oral contract was made through his writings by saying they could find his treasure by following clues in his books and then broke his word by telling a personal friend where to find the treasure.
- In May 2022, Jamie McCracken filed a claim against Fenn’s estate accusing Fenn of moving the treasure on four separate occasions.
- In October 2024, Clifford Robert Cummings sued the Fenn estate.
- In June 2026, searcher Barbara Andersen originally of Chicago, Illinois was issued a restraining order for harassing author Douglas Preston. Andersen alleges a conspiracy behind the treasure hunt and alleges she was the real solver.

== Treasure chest ==
The treasure chest features a bronze construction with a wood liner and locking front clasp. According to Fenn, it weighs about 22 pounds (10.0 kg) and its dimensions are 10 by 10 by 5 inches (250 mm × 250 mm × 130 mm). The chest features scenes and reliefs with knights scaling walls on ladders and maidens above throwing flowers down upon them. This style of work appears to be references to the Le Roman de la Rose poem about the pursuit of love and scaling the "Castle of Love." The chest was made in France by Emile Pinedo in the late 19th or early 20th century. Because of the popularity of the treasure hunt, artists have made modern recreations based on Fenn's chest.

== Discovery ==
On June 6, 2020, Fenn posted on the searcher blog Thrill of the Chase that the treasure had been found:

"It was under a canopy of stars in the lush, forested vegetation of the Rocky Mountains and had not moved from the spot where I hid it more than 10 years ago. I do not know the person who found it, but the poem in my book led him to the precise spot. I congratulate the thousands of people who participated in the search and hope they will continue to be drawn by the promise of other discoveries. So the search is over. Look for more information and photos in the coming days."

This was subsequently confirmed by Fenn, who further disclosed in a news article that the finder was a male from the eastern United States who had sent him a photograph. The identity of the finder, the photograph, and the location of the treasure were not revealed. On June 16, Fenn released additional photos on the Thrill of the Chase blog site including of himself examining the contents of the chest and one of it sitting in weathered condition implicitly on or near the site where it was found. On July 22 Fenn stated on the Thrill of the Chase blog site that the treasure's finder had authorized him to disclose, in the interest of closure for many of its searchers, that it had been hidden in Wyoming.

In December 2020, Jack Stuef, a medical student from Michigan, revealed that he found Fenn's treasure chest and decided to disclose his identity by going public in an interview with Outside. Due to safety reasons he preferred to stay anonymous but a lawsuit was expected to reveal his identity.

Stuef revealed that two small items indicated in pre-find publicity were not present in the chest, a small gold frog on a necklace and a Spanish emerald ring found at San Lazaro. When Stuef notified Fenn about the missing items, Fenn located the frog within his collection and presented it to Stuef. However, Fenn was not able to find the missing emerald ring.

Despite Stuef coming forward as the finder, skepticism of the discovery remains and conspiracy theories around the conclusion of the treasure hunt are common and multiple lawsuits have been filed as a result.

== Clues and solution ==
In his 2010 book, Fenn published a poem which read, in part:

Begin it where warm waters halt
And take it in the canyon down,
Not far, but too far to walk.
Put in below the home of Brown.

From there it’s no place for the meek,
The end is drawing ever nigh;
There’ll be no paddle up your creek,
Just heavy loads and water high.

If you’ve been wise and found the blaze,
Look quickly down, your quest to cease,
But tarry scant with marvel gaze,
Just take the chest and go in peace.

In 2013, journalist Tony Dokoupil speculated that the treasure lay within Yellowstone National Park after reading Fenn's unpublished autobiography, which mentions "Nine Mile Hole" as Fenn's "top secret" fishing spot in the park. In a July 2019 blog post titled "River Bathing is Best", Fenn described his childhood 'secret bathing spot' in Yellowstone National Park where a geyser feeds into the Firehole River. Wrote Fenn: "I could change the water temperature around my body just by moving a foot or so."

In the 2025 Netflix docuseries Gold & Greed, searcher Justin Posey visited the site where the chest had been found and shared his interpretation of the poem. Posey identified Madison Junction, where the Firehole and Gibbon River meet to form the Madison River, as the place where "warm waters halt". According to Posey, a car trip through Madison Canyon leads to Nine Mile Hole, a fishing spot known for its brown trout ("Home of Brown"). Friend Cynthia Meachum confirms this interpretation, reporting Fenn had shared that "Mr. Brown" was the family nickname for a large, elusive trout that could be hooked but not caught; Meachum reports her response was "You have to be effing kidding me, that's the dumbest thing I ever heard". Posey argued that "the blaze" was a tree that had since fallen down.

== In popular culture ==
The Fenn treasure hunt has been featured in television shows, magazine articles, and books.

- Douglas Preston had seen Forrest Fenn's treasure chest long before Fenn hid it. It is credited as the inspiration for Preston's 2003 novel The Codex.
- The treasure hunt was featured in a 2015 episode of Expedition Unknown, "Finding Fenn's Fortune". Series host Josh Gates interviewed Forrest Fenn before joining several groups of treasure hunters as they searched multiple states in the Rocky Mountains.
- The Lure (2017) is a documentary feature film about the treasure directed by Tomas Leach.
- A 2018 episode of the web series Buzzfeed Unsolved: True Crime, "The Treacherous Treasure Hunt of Forrest Fenn", features the treasure hunt.
- On July 8, 2020, in an episode of Discovery Channel's Expedition Unknown: Uncovered taped prior to the treasure being found, Josh Gates tries to decode the clues of the poem.
- There have been several podcasts about Forrest Fenn and the treasure hunt. In June 2022, Calvary Audio released the nine-part podcast series X Marks the Spot: The Legend of Forrest Fenn. The podcast is narrated by Branden Morgan and is executive produced by Dana Brunetti and Keegan Rosenberger. It was followed by the nine-part series Missed Fortune, hosted by Peter Frick-Wright and released on Apple TV+ in August 2022. Both series explore the history of Forrest Fenn and the treasure hunting community.

In November 2025, the podcast Cautionary Tales included a two-part episode on the Fenn treasure, titled "The Treasure Hunt that Broke America".

- In 2025, Netflix released a three part docuseries called Gold & Greed: The Hunt for Fenn's Treasure. It features the treasure hunt, the lives that were lost and the aftermath following the treasure being found.

== Books ==
- Barbarisi, Daniel (2021). Chasing the Thrill: Obsession, Death, and Glory in America's Most Extraordinary Treasure Hunt. Knopf Doubleday Publishing. ISBN 9780525656173.
- Fenn, Forrest (2010). The Thrill of the Chase. One Horse Land & Cattle Co. ISBN 9780967091785.
- Fenn, Forrest (2013). Too Far to Walk. One Horse Land & Cattle Co. ISBN 9780967091792.
- Fenn, Forrest (2017). Once Upon a While. Phat Page Design. ISBN 9780692950555.
- Fenn, Forrest (2018). Once Upon a While Revised. One Horse Land & Cattle Co. ISBN 9780692196281.
