= Thomas Leach =

Thomas Leach is the name of:

- Tommy Leach (1877-1969), American baseball player
- Tony Leach (1903-1970), English international footballer

== See also ==
- Tomas Leach, British film director
- Thomas Leech, British High Court judge
- Tom Leetch, American filmmaker
- Thomas Leitch (born 1951), American academic and film scholar
