= Uncle Tom's Trail =

Coordinates: 44°42′57″N 110°29′43″W

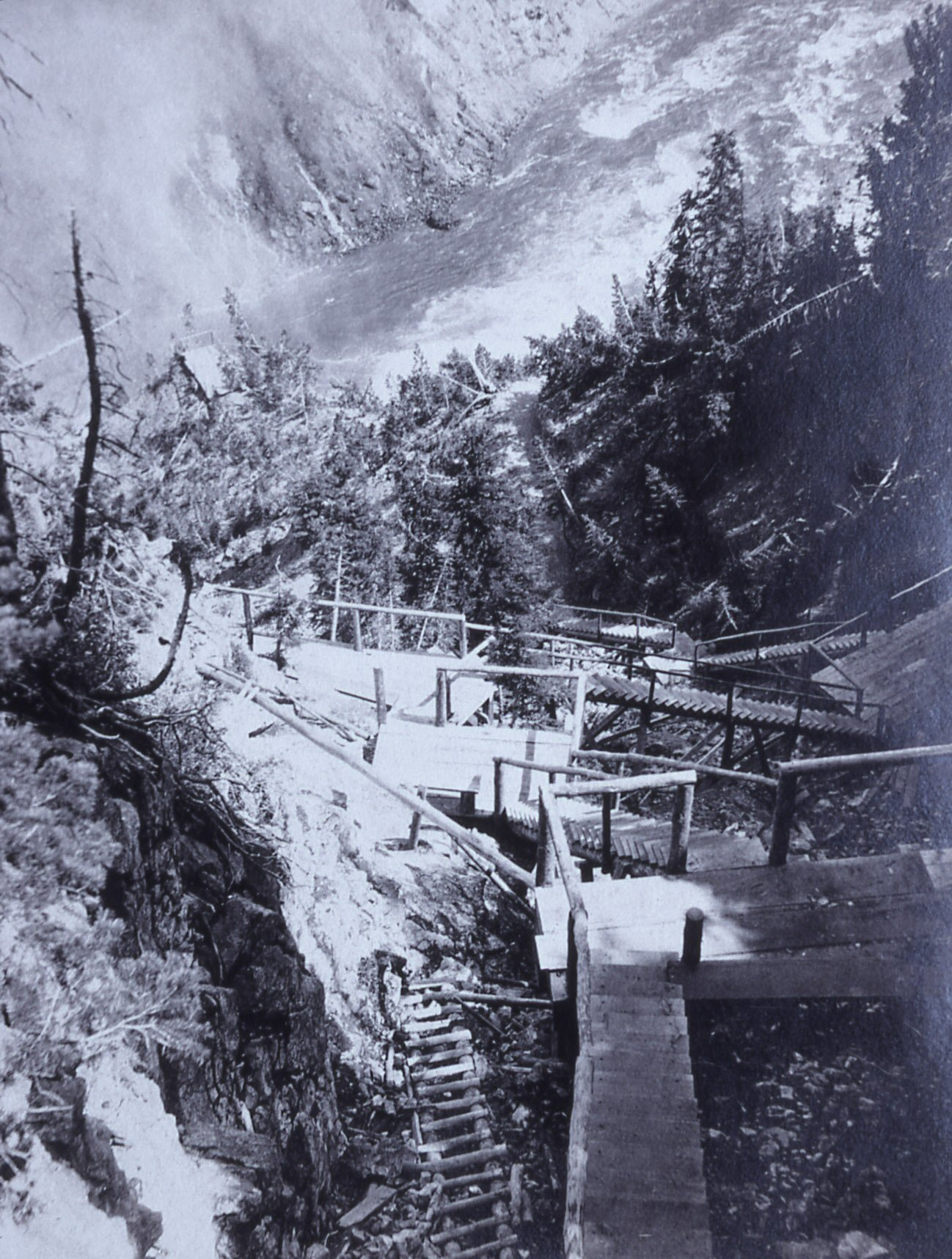
- Uncle Tom's Trail, circa 1906
- Location: Grand Canyon of the Yellowstone, Yellowstone National Park
- Established: 1898
- Use: Sightseeing
- Elevation change: 500 feet (150 m)

Uncle Tom's Trail was a steep stairway descent from the south rim of the Grand Canyon of the Yellowstone to a viewpoint near the base of the Lower Yellowstone Falls in Yellowstone National Park. The trail was constructed in 1898 by park concessionaire, "Uncle Tom" H. F. Richardson when the Department of the Interior granted Richardson a permit to operate a ferry across the Yellowstone River. He ferried park visitors across the Yellowstone River above the current site of the Chittenden Memorial Bridge then escorted them to the trail and they traveled down to the base of the Lower Falls via ladders and ropes. Upon their return, visitors were provided a picnic lunch on the south rim of the canyon before returning via the ferry. In 1903 when the original Chittenden Bridge was built, Richardson's ferry business began to decline. In 1905, when the government built a wooden stairway, visitors were increasingly unwilling to pay Richardson the $1 fee for the tour to the base of the falls. 1906 was the last year he operated tours in the canyon.

Uncle Tom's Trail has been maintained and improved by the National Park Service. While the original trail had rope ladders and 528 steps, the newer trail has 328 steps (and no rope ladders) and goes 3/4 of the way down the side of the canyon to a viewing platform downriver from Lower Falls. However, in 2019 Uncle Tom's Trail was closed by the National Park Service. It has been removed from all current National Park Service Publications

== Permanent closure ==
The Yellowstone Public Affairs Office confirms the National Park Service has permanently closed Uncle Tom's Trail and "plans to remove the staircase in the future."

== Notes ==
Uncle Tom’s Trail
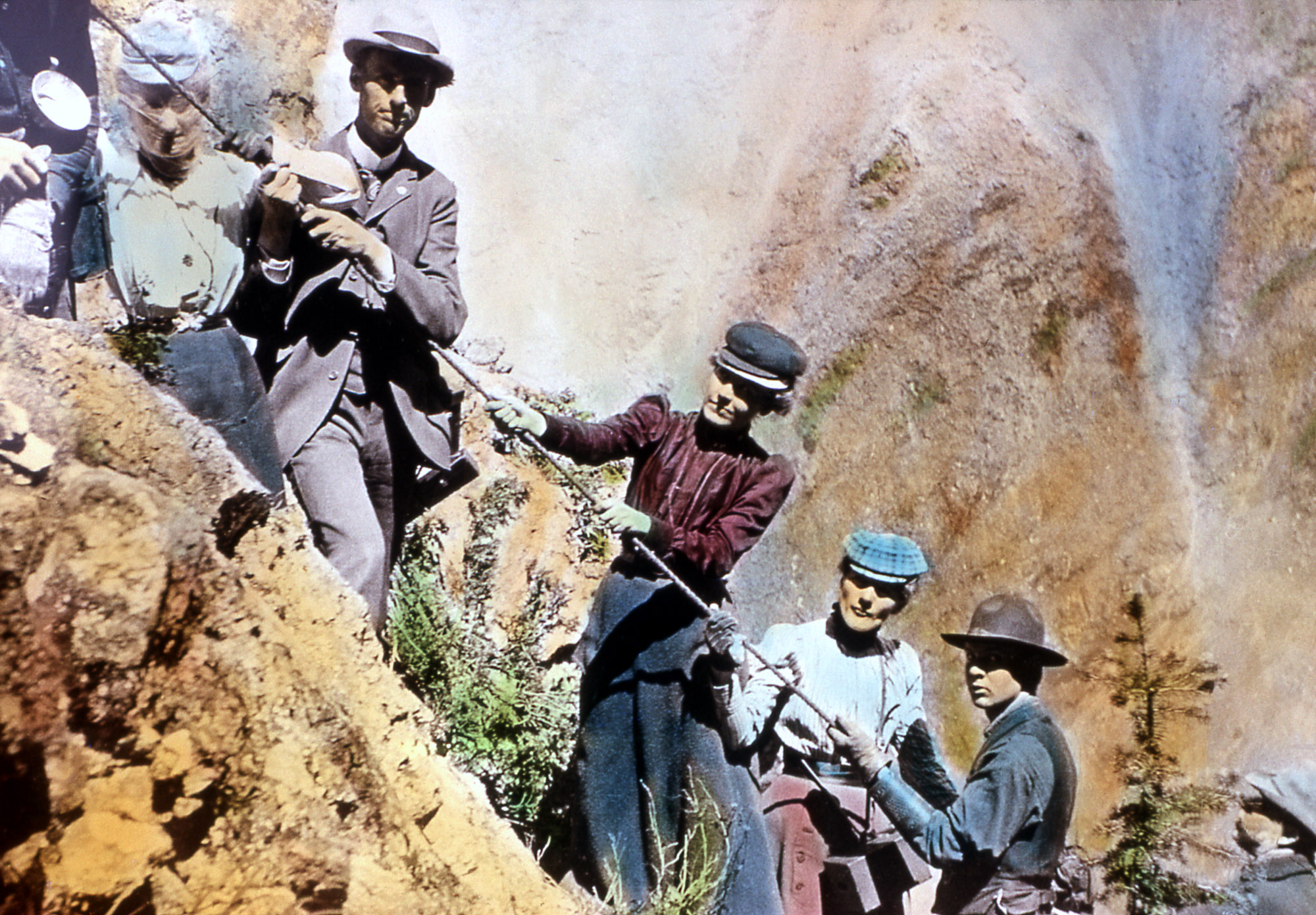
Visitors descending Uncle Tom's Trail

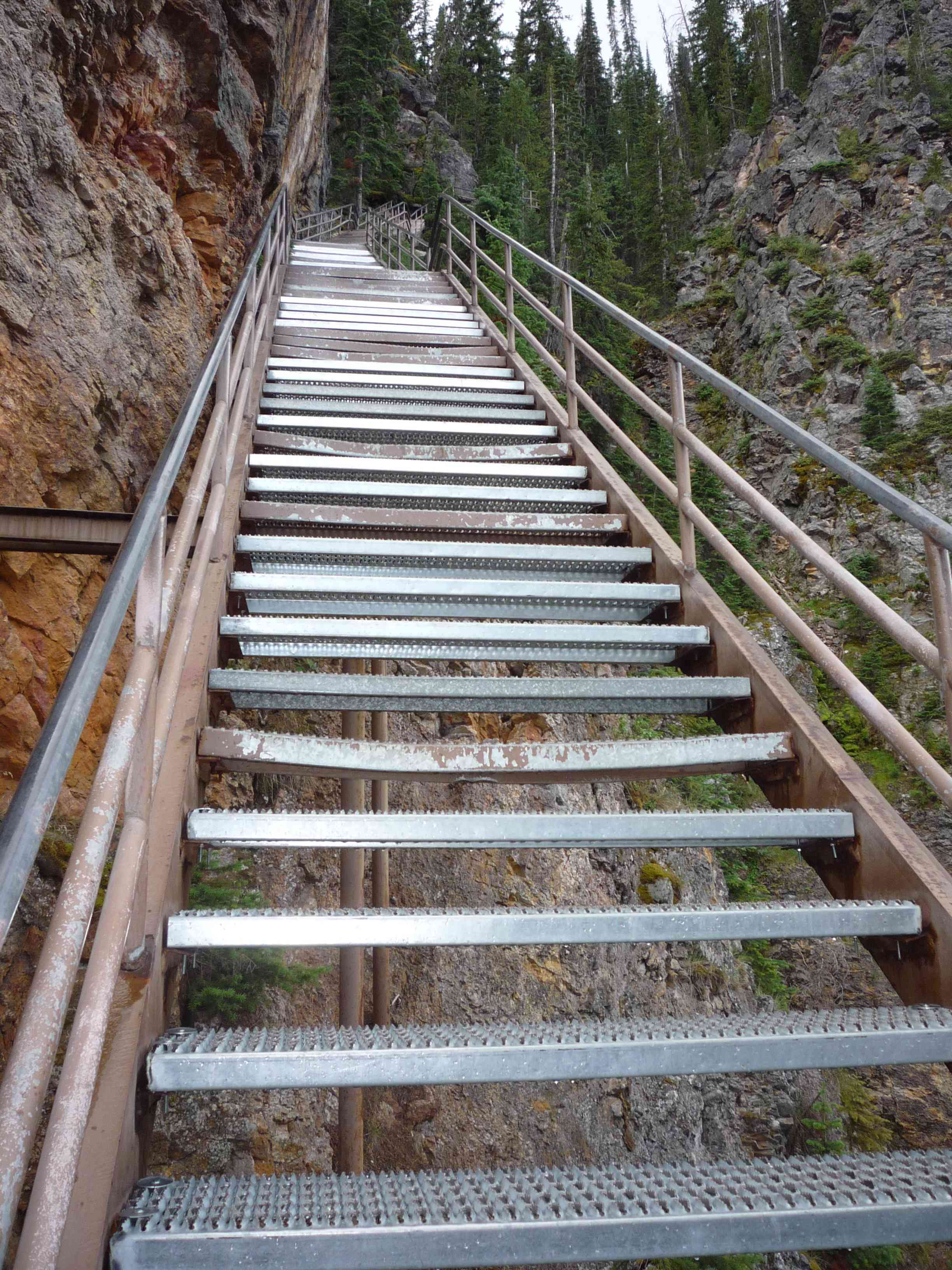
Uncle Tom's Trail, 2010
