= Justin Posey =

Justin Posey may refer to:

- Justin Posey (BMX rider)
- Justin Posey (treasure hunter)
