= Chittenden Memorial Bridge =

Bridge in Yellowstone National Park, US

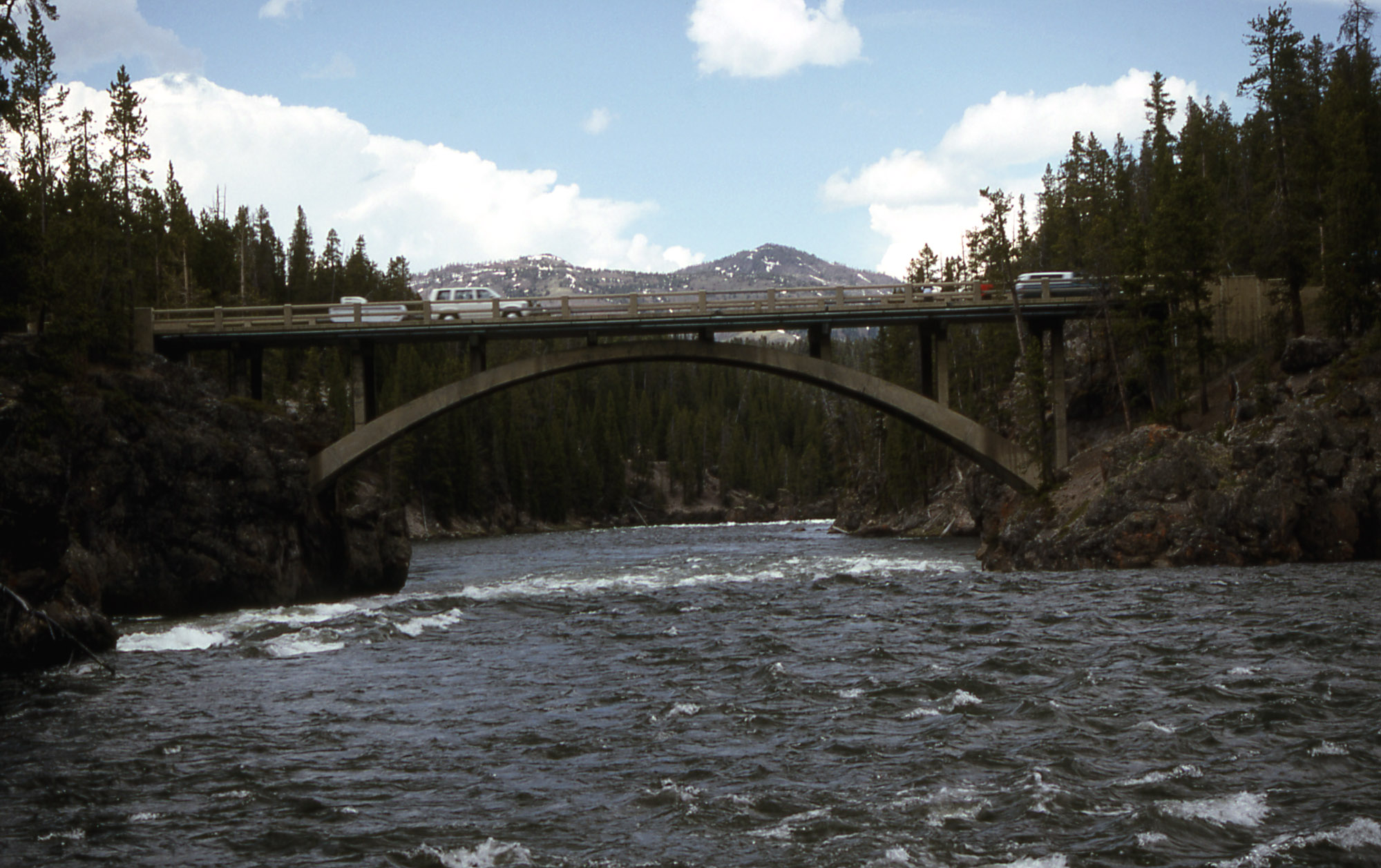
- Chittenden Memorial Bridge, 1994
- Coordinates: 44°42′29″N 110°30′09″W
- Crosses: Yellowstone River
- Official name: Chittenden Memorial Bridge
- Owner: National Park Service

Characteristics
- Design: Melan arch bridge

History
- Engineering design by: Hiram M. Chittenden

Location
- Interactive map of Chittenden Memorial Bridge

The Chittenden Memorial Bridge is a 120 feet (37 m) concrete and steel arch bridge across the Yellowstone River just upstream from the Upper Yellowstone Falls in Yellowstone National Park. First constructed in 1903 as a Melan arch bridge by park engineer Captain Hiram M. Chittenden of the US Army Corps of Engineers, the bridge was known as Chittenden Bridge from 1912 until 1963, when it was replaced with the current structure. This bridge provides road access from the Grand Loop Road to the secondary road on the south rim of the Grand Canyon of the Yellowstone that allows visitors to see the upper and lower Yellowstone Falls from the south rim.

== History ==
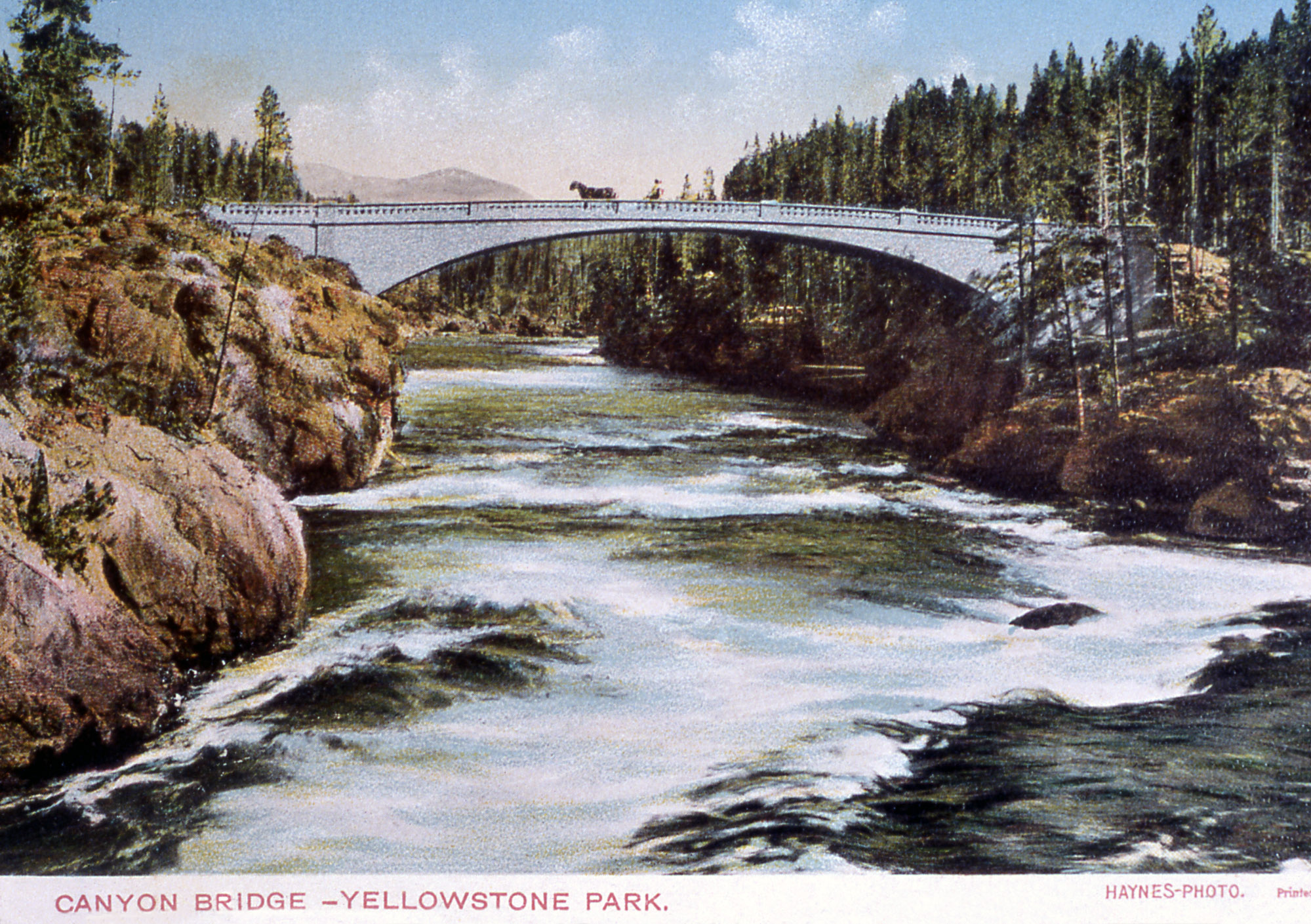
Early postcard of original Chittenden Bridge

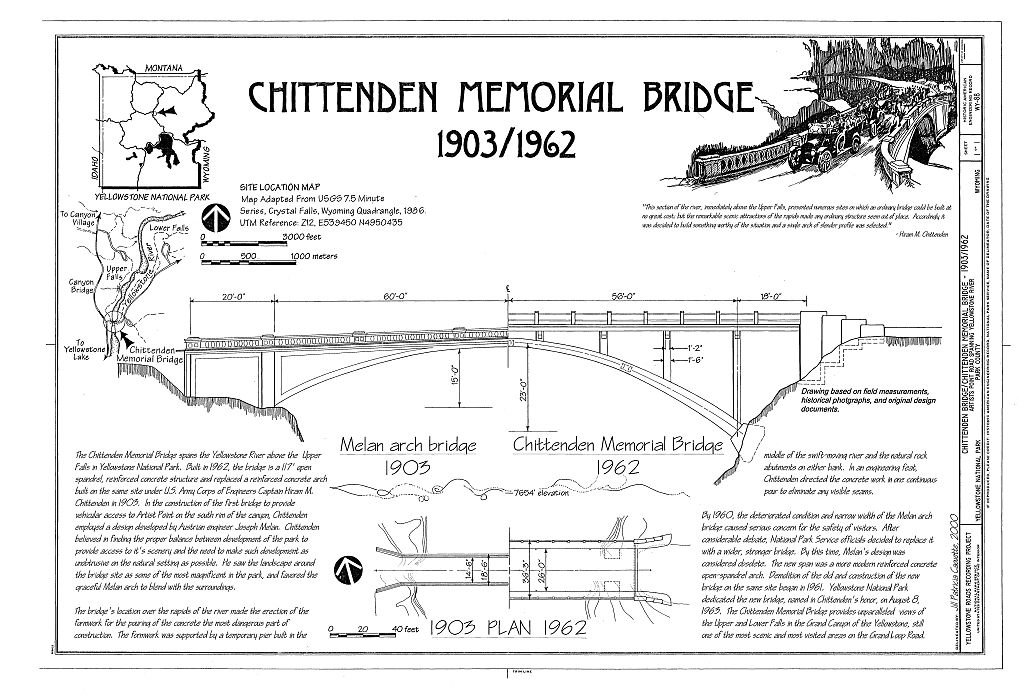
Historic American Engineering Record drawing of original and current bridges

The first bridge on this site was built in 1903. Chittenden describes the process in his 1915 history of Yellowstone:

The Arch Bridge over the Yellowstone. Until 1903 there was no bridge across the Yellowstone in the vicinity of the Falls and the right bank of the Grand Canyon was practically inaccessible to the public. As some of the finest views were to be had from that side (Artist Point, for example, which Moran chose for his painting), it was considered desirable to provide means of getting across. This section of the river, immediately above the Upper Palls, presented numerous sites on which an ordinary bridge could be built at no great cost; but the remarkable scenic attractions of the rapids made any ordinary structure seem out of place. Accordingly it was decided to build something worthy of the situation and a single arch of slender profile was selected as the type of structure. The exact form was a matter of careful study in order to get the lines which would appeal to the eye as meeting the artistic requirements. The span of the bridge is 120 feet and the rise of the arch is 15 feet. The height of the roadway at the center is 43 feet above low water in the river. The abutments are natural rock. The arch contains ten steel girders, which give it great strength. The body of the structure is solid concrete. The forms for the ornamental railing were manufactured in St. Paul, but the railing itself was molded in rich Portland cement mortar in place. The most difficult feature of the work, and the only one involving serious risk, was the building of the false work to support the forms for the concrete while in plastic condition. It was necessary to build a temporary pier in the center of the stream in the swiftest part of the rapids with the Upper Falls of the Yellowstone only a little way below. There would be small chance of escape for any one falling into the stream; but the chance was taken by one man who fell from the work, but, providentially, was caught in an eddy a little way below the bridge site and carried into shallow water near the bank. The concrete work, contrary to usual practice at that time with such large masses, was placed in one continuous operation. This would have been simple enough with a mechanical mixer, but was much more difficult where the mixing was done by hand. Elaborate preparations were made. All the material—gravel, broken rock, sand, cement—was gathered and distributed at convenient points about the site. A date was chosen in full moon in August and a temporary electric lighting plant was installed. A force of 150 men was assembled from the various road crews and divided into three shifts. When all was ready, the concrete mixing was begun and continued without intermission in 8-hour shifts for 74 hours, or until the work was complete.

— Hiram M. Chittenden, Yellowstone Park-Historical and Descriptive, 1915

By 1912, six years after Chittenden left his duties as park engineer, the bridge had become known as the Chittenden Bridge. In 1961, after a lot of public protest, the National Park Service tore down the original bridge and replaced it with a more modern, wider structure suitable for the type of vehicle traffic the park was experiencing. In an opening ceremony in 1963, the new bridge was christened the Chittenden Memorial Bridge.

== See also ==
- List of bridges documented by the Historic American Engineering Record in Wyoming
