= Saul Leiter =

American photographer and painter (1923–2013)

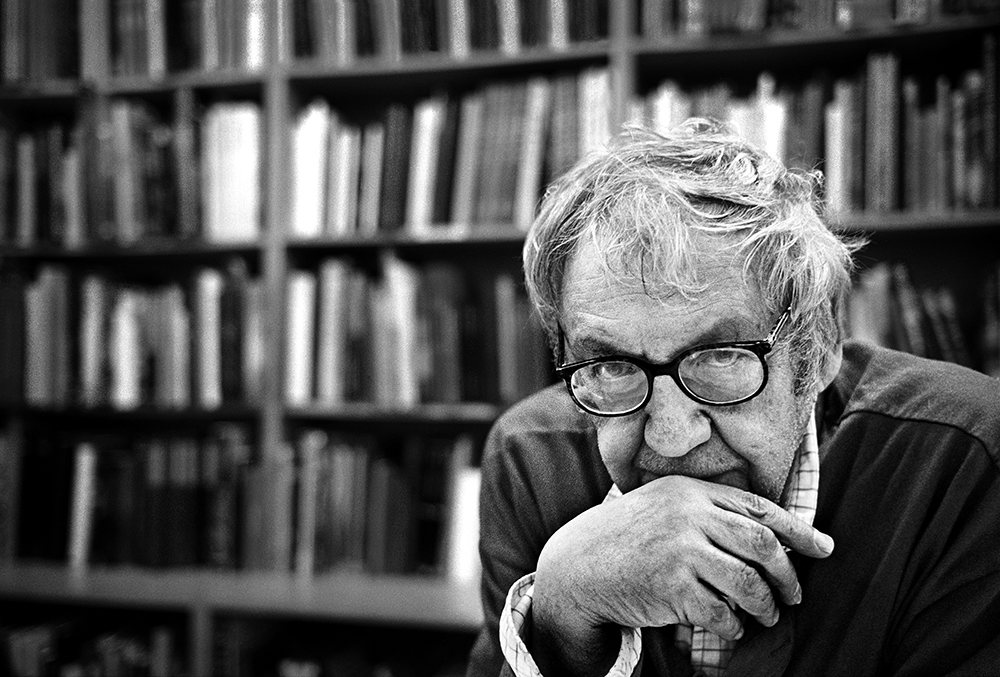
- Leiter in 2008
- Born: December 3, 1923; Pittsburgh, Pennsylvania, US
- Died: November 26, 2013 (aged 89); New York City, US
- Occupations: Photographer and painter

Saul Leiter (December 3, 1923 – November 26, 2013) was an American photographer and painter whose early work in the 1940s and 1950s was an important contribution to what came to be recognized as the New York school of photography.

== Life and work ==
Saul Leiter was born in Pittsburgh, Pennsylvania. His father was a well known Talmud scholar and Saul studied to become a rabbi. His mother gave him his first camera at age 12. At age 23, he left theology school and moved to New York City to become an artist. He had developed an early interest in painting and had met the Abstract Expressionist painter Richard Pousette-Dart.

Pousette-Dart and W. Eugene Smith encouraged Leiter to pursue photography and he was soon taking black and white pictures with a 35 mm Leica, which he acquired in exchange for a few Eugene Smith prints. In 1948, he started taking color photographs. He began associating with other contemporary photographers, such as Robert Frank and Diane Arbus, and helped form what Jane Livingston has termed the New York School of photographers in the 1940s and 1950s.

Beginning in the early 1960s, Leiter worked as a fashion photographer for the next 20 years and was published in Show, Elle, British Vogue, Queen, and Nova. In the late 1950s the art director Henry Wolf published Leiter's color fashion work in Esquire and later in Harper's Bazaar.

After separating from his wife Barbara Hatch in 1959, Leiter entered into a relationship with the model and painter Soames Bantry, who was his muse and partner until Soames' death in 2002. In the early 1960s, she moved into Leiter's apartment building on East Tenth Street, where they had separate studios. At times, both were struggling financially, and they couldn't pay their rent.

Edward Steichen included Leiter's black and white photographs in the 1953 exhibition Always the Young Stranger at the Museum of Modern Art. Leiter's work is featured prominently in Jane Livingston's book The New York School (1992) and in Martin Harrison's Appearances: Fashion Photography since 1945 (1991). In 2008, The Henri Cartier-Bresson Foundation in Paris held Leiter's first museum exhibition in Europe with an accompanying catalog.

Leiter is the subject of a 2012 feature-length documentary In No Great Hurry - 13 Lessons in Life with Saul Leiter, directed and produced by Tomas Leach. Leiter is a featured subject, among others, in the documentary film Tracing Outlines (2015) by 2nd State Productions.

Martin Harrison, editor and author of Saul Leiter Early Color (2006), writes, "Leiter's sensibility set his photographs apart from some of the defining characteristics of the putative 'New York School' – as typified by the visceral encounters with the pulse and anxieties of street life familiar from the 1950s imagery of photographers such as Robert Frank and William Klein. Leiter, by contrast, operated on a more reflective, less overtly confrontational mode, seeking out tranquility in the Manhattan maelstrom."

Leiter died on November 26, 2013, aged 89. in New York City.

== Publications ==
- Early Color. Introduction by Martin Harrison.
  - Göttingen: Steidl, 2006. ISBN 978-3865211392.
  - Göttingen: Steidl, 2013. ISBN 978-3869303529.
- Saul Leiter.
  - Paris: Delpire, 2007. Photo Poche series.
  - London: Thames & Hudson, 2008. ISBN 978-0500410974. Photofile series.
- Early Black and White.
  - Göttingen: Steidl, 2008.
  - Göttingen: Steidl; Howard Greenberg Gallery, 2014. ISBN 978-3865214133. Two volumes, boxed edition. By Max Kozloff, edited by Howard Greenberg and Bob Shamis with the assistance of Margit Erb, with an additional essay by Jane Livingston.
- Saul Leiter. Göttingen: Steidl, 2008. ISBN 9783865216625. Preface by Agnès Sire.
- Photographs and Works on Paper. Antwerp: Fifty One Publication, 2011. ISBN 9789081772501. Exhibition Catalogue.
- Saul Leiter Retrospektive. Hamburg: Kehrer Verlag, 2012. ISBN 978-3-86828-258-0
- Here's more, why not?. Antwerp: Fifty One Publication, 2013. ISBN 978-9081772518.
- Painted Nudes. London: Sylph, 2015. ISBN 978-1909631069.
- All About Saul Leiter. Seigensha, 2017. Catalogue published to accompany an exhibition at the Bunkamura Museum of Art, Tokyo, 2017. Captions in English and Japanese. ISBN 978-4861526169
  - London: Thames & Hudson, 2018. ISBN 978-0500294536
- In My Room. Göttingen; Steidl, 2018. ISBN 978-3958291034
- Women. Tokyo: Space Shower, 2018. ISBN 9784909087157. Mostly photographs, some paintings.
- East 10th Street. Antwerp: Fifty One Publication, 2019. ISBN 978-9463883207
- Forever Saul Leiter. London: Thames & Hudson, 2022. ISBN 978-0500296431
- The Unseen Saul Leiter. London: Thames & Hudson, 2022. ISBN 9780500545560. Previously unseen slides from Leiter archive, curated by Erb & Parillo.

== Filmography ==
- In No Great Hurry: 13 Lessons in Life with Saul Leiter (2013) – documentary about Leiter directed and produced by Tomas Leach; 75 mins

== Solo exhibitions ==
- 1944: Ten Thirty Gallery, Cleveland
- 1945: The Outlines Gallery, Pittsburgh
- 1947: Butler Institute of American Art, Youngstown, OH
- 1950s: Tanager Gallery, New York
- 1954: Emerging Talent. Curated by Clement Greenberg. Samuel Koontz Gallery, New York.
- 1972: Midtown Y, New York
- 1984: Gallery Lafayette, New York
- 1985: Gallery Lafayette, New York
- 1993: Howard Greenberg Gallery, New York
- 1994: Howard Greenberg Gallery, New York
- 1997: Saul Leiter, In Color. Martha Schneider Gallery, Chicago
- 1997: Saul Leiter, In Color. Howard Greenberg Gallery, New York
- 2004: Saul Leiter, In Color. Staton Greenberg Gallery, Santa Barbara
- 2005: Saul Leiter, Early Color. Howard Greenberg Gallery, New York
- 2006: The Fashion Photographs of Saul Leiter, Festival of Fashion Photography, Hyères, France
- 2006: Saul Leiter, Color, Fifty One Fine Art Photography, Antwerp
- 2006: In Living Color, Photographs by Saul Leiter, Milwaukee Art Museum
- 2007: Saul Leiter, Early Color, University of Maine Museum of Art, Bangor
- 2008: Saul Leiter, Galerie Camera Obscura, Paris
- 2008: Saul Leiter, Faggionato Fine Arts, London
- 2008: Saul Leiter, Howard Greenberg Gallery, New York
- 2008: Saul Leiter, Jackson Fine Art, Atlanta
- 2008: Saul Leiter, Galleria C arla Sozzani, Milan
- 2008: Saul Leiter, Foundation Henri Cartier-Bresson, Paris
- 2009: Saul Leiter, Fifty One Fine Art Photography, Antwerp
- 2010: Saul Leiter, Mois de la Foto, Paris
- 2011: Saul Leiter, New York Reflections, Jewish Historical Museum, Amsterdam
- 2011: Saul Leiter, Early Color, Musée de l'Elysée, Lausanne
- 2011: Saul Leiter, Photographs and works on paper, Fifty One Fine Art Photography, Antwerp
- 2012: Saul Leiter, Retrospective, Deichtorhallen Hamburg
- 2013: Saul Leiter, Here's more, why not, Fifty One Fine Art Photography, Antwerp
- 2013: Saul Leiter, Black & white, Fifty One Fine Art Photography, Antwerp
- 2013: Saul Leiter, Kunst Haus Wien
- 2015: Homage to Saul Leiter, Fifty One gallery, Antwerp
- 2024: Saul Leiter: An Unfinished World, MK Gallery, Milton Keynes
- 2024: Saul Leiter: Centennial, Howard Greenberg Gallery

== Collections ==
Leiter's work is held in the following public collections:

- Addison Gallery of American Art
- The Albertina Museum, Vienna
- Amon Carter Museum, Fort Worth
- Art Institute of Chicago
- Baltimore Museum of Art, Baltimore
- Milwaukee Art Museum
- Museum of Fine Arts, Boston
- Museum of Fine Arts, Houston
- Museum of Modern Art, New York
- National Gallery of Art, Washington, D.C.
- St. Louis Art Museum, St. Louis
- Staatliche Museen Zu Berlin
- Victoria & Albert Museum, London
- Whitney Museum of American Arts, New York
