= In No Great Hurry: 13 Lessons in Life with Saul Leiter =

2013 documentary film

- Theatrical poster
- Directed by: Tomas Leach
- Produced by: Tomas Leach
- Cinematography: Tomas Leach
- Edited by: Kate Baird, Johnny Raynor
- Music by: Mark Rustemier
- Distributed by: Zeitgeist Films
- Release date: January 11, 2013
- Running time: 75 minutes
- Countries: United Kingdom, United States
- Language: English

In No Great Hurry: 13 Lessons in Life with Saul Leiter is a 2013 documentary film about the photographer Saul Leiter directed and produced by Tomas Leach.

Leiter was an early pioneer of color street photography. His most personal work was largely ignored until the release of Early Color in 2006. Interest in his work exploded in the last years of his life, and since his death in 2013. The film documents Leiter in his chaotic home in New York City, as he looks back on his life and work.

Leach contacted Leiter after seeing his work in Early Color. He met with Leiter in New York and spent a year persuading the photographer that there needed to be a film about him. Filming took place over 2010 and 2011, and the film was edited in 2012. Leiter saw an edit of the film before he died.

The film was released in the UK in the summer of 2013, the USA in January 2014. It was released in Japan in December 2015 .
