= Tomas Leach =

British filmmaker and cinematographer

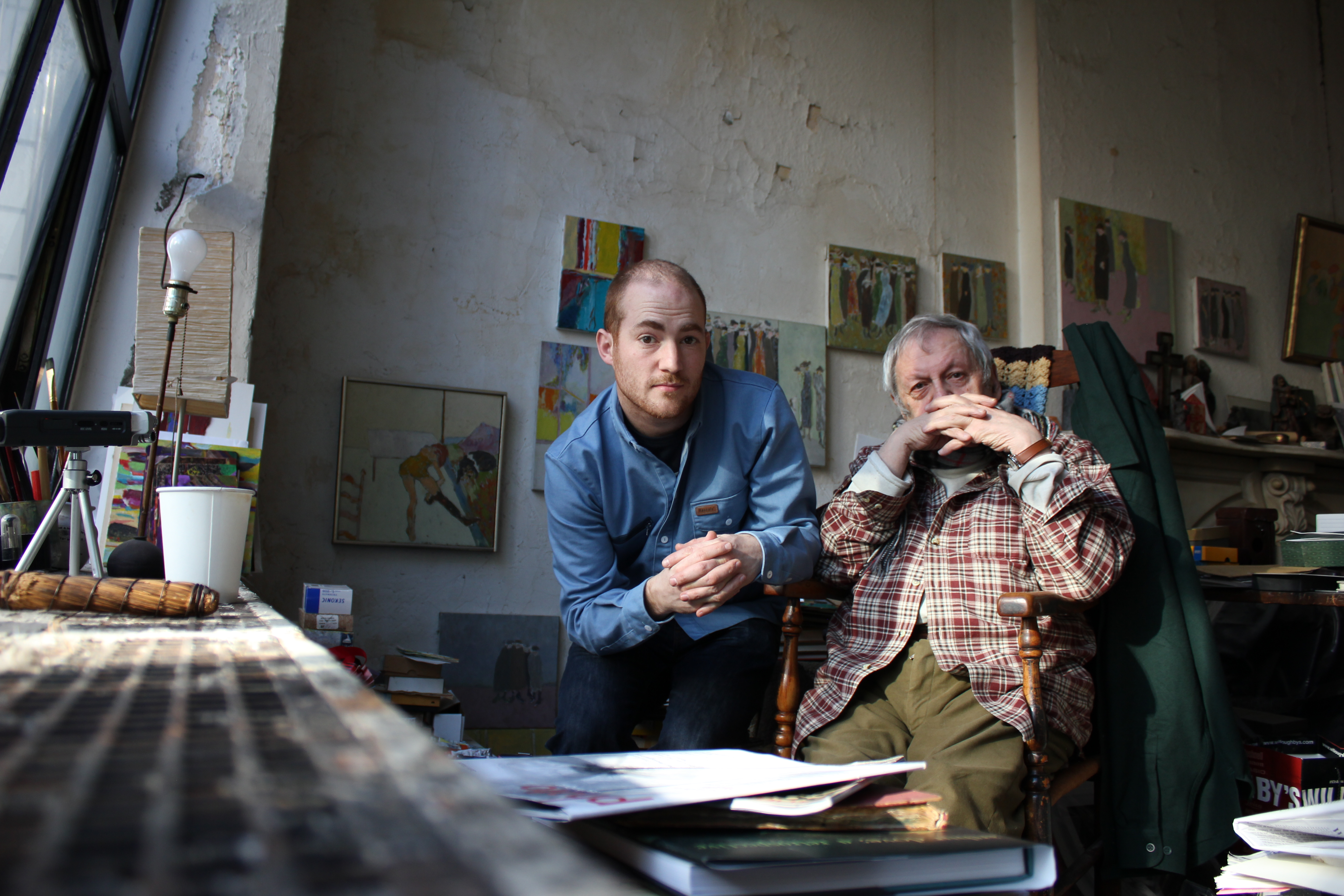
- Leach with Saul Leiter
- Born: Exeter, England
- Education: Arts University Bournemouth; Fabrica Research Centre
- Occupation: Documentary filmmaker

Tomas Leach is a British filmmaker and cinematographer known for his work on documentary features.

== Early life ==
Leach was born in Exeter, England. He studied at the Arts University Bournemouth before taking a scholarship at the Fabrica Research Centre.

== Career ==
After directing short documentaries and commercials, Leach directed his first feature documentary In No Great Hurry: 13 Lessons in Life with Saul Leiter (2013) about photographer Saul Leiter. It made the Seattle Times top ten list of 2014.

In 2016 he directed The Lure, a feature documentary about the hunt for Forrest Fenn's treasure.

In 2017 he directed Through the Darkness, a film about the baseball team at San Quentin Prison for the series Religion of Sports. The film was executive produced by Tom Brady, Michael Strahan and Gotham Chopra.

His short film, Alba: Not Everyone Will Be Taken Into the Future, premiered at the Reykjavik Film Festival in 2018.

== Filmography ==
Year	Title	Notes
2013	In No Great Hurry: 13 Lessons in Life with Saul Leiter	Also cinematographer
2014	Delay	Short
2016	The Lure	
2017	Bonnie Prince Billy: Treasure Map	Music video
2017	Religion of Sports	TV series episode
2018	Alba: Not Everyone Will Be Taken Into the Future	Short
2019	The Day Ray Impaled Himself on the Fence	Short
