= Justin Posey (treasure hunter) =

American software engineer, and treasure hunter

- Born: 1982 or 1983 (age 42–43)
- Website: treasure.quest

Justin Posey is an American treasure hunter. He searched for and hid some contents of the Fenn treasure as part of another treasure hunt.

== Early life and career ==
Posey was raised in Arizona in the 1990s. He works as a software engineer, and art and antique dealer.

== Treasure hunting ==
Posey gained prominence in the treasure-hunting community through his pursuit of the Fenn treasure, a chest hidden by art dealer Forrest Fenn. After the Fenn treasure was found, Posey acquired some of its contents and created his own treasure hunt, "Beyond the Map's Edge", launched in 2025.

== See also ==
- List of treasure hunters
