= Yellowstone Falls =

2 waterfalls in Yellowstone National Park, Wyoming

Upper Falls of the Yellowstone River
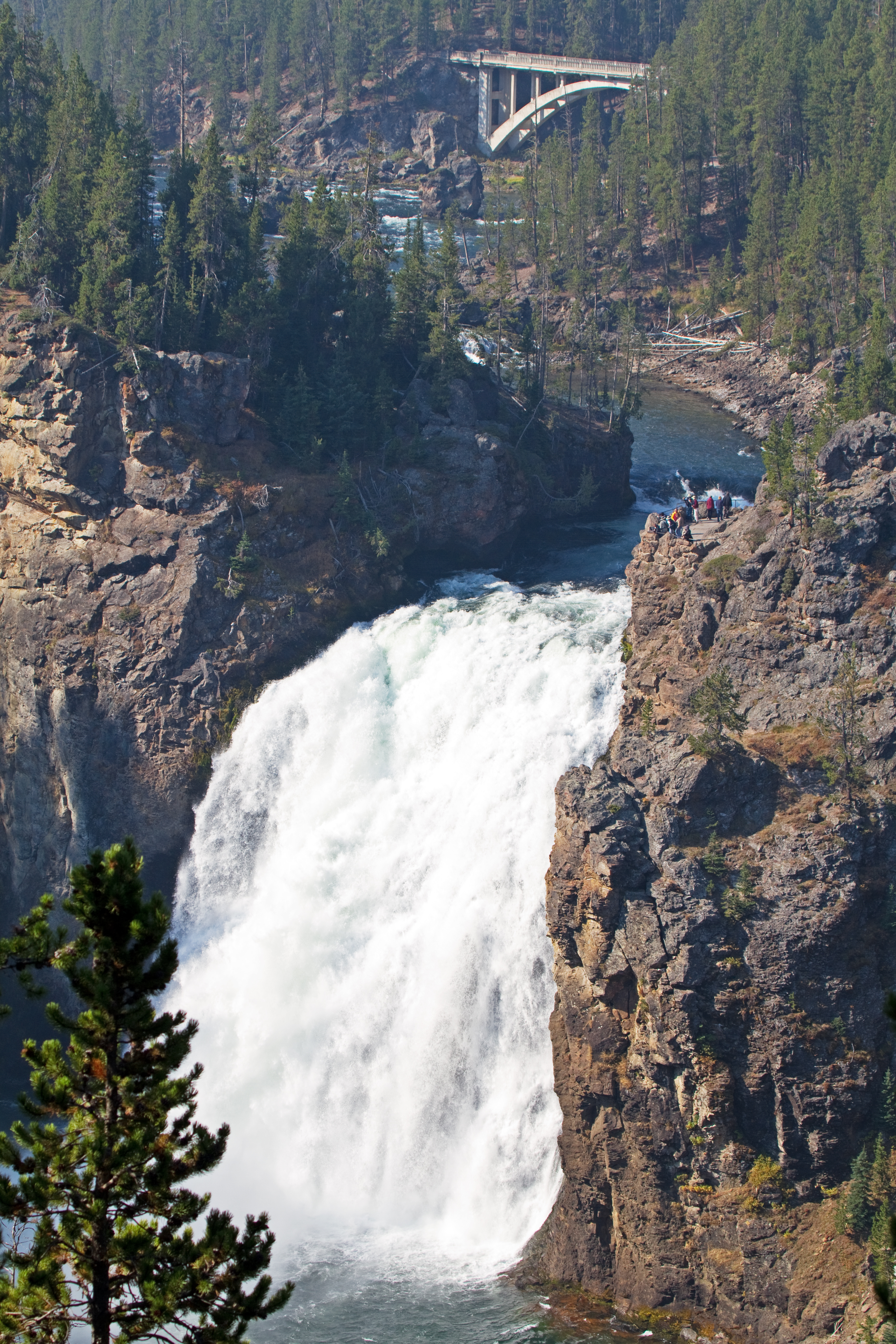
- Interactive map of Upper Falls of the Yellowstone River
- Location: Yellowstone National Park, Park County, Wyoming, United States
- Coordinates: 44°42′46″N 110°29′59″W
- Total height: 109 feet (33 m)
- Watercourse: Yellowstone River

Lower Falls of the Yellowstone River
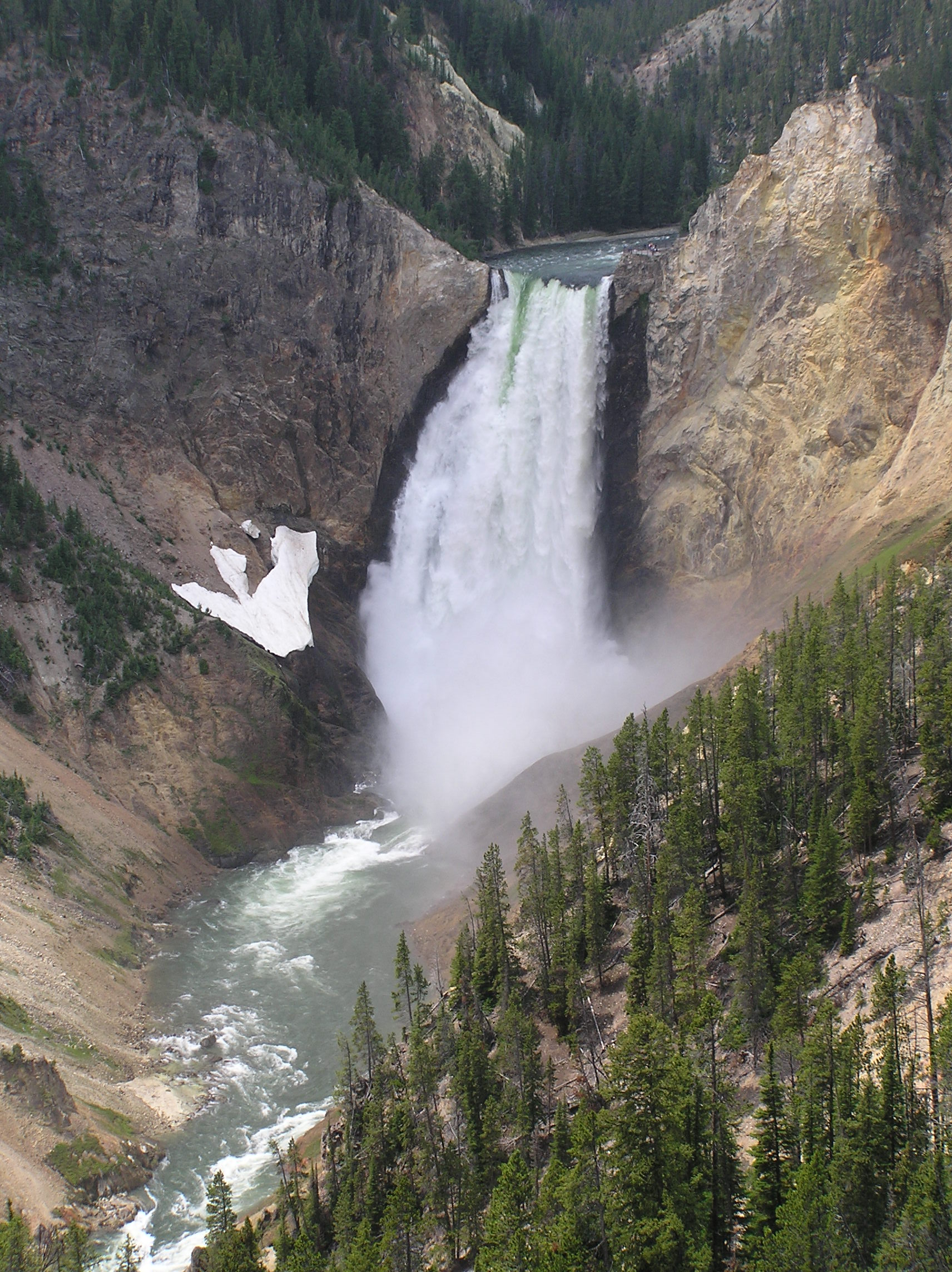
- Interactive map of Lower Falls of the Yellowstone River
- Location: Yellowstone National Park
- Coordinates: 44°43′05″N 110°29′46″W
- Total height: 308 feet (94 m)
- Watercourse: Yellowstone River

Yellowstone Falls consist of two major waterfalls on the Yellowstone River, within Yellowstone National Park, Wyoming, United States. As the Yellowstone river flows north from Yellowstone Lake, it leaves the Hayden Valley and plunges first over Upper Falls of the Yellowstone River and then one-quarter mile (400 m) downstream over Lower Falls of the Yellowstone River, at which point it then enters the Grand Canyon of the Yellowstone, which is up to 1,000 feet (300 m) deep.

== Upper Falls ==
The Upper Falls of the Yellowstone River (44°42′46″N 110°29′59″W) are 109 feet (33 m) high. The brink of Upper Falls marks the junction between a hard rhyolite lava flow and weaker glassy lava that has been more heavily eroded.

== Lower Falls ==
Cascading from the 590,000 year old Canyon Rhyolite lava flow, Lower Falls of the Yellowstone River is the largest volume waterfall in the Rocky Mountains of the United States. These falls (44°43′05″N 110°29′46″W) are 308 feet (94 m) high, or nearly twice as high as Niagara Falls. The volume of water flowing over Lower Falls can vary from 680 cu ft/s (19 m^{3}/s) in the autumn, to 8,400 cu ft/s (240 m^{3}/s) at peak runoff in late springtime. The flow rate of Lower Falls is much less than that of Niagara Falls, as the Yellowstone River is only 70 feet (21 m) wide at the point at the brink, whereas the Niagara River is 2,600 feet (790 m) in width as it approaches the crest line of Horseshoe Falls.

== History ==
It is likely that Native American tribes knew of the falls for centuries. Captain William Clark of the Lewis and Clark Expedition made a note in his journal about hearing of the falls but did not believe the story. The first European to see the falls was likely French fur trapper Baptise Ducharme who claimed to see the falls in 1824, 1826 and 1839. Jim Bridger and fellow explorer James Gremmell claimed they visited the falls in 1846. In 1851, Bridger provided missionary Father Pierre-Jean De Smet a map showing the location of the falls. The Cook–Folsom–Peterson Expedition, a private group of three explorers named the falls in 1869. The earliest images of the falls were drawn by Private Charles Moore, a member of the U.S. Army escort of the Washburn-Langford-Doane Expedition which explored the Yellowstone River in August–September 1870. During the Hayden Expedition of 1871, the falls were documented in photographs by William Henry Jackson and later in paintings by Thomas Moran. In January 1887, Frank Jay Haynes took the first winter photographs of Lower Falls.

Over the years the estimates of the height of Lower Falls has varied dramatically. In 1851 Jim Bridger estimated its height at 250 feet. One outrageous newspaper story from 1867 placed its height at "thousands of feet". A map from 1869 gives the falls its current name of Lower Falls for the first time and estimates the height at 350 feet. However the current map lists Lower Falls at a height of 308 feet.

== Viewing the falls ==
Today, there are numerous vantage points for viewing the falls. The Canyon loop road skirts north rim of the canyon with several vehicle parking areas. One trail leads down to the Brink of Lower Falls, a steep one-third of a mile (540 m). Uncle Tom's Trail descends from the east down a series of stairs attached to the cliffs. As of 2022 it was closed.

The Lower Falls area is located just to the south and east of Canyon Village in Yellowstone National Park. A one-way loop drive starting south from Canyon Junction takes one to the brink of the Grand Canyon of the Yellowstone and offers four viewpoints, with the first stop at the trail that leads to the top of the Lower Falls. The one-way drive continues east and north past the other viewpoints, rejoining the main Grand Loop road from the east at Canyon Junction once more.

== Image gallery ==
Video of Yellowstone Lower Falls, 2019

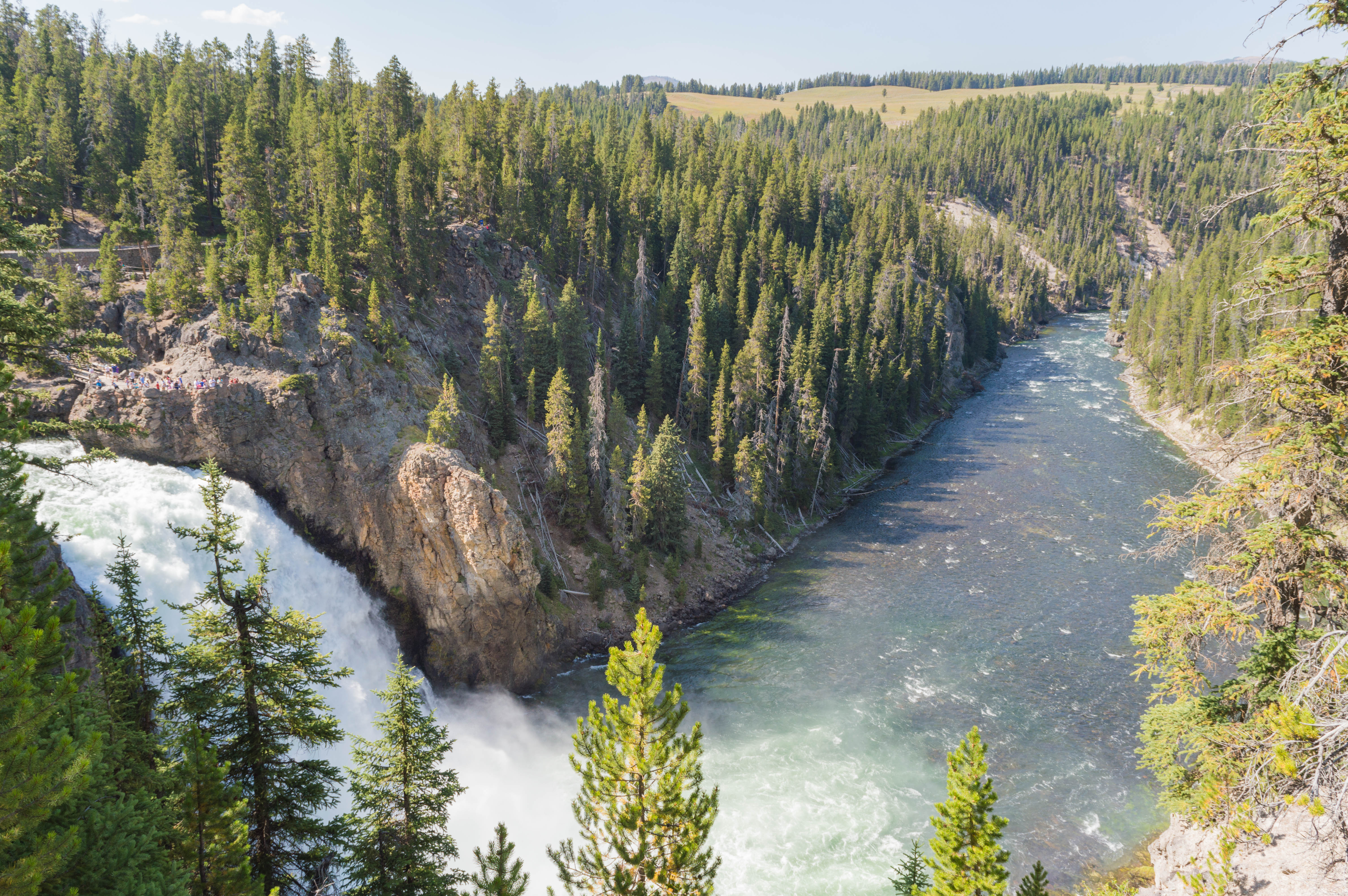
Upper Falls and downstream view

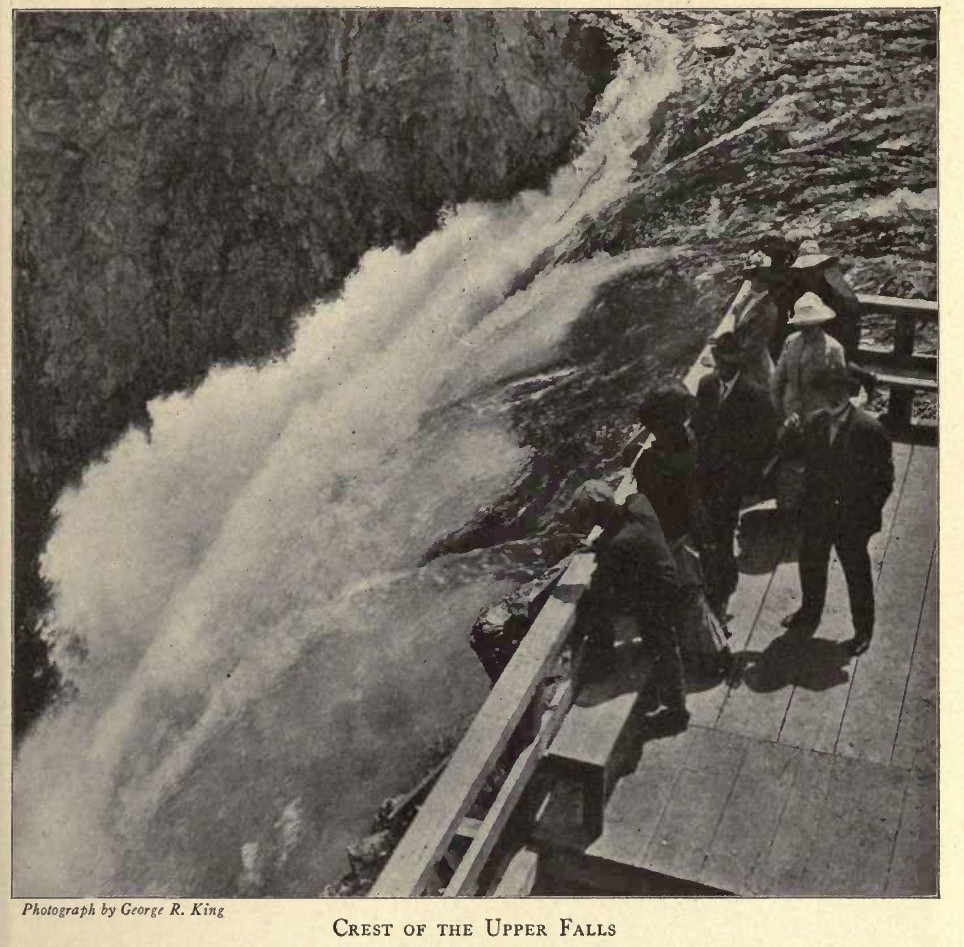
Brink of Upper Falls, 1916

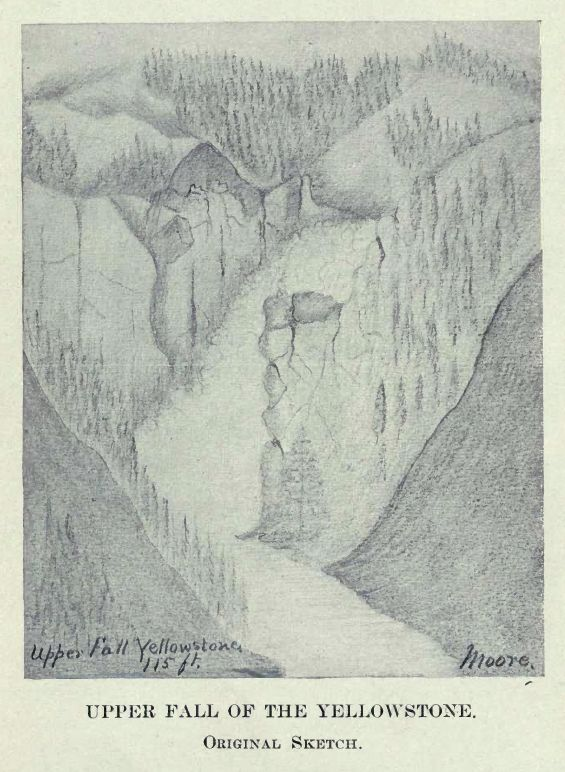
Upper Falls by Private Moore, 1870

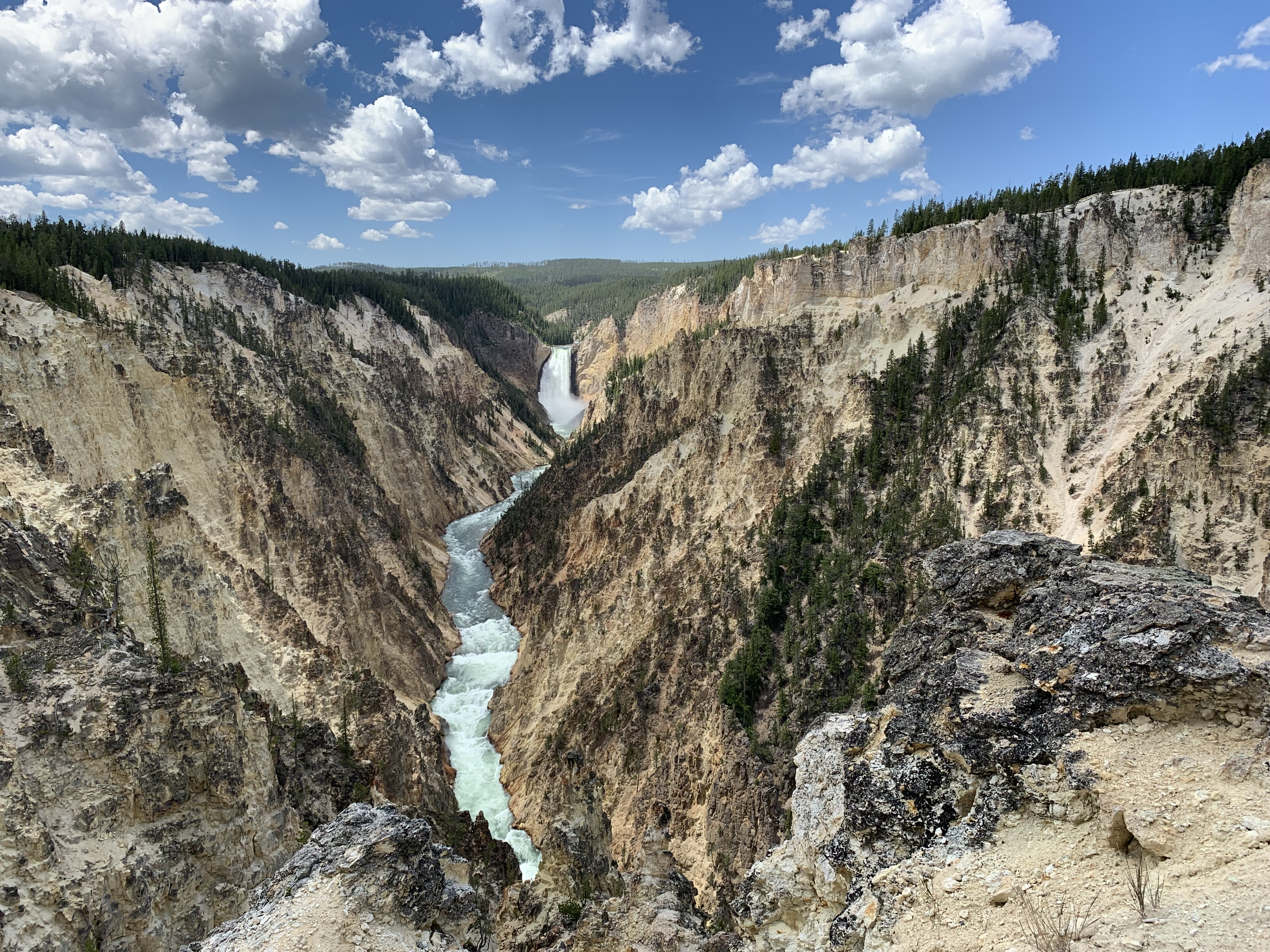
Lower Falls in Grand Canyon of Yellow Stone from Artist Point

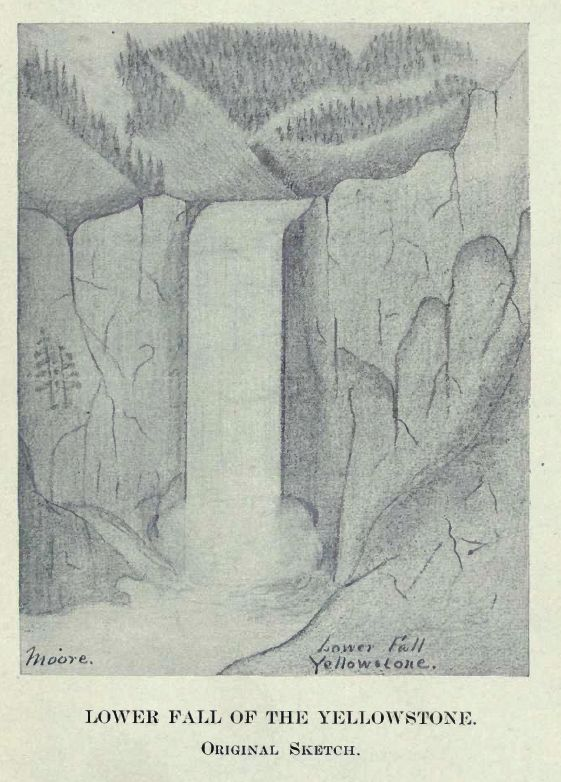
Lower Falls by Private Moore, 1870

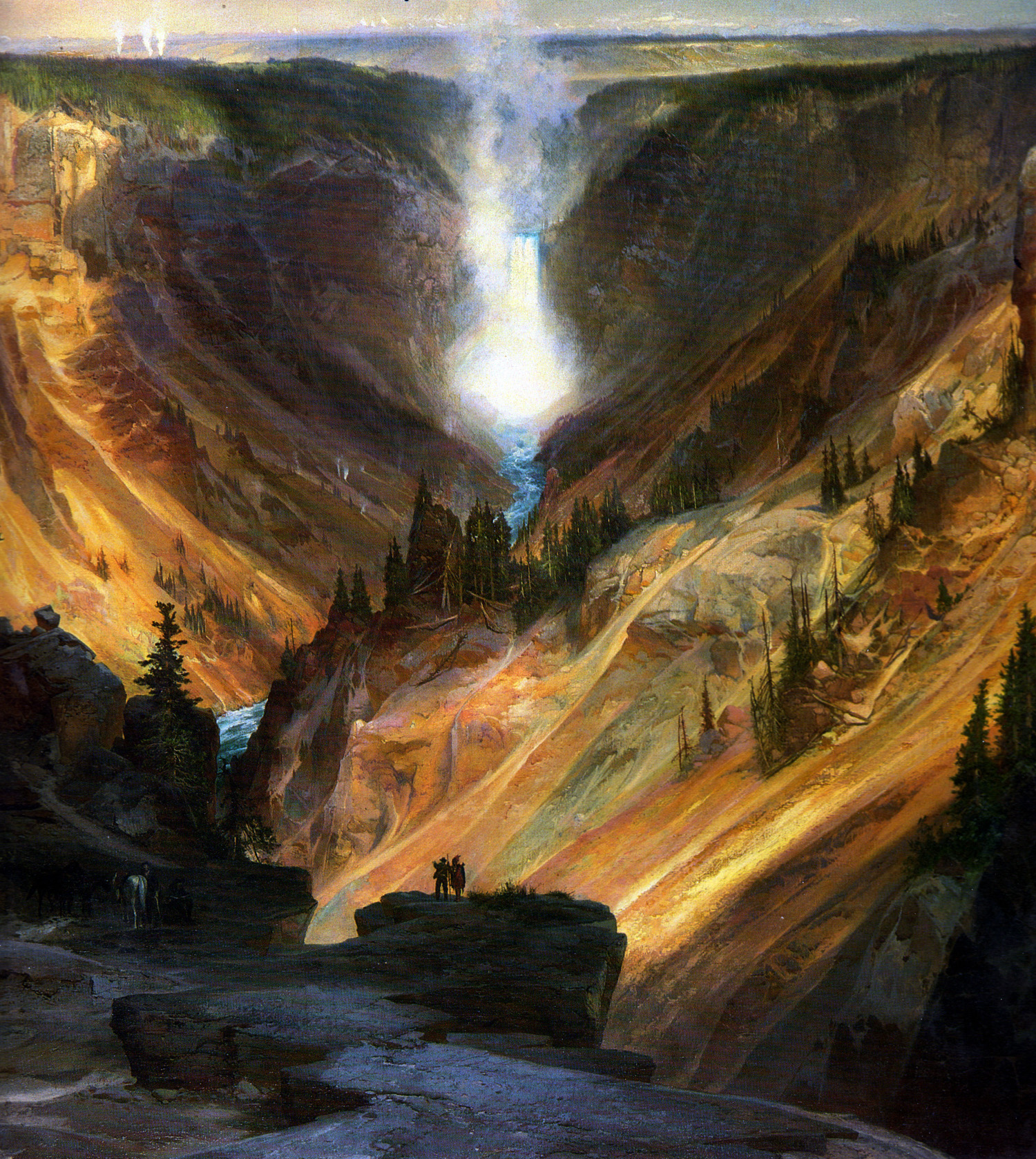
Lower Falls by Thomas Moran, 1871

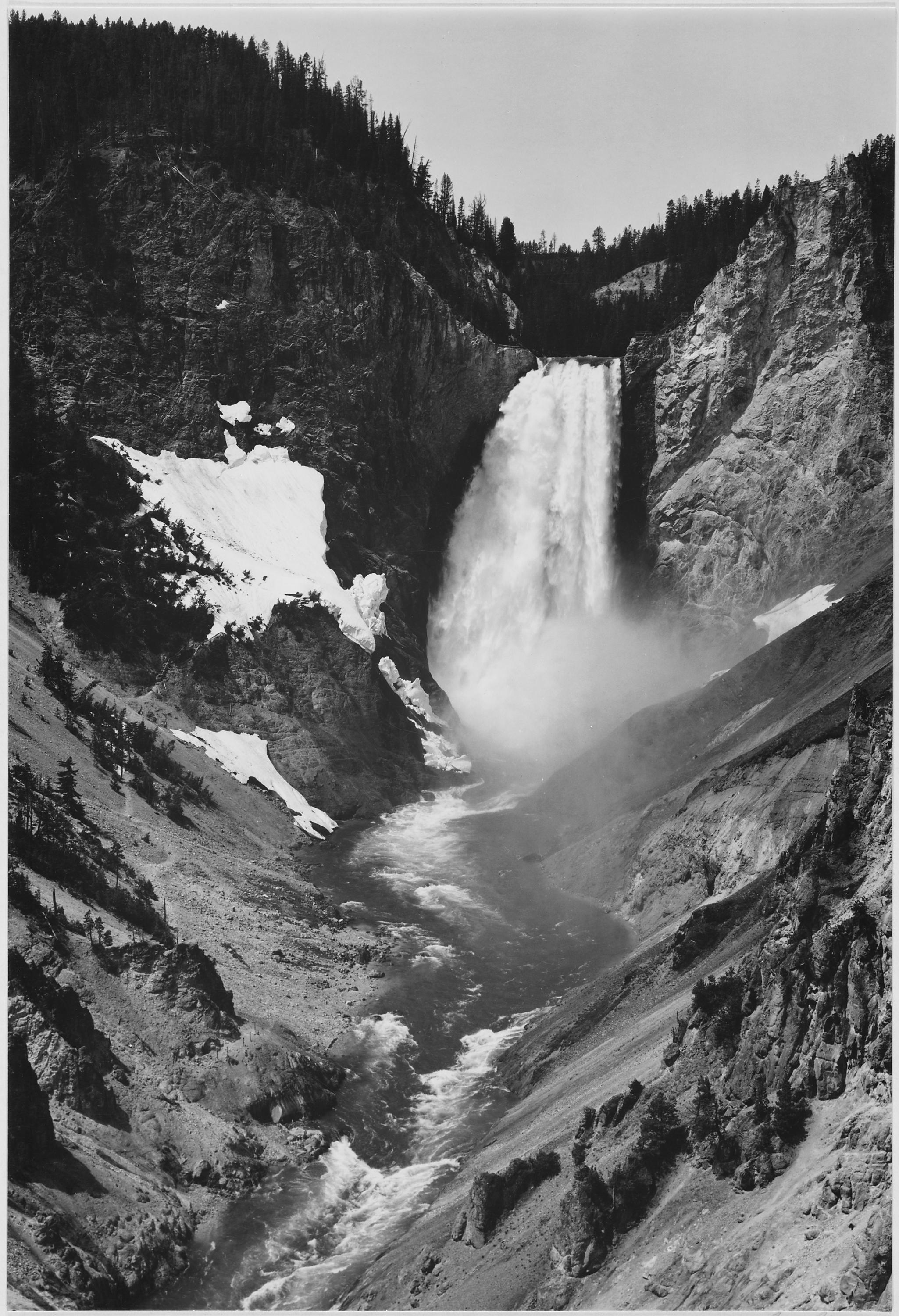
Lower Falls by Ansel Adams, 1941

Video of the brink of the Lower Falls, 2010

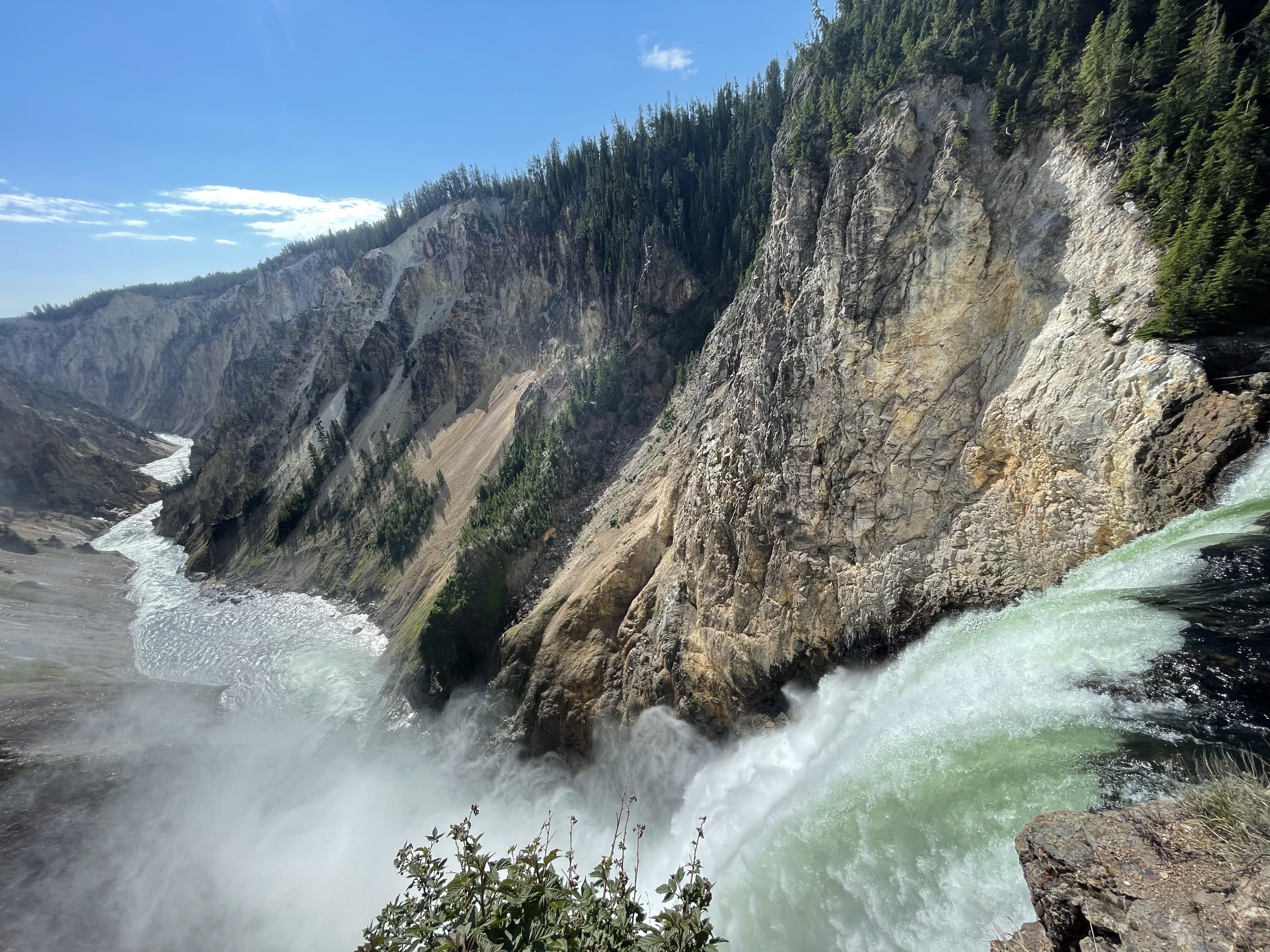
Brink of the Lower Falls, 2021
Lower Falls from Lookout Point, 2026

== See also ==
- List of waterfalls
- List of waterfalls in Yellowstone National Park

== Notes ==
- "Yellowstone Waterfalls". Archived from the original on 2004-06-11.
- "Yellowstone National Park - The Canyon Through Time". Archived from the original on 2010-05-02.
