= Grand Canyon of the Yellowstone =

Canyon on the Yellowstone River

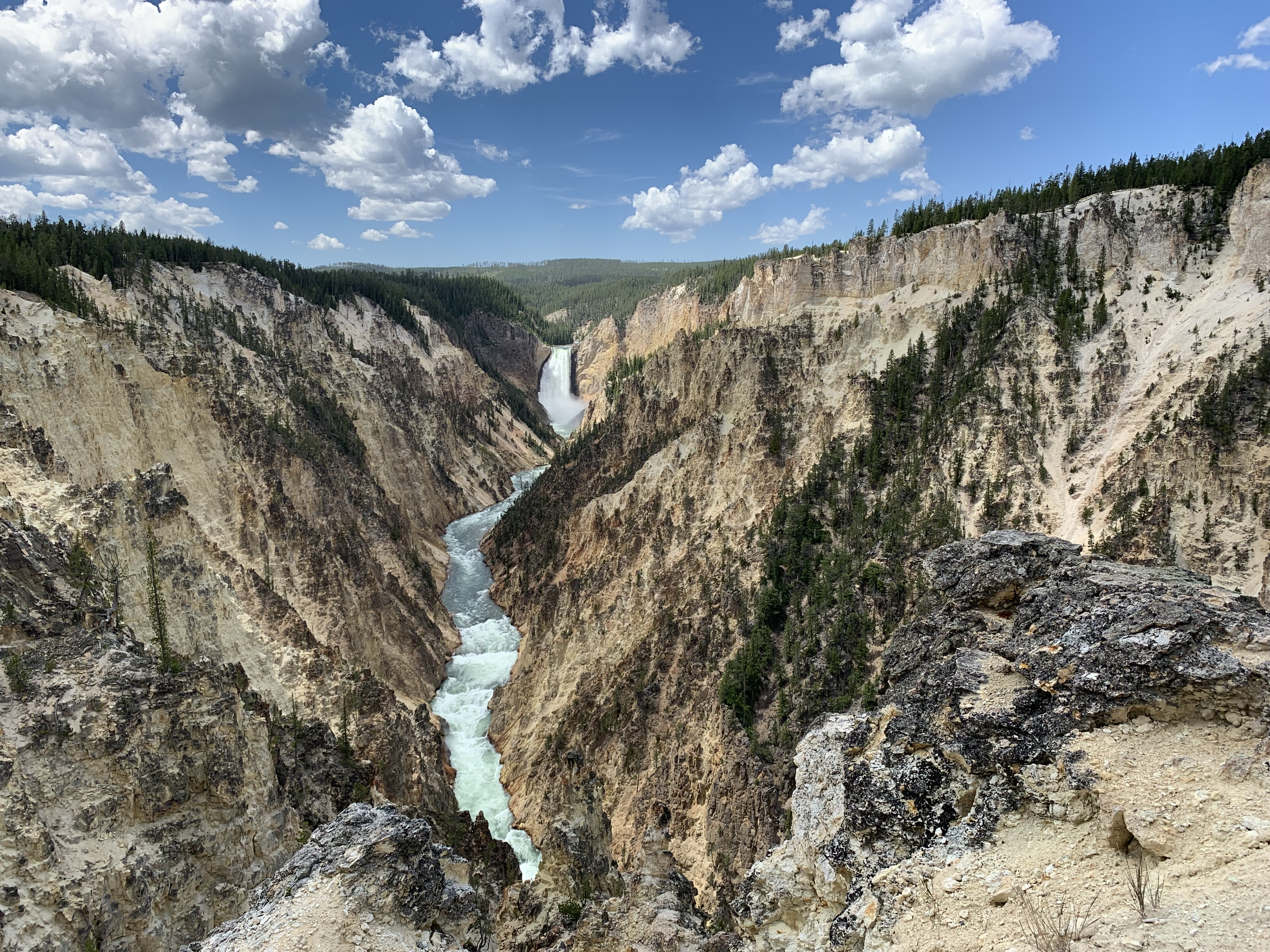
- Grand Canyon of the Yellowstone and Lower Falls

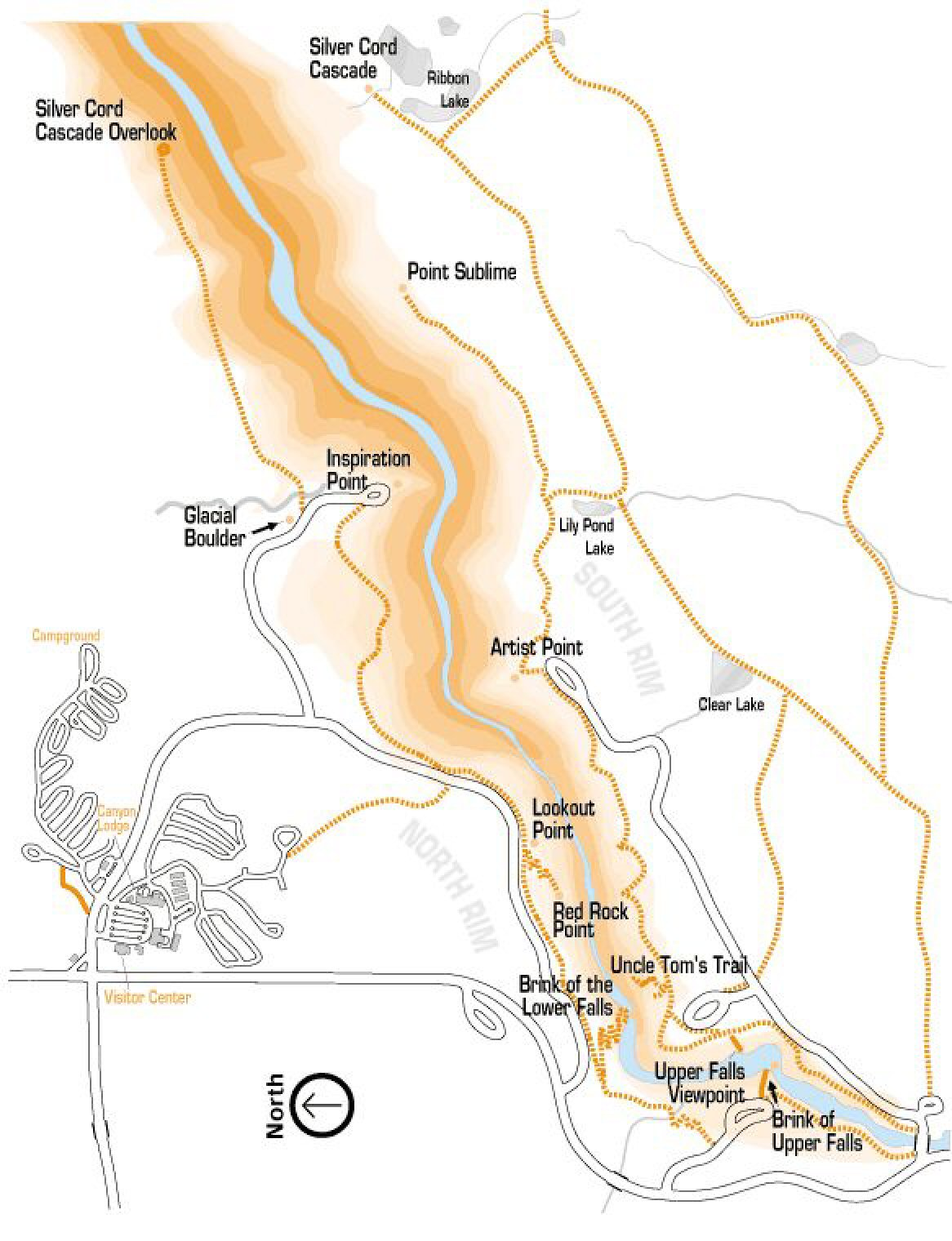
- Map of upper canyon
- Floor elevation: 5,998 ft (1,828 m)
- Length: 20 mi (32 km)
- Width: 1,500–4,000 ft (500–1,200 m)
- Depth: >1,000 ft (300 m)

Geography
- Location: Canyon, Yellowstone National Park, Wyoming
- Coordinates: 44°46′40″N 110°21′49″W

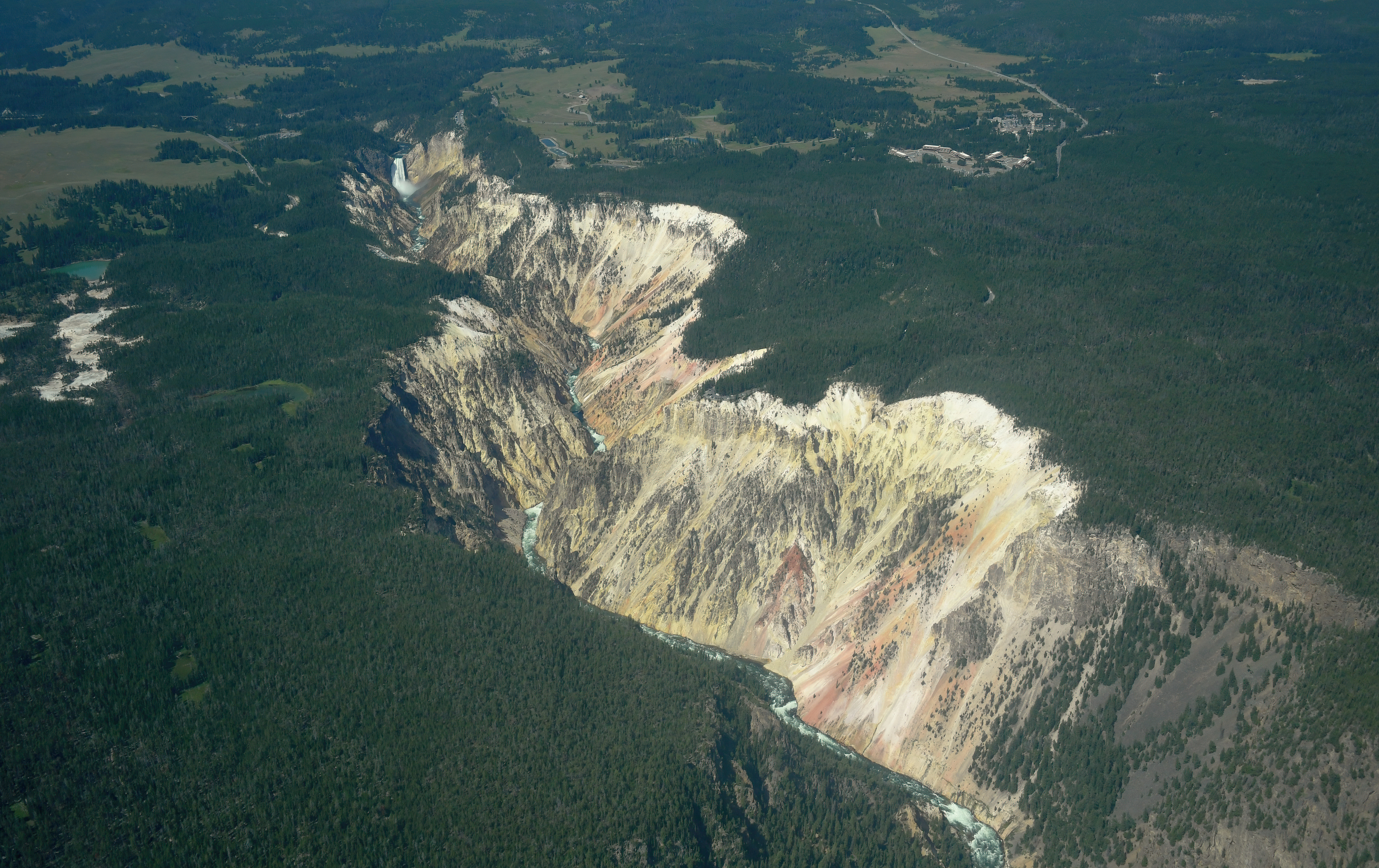
Aerial view of the Grand Canyon of the Yellowstone from the east

The Grand Canyon of the Yellowstone is the first large canyon on the Yellowstone River downstream from Yellowstone Falls in Yellowstone National Park in Wyoming. The canyon is about 24 miles (39 km) long, 800 to 1,200 ft (240 to 370 m) deep, and 0.25 to 0.75 mi (0.40 to 1.21 km) wide.

== History ==
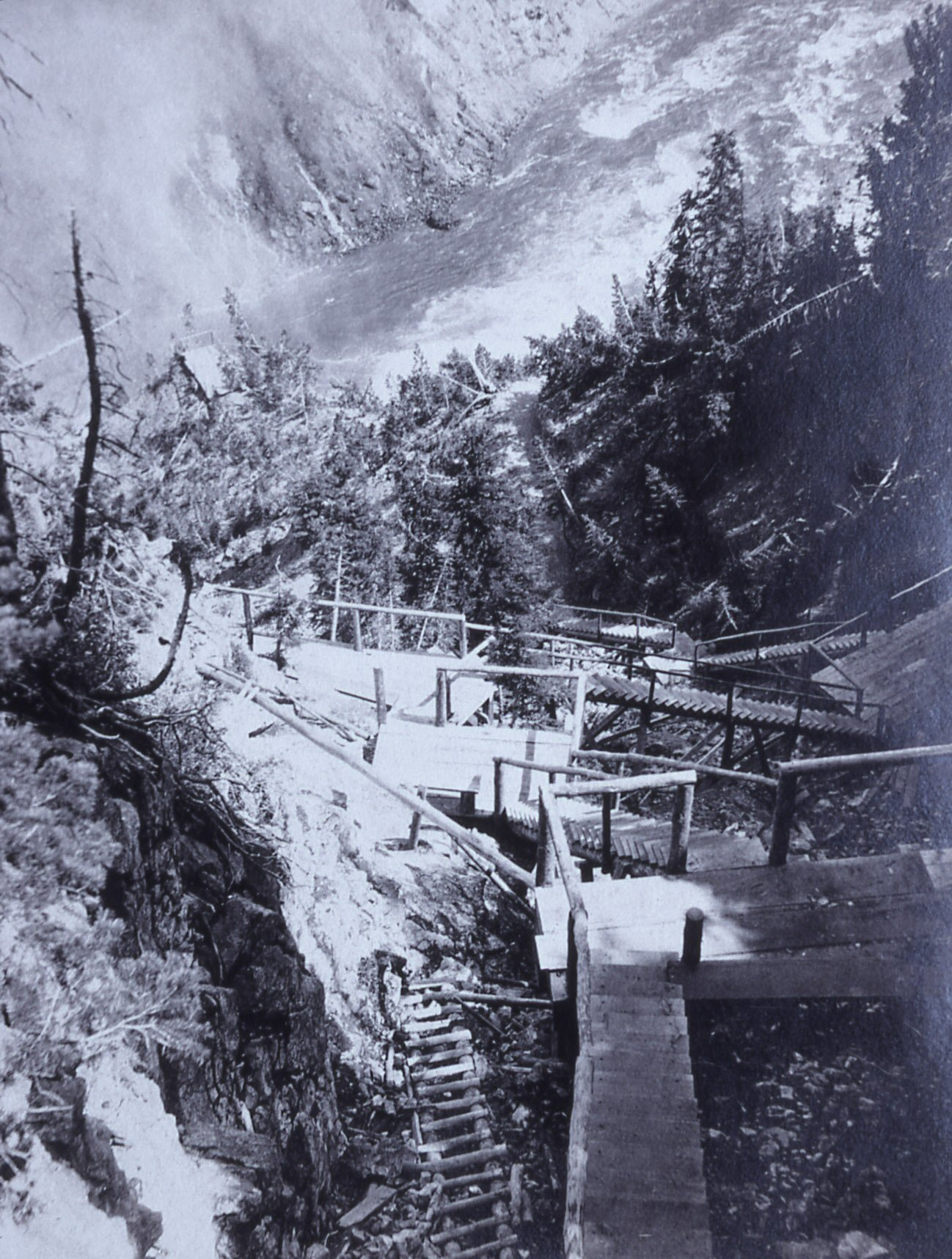
Uncle Tom's Trail

Although trappers and prospectors who visited the Yellowstone region had knowledge of the canyon, the first significant descriptions were publicized after the Cook–Folsom–Peterson Expedition of 1869 and the Washburn-Langford-Doane Expedition of 1870.

When Charles W. Cook first viewed the canyon after traveling west from the Lamar Valley on September 20, 1869, he subsequently wrote these words in his journal:

I was riding ahead, the two pack animals following, and then Mr. Folsom and Mr. Peterson on their saddle horses. I remembered seeing what appeared to be an opening in the forest ahead, which I presumed to be a park, or open country. While my attention was attracted by the pack animals, which had stopped to eat grass, my saddle horse suddenly stopped. I turned and looked forward from the brink of the great canyon, at a point just across from what is now called Inspiration Point. I sat there in amazement, while my companions came up, and after that, it seemed to me that it was five minutes before anyone spoke.

A year later during the Washburn expedition, on August 30–31, 1870, Lt. Gustavus C. Doane described the canyon with a bit more scientific detail:

As we approached the Grand Cañon a dull roaring sound warned us that the falls were near at hand. ... I had descended the cañon at a point where the creek joined the river, precipitated into a gorge just above its juncture in a lovely cascade of three falls, in the aggregate 100 feet in height. This was named Crystal Cascade, and the stream Cascade Creek. In the bed of the gorge were to be found an infinite variety of volcanic specimens, quartz, feldspar, mica, granites, lavas, basalts, composite crystals; in fact, everything, from asbestos to obsidian, was represented by fragments in the bed of this stream. There were also beautiful clay stone specimens, of which we afterward learned the origin. At the foot of the gorge and on the margin of the Yellowstone stood a high promontory of concretionary lava, literally filled with volcanic butternuts. Many of these were loose, and could be taken out of the rock with the hand; broken open they were invariably hollow, and lined with minute quartz crystals of various tints. This formation is rare, but occurs frequently in the great basin. From the outer point of this promontory can be seen the foot of the upper fall of the Yellowstone, and I climbed to the summit to obtain a view. In scenic beauty, the upper cataract far excels the lower. It has life, animation, while the lower one simply follows its channel; both, however, are eclipsed, as it were, by the singular wonders of the mighty cañon below. This deepens rapidly; the stream flowing over rapids continually. ... Several of the party descended into the chasm a short distance below the fall, but could not reach its foot. ... The walls of the cañon are of gypsum, in some places having an incrustation of lime white as snow, from which the reflected rays of the sun produce a dazzling effect, rendering it painful to look into the gulf. In others the rock is crystalline and almost wholly sulphur, of a dark yellow color, with streaks of red, green and black, caused by the percolations of hot mineral waters, of which thousands of springs are seen, in many instances, flowing from spouts high up on the walls on either side. The combinations of metallic lusters in the coloring of the walls is truly wonderful, surpassing, doubtless, anything of the kind on the face of the globe. The ground slopes to the cañon on the opposite or east side, and from it to the low valley on the west. Three miles below the fall the chasm is 1,050 feet deep. In some places masses of the rock have crumbled and slid down in a talus of loose material at the foot; in others, promontories stand out in all manner of fantastic forms, affording vistas of wonder utterly beyond the power of description. On the caps of these dizzy heights, mountain sheep and elk rest during the night. ... We had come down the ravine at least four miles, and looking upward the fearful wall appeared to reach the sky. It was about 3 o'clock p.m., and stars could be distinctly seen, so much of the sunlight was cut off from entering the chasm. Tall pines on the extreme verge appeared the height of two or three feet. The cañon, as before said, was in two benches, with a plateau on either side, about half way down. This plateau, about a hundred yards in width, looked from below like a mere shelf against the wall; the total depth was not less than 2,500 feet, and more probably 3,000. There are perhaps other canons longer and deeper than this one, but surely none combining grandeur and immensity with peculiarity of formation and profusion of volcanic or chemical phenomena.

In 1890, Bozeman resident H.F. Richardson (known as "Uncle Tom") was given a permit to operate a ferry across the Yellowstone River near the site of today's Chittenden Memorial Bridge and take tourists down into the canyon below the lower falls on a steep stairway down to the base of the lower falls called Uncle Tom's Trail, although the original trail no longer exists. Uncle Tom's Trail is around a 3-mile hike.

Calcite Spring

== Geology ==
The specifics of the geology of the canyon are not well understood, except that it is the result of erosion by the Yellowstone River, not by glaciation. After the Yellowstone Caldera eruption about 600,000 years ago, the area was covered by a series of lava flows. The area was also faulted by the doming action of the caldera before the eruption. The site of the present canyon, as well as any previous canyons, was probably the result of this uplift and related faulting, which allowed erosion to proceed at an accelerated rate. The area was also covered by the glaciers that formed during several ice ages. Glacial deposits probably filled the canyon at one time, but have since been eroded away, leaving little or no evidence of their presence.

The canyon below the Lower Yellowstone Falls was at one time the site of a geyser basin that was the result of rhyolite lava flows, extensive faulting, and heat beneath the surface (related to the hot spot). When the geyser basin was formed in the area is unknown, although it was probably present at the time of the last glaciation. The chemical and heat action of the geyser basin caused the rhyolite rock to become hydrothermally altered, making it very soft and brittle and more easily erodible. Evidence of this thermal activity still exists in the canyon in the form of active and visible geysers and hot springs. The Clear Lake area, which is fed by hot springs, south of the canyon is probably also a remnant of this activity. According to Ken Pierce, U.S. Geological Survey geologist, at the end of the last glacial period, about 14,000 to 18,000 years ago, ice dams formed at the mouth of Yellowstone Lake. When the ice dams melted, a great volume of water was released downstream, causing massive flash floods and immediate and catastrophic erosion of the present-day canyon. These flash floods probably happened more than once. The canyon is a classic V-shaped valley, indicative of river-type erosion rather than glaciation. Today, the canyon is still being eroded by the Yellowstone River.

The colors in the canyon are also a result of hydrothermal alteration. The rhyolite in the canyon contains a variety of different iron compounds. When the old geyser basin was active, the "cooking" of the rock caused chemical alterations in these iron compounds. Exposure to the elements caused the rocks to change colors. The rocks are oxidizing; in effect, the canyon is rusting. The colors indicate the presence or absence of water in the individual iron compounds. Most of the yellows in the canyon are the result of iron present in the rock.

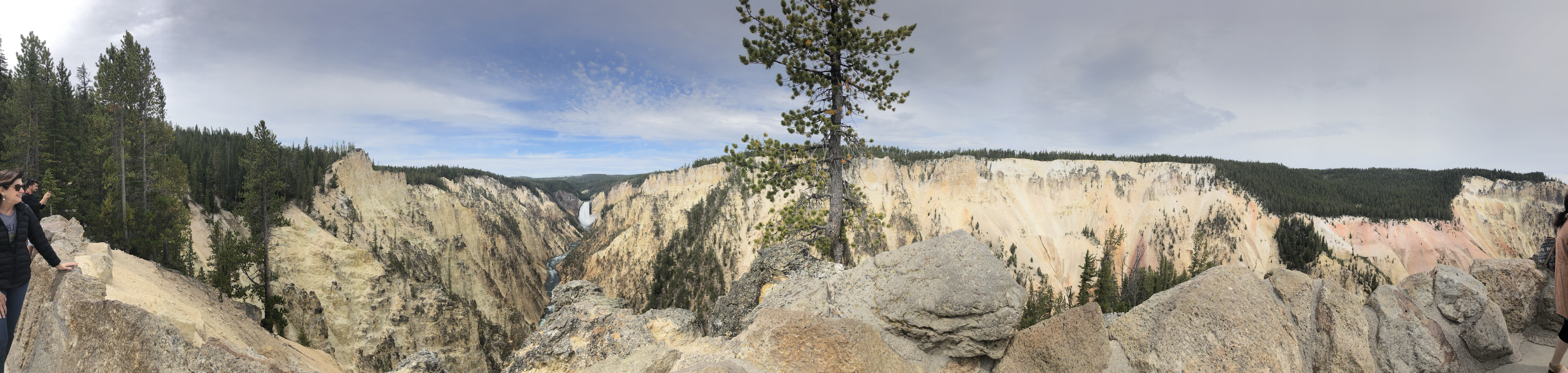
Panorama of the Canyon with the Lower Falls in view
