= Salvator Rosa =

Italian painter, poet and printmaker (1615–1673)

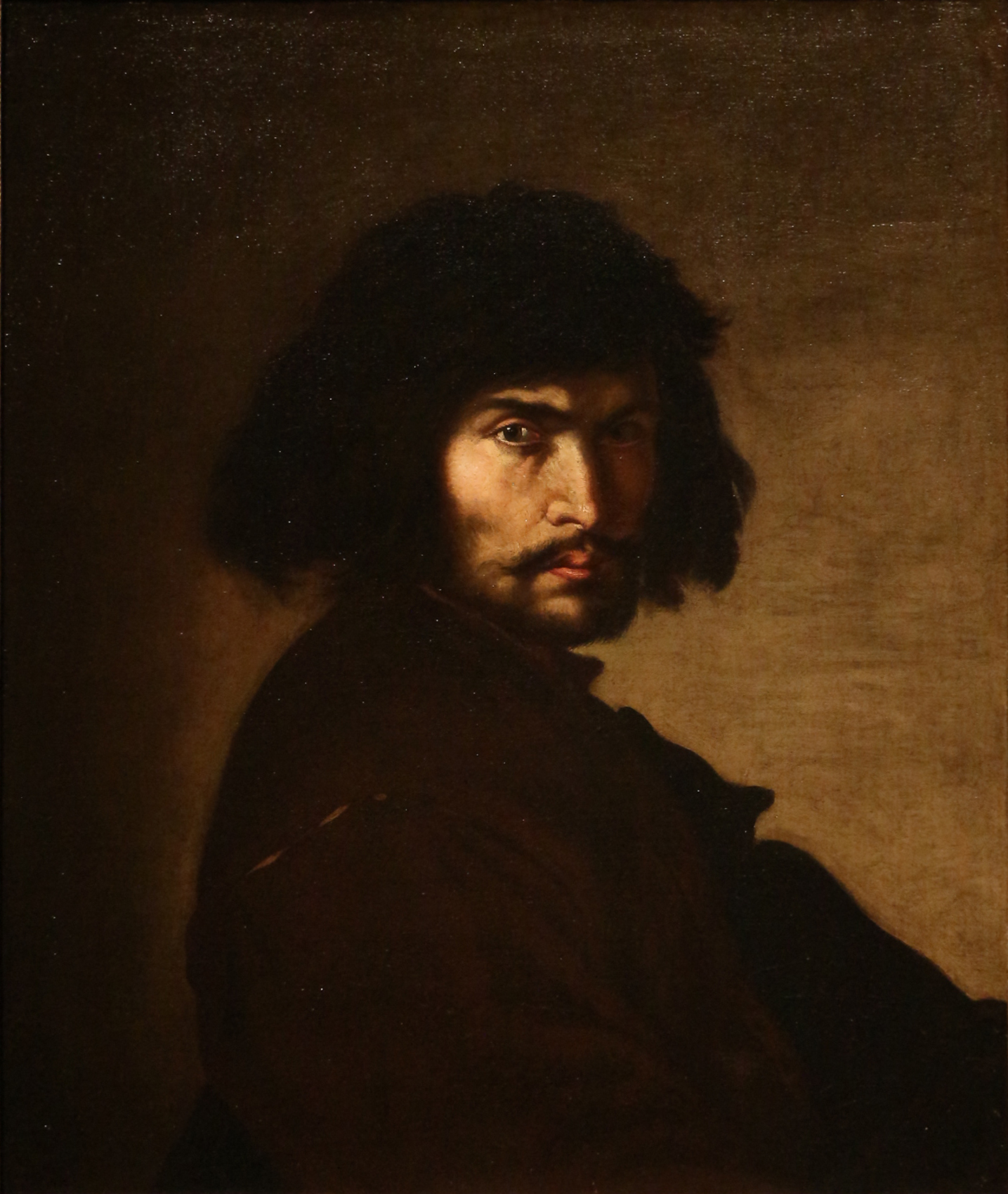
- Self Portrait (c. 1650s), oil on canvas, 75 x 62.5 cm., Detroit Institute of Art.
- Born: 20 June or 21 July 1615; Arenella, Kingdom of Naples
- Died: 15 March 1673 (aged 57); Rome, Papal States
- Known for: Painting, printmaking, poetry
- Movement: Baroque

Salvator Rosa (1615 – 15 March 1673) is best known today as an Italian Baroque painter, whose romanticised landscapes and history paintings, often set in dark and untamed nature, exerted considerable influence from the 17th century into the early 19th century. In his lifetime, he was among the most famous painters, known for his flamboyant personality, and regarded as an accomplished poet, satirist, actor, musician and printmaker. He was active in Naples, Rome, and Florence, where on occasion he was compelled to move between cities, as his caustic satire earned him enemies in the artistic and intellectual circles of the day.

As a history painter, he often selected obscure and esoteric subjects from the Bible, mythology, and the lives of philosophers, which were seldom addressed by other artists. He rarely painted the common religious subjects, unless they allowed a treatment dominated by the landscape element. He also produced battle scenes, allegories, scenes of witchcraft, and many self-portraits. However, he is most highly regarded for his very original landscapes, depicting "sublime" nature: often wild and hostile, at times rendering the people that populated them as marginal in the greater realm of nature. They were prototypes of the romantic landscape and the very antithesis of the "picturesque" classical views of Claude Lorrain. Some critics have noted that his technical skills and craftsmanship as a painter were not always equal to his truly innovative and original visions. This is in part due to a large number of canvases he hastily produced in his youth (1630s) in pursuit of financial gain, paintings that Rosa himself came to loathe and distance himself from in his later years, as well as posthumously misattributed paintings. Many of his peopled landscapes ended up abroad by the 18th century, and he was better known in England and France than most Italian Baroque painters.

Rosa has been described as "unorthodox and extravagant", a "perpetual rebel", "The Anti-Claude", and a proto-Romantic. He had a great influence on Romanticism, becoming a cult-like figure in the late 18th and early 19th centuries, and myths and legends grew around his life to the point that his real life was scarcely distinguished from the bandits and outsiders that roamed the wild and thundery landscapes he painted. By the mid-19th century, however, with the rise of realism and Impressionism, his work fell from favour and received very little attention. A renewed interest in his paintings emerged in the late 20th century, and although he is not ranked among the very greatest of the Baroque painters by art historians today, he is considered an innovative and significant landscape painter and a progenitor of the Romantic movement.

== Biography ==
=== Early life ===
Rosa was born in Arenella, at that time on the outskirts of Naples, on either 20 June 20 or 21 July 1615. His mother was Giulia Greca Rosa, a member of one of the Greek families of Sicily. His father, Vito Antonio de Rosa, a land surveyor, urged his son to become a lawyer or a priest, and entered him into the convent of the Somaschi Fathers. Yet Salvator showed a preference for the arts and secretly worked with his maternal uncle, Paolo Greco, to learn about painting. He soon transferred himself to the tutelage of his brother-in-law Francesco Fracanzano, a pupil of Ribera, and afterward to either Aniello Falcone, a contemporary of Domenico Gargiulo, or to Ribera. Some sources claim he spent time living with roving bandits. At the age of seventeen, his father died; his mother was destitute with at least five children, and Salvatore found himself without financial support and the head of a household looking to him for support.

He continued his apprenticeship with Falcone, helping him complete his battlepiece canvases. In that studio, it is said that Giovanni Lanfranco took notice of his work, and advised him to relocate to Rome, where he stayed from 1634 until 1636.

Returning to Naples, he began painting haunting landscapes, overgrown with vegetation, or jagged beaches, mountains, and caves. Rosa was among the first to paint "romantic" landscapes, with a special turn for scenes of picturesque, often turbulent and rugged scenes peopled with shepherds, brigands, seamen, soldiers. These early landscapes were sold cheaply through private dealers.

He returned to Rome in 1638–39, where he was housed by Cardinal Francesco Maria Brancaccio, bishop of Viterbo. For the Chiesa Santa Maria della Morte in Viterbo, Rosa painted the first of his few altarpieces, the Incredulity of Thomas.

=== Wife and family ===
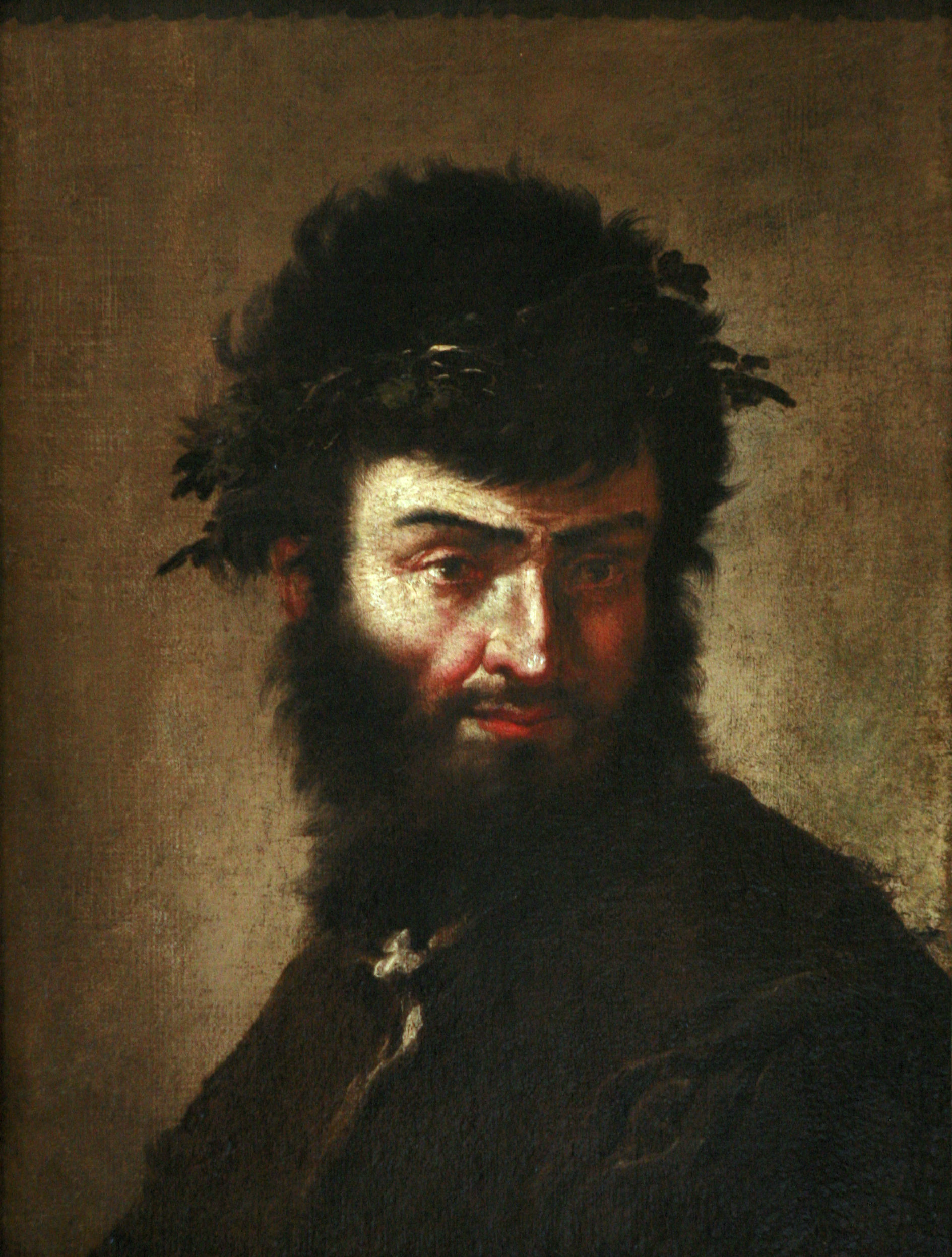
Self-portrait (c. 1645), oil on canvas, 61 x 45 cm., (Musée des Beaux-Arts de Strasbourg)

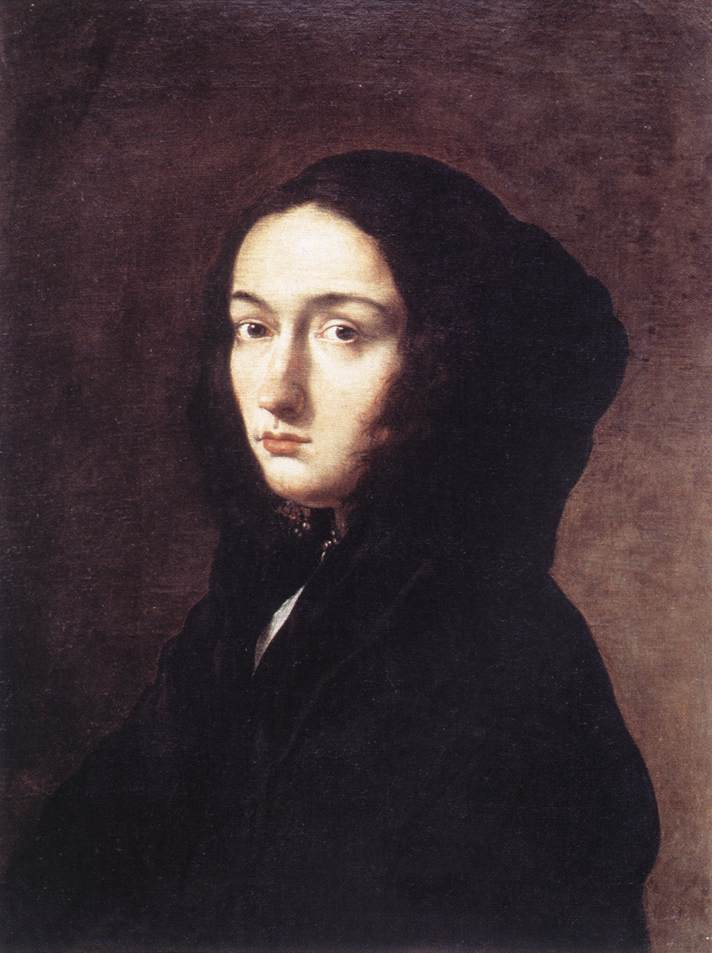
Portrait of Lucrezia Paolini (c. 1656–1660), oil on canvas, 66 x 50.5 cm., Galleria Nazionale d'Arte Antica

In 1640, Rosa met Lucrezia Paolini (c. 1620–1696) in Florence. Lucrezia was a married woman whose husband had left the city and abandoned her soon after their marriage, never to return. She served as a model for Rosa on occasion, and was likely the model for the allegory of Music (c. 1641). Rosa and Lucrezia soon became dedicated and lifelong companions. Their first son, Rosalvo, was born in August 1641, probably in Volterra, and another son, Augusto, was born in 1657. Records show at least four more children were born and placed with foundling hospitals between 1641 and 1657, giving some indication of their poor financial condition in those years. The custom of unmarried couples living together was not uncommon in the early years of the 17th century, but as the decades passed, the church grew less and less tolerant of the practice. At times, Rosa's prominent reputation and relationships to powerful patrons helped to shield him from the Inquisition. At other times, the situation left him vulnerable to the many rivals and enemies he made through his satires and ostentatious character. In 1656, feeling pressure in Rome from the poet Agostino Favoriti and his close ally Fabio Chigi, recently elected Pope Alexander VII, Rosa sent Lucrezia and their son Rosalvo to stay in Naples with his family. Soon after she arrived, a severe outbreak of the plague hit Naples, and Rosalvo, Salvator's brother, sister, brother-in-law and their children all died in the epidemic. Lucrezia survived, however and returned to Rome alone. The following year, their son Augusto was born. Near the end of his life, declining in health and anticipating death, Rosa married Lucrezia on 4 March 1673. On 17 March, he died. An inventory of Rosa's house taken in 1673 shortly after his death, indicated the Portrait of Lucrezia Paolini was hanging in a prominent location in the home, and one of the few paintings in his possession when he died.

=== Career ===
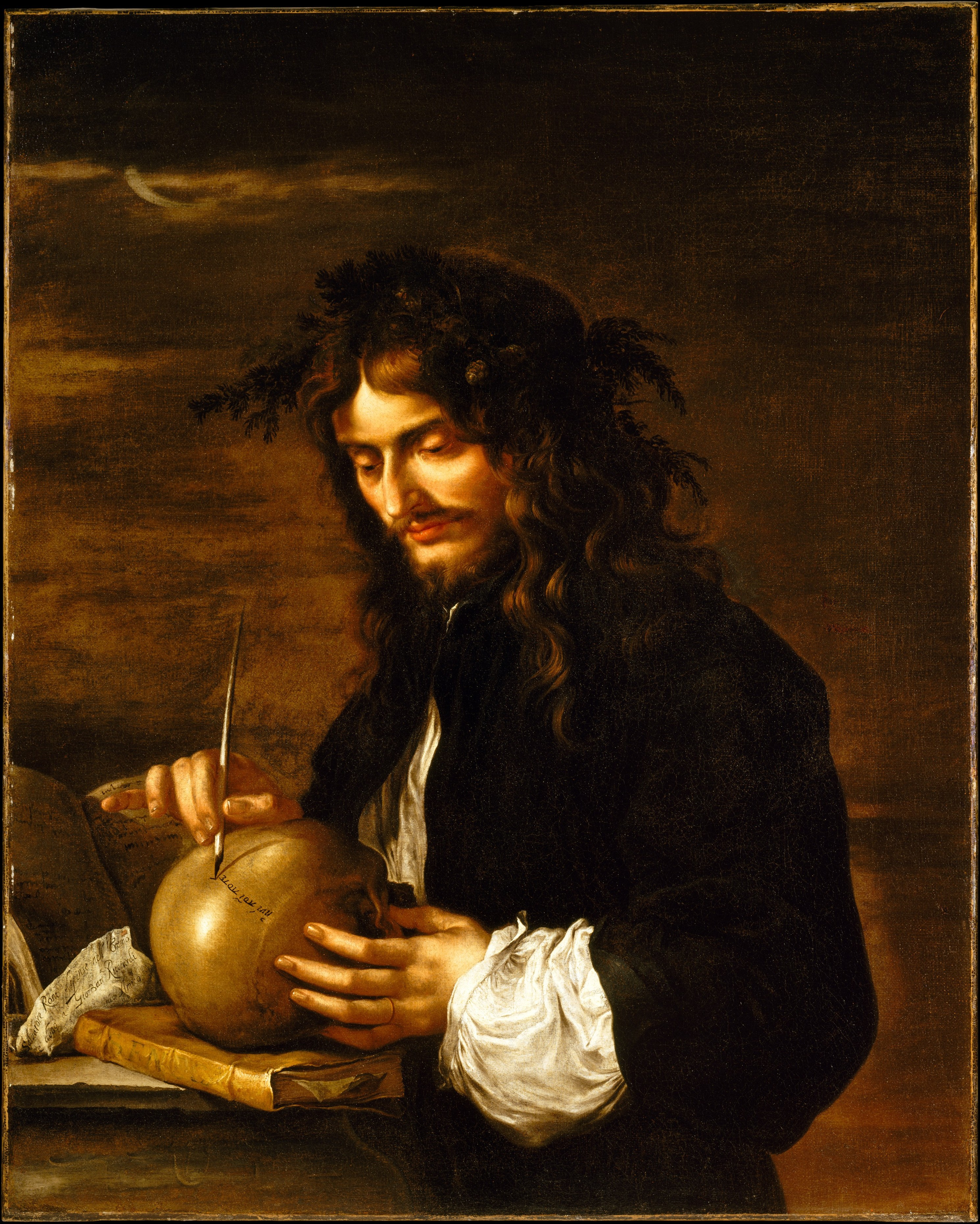
Self-Portrait (c. 1647), oil on canvas, 91 x 79.4 cm., Metropolitan Museum of Art. Rosa inscribes the Greek words "Behold, whither, when" while contemplating a skull

While Rosa had a facile genius at painting, he pursued a wide variety of arts: music, poetry, writing, etching, and acting. In Rome, he befriended Pietro Testa and Claude Lorrain. During a Roman carnival play, he wrote and acted in a masque, in which his character bustled about Rome distributing satirical prescriptions for diseases of the body and, more particularly, of the mind. In costume, he inveighed against the farcical comedies acted in the Trastevere under the direction of Bernini.

While his plays were successful, this activity also gained him powerful enemies among patrons and artists, including Bernini himself, in Rome. Around 1640, he accepted an invitation from Giovanni Carlo de' Medici to relocate to Florence, where he stayed until 1649. Once there, Rosa sponsored a combination of studio and salon of poets, playwrights, and painters—the so-called Accademia dei Percossi (Academy of the Stricken). To the rigid art milieu of Florence, he introduced his canvases of wild landscapes; while influential, he gathered few true pupils. Another painter-poet, Lorenzo Lippi, shared with Rosa the hospitality of the cardinal and the same circle of friends. Rosa encouraged Lippi to proceed with the poem Il Malmantile racquistato. He was well acquainted also with Ugo and Giulio Maffei, and was housed with them in Volterra, where he wrote four satires Music, Poetry, Painting, and War. About the same time, he painted Philosophy, now in the National Gallery, London.

A passage in one of his satires suggests that he sympathised with the 1647 insurrection led by Masaniello—whose portrait he painted, though probably not from life. Rosa's tempestuous art and reputation as a rebel gave rise to a popular legend—recounted in a biography of Rosa published in 1824 by Sydney, Lady Morgan—that Rosa lived with a gang of bandits and participated in the uprising in Naples against Spanish rule. Although these activities cannot be conveniently dovetailed into known dates of his career, in 1846 a famous romantic ballet about this story titled Catarina was produced in London by the choreographer Jules Perrot and composer Cesare Pugni.

He returned to stay in Rome in 1649. Here, he increasingly focused on large-scale paintings, tackling themes and stories unusual for seventeenth-century painters. These included Democritus amid the Tombs, The Death of Socrates, The Death of Regulus (these two are now in England), Justice Quitting the Earth and the Allegory of Fortune. This last work raised a storm of controversy among religious and civil authorities who perceived in it a satire directed at them. Rosa, endeavouring at conciliation, published a text in which he provided anodyne explanations for the painting's imagery; nonetheless, he was nearly arrested. It was about this time that Rosa wrote his satire named Babylon.

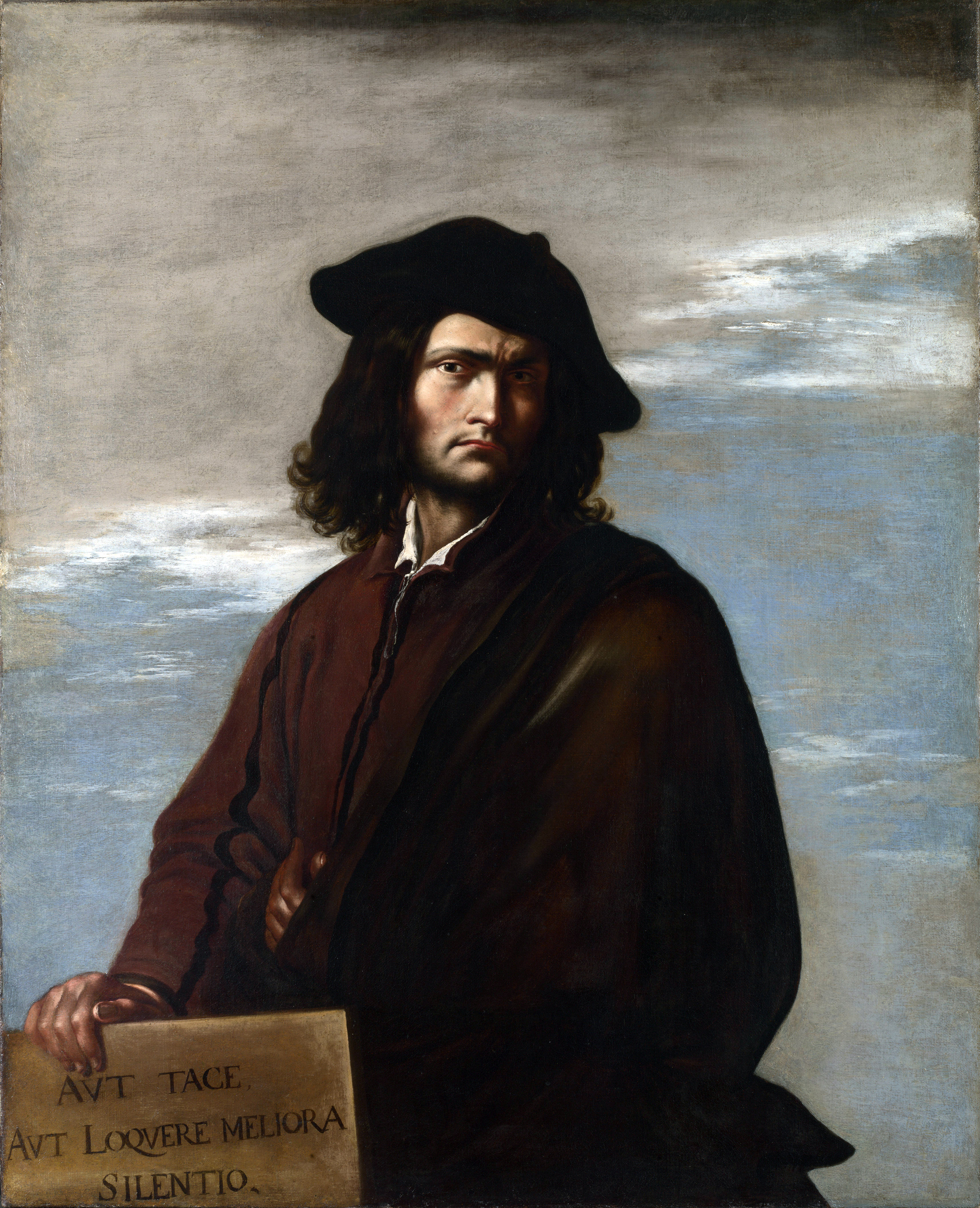
Philosophy (1641), oil on canvas, 116 x 94 cm., National Gallery. Inscription "Keep silent or say something better than silence". This painting and its companion, Poetry, are often identified as a self-portrait and a portrait of Lucrezia, but these attributions have been questioned by some scholars.

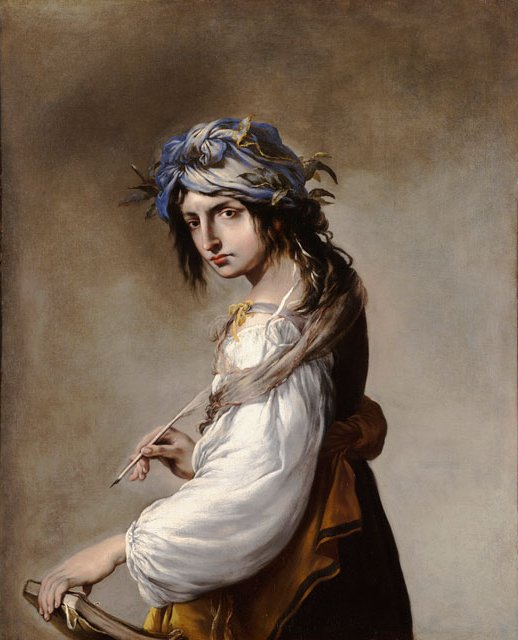
Poetry (1641), oil on canvs, 116.2 x 94.6 cm., Wadsworth Atheneum. An inscription on a fragment of relining canvas on the back, added c. 1767, identifies this as Lucrezia Paolini, Rosa's companion/wife, but some scholars have argued that this attribution is an error.

His criticisms of Roman art culture won him several enemies. An allegation arose that his published satires were not his own, but Rosa vehemently denied the charges. It may be possible that literary friends in Florence and Volterra coached him about the topic of his satires, while the compositions of which remained nonetheless his own. To confute his detractors, he wrote the last of the series, entitled Envy.

Among the pictures of his last years were the Saul and the Witch of Endor and Battlepiece now in the Musée du Louvre, the latter painted in 40 days, full of longdrawn carnage, with ships burning in the offing; Polycrates and the Fishermen; and the Oath of Catiline (Palazzo Pitti).

While occupied with a series of satirical portraits, to be closed by one of himself, Rosa was assailed by dropsy. He died a half year later. His tomb is in Santa Maria degli Angeli e dei Martiri, where a portrait of him has been set up. Salvator Rosa, after struggles of his early youth, had successfully earned a handsome fortune.

He was a significant etcher, with a series of small prints of soldiers, and a number of larger subjects.

Among his pupils were Evangelista Martinotti of Monferrato and his brother Francesco. Another pupil was Ascanio della Penna of Perugia.

== Legacy ==
During Rosa's lifetime, his work inspired followers such as Giovanni Ghisolfi, but his most lasting influence was on the later development of romantic and sublime landscape traditions within painting. Eighteenth-century artists influenced by Rosa include Alessandro Magnasco, Andrea Locatelli, Giovanni Paolo Panini and Marco Ricci. As Wittkower states, it is in his landscapes, not his grand historical or religious dramas, that Rosa truly expresses his innovative abilities most graphically. Rosa himself dismissed his early landscapes as frivolous capricci in comparison to his history paintings and later work, but the academically conventional history canvases often restrained his rebellious streak. He generally avoided the idyllic and pastoral calm country-sides of Claude Lorrain and Paul Bril in his landscapes, and created brooding, melancholic fantasies, awash in ruins and brigands. By the eighteenth century, the contrasts between Rosa and the "sublime" landscape, and artists such as Claude and the "picturesque" landscape, were much remarked upon. A 1748 poem by James Thomson, "The Castle of Indolence", illustrated this: "Whate'er Lorraine light touched with softening hue/ Or savage Rosa dashed, or learned Poussin drew".

In a time when artists were often highly constrained by patrons, Rosa had a plucky streak of independence, which celebrated the special role of the artist. "Our wealth must consist in things of the spirit, and in contenting ourselves with sipping, while others gorge themselves in prosperity". He refused to paint on commission or to agree on a price beforehand, and he chose his own subjects. In his own words, he painted "...purely for my own satisfaction. I need to be transported by enthusiasm and I can only employ my brushes when I am in ecstasy."

=== Salvator Rosa and romanticism ===
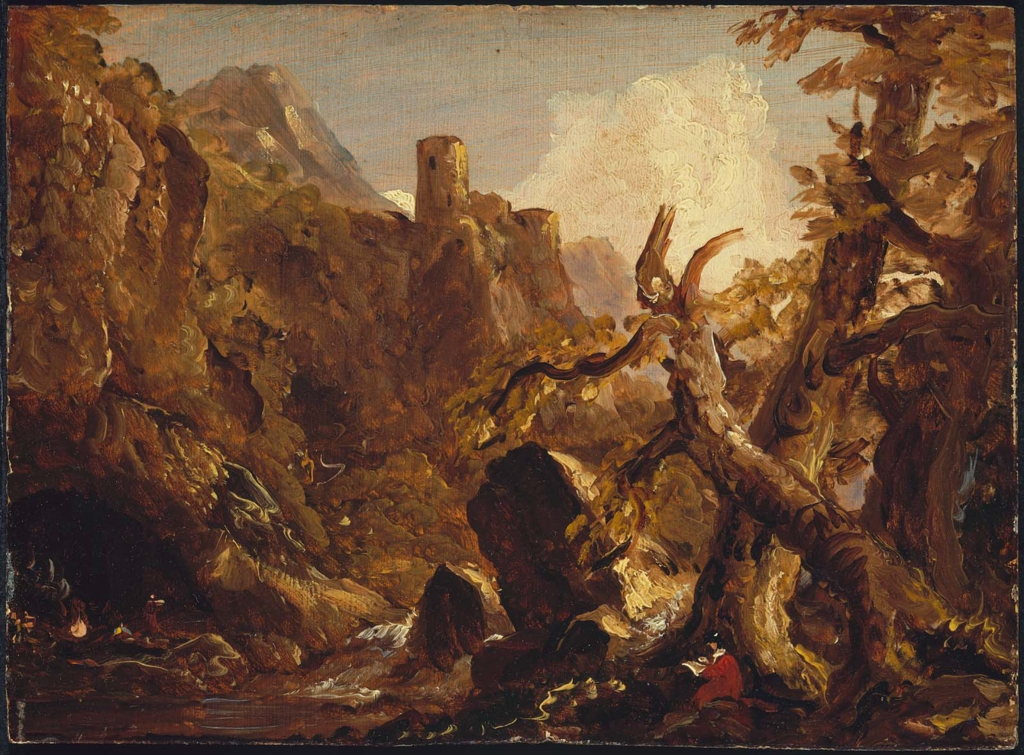
Salvator Rosa Sketching Banditti, by Thomas Cole (1832), oil on pane,17.7 x 24.1 cm., Museum of Fine Arts, Boston

Rosa's influence on romanticism in the late 18th and early 19th centuries was profound. Art historians have described him as a "cult figure", who "inaugurated the romantic landscape", an initiator of the "cult" of the sublime landscape. One of the earliest manifestations of the romantic movement to emerge in the early 18th century was the English landscape garden, and the paintings of Rosa, as well as Claude Lorrain and Nicolas Poussin were key inspirations and models. William Kent, who originated the naturalised garden, was known to be a great admirer of Rosa and went so far as to plant dead trees in his gardens to achieve Salvator Rosa effects.

One historian noted, "An extraordinary amount of Rosa's fame and influence in England seems to have rested on verbal and literary transmission, and had an impact that extended far beyond the borderline of purely pictorial concerns." In A Philosophical Enquiry into the Origin of Our Ideas of the Sublime and Beautiful (1757), Edmund Burke designated Salvator Rosa as the "painter of the Sublime". Horace Walpole, Sir Joshua Reynolds, and Percy Bysshe Shelley wrote highly of his paintings. "His name came to be a kind of code word for the qualities most appreciated by the romantics.....savage sublimity, terror, grandeur, astonishment, and pleasing horror" A number of accounts of Rosa's life were published purporting to be biographies, often including fictionalized anecdotes. Rosa was the subject of an opera by Antônio Carlos Gomes, the ballet Catarina or La Fille du Bandit, and a song by Giovanni Bononcini, which Franz Liszt included an arrangement of in his suite Annees de pelerinage, Deuxieme annee: Italie, (S.161) No. 3, Canzonetta del Salvator Rosa.

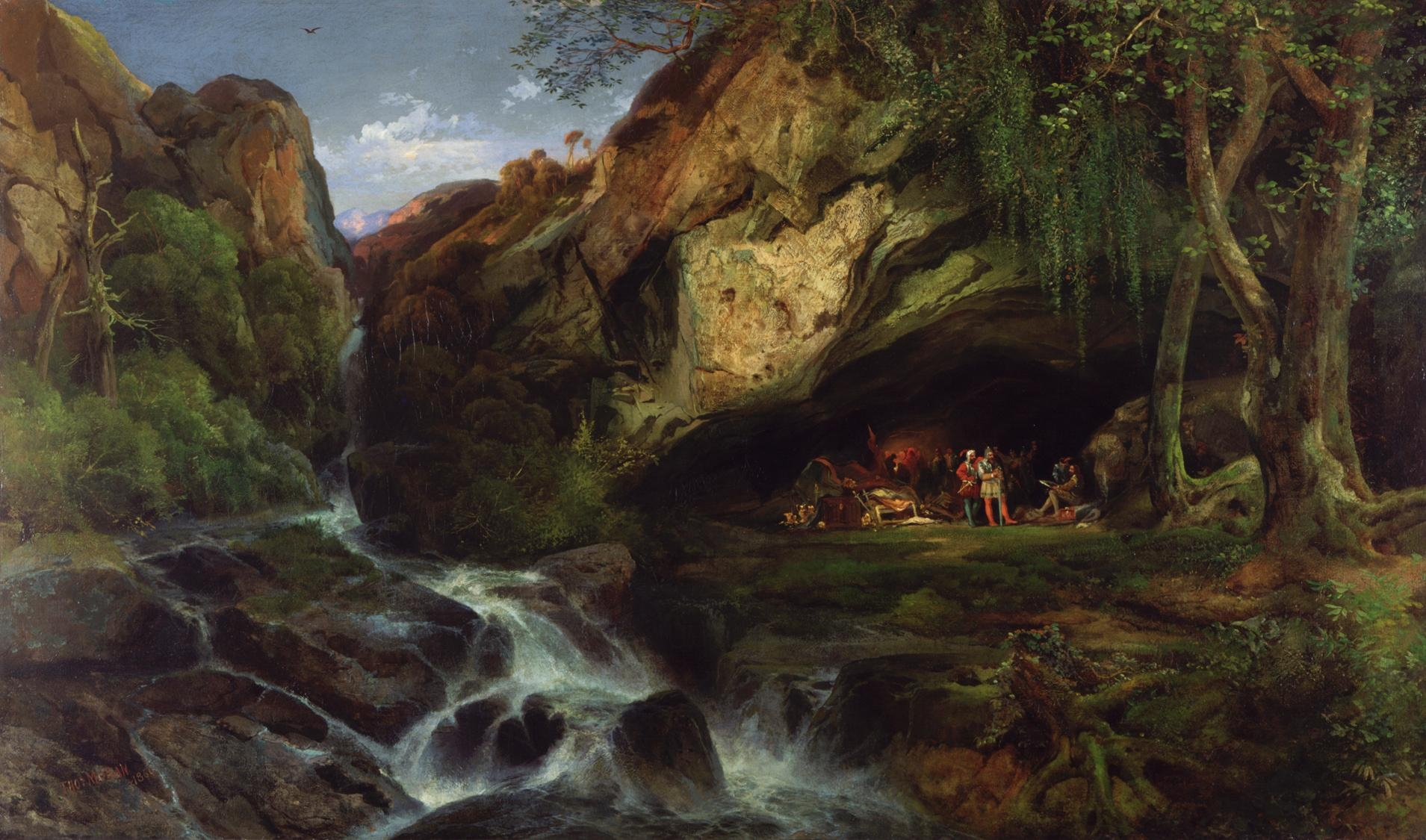
Salvator Rosa Sketching the Banditti, by Thomas Moran (1860), oil on canvas, 101.6 x 169.9 cm., Chrysler Museum of Art

Rosa and his tempestuous spirit became the darling of British Romantics such as Henry Fuseli, John Hamilton Mortimer, and Alexander Runciman. His influence can be seen in the work of an artist such as John Martin, who studied Rosa's work in his formative years. A recent exhibit of J. M. W. Turner's work, at the Prado museum in Madrid, notes the influence Rosa had on Turner's landscapes. Rosa's influence can also be seen in American art of the period. Thomas Cole counted Rosa among his heroes, and his impact has been identified in the work of artists such as Washington Allston, George Caleb Bingham, Thomas Moran, William Sidney Mount, John Trumbull, Benjamin West and other American artist.

Rosa's reputation and influence waned in the nineteenth century; when his Monks Fishing was displayed in Dulwich in 1843 it was criticized by John Ruskin as telling "unmitigated falsehoods" and containing "laws of nature set at open defiance". Since the 1970s, Rosa's work has received renewed attention from scholars. including museum exhibitions, a catalog raisonné, catalogs of his drawings, the publication of his letters, biographical works, and other volumes ranging from paperback picture books to scholarly monographs.

=== Satires ===
Cesareo (1892) and Cartelli (1899) wrote books taking account of Rosa's satires. The satires, though considerably spread abroad during his lifetime, were not published until 1719. They are all in terza rima, written without much literary correctness, but spirited. Rosa here appears as a very severe castigator of all ranks and conditions of men, not sparing the highest, and as a champion of the poor and downtrodden, and of moral virtue and Catholic faith.

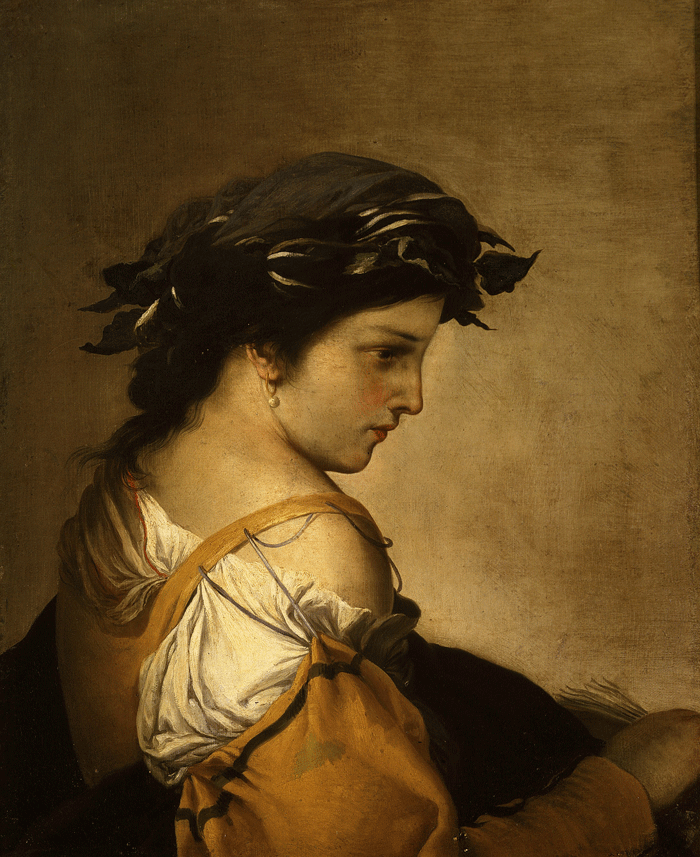
Poetry (1641), oil on canvas, 73 x 58 cm., Galleria Nazionale d'Arte Antica

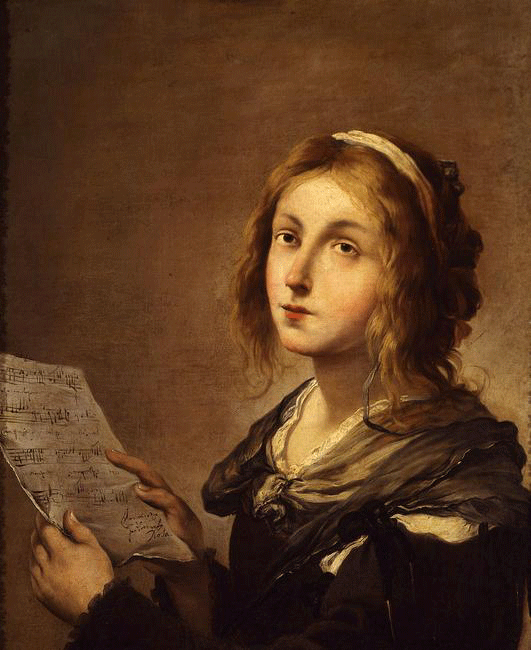
Music (1641), oil on canvas, 73 x 58 cm., Galleria Nazionale d'Arte Antica

The satire on Music exposes the insolence and profligacy of musicians, and the shame of courts and churches in encouraging them. Poetry dwells on the pedantry, imitativeness, adulation, affectation and indecency of poets—also their poverty, and the neglect with which they were treated; and there is a very vigorous sortie against oppressive governors and aristocrats. Tasso's glory is upheld; Dante is spoken of as obsolete, and Ariosto as corrupting.

Painting inveighs against the pictorial treatment of squalid subjects, such as beggars, against the ignorance and lewdness of painters, and their tricks of trade, and the gross indecorum of painting sprawling half-naked saints of both sexes. War (which contains a eulogy of Masaniello) derides the folly of mercenary soldiers, who fight and perish while kings stay at home; the vile morals of kings and lords, their heresy and unbelief.

In Babylon, Rosa represents himself as a fisherman, Tirreno, constantly unlucky in his net-hauls on the Euphrates; he converses with a native of the country, Ergasto. Babylon (Rome) is very severely treated, and Naples much the same.

Envy (the last of the satires, and generally accounted the best) represents Rosa dreaming that, as he is about to inscribe in all modesty his name upon the threshold of the temple of glory, the goddess or fiend of Envy obstructs him, and a long interchange of reciprocal objurgations ensues. Here occurs the highly charged portrait of the chief Roman detractor of Salvator (we are not aware that he has ever been identified by name), and the painter protests that he would never condescend to do any of the lascivious work in painting so shamefully in vogue.

Though critical of contemporary art and poetry, Rosa is part of his age in his frequent weighty classical allusions, his lexical freedom, and his liking for ornate rhetorical structures. His poetry also shows a directness and accuracy of expression that drives home the satiric point, often laconically.

== Galleries ==
=== Paintings ===
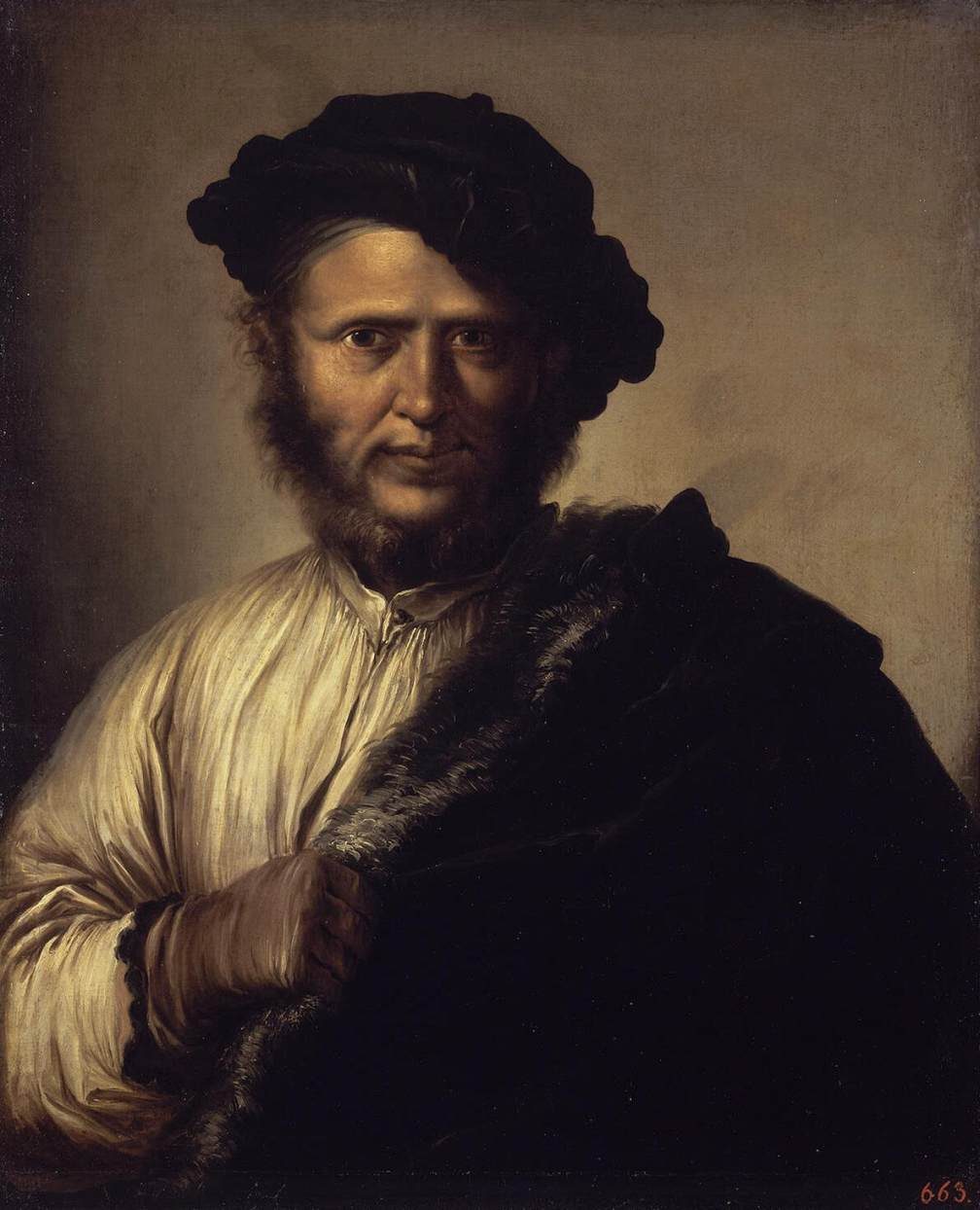
Portrait of a Man (1640s), oil on canvas, 78 x 65 cm., Hermitage Museum)

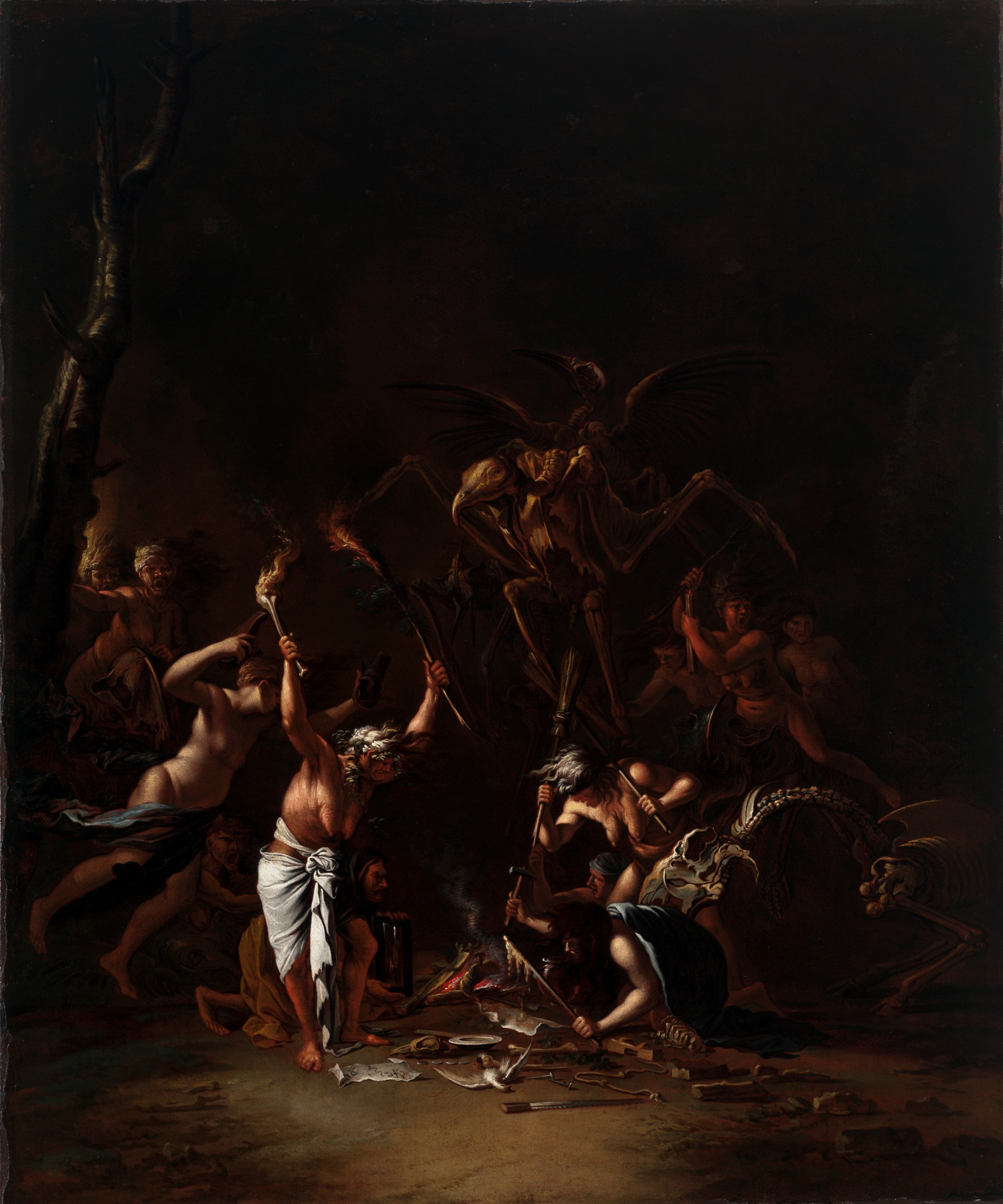
Witches' Sabbath (c. 1655), oil on canvas, 87 x 73 cm., Museum of Fine Arts, Houston

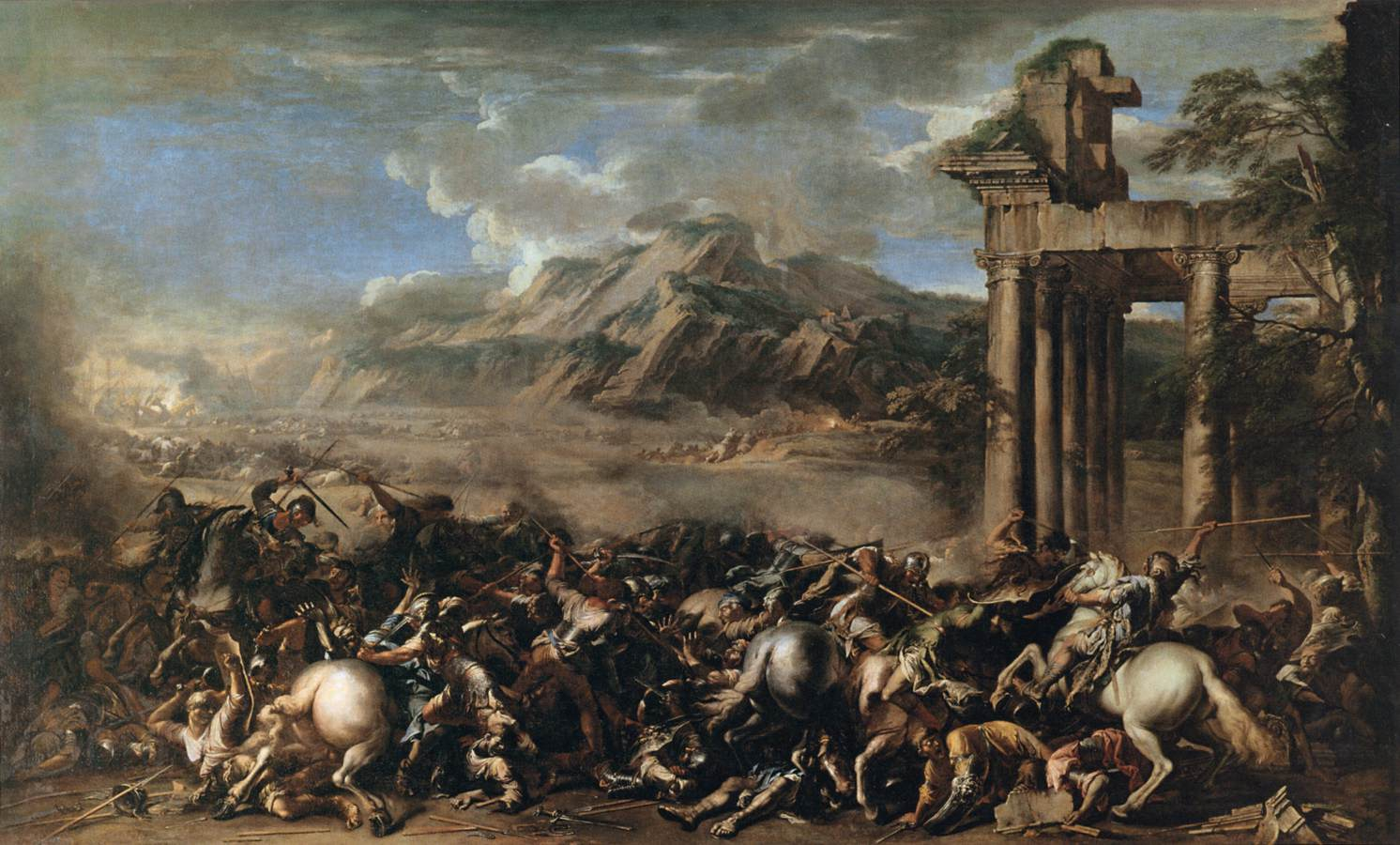
Heroic Battle (c. 1652–1664), oil on canvas, 214 x 351 cm. Louvre

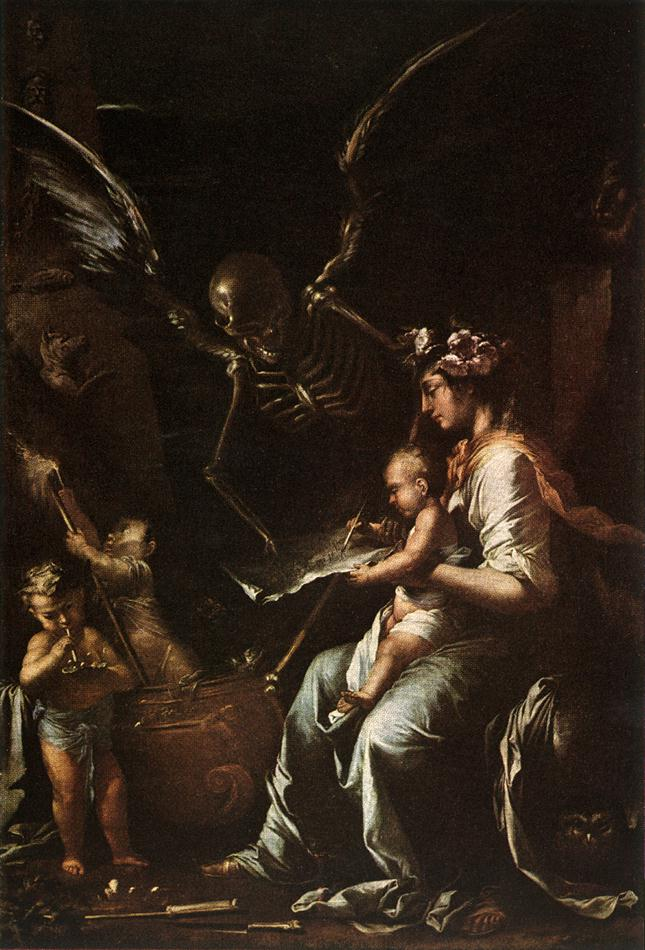
Human Fragility (c. 1656), oil on canvas, 199 x 134 cm., Fitzwilliam Museum

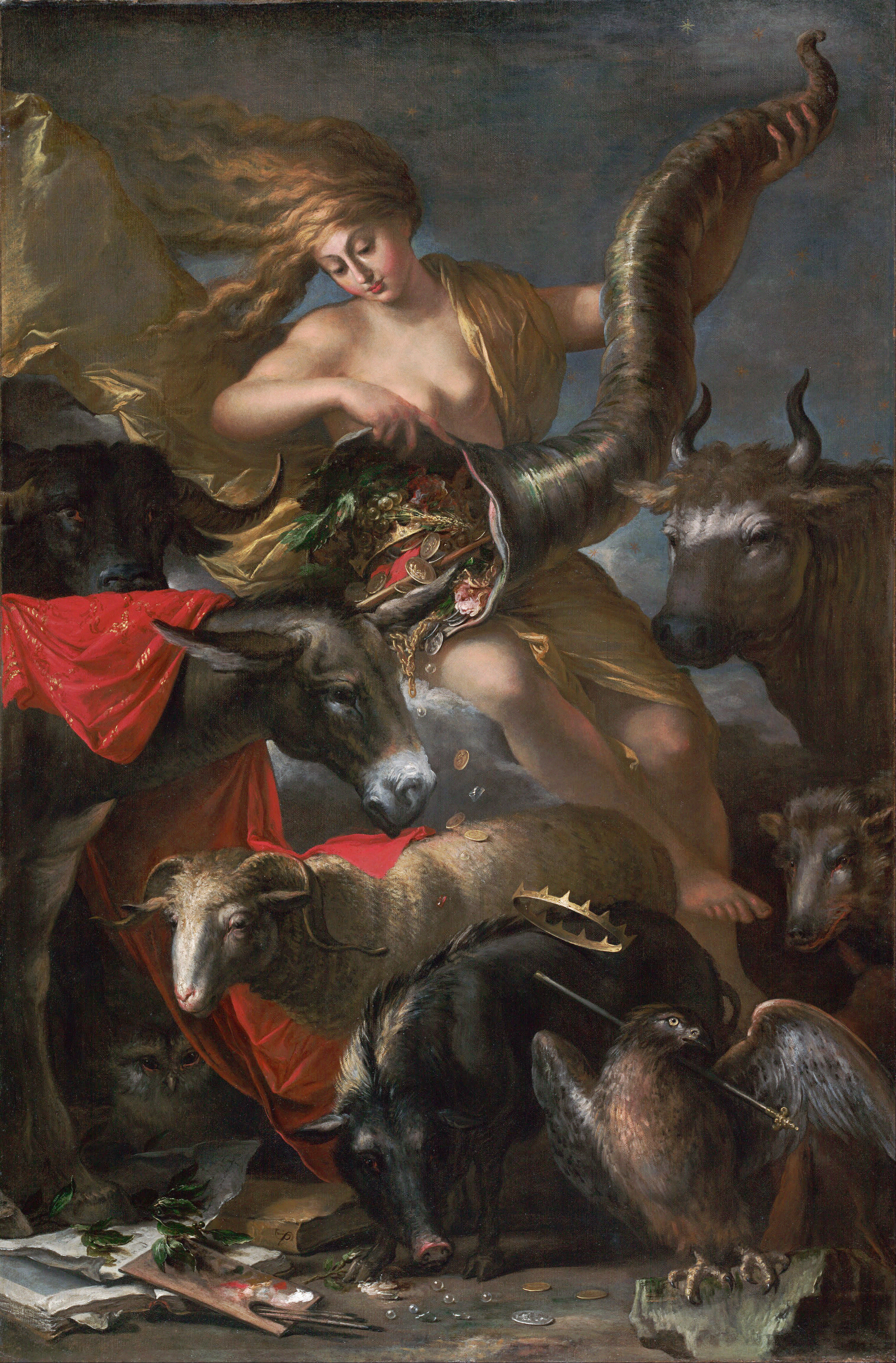
Allegory of Fortune (1658), oil on canvas, 198 x 133 cm., J. Paul Getty Museum

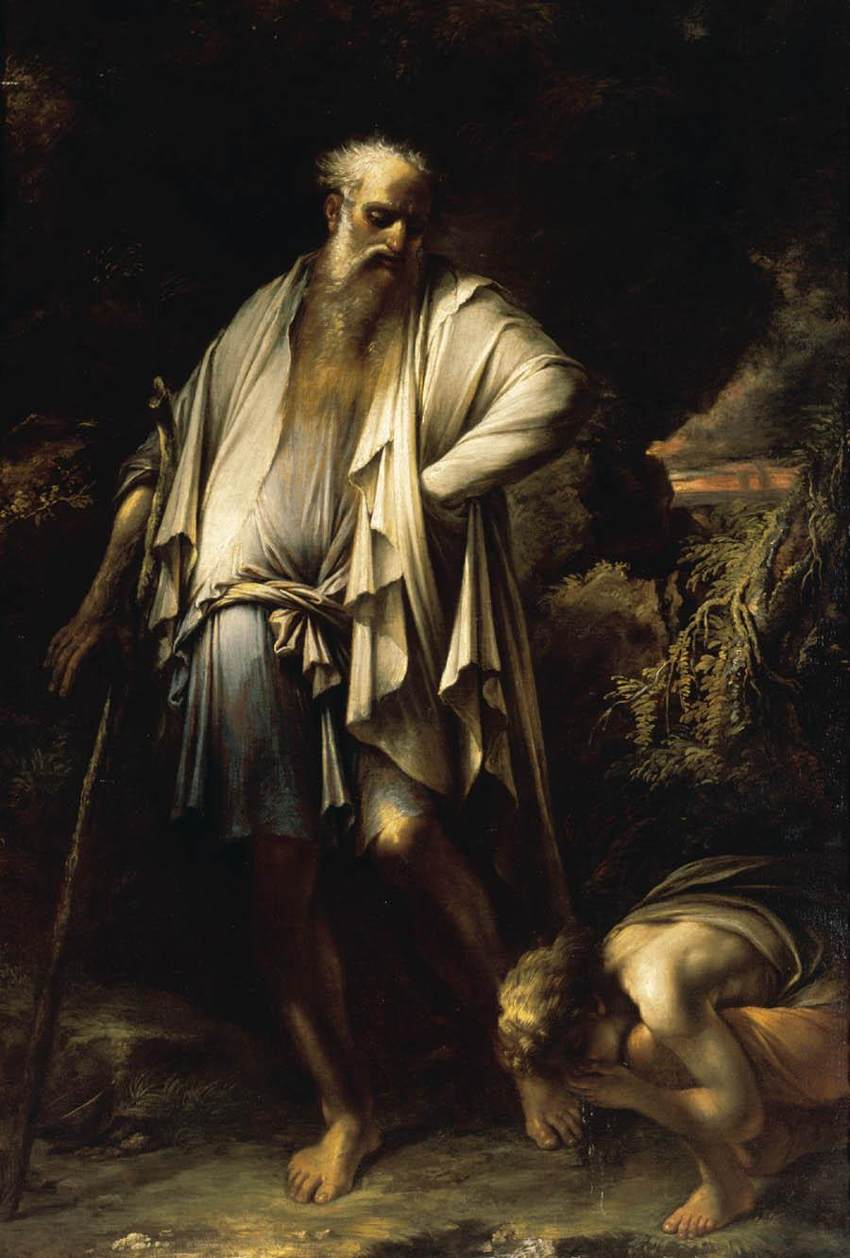
Diogenes Casting Away his Cup (1650s), oil on canvas, 219 x 148 cm., private collection

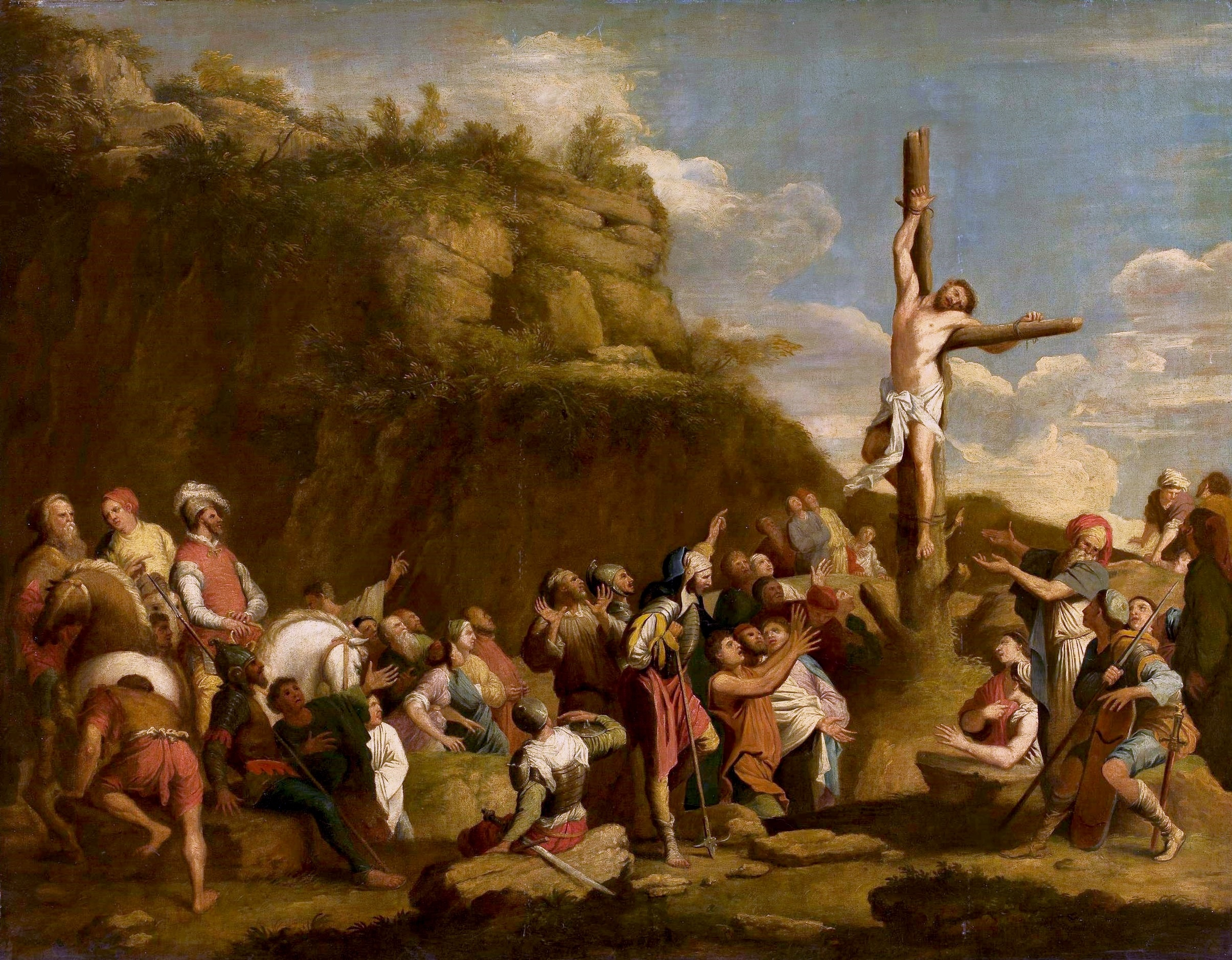
Crucifixion of Polyclitus (1650s), oil on canvas, 108 x 139 cm., National Museum, Warsaw

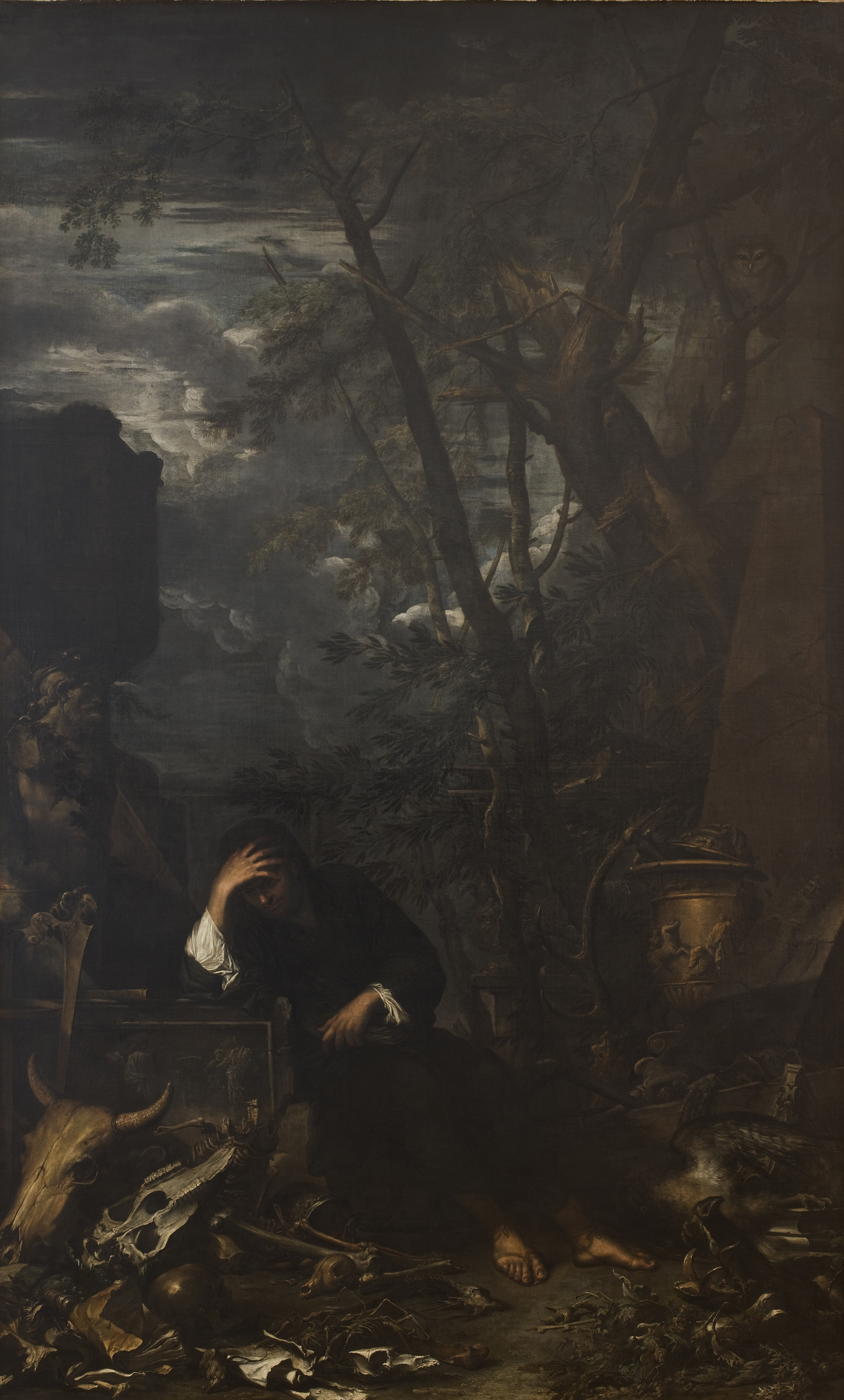
Democritus in Meditation (1650–51), oil on canvas, 344 x 214 cm., National Gallery of Denmark

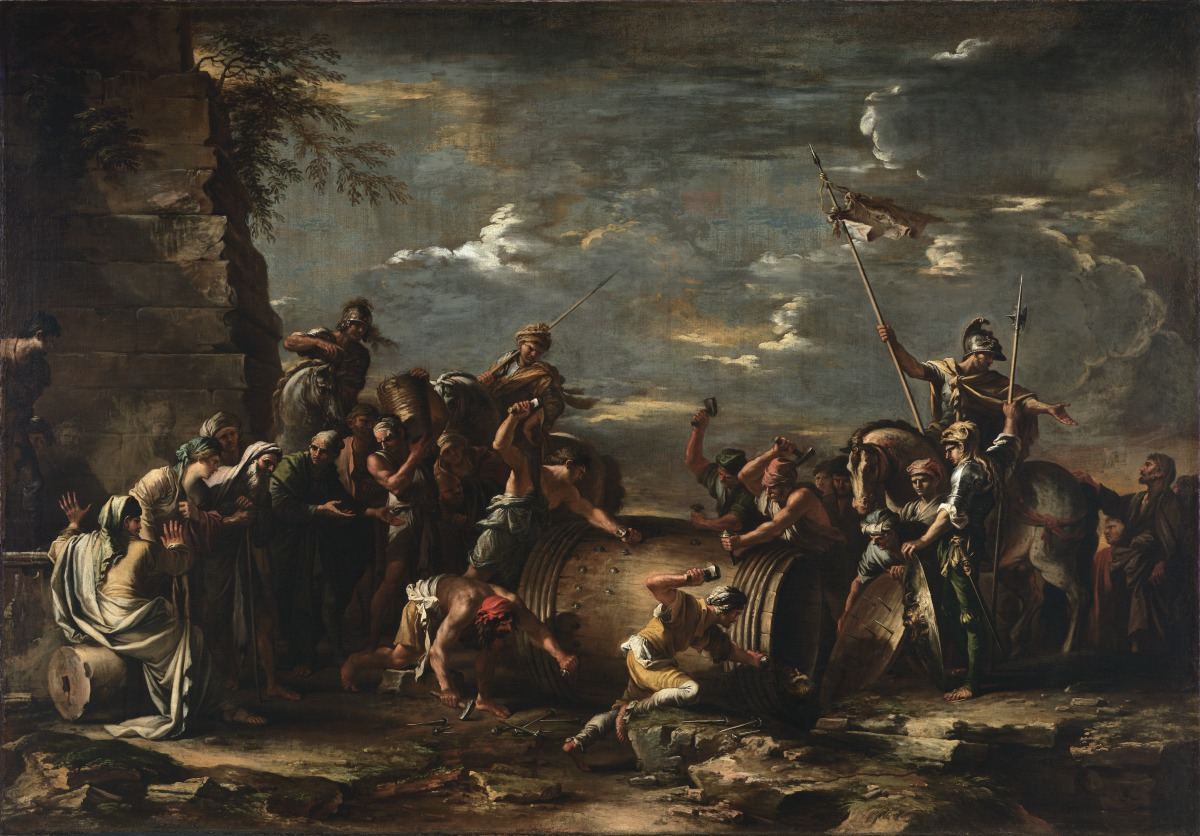
The Death of Regulus (c. 1650–1652), oil on canvas, 152.4 × 219.71 cm., Virginia Museum of Fine Arts

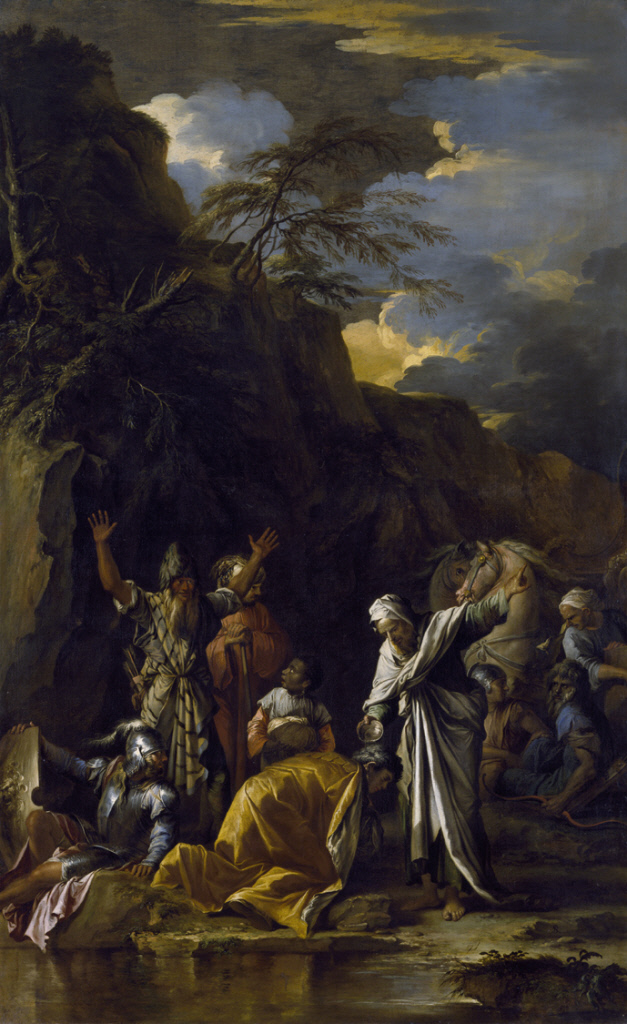
The Baptism of the Eunuch (c. 1660), oil on canvas, 200 x 122 cm., Chrysler Museum of Art

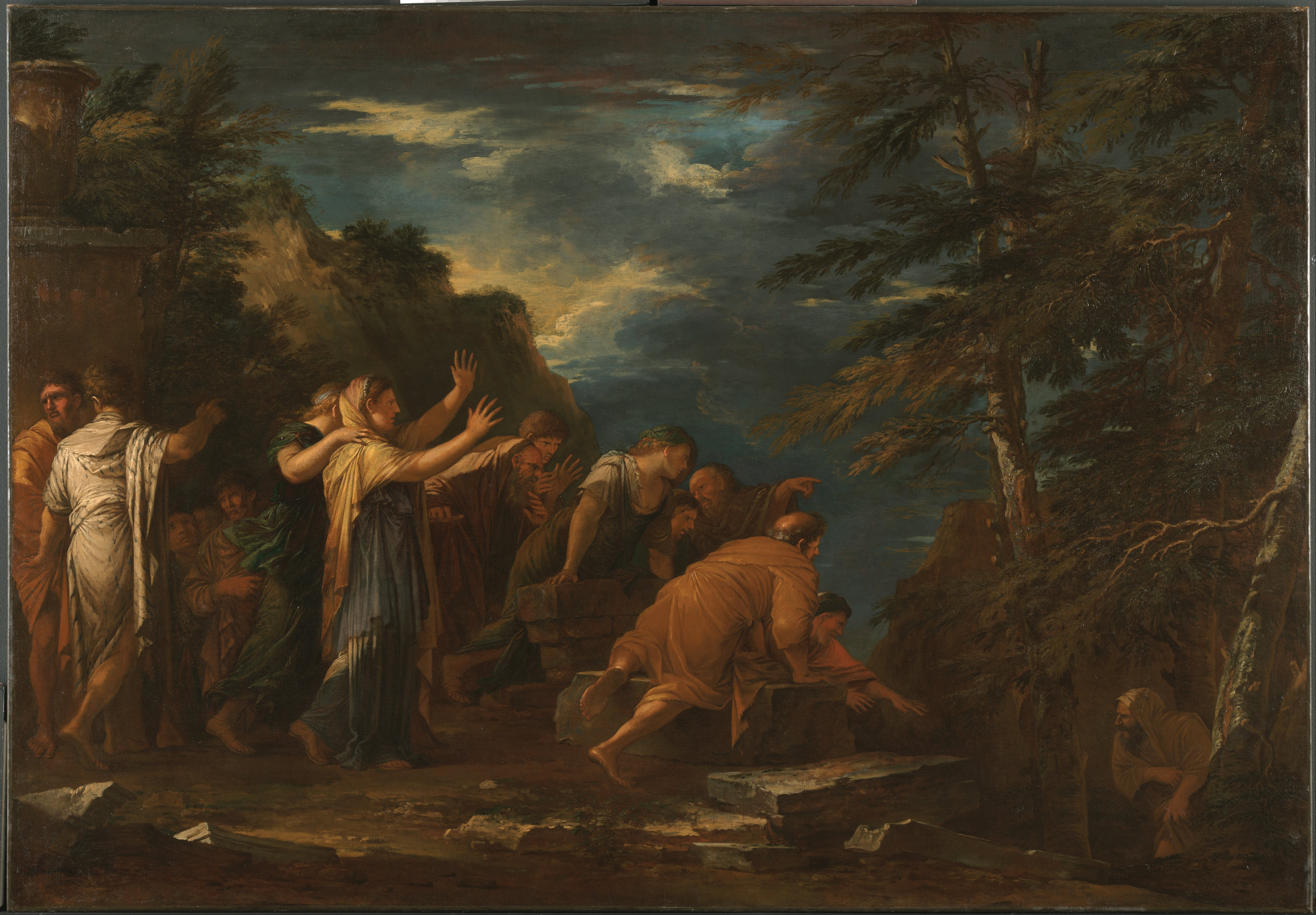
Pythagoras Emerging from the Underworld (1662), oil on canvas, 131 x 189 cm., Kimbell Art Museum

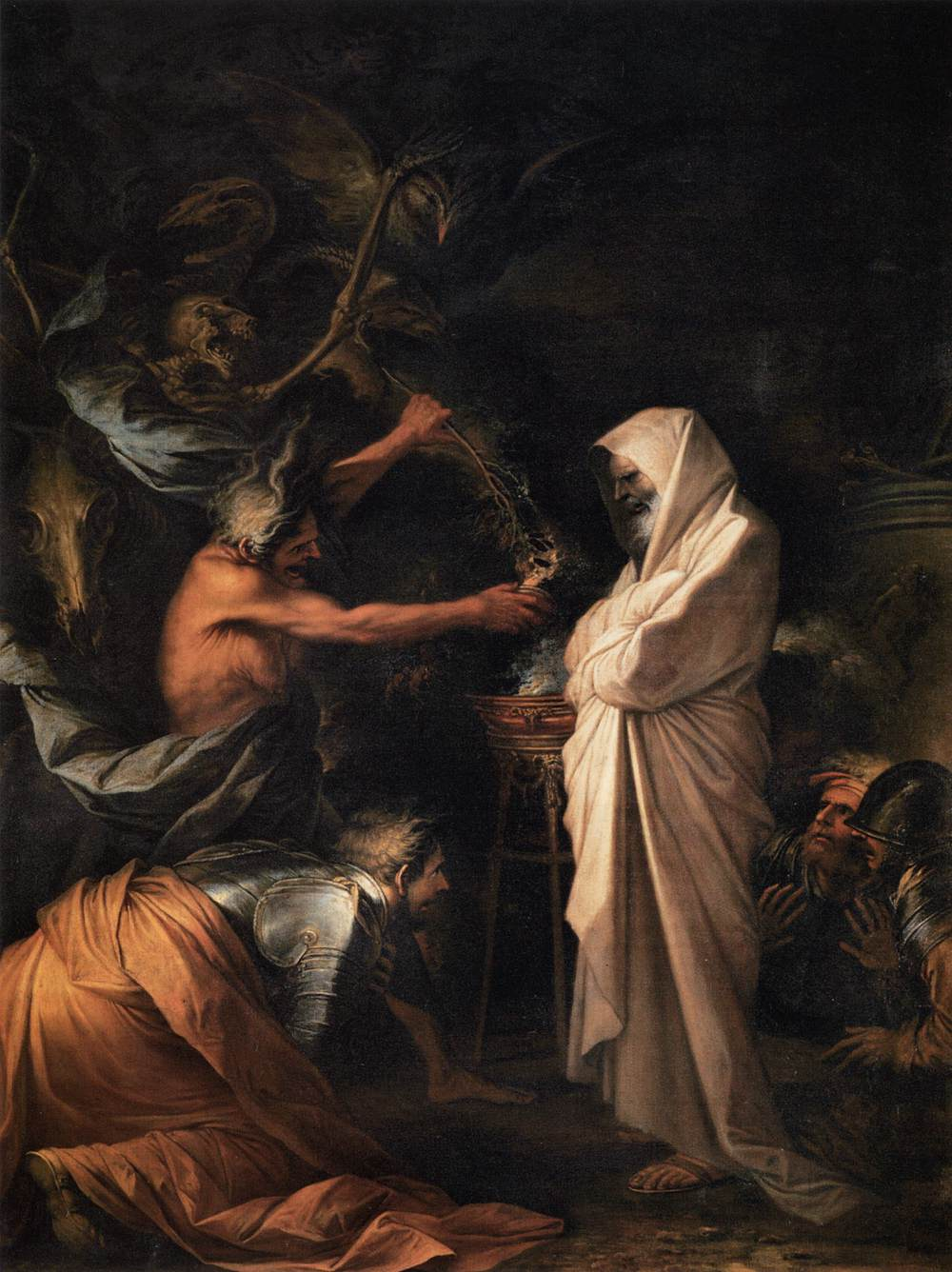
Saul and the Witch of Endor (1668), oil on canvas, 275 x 191 cm., Louvre

=== Landscapes ===
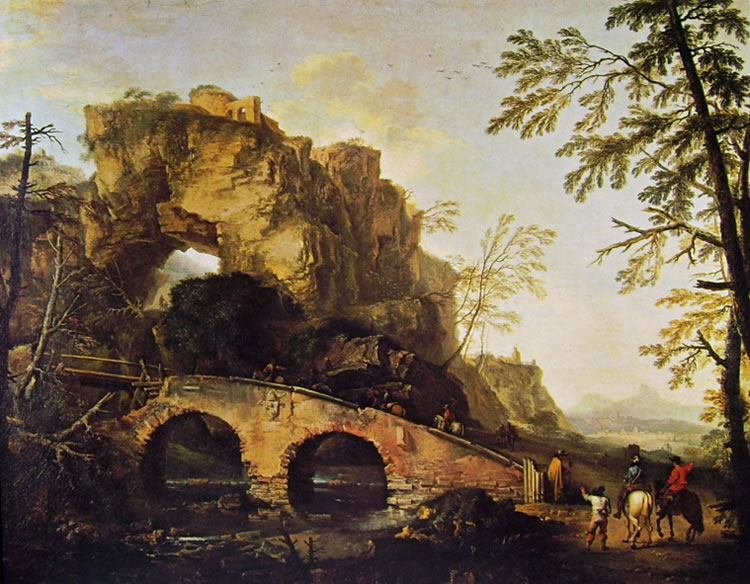
Landscape with a Bridge (1645–1649), oil on canvas, 106 x 127 cm., Galleria Palatina

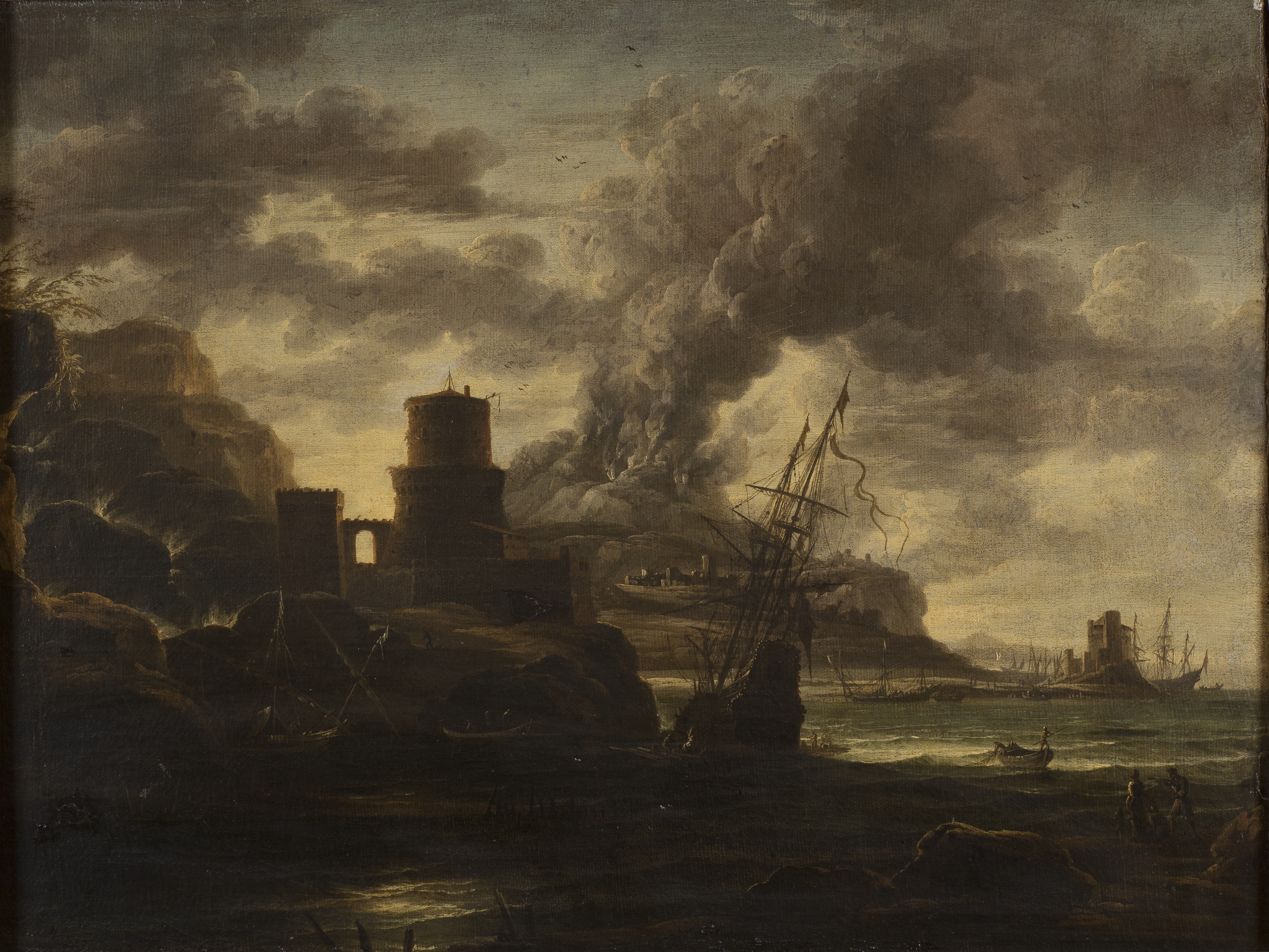
Harbour Scene (undated), oil on canvas, 72 x 94 cm., Nationalmuseum

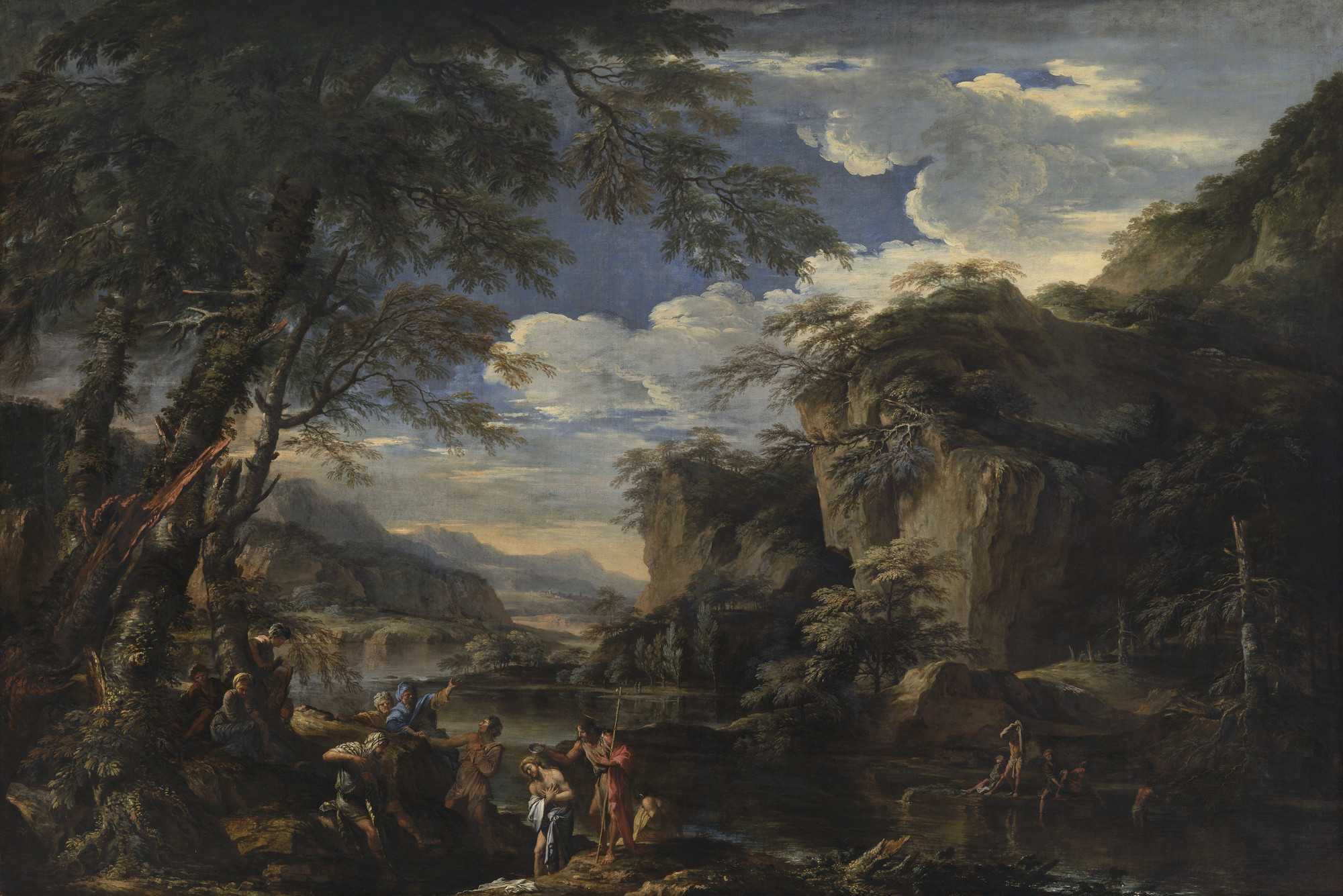
Saint John the Baptist Baptizing Christ in the Jordan (c. 1655) oil on canvas, 173 x 258.7 cm., Kelvingrove Art Gallery and Museum

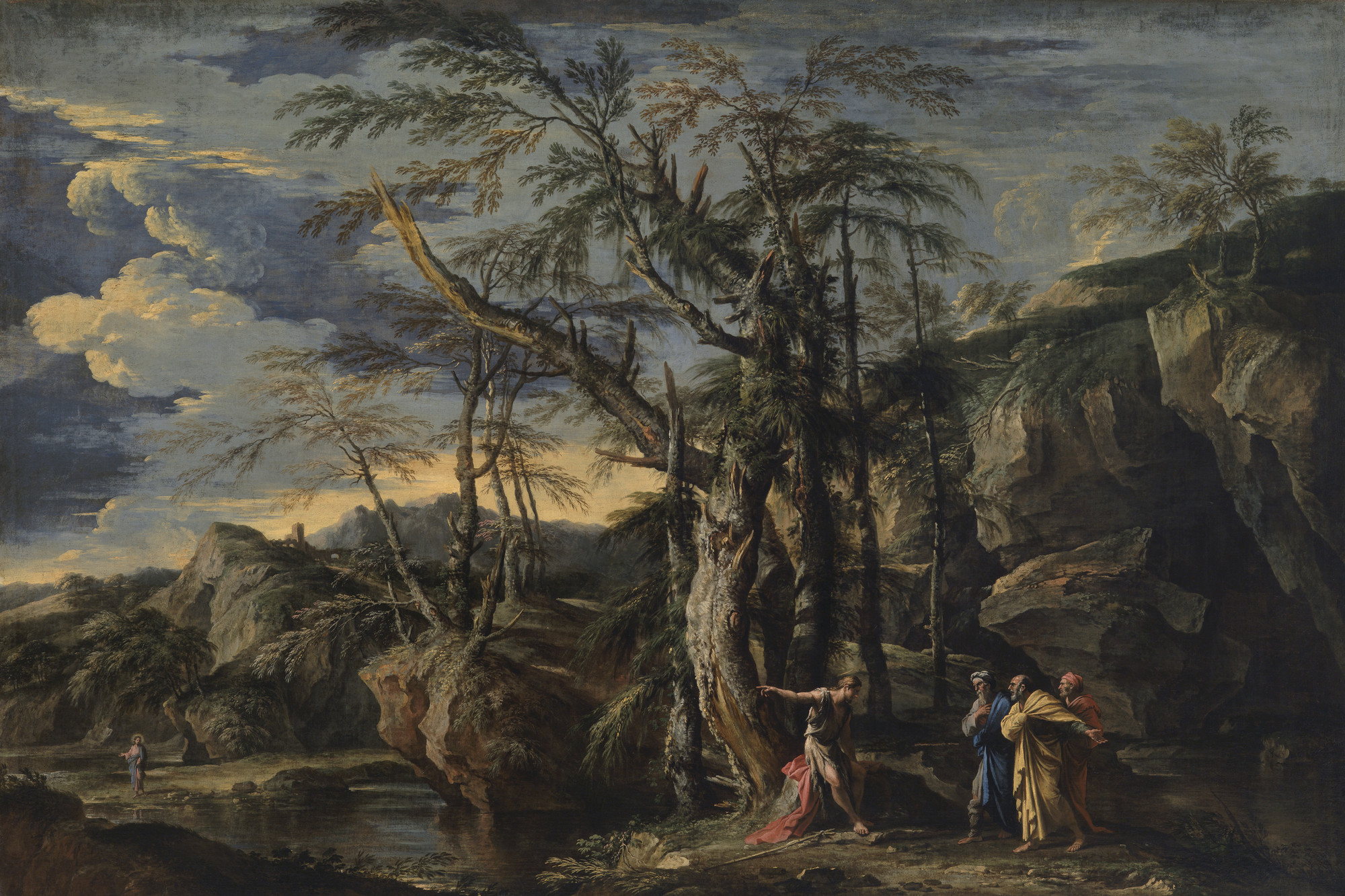
Saint John the Baptist Revealing Christ to the Disciples (c. 1655) oil on canvas, 173.4 x 260.7 cm., Kelvingrove Art Gallery and Museum

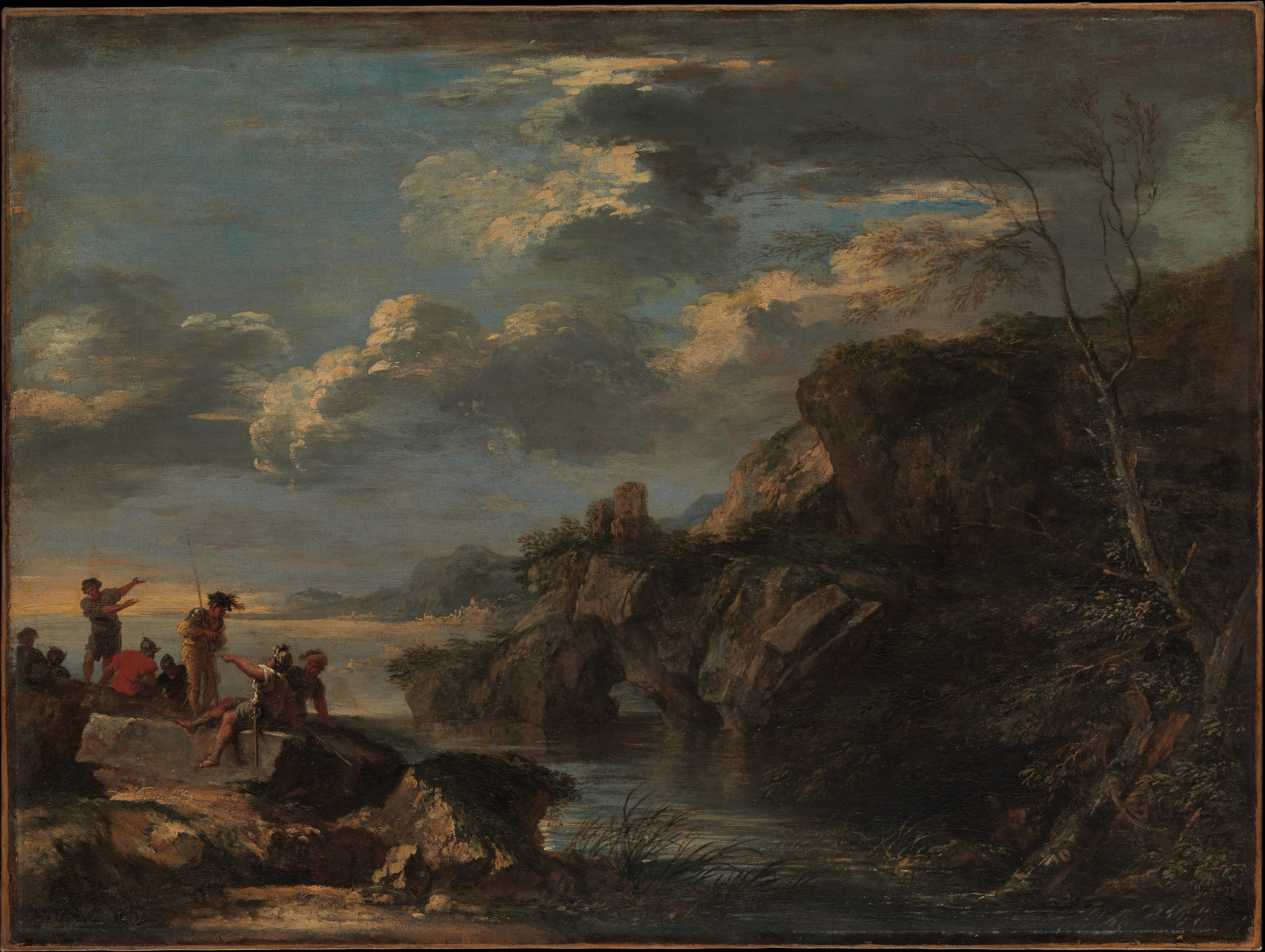
Bandits on a Rocky Coast (c. 1655), oil on canvas, 74.9 x 100 cm., Metropolitan Museum of Art

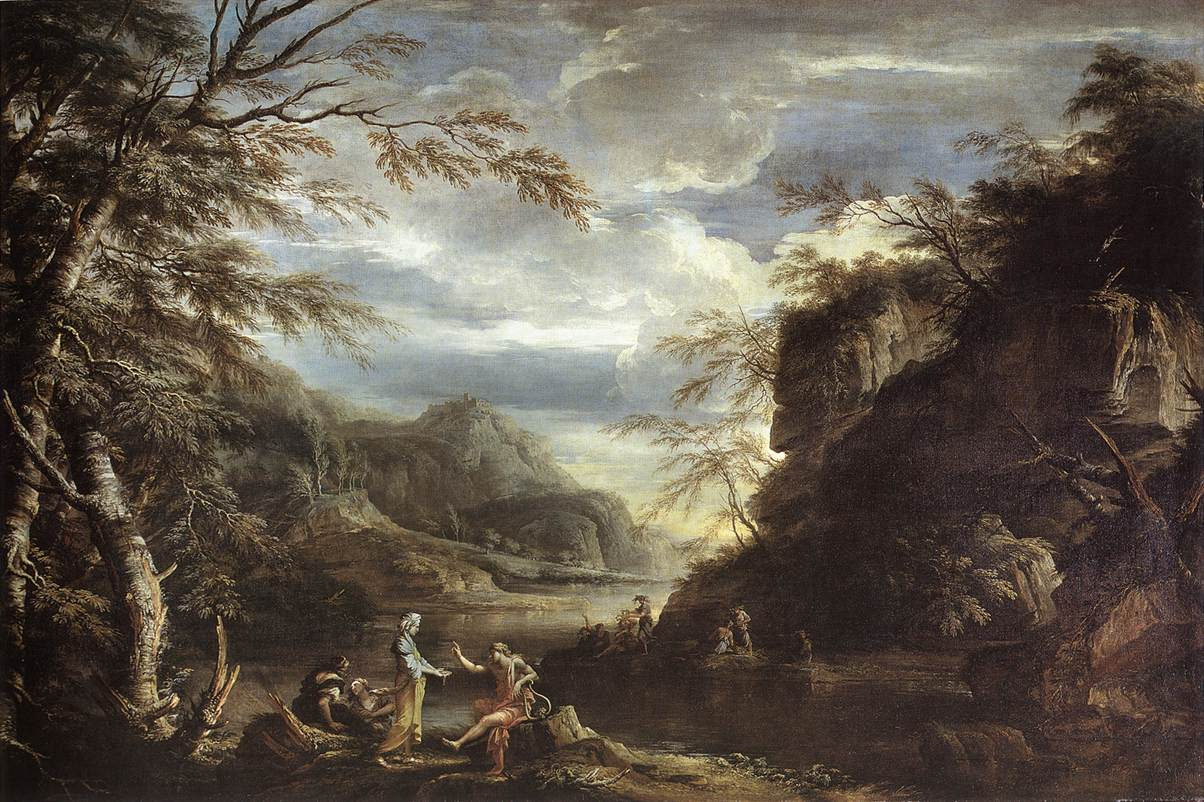
Apollo and the Cumean Sibyl (1657–58), oil on canvas, 173.7 x 259.5 cm., Wallace Collection

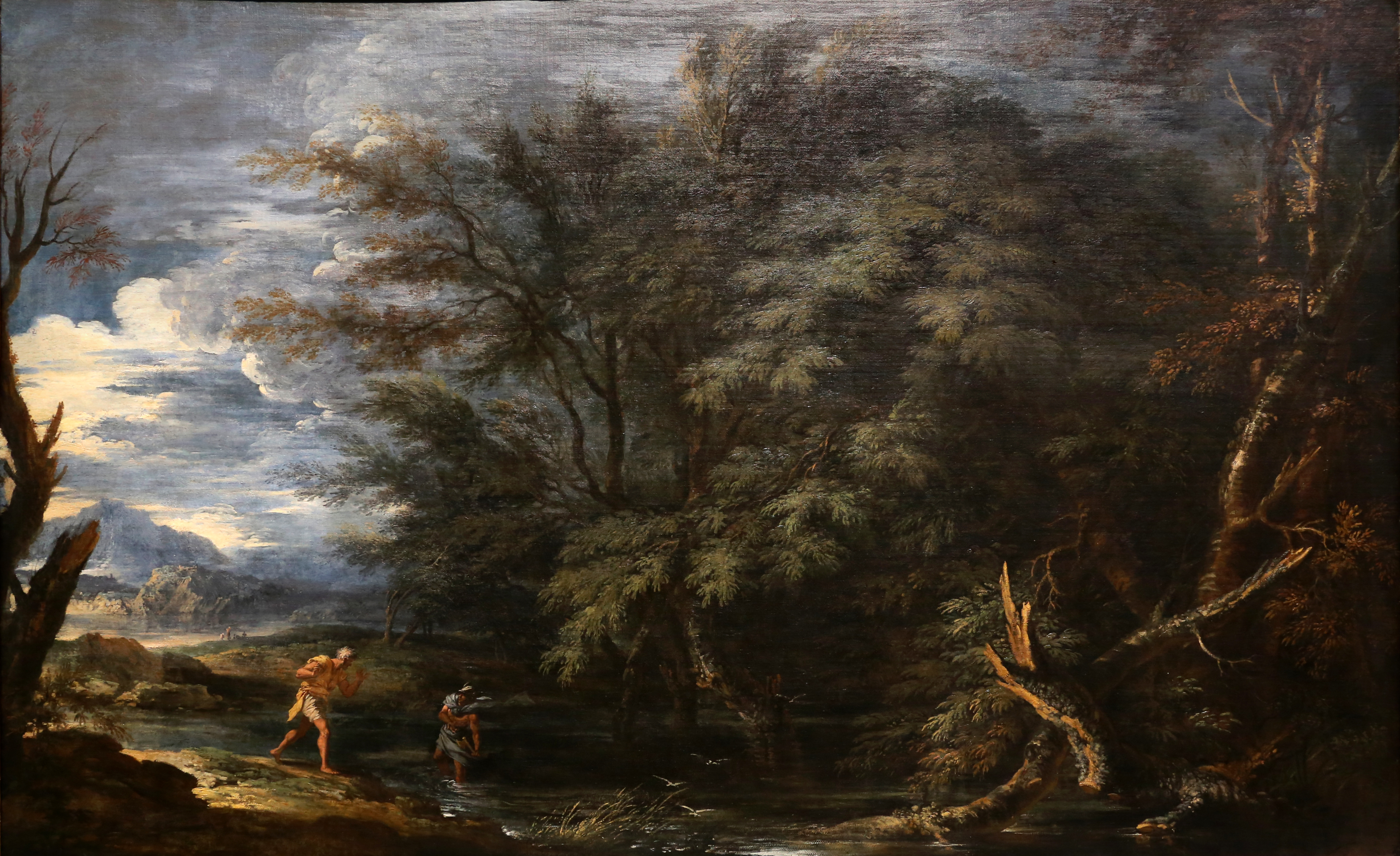
Mercury and the Dishonest Woodsman (ca. 1663), oil on canvas, 125.7 x 202.1 cm., National Gallery

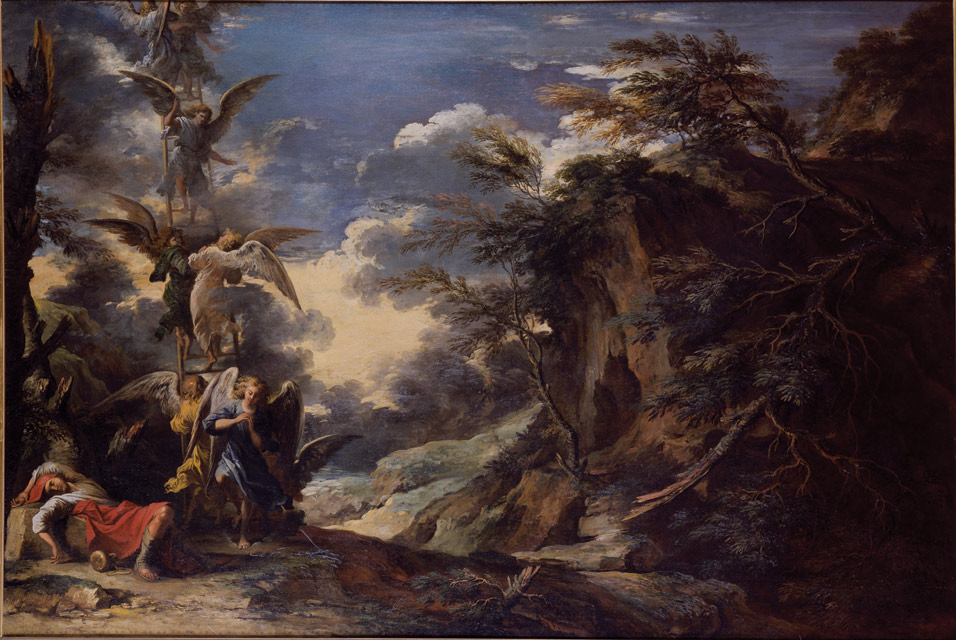
Jacob's Dream (c. 1665), oil on canvas, 137 x 200 cm., Derbyshire, Chatsworth, Devonshire collection

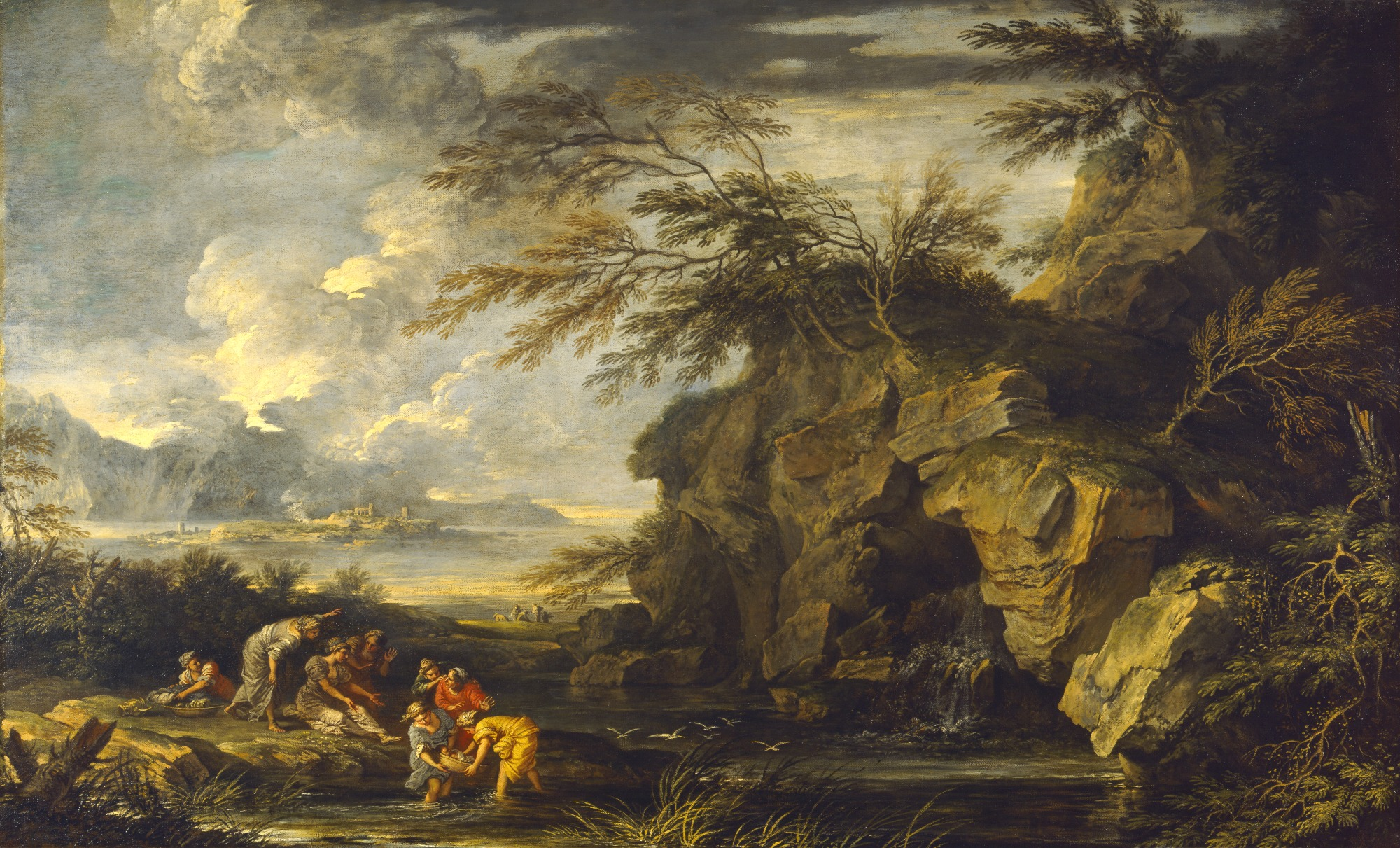
The Finding of Moses (1660–1665), oil on canvas, 123.2 × 202.6 cm., Detroit Institute of Arts

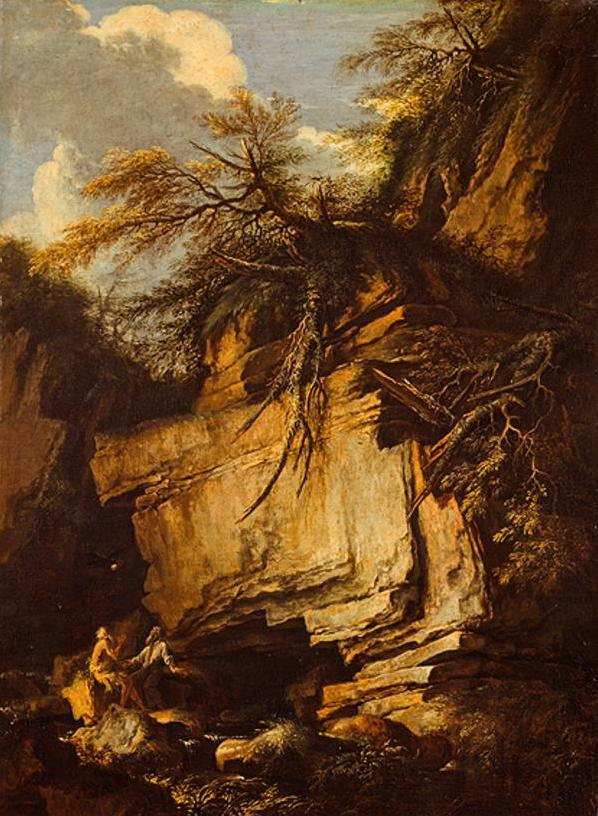
St. Anthony Abbot and St. Paul the Hermit (c. 1660–1665), oil on canvas, 67.3 x 49.9 cm., National Gallery of Scotland

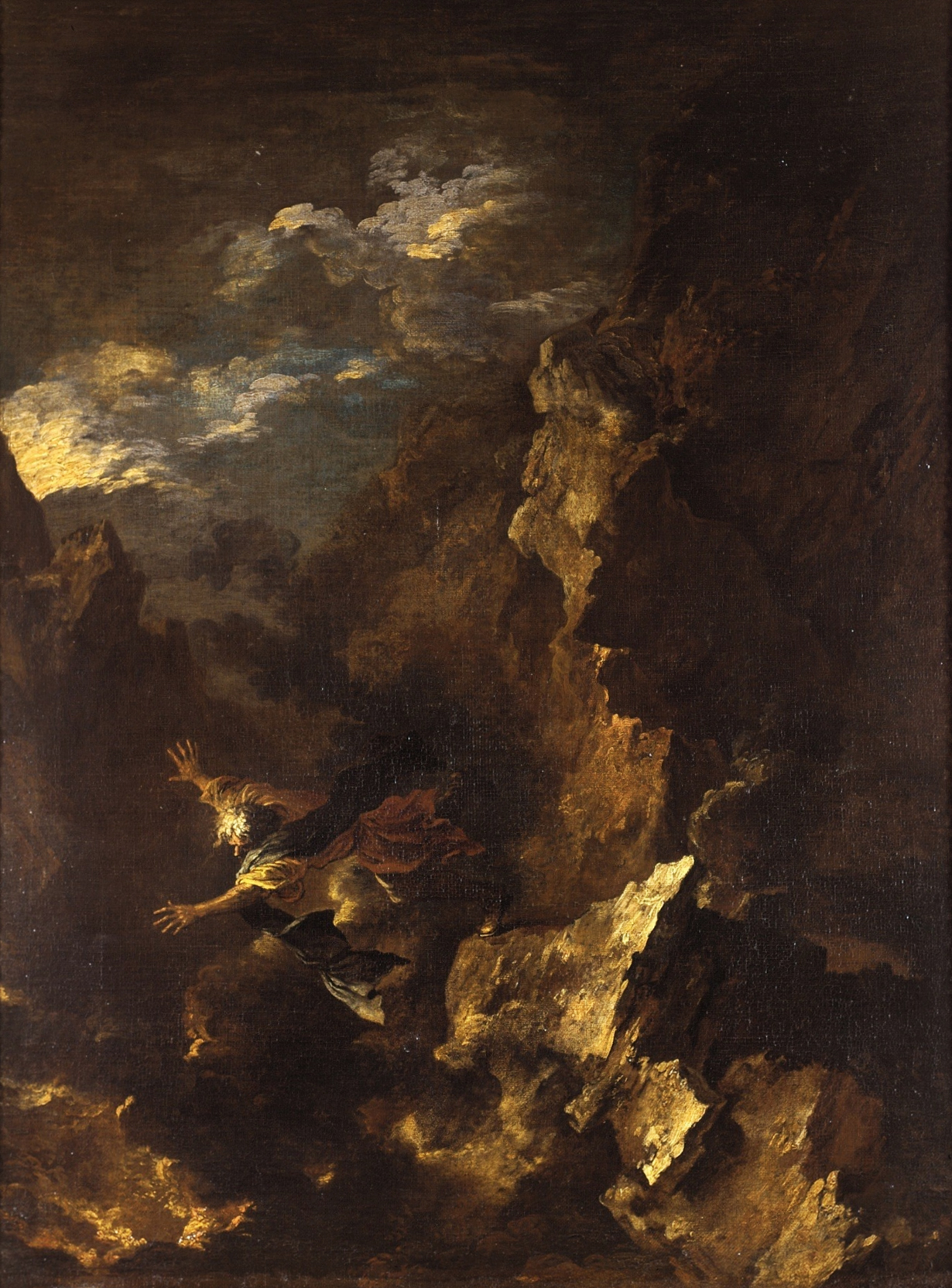
The Death of Empedocles (c. 1665–1670), oil on canvas, 135 x 99 cm., private collection

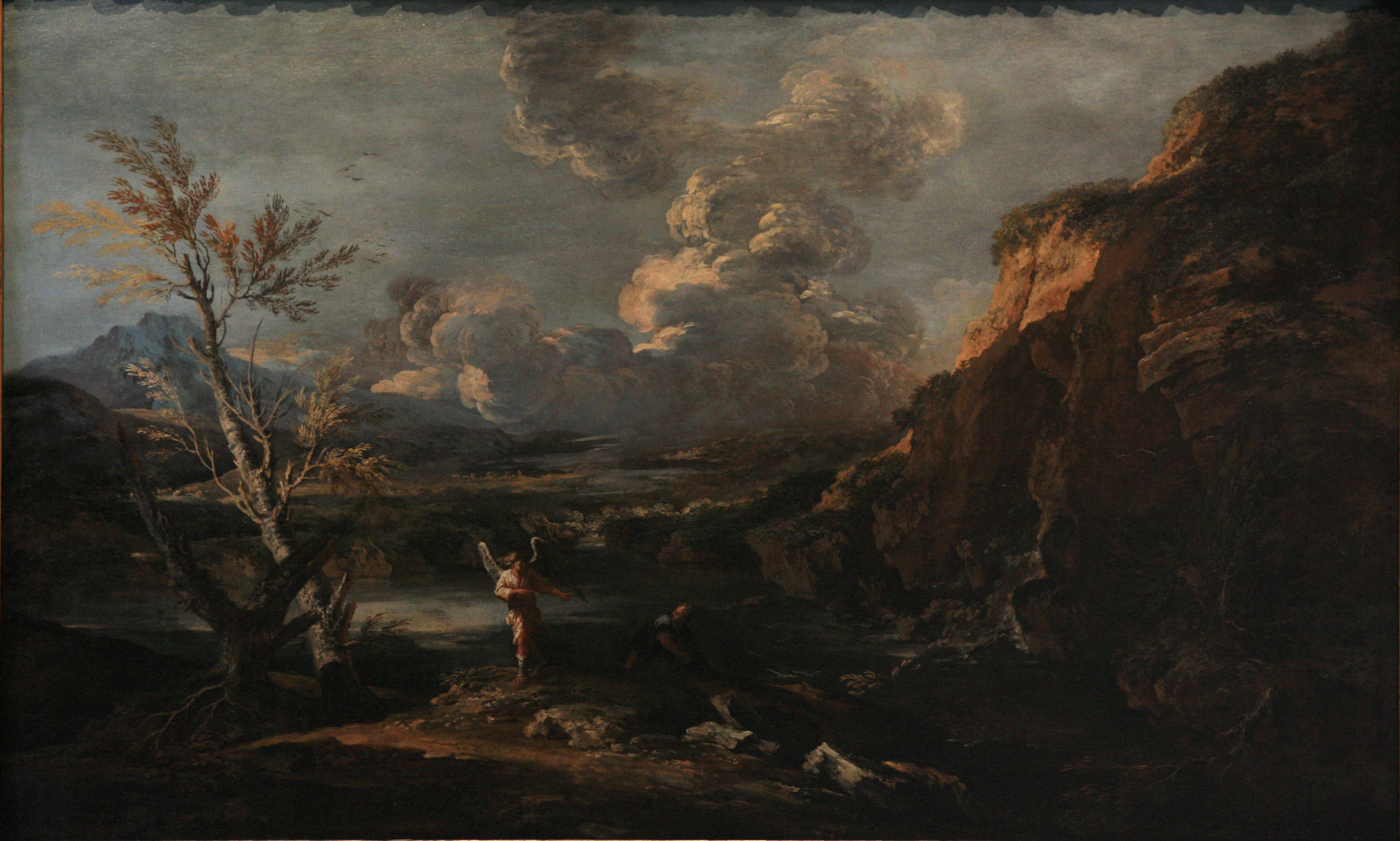
Tobias and the Angel (c. 1670), oil on canvas, 121 x 195 cm., Musée des Beaux-Arts de Strasbourg

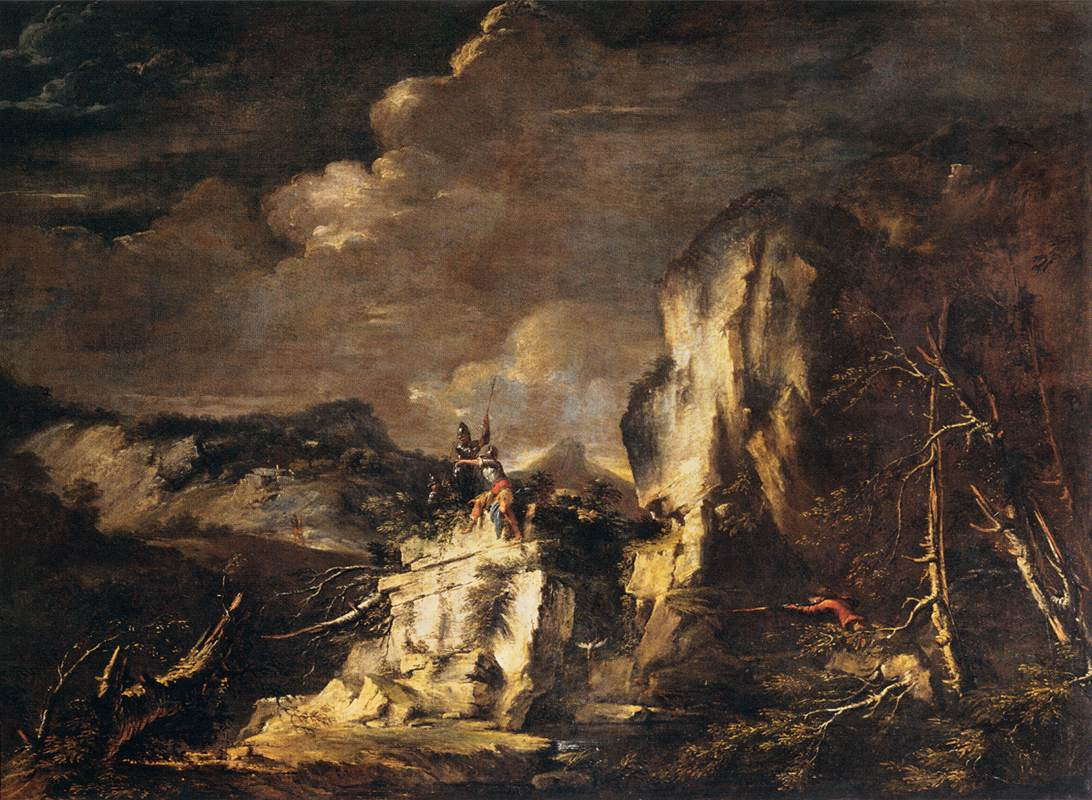
Rocky Landscape with a Huntsman and Warriors (c. 1670), oil on canvas, 142 x 192 cm., Louvre

=== Drawings ===
All drawings are undated: pen, ink, and wash; or pen, ink, wash, and chalk on paper

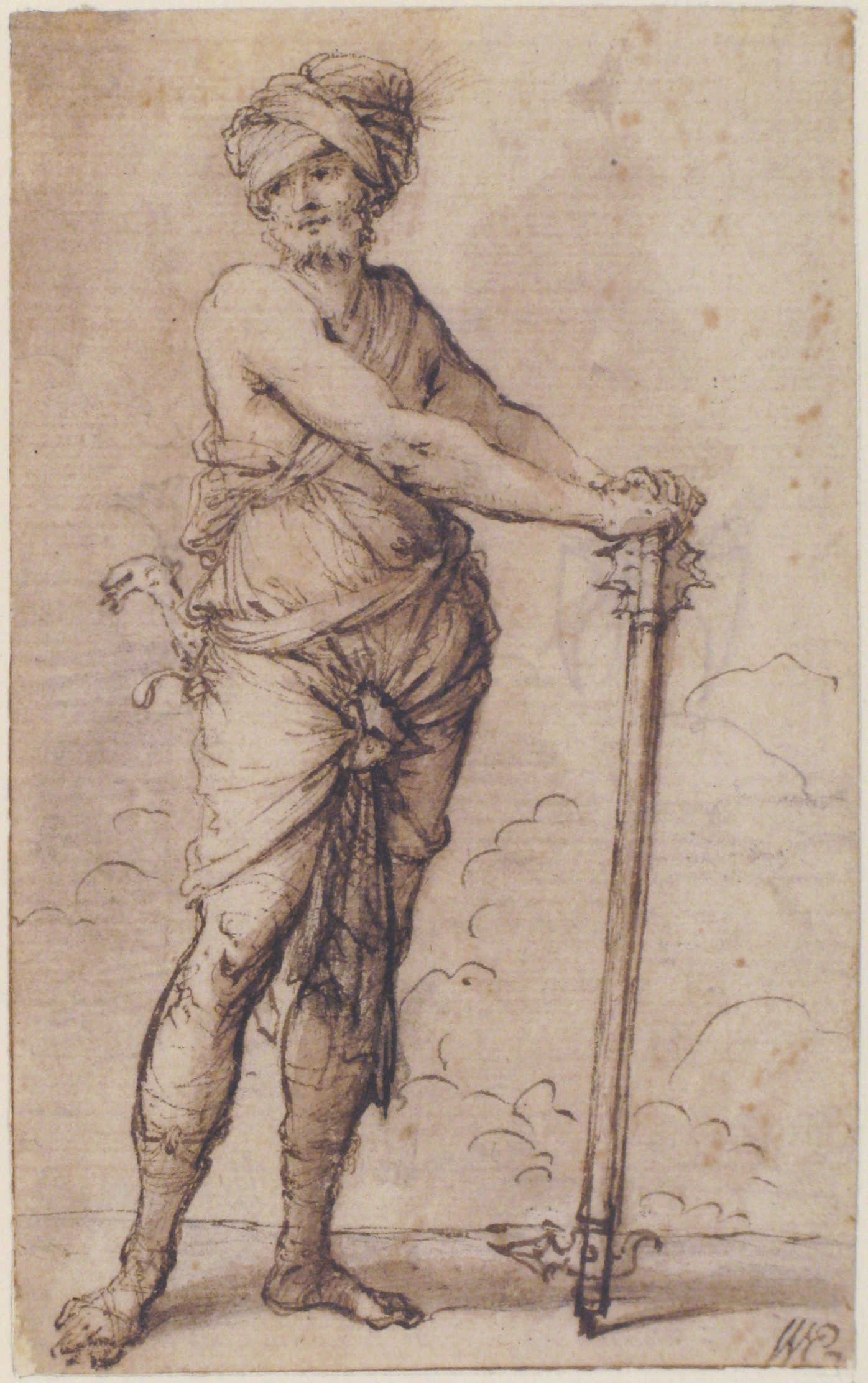
Turbaned Warrior Holding a Mace (13.2 x 8.2 cm.), Metropolitan Museum of Art

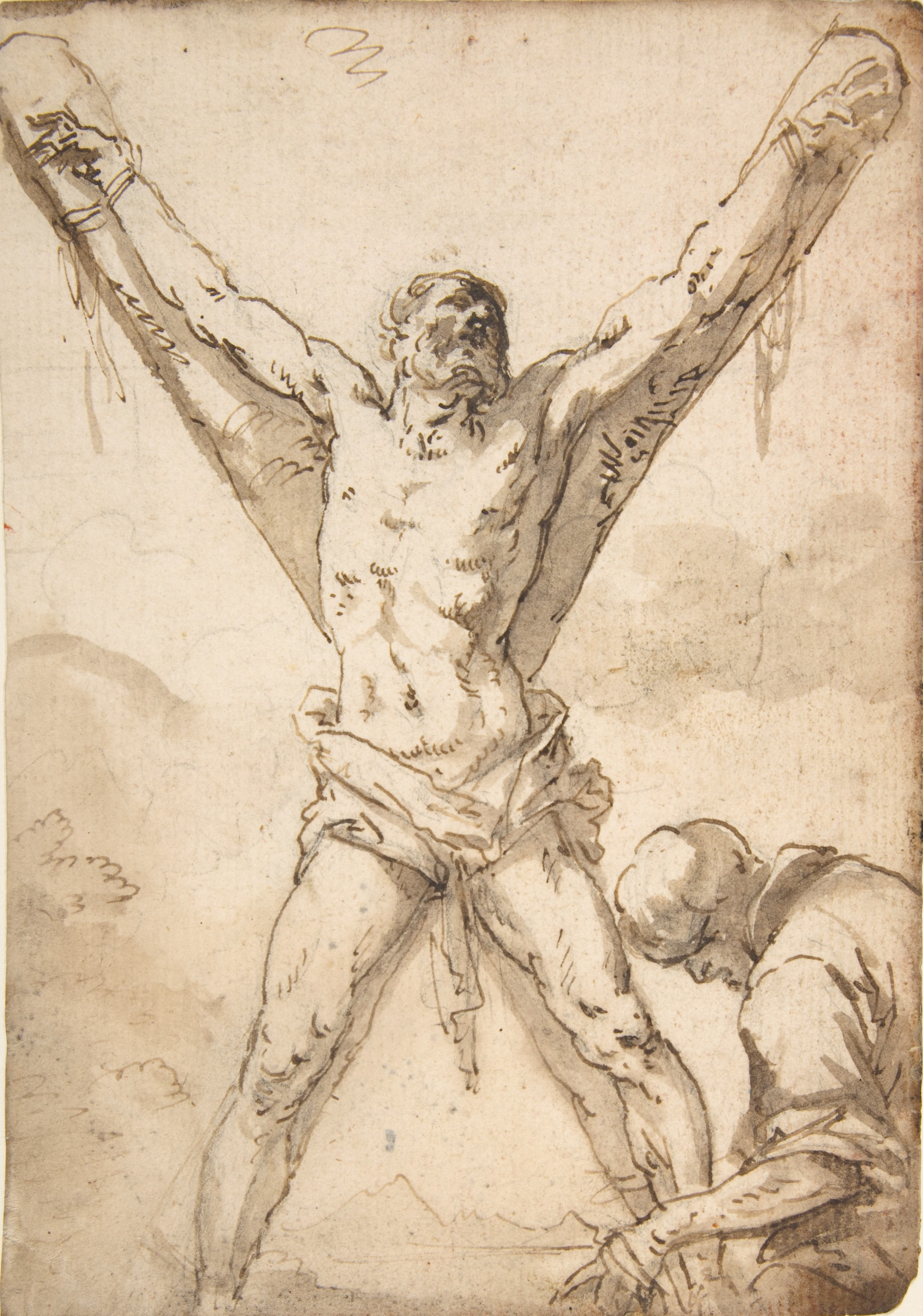
Martyrdom of St. Andrew (19.8 x 13.7 cm.), Metropolitan Museum of Art

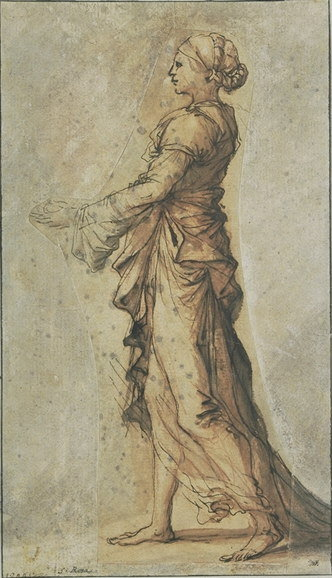
Woman standing draped (25.4 x 14.7 cm.), Louvre

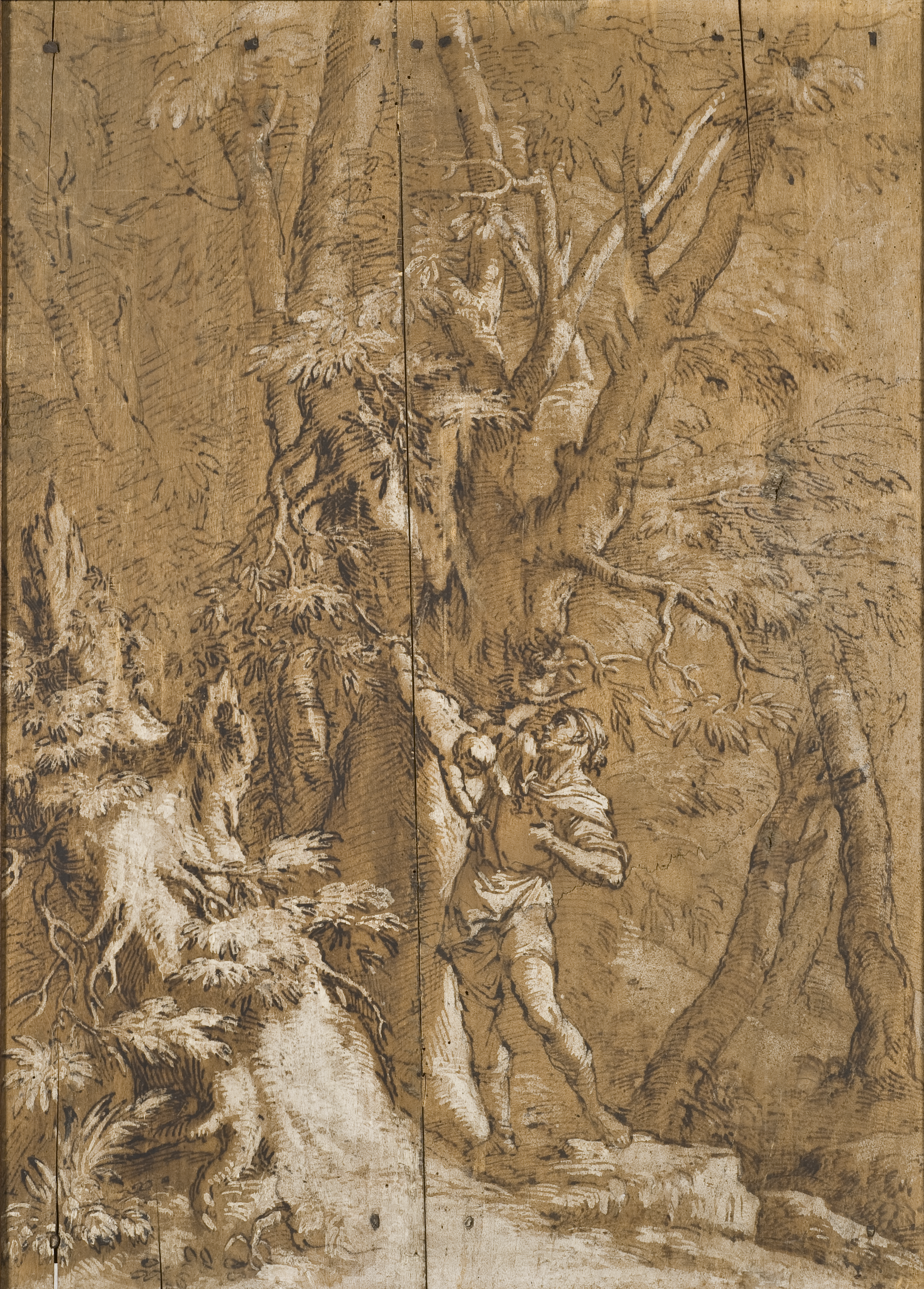
Oedipus Abandoned (65 x 45 cm.), Nationalmuseum

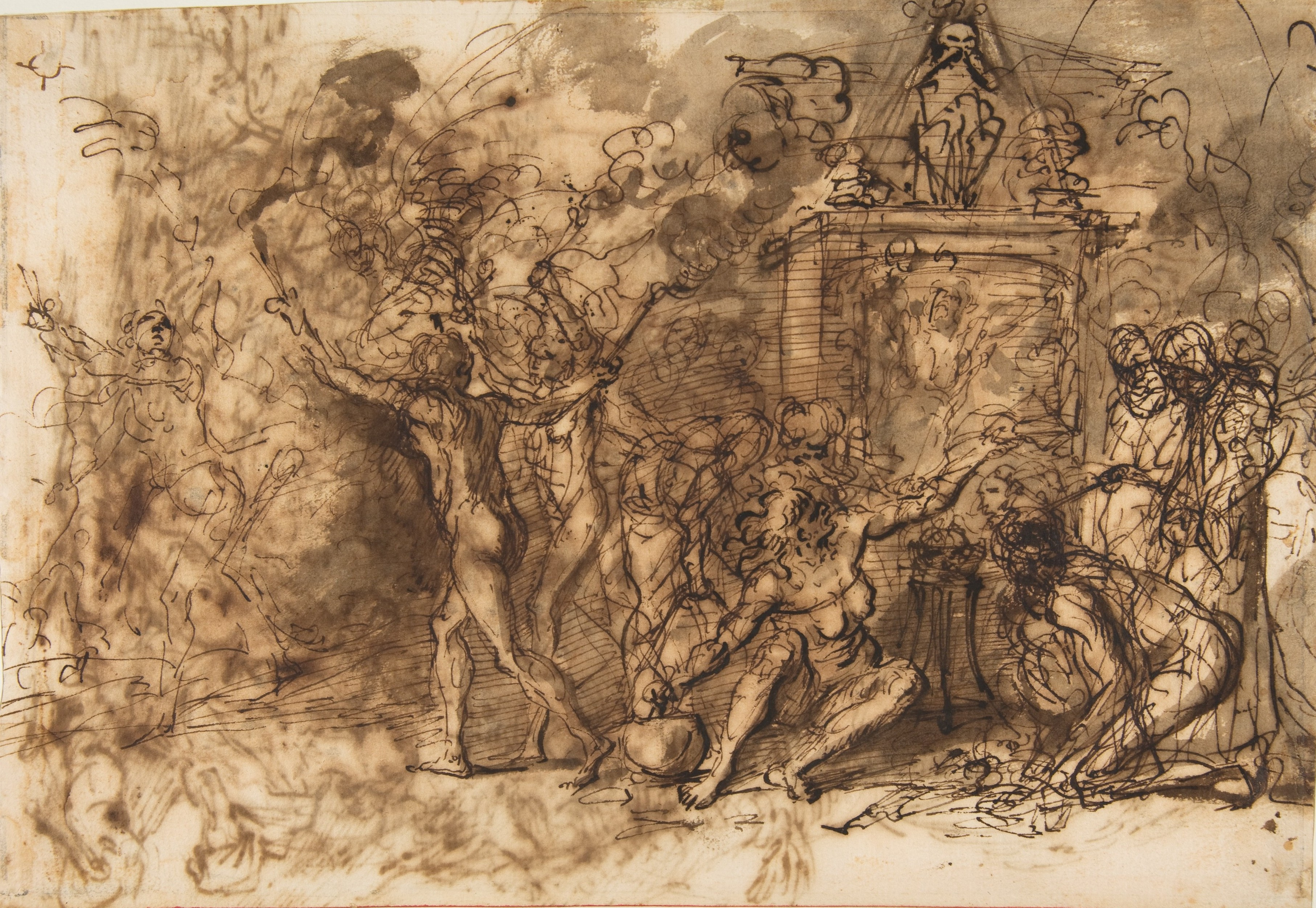
Witches' Sabbath (21.8 x 31.7 cm.), Metropolitan Museum of Art

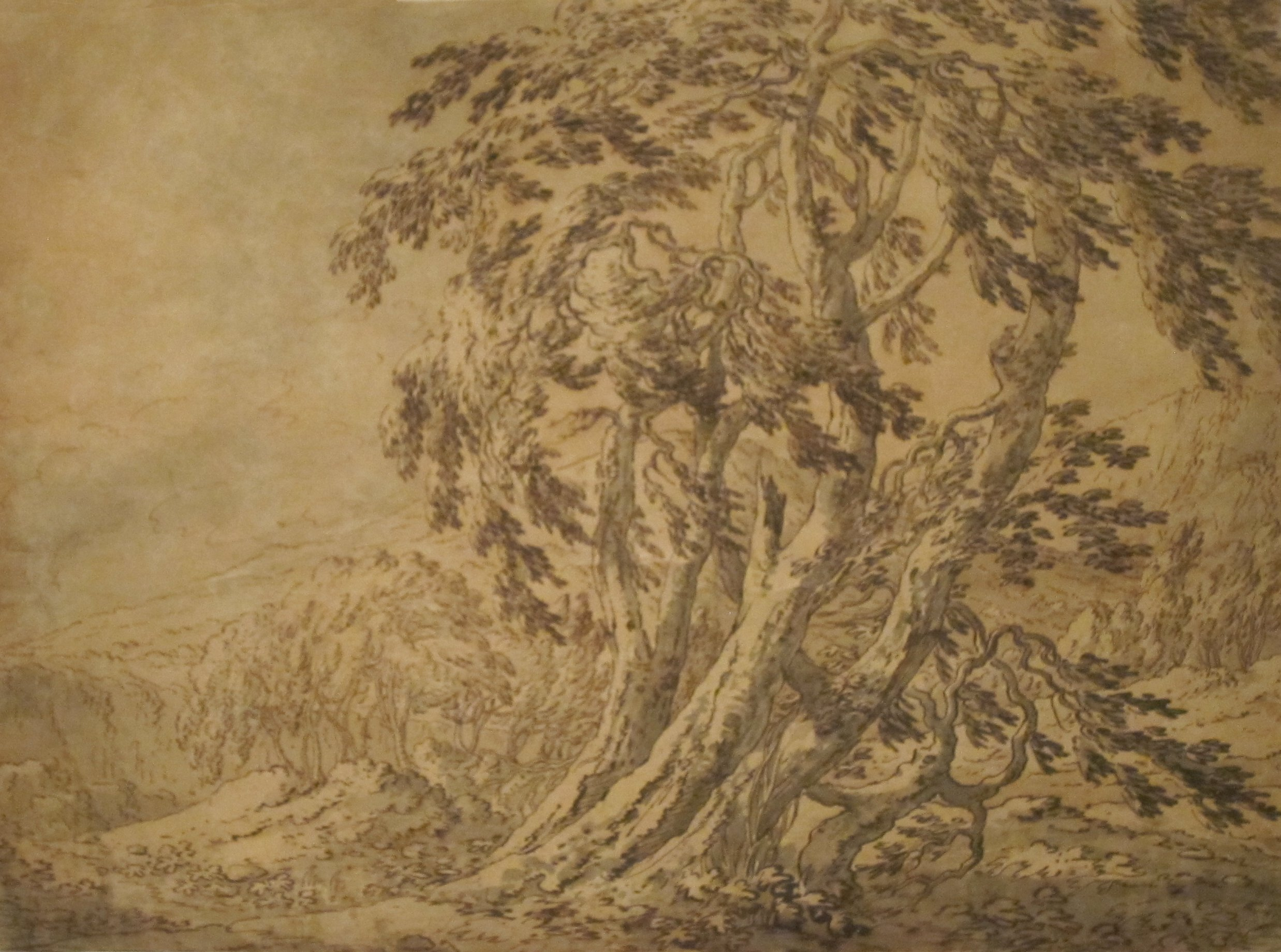
Forest Scene, Honolulu Museum of Art

=== Prints ===
All prints are etchings, or etchings with drypoint

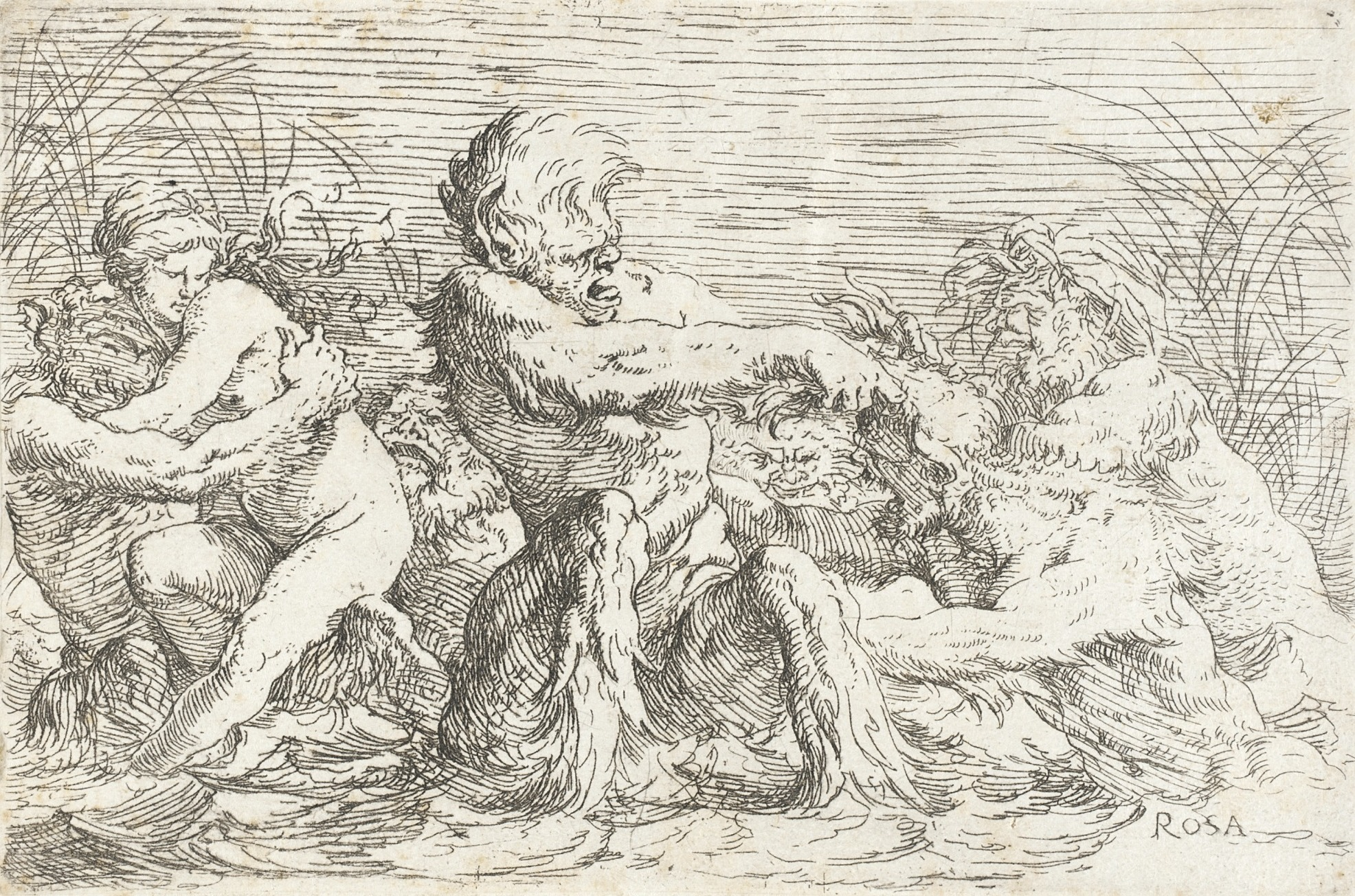
Battling Tritons (1660–61), 11.11 x 16.51 cm.

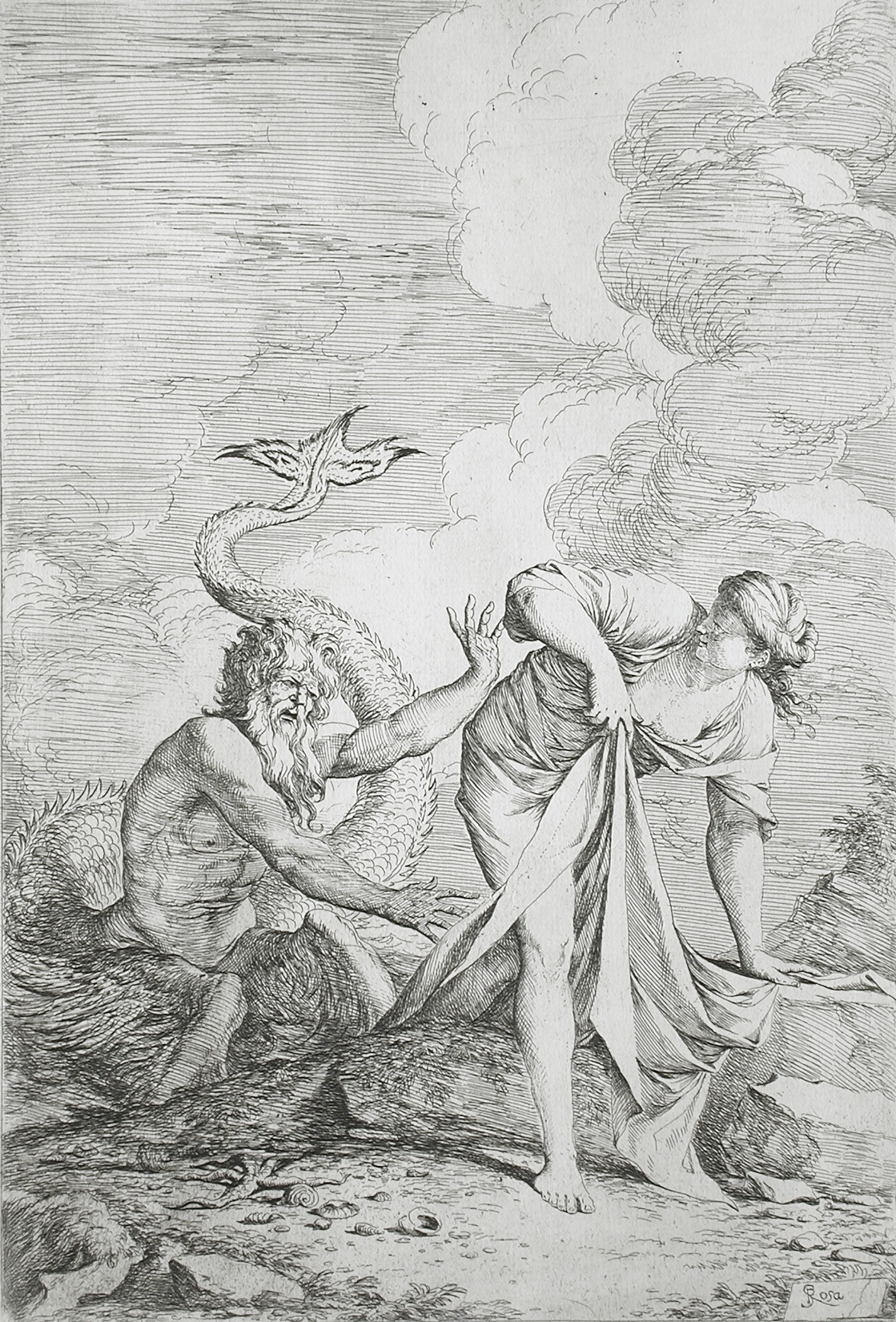
Glaucus and Scylla (1661), 35.24 x 23.5 cm.

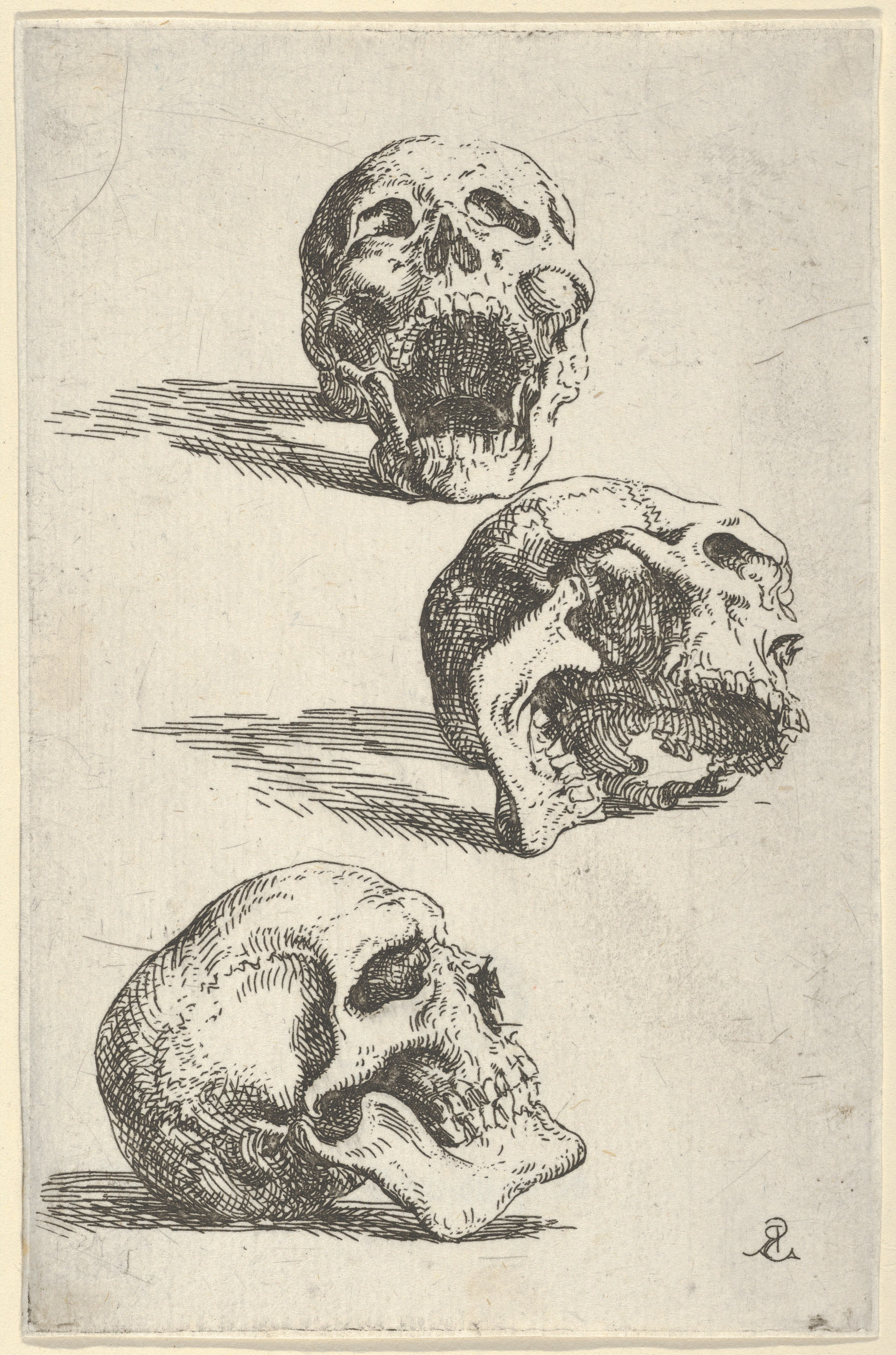
Three Human Skulls (1662), 14.2 × 9.2 cm.

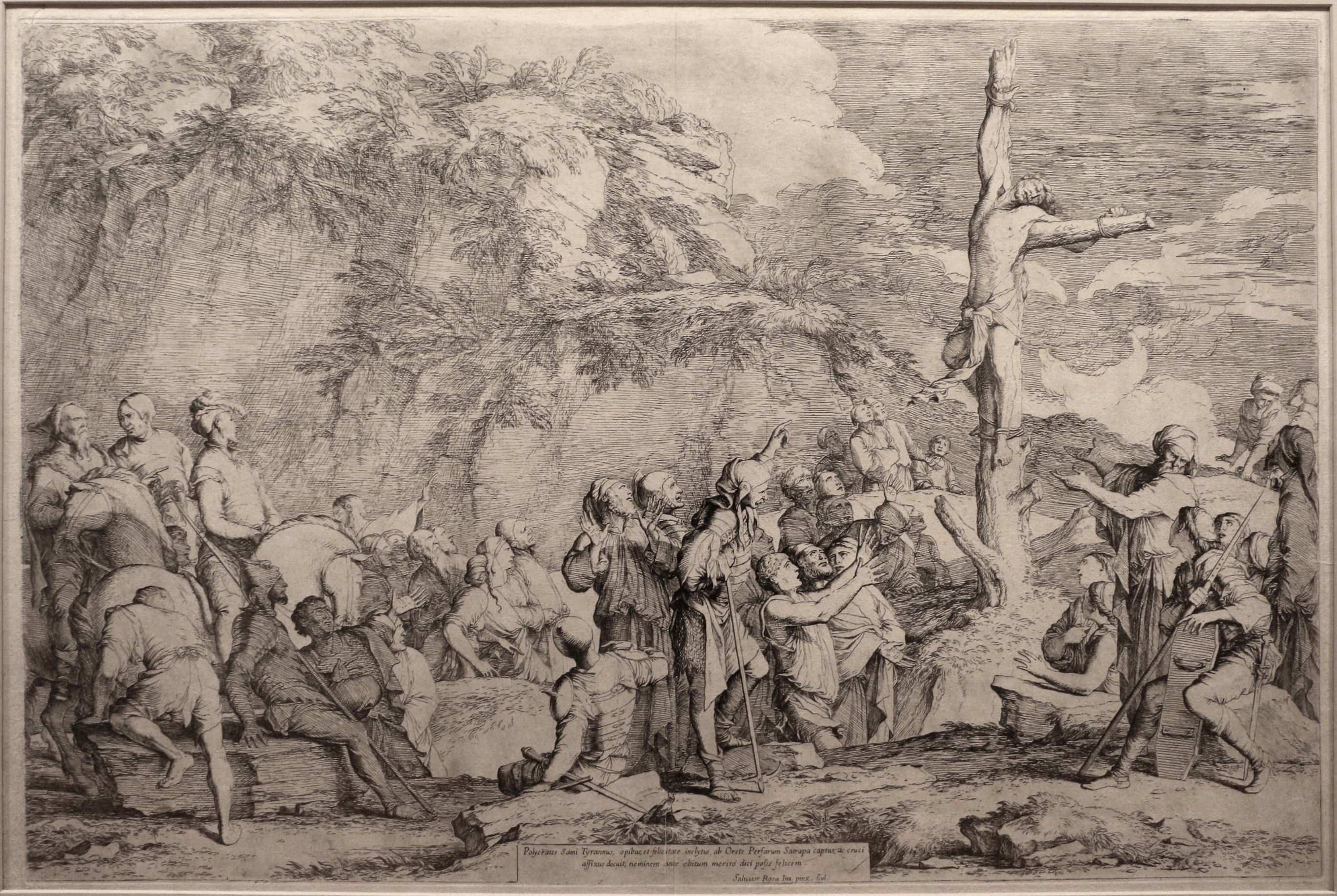
The Crucifixion of Polycrates the Tyrant after his Capture by the Persians (1662), 47.3 x 72.2 cm.

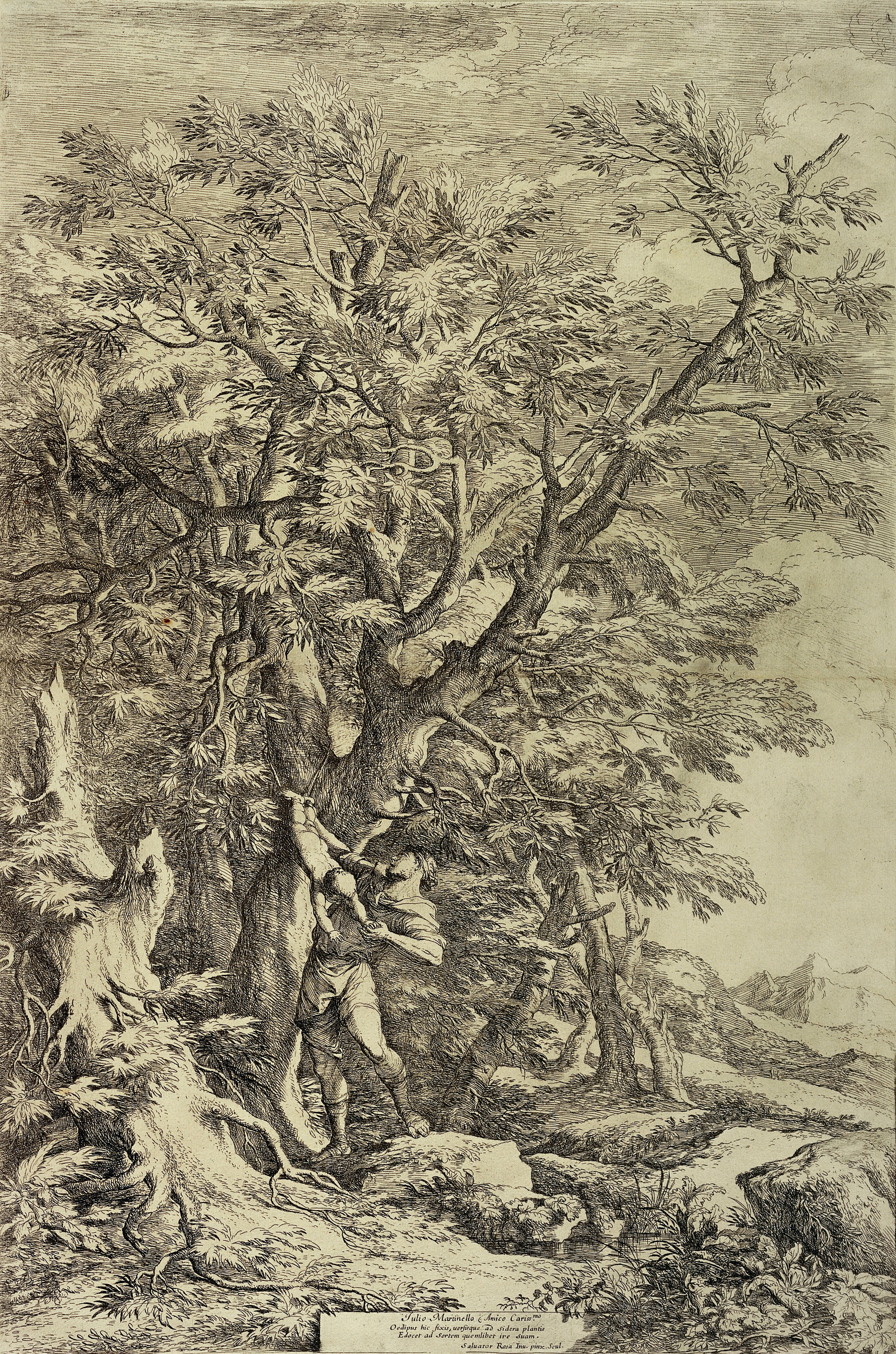
Rescue of the Infant Oedipus (1663), 72.4 x 47.2 cm.

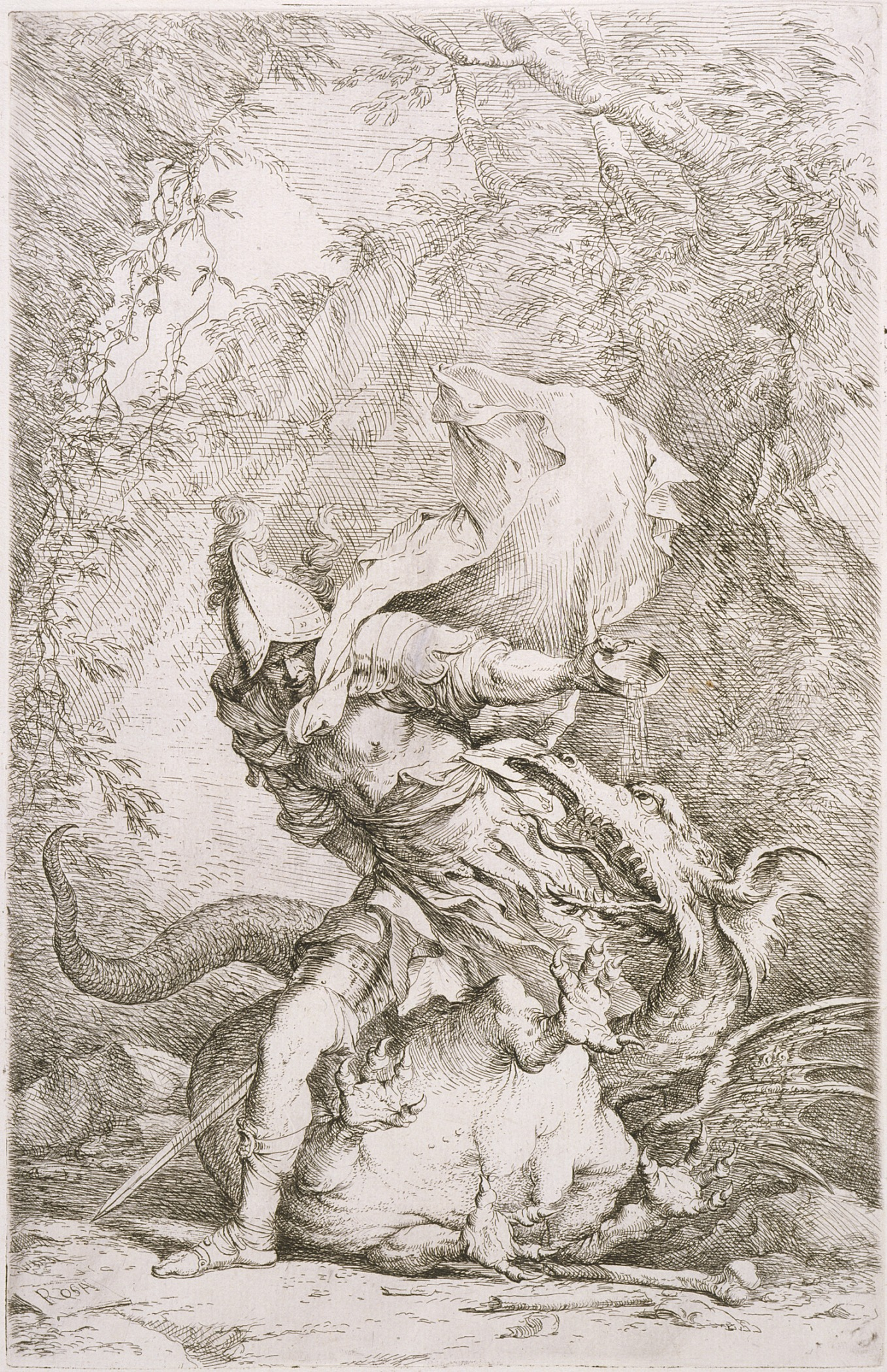
Jason and the Dragon (1663–64), 33.6 x 21.5 cm.

== Works about Rosa ==
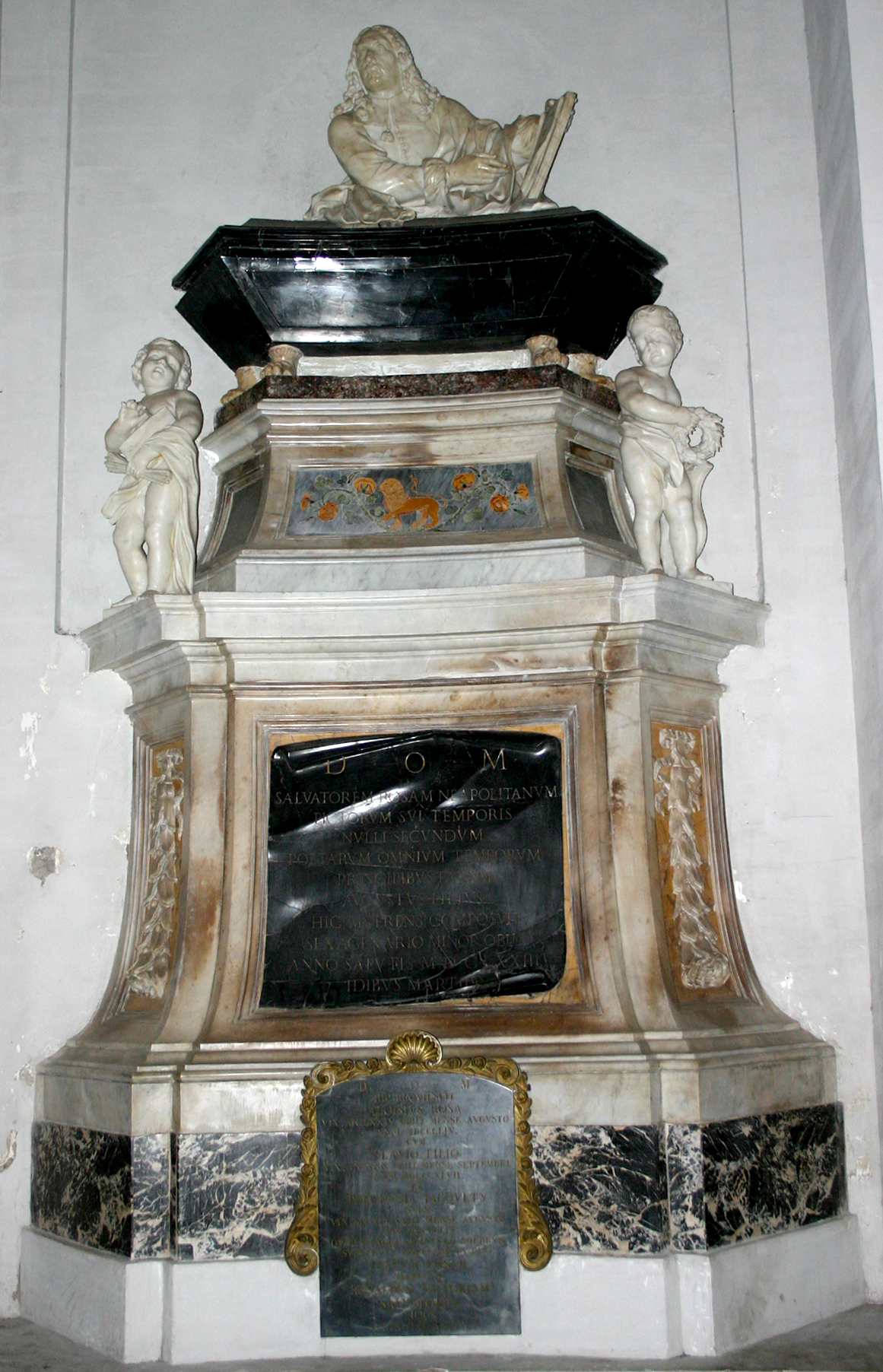
Rosa's tomb

A number of biographies and fictionalisations of the life of Rosa exist:

- Domenico Passeri speaks of him in Vite de Pittori
- Salvini, Satire e Vita di Salvator Rosa
- Bernardo de' Dominici, Vita di Rosa (1742, Naples)
- In England, Lady Morgan in The Life and Times of Salvator Rosa, and Albert Cotton in A Company of Death romanticized his life.
- Rosa is the fictional hero of the novella Signor Formica, 1819, also known simply as Salvator Rosa, by E. T. A. Hoffmann.
- Salvator Rosa is a 19th-century Italian opera by Antônio Carlos Gomes, with libretto by Antonio Ghislanzoni, after the novel Masaniello by Eugène de Mirecourt.
- The 1846 ballet Catarina by the choreographer Jules Perrot and the composer Cesare Pugni was produced in London at Her Majesty's Theatre, and was inspired by the alleged story of Rosa's dealings with Brigands of the Abruzzi.
- One of the pieces included in the piano collection Années de pèlerinage by Franz Liszt is entitled "Canzonetta del Salvator Rosa". That song (Vado ben spesso cangiando loco) was, however, composed by Giovanni Bononcini.
- Salvator Rosa Sketching the Banditi is an 1860 painting by Thomas Moran.
