= Visitation =

Visitation may refer to:

== Law ==
- Visitation (law) or contact, the right of a non-custodial parent to visit with their children
- Prison visitation rights, the rules and conditions under which prisoners may have visitors

== Music ==
- Visitation (Division Day album), 2009
- Visitation (Sam Jones album), 1978
- Visitation (Joe McPhee album), 1985
- Visitation (Jonah Sharp and Bill Laswell album), 1994
- "Visitation", an instrumental by Paul Chambers from Chambers' Music, 1956

== Religion ==
- Visitation (Christianity), a liturgical feast day commemorating the visit of the Virgin Mary to St. Elizabeth
- Visitation Order of enclosed nuns
  - Visitation Convent
  - Visitation Monastery
- Visitation Church, Montreal
- Canonical visitation, an inspection made by a clergyman authorised under Catholic canon law
- Visitation, a funeral custom where a mourner visits the deceased's family and views the body

== Visual arts ==
Images of the Visitation (Christianity), the visit of the Virgin Mary to St. Elizabeth

- Visitation (Albertinelli), 1503
- Visitation (Cariani), c.1524-1528
- Visitation (Dürer), a 1503 engraving by Albrecht Dürer
- Visitation (Ghirlandaio), a 1491 painting by Domenico Ghirlandaio displayed in the Louvre
- Visitation (El Greco), a 1608–1613 painting by El Greco
- Visitation (Perugino), c.1472
- Visitation (Raphael), a c. 1517 painting by Raphael
- Visitation (Rubens), 1610s
- Visitation (Tintoretto, Bologna), c.1550
- Visitation (Tintoretto, Venice), c.1588
- Visitation (van der Weyden), c.1445

== Other uses ==
- Visitation, an upcoming Irish horror film
- "Visitation" (Stargate Universe), an episode of Stargate Universe
- Heraldic visitation, a tour of inspection by a herald (or other officer-of-arms) to regulate and register coats of arms, and to record pedigrees; also, the written record of such a tour

== See also ==
- The Visitation (disambiguation)
- Visit (disambiguation)
