= The Visit =

The Visit may refer to:

== Film and television ==
- La visita (The Visit), a 1963 Italian film, directed by Antonio Pietrangeli
- The Visit (1964 film), an adaptation of the Friedrich Dürrenmatt play, directed by Bernhard Wicki
- The Visit (1970 film), directed by Kais al-Zubaidi
- The Visit (2000 film), directed by Jordan Walker-Pearlman
- The Visit (2015 American film), directed by M. Night Shyamalan
- The Visit (2015 Nigerian film), directed by Oyefunke Fayoyin
- The Visit (TV series), a 2007 BBC sitcom
- "The Visit" (Happy Hollidays), a 2009 television episode

== Literature and theatre ==
- The Visit (play), a 1956 play by Friedrich Dürrenmatt
- The Visit (poetry collection), a 1970 collection by Ian Hamilton
- The Visit (musical), a 2001 Kander and Ebb musical adaptation of the Dürrenmatt play

== Music ==
- The Visit (Pat Martino album), a 1972 album by Pat Martino, and its title track
- The Visit (EP), a 1980 EP by Ludus
- The Visit (Loreena McKennitt album), 1991
- "The Visit" (song), a 1993 song by George Jones, also released by Chad Brock in 2000

== See also ==
- Visit (disambiguation)
