= Self-Portrait (Salvator Rosa) =

Painting by Salvator Rosa

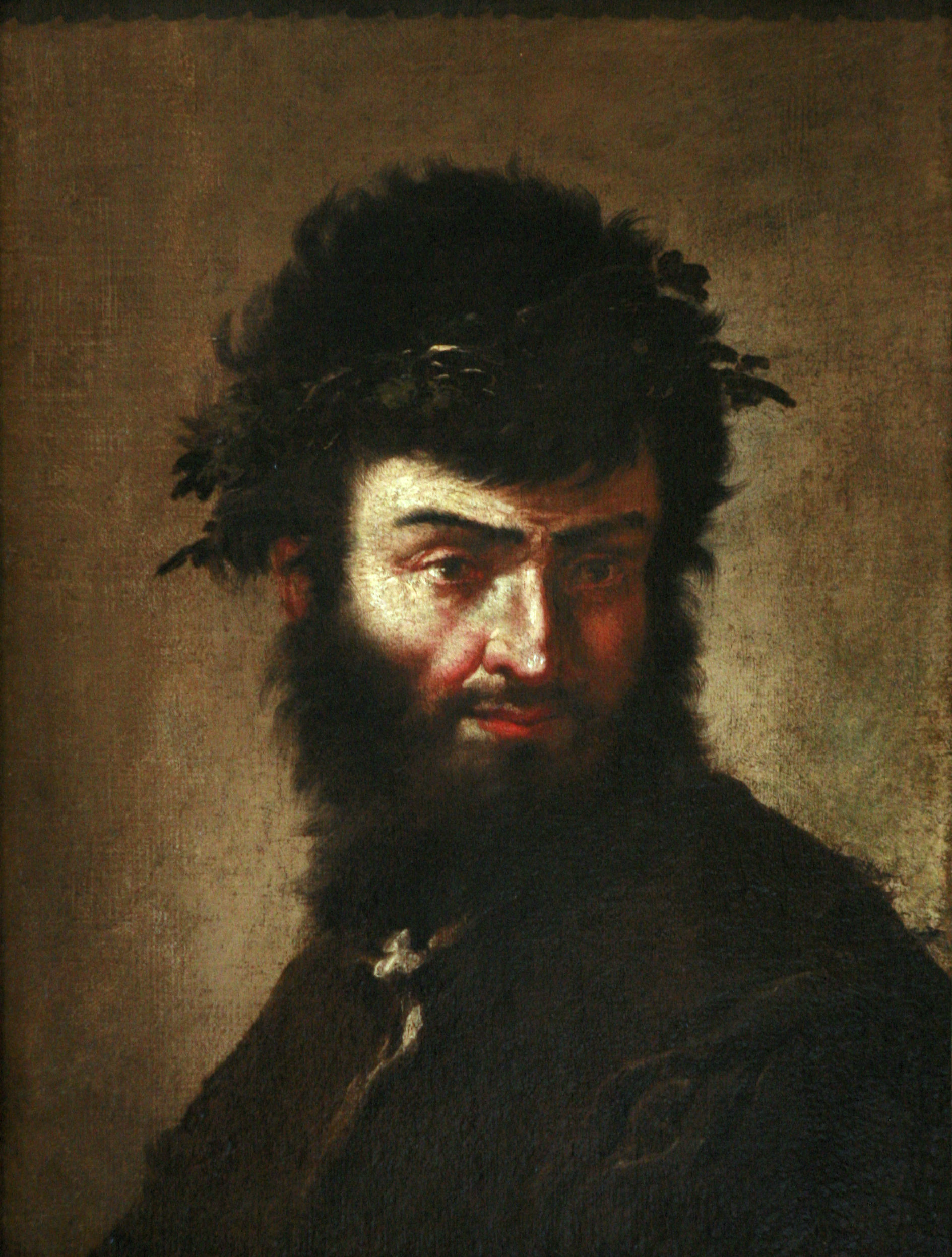
- Artist: Salvator Rosa
- Year: between 1640 and 1649
- Medium: oil painting on canvas
- Movement: Baroque painting
- Subject: Self-portrait
- Dimensions: 61 cm × 45 cm (24 in × 18 in)
- Location: Musée des Beaux-Arts, Strasbourg
- Accession: 1987

Self-Portrait is an undated work by the Southern Italian artist from Naples, Salvator Rosa. It was most probably painted during Rosa's stay in Florence between 1640 and 1649, although a claim has been made that it was painted in the early 1660s. The self-portrait belongs to the Musée des Beaux-Arts of Strasbourg, France, to which it was presented in 1987 by the collectors Othon Kaufmann and François Schlageter, together with other Italian Baroque paintings such as Bononi's Saint Sebastian and the Angel. Its inventory number is 44.987.3.7.

The painting depicts Rosa not as a painter, but as a poet laureate. It had belonged to the collection of nobleman Filippo Niccolini of the Florentine Niccolini Family and was later purchased by Kaufmann and Schlageter through the Venetian art dealer Ettore Viancini.

== See also ==
- Philosophy by Salvator Rosa
