= Visit =

Visit refers to seeing and spending time with an individual, entity, or place, usually socially.

Visit may refer to:

- State visit, a formal visit by a head of state to a foreign country
- Conjugal visit, in which a prisoner is permitted to spend several hours or days in private with a visitor, usually a spouse
- US-VISIT, a U.S. immigration and border management system
- Constable Visit, a fictional character from the Discworld novels by Terry Pratchett
- VisIt, interactive parallel visualization and analysis software
- Visit (internet), measures an individual's first request for a page on a firm’s server

== See also ==
- The Visit (disambiguation)
- Visitation (disambiguation)
