= Kais al-Zubaidi =

Iraqi film director (1939–2024)

- Born: 1939; Baghdad, Iraq
- Died: 1 December 2024 (aged 85)
- Education: Diploma in Montage (1964) and in Photography (1969)
- Occupations: Director, writer, screenwriter
- Writing career
- Language: Arabic
- Notable works: Al-yazerli (1974), The Adventure (1974) and Al-lail (1992)

Kais al-Zubaidi (Arabic: قيس الزبيدي; 1939 – 1 December 2024), also spelled Qais Al-Zubaidi or Kays Al Zbaide, was an Iraqi-born director, writer and researcher in film theory and montage. In the 1960s, he studied both montage and photography at the Higher Institute of Cinema in Germany. Then he proceeded to work as a director, cameraman, and scenario writer. He directed a number of documentary and narrative films about Palestine, some of which won Arab and international awards. He was best known for his films The Visit (1970), Al-yazerli, The Adventure (both 1974), and Al-lail (1992).

== Life and career ==
Al-Zubaidi graduated from the Higher Institute of Cinema in Germany with a diploma in Montage (1964) and in Photography (1969). Then he proceeded to work at the DIVA Studio for Documentary Films and at the Higher Institute of Cinema in Germany in montage, photography and directing.

Al-Zubaidi has organized several cinematic courses in scenario, directing, and editing in Tunis and at the Radio and TV Training Center, Union of Arab Broadcasters in Damascus, Al-Manar TV Training Center in Beirut, Goethe Institute in Damascus, and The Royal Jordanian Commission in Amman. He also founded the "Palestinian National Film Archive" in cooperation with the Federal Archives in Berlin, Germany.

Al-Zubaidi directed a set of documentaries at the General Cinema Foundation in Damascus and in the Department of Culture and Information in Lebanon and in Germany. Some of his films have actually won Arab and international awards. He also directed some experimental films, including "The Visit" in 1970 and "Al-Yazerli" in 1974, which suffered censorship wherever it was screened. In 1995, critic Mohsen Wafi published a book titled "A Lover from Palestine" about al-Zubaidi and his films. Further, in 2019, Syrian director Muhammad Malas published a biography titled "Qais Al-Zubaidi Life as Scraps on the Wall".

Al-Zubaidi died on 1 December 2024, at the age of 85.

== Works ==
=== Films ===
- Far from the Homeland, 1969
- Men Under the Sun, 1970
- The Visit, 1970
- The Knife, 1972
- The Mexican Hoax, 1972
- Testimonies of Palestinian Children in Wartime, 1972
- Love's Other Face, 1973
- The Adventure, 1974
- Al Yazerli, 1974
- Al-lail, 1992

=== Books ===
- The Structure of a TV Drama Series: Towards a New Dramatic, Qudamus Publishing House, 2001
- The Dramatic of Change: Bertolt Brecht, Canaan House, 2004
- The Visual and Audible in Cinema, Damascus: The General Film Organization, 2006
- Palestine in Cinema, Institute for Palestine Studies, 2006
- The Literary Medium in Cinema, Abu Dhabi: Festival: Films from the Emirates, 2007
- Monographs in Film’s Image, Theory, and History, Damascus: The General Film Organization, 2010
- In Film Culture – Monographies, Cairo: The General Authority for Cultural Palaces, 2013
- Documentary Film: Reality Without Banks, Palestinian Ministry of Culture, 2017
- Studies in the Structure of the Film Medium, Sharjah: Department of Culture, 2018

== See also ==
- Abbas Khadir
