= Ian Hamilton (critic) =

English writer and editor (1938–2001)

- The cover of Hamilton's Collected Poems
- Born: Robert Ian Hamilton; 24 March 1938; King's Lynn, Norfolk, England
- Died: 27 December 2001 (aged 63); London, England
- Education: Darlington Grammar School; Keble College, Oxford
- Occupations: Writer; literary critic; editor; publisher
- Spouses: Gisela Dietzel; Ahdaf Soueif
- Partner: Patricia Wheatley
- Children: 5
- Website: ianhamilton.org

Robert Ian Hamilton (24 March 1938 – 27 December 2001) was a British literary critic, reviewer, biographer, poet, magazine editor and publisher.

== Early life and education ==
He was born in King's Lynn, Norfolk, England. His parents were Scottish and had moved to Norfolk in 1936. The family moved to Darlington in 1951. Hamilton's civil engineer father died a few months later.

A keen soccer player, Hamilton was diagnosed with a heart complaint at the age of 15. Unable to play games, he developed his interest in poetry. At the age of 17, in sixth form at Darlington Grammar School, Hamilton produced two issues of his own magazine, which was called The Scorpion. For the second issue, he sent a questionnaire to various literary figures in London asking if there was any advice they could give young authors. Around 50 or so replies were received from figures such as Louis Golding.

After leaving school, Hamilton did his National Service in Mönchengladbach, Germany. He then attended Keble College, Oxford, and within a year started a magazine Tomorrow. The first issues were patchy, but the magazine grew in confidence, publishing an early play by Harold Pinter in its fourth and final issue.

== Career ==
In 1962, Hamilton started The Review magazine, with Michael Fried, John Fuller and Colin Falck. The Review became the most influential postwar British poetry magazine, publishing a wide variety of writers and both short and long pieces. It ran until its 10th-anniversary issue in 1972.

In 1964 The Review published a pamphlet of Hamilton's poems entitled Pretending Not to Sleep. It was one of three pamphlets that made up issue no. 13 of The Review.

In 1965, to make ends meet, Hamilton took a three-day-a-week job at The Times Literary Supplement, which soon grew to be the position of poetry and fiction editor, a post he held until 1973.

In 1970, Faber and Faber published The Visit, a slender book of Hamilton's poems. This was a somewhat reworked and expanded version of the 1964 pamphlet. The 33 poems contained in The Visit all reflect Hamilton's concise writing style. Hamilton subsequently spoke about the relationship between the stressful circumstances of his personal life – in particular the mental illness of his wife – and the brevity of the poems. "You had to keep your control however bad things were; you had to be in charge. And I suppose the perfect poem became something that had to contain the maximum amount of control – and of suffering."

In 1974, Hamilton started The New Review, a large-format glossy magazine. Its first issue was 100 pages and featured many well-known writers. Again, it was influential in literary circles, and encouraged younger writers. But the magazine depended on Arts Council funding, and when that stopped, four and half years and 50 issues later, The New Review closed. Hamilton then wrote freelance, including regularly for the New Statesman.

In 1976, another pamphlet of poems by Hamilton appeared, entitled Returning, which contained 12 new poems.

After his friend poet Robert Lowell died in 1977, Hamilton wrote a biography of him, which was well received. Encouraged by that, Hamilton began writing a biography and critique of J. D. Salinger. Famously averse to publicity, Salinger took legal action in Salinger v. Random House to prevent the book being published and was successful in denying Hamilton the right to quote from his letters or paraphrase them. Hamilton, however, was able to incorporate these frustrations into the book, entitled In Search of J.D. Salinger.

From 1984 to 1987, Hamilton presented the BBC Bookmark television programme, featuring many well-known writers.

In 1988, Faber published a new collection of his verse: Fifty Poems. This included the poems previously published in The Visit, together with 11 of the poems from Returning and six new poems. In the preface Hamilton wrote: "Fifty poems in twenty-five years: not much to show for half a lifetime, you might think. And in certain moods, I would agree." Ten years later, Faber published Sixty Poems, again matching his age, and these also incorporated earlier poems.

In 1989, he guest-edited the second number of the literary magazine Soho Square, published by Bloomsbury.

His experience with Salinger inspired Keepers of the Flame, Hamilton's 1992 book about the history of literary estates and unofficial biographers. His love of football led him to write Gazza Agonistes and Gazza Italia in 1993 and 1994, about Paul Gascoigne's seemingly wasted talent.

In 1999, Cargo Press published Another Round At The Pillars, a collection of "essays, poems and reflections on Ian Hamilton" to celebrate his 60th birthday, with contributions from a range of prominent authors and poets, including Julian Barnes, Ian McEwan, Harold Pinter and Clive James.

Hamilton's final book was Against Oblivion: Some Lives of the Twentieth-Century Poets (2002). Taking Samuel Johnson as his inspiration, he chose 45 dead 20th-century poets and assessed their achievement with his customary economy and wit. The book was published posthumously.

Hamilton died of cancer in 2001 in London, aged 63. His first wife, Gisela Dietzel, and their son Matthew Hamilton survive him, as does his second wife Ahdaf Soueif and their two sons, and his long-term partner, Patricia Wheatley, by whom he had a son and daughter, Catherine and William Hamilton.

In 2002, Between the Lines published Ian Hamilton in Conversation with Dan Jacobson, in which the novelist and academic Dan Jacobson interviewed Hamilton about his life and career.

In 2009, Faber and Faber published Hamilton's Collected Poems, with an introduction by Alan Jenkins.

A selection of Hamilton's books by other poets were donated to Keble College, Oxford, where they are accessible to students as the Ian Hamilton Poetry Library.

The critic James Wood includes an anecdote about Wood in his study The Irresponsible Self: On Laughter and the Novel (2004):

One London lunchtime, many years ago, the late poet and editor Ian Hamilton was sitting at his usual table in a Soho pub called the Pillars of Hercules. The pub was where much of the business of Hamilton's literary journal, The New Review, was conducted. It was sickeningly early—not to be at work, but to be at drink. A pale, haggard poet entered, and Hamilton offered him a chair and a glass of something. "Oh no, I just can’t keep drinking," said the weakened poet. "I must give it up. It's doing terrible things to me. It's not even giving me any pleasure any longer." But Hamilton, narrowing his eyes, responded to this feebleness in a tone of weary stoicism, and said in a quiet, hard voice, "Well, none of us likes it."

The author Andrew O'Hagan recounts a near-identical story, but with Hamilton's rebuttal delivered to a "whey-faced" newspaper writer rather than a poet.

== Bibliography ==
- Pretending Not to Sleep (1964), poetry pamphlet
- The Visit (1970), poetry book
- A Poetry Chronicle (1973), essays and reviews
- Returning (1976), poetry pamphlet
- The Little Magazines: A Study of Six Editors (1976)
- Robert Lowell: A Biography (1982)
- In Search of J.D. Salinger (1988), biography and critique
- Fifty Poems (1988), poetry collection
- Writers in Hollywood 1915–1951 (1990)
- Keepers of the Flame (1992), on literary estates
- Gazza Agonistes (1993), on Paul Gascoigne
- Gazza Italia (1994), on Paul Gascoigne
- Walking Possession (1994), essays and reviews
- Oxford Companion to 20th-Century Poetry (1994), as editor
- Steps (1997), poetry
- A Gift Imprisoned: The Poetic Life of Matthew Arnold (1998)
- Sixty Poems (1998), poetry collection
- The Trouble with Money (1998), essays
- Against Oblivion: Some Lives of the Twentieth-Century Poets (2002)
