= Colin Falck =

British literary critic and poet (1934–2020)

Colin Falck (14 July 1934 — 27 December 2020) was a British literary critic and poet. He was associate professor in modern literature at York College of Pennsylvania.

In 1962, Falck co-founded the influential postwar British poetry magazine The Review with Oxford University schoolmates Ian Hamilton, Michael Fried, and John Fuller. Falck's poetry would later appear in the first issue of Hamilton's magazine The New Review. In January 1985 he set up, and from that date acted as chair of, the Thurlow Road Poetry Workshop. Among the poets to have brought their work to the fortnightly (now monthly) meetings of the group are Hugo Williams, Jo Shapcott, Ruth Padel, Eva Salzman, Adam Thorpe, Michael Donaghy, Don Paterson, Jane Duran. Kate Clanchy, Greta Stoddart and Vicki Feaver.

His 1989 treatise Myth, Truth and Literature: Towards a True Postmodernism, attempted to re-think the entire foundation of Romantic art criticism since Kant. The first chapter is a sustained polemic against what Falck argued was the nihilism and ontological emptiness of post-modernism and post-structuralist literary theory. The next chapter offers, in opposition to Saussure, a theory of the origin of language based on onomatopoeia. One critic said:

He offers a Neo-Romantic, expressivist view influenced by Shelley. His view is not self-expressivist, however, since it denies the epistemological notion of a detached subject and situates the human being in the world in the manner of modern phenomenology...Art, for Falck, gives ontological truth.

The book makes constant reference to Kant, Coleridge, Schiller, Shelley, Blake, Keats and Goethe. Author Camille Paglia hailed the book as "reveal[ing] the future of literary criticism".

Falck criticized W. H. Auden's didactic theory of poetry: "Responsible poetry therefore becomes a kind of war-time fruit-cake, with the raisins of escape thinly distributed in a daily bread of parable".

Falck died on 27 December 2020, at the age of 86.

== Bibliography ==
- The Garden in the Evening by Antonio Machado (translator) The Review, Oxford
- Backwards Into the Smoke ISBN 978-0-85635-054-2 ISBN 0856350540
- Poems Since 1900: an Anthology of British and American Verse in the Twentieth Century Hamilton, Ian Macdonald and Jane's, UK London 1975 ISBN 978-0-356-03151-4 ISBN 0356031519
- In This Dark Light London, TNR 1978
- "A Defence of Poetry", Journal of Aesthetics and Art Criticism 44.4 (summer 1986): 398. 37.
- "Beyond Theory", Essays in Criticism 1986 XXXVI(1):1-10; doi:10.1093/eic/XXXVI.1.1 1986 Oxford University Press
- Selected Poems by Robinson Jeffers: The Centenary Edition Carcanet Press Ltd. United Kingdom 1987 ISBN 978-0-85635-708-4 ISBN 0856357081
- Edna St. Vincent Millay: Selected Poems: the Centenary Edition Harpercollins 1991 ISBN 978-0-06-016733-2 ISBN 0060167335
- Memorabilia Stride Publications (March 1992) ISBN 1-873012-22-5 ISBN 9781873012222
- Myth, Truth and Literature: Towards a True Postmodernism Cambridge University Press 1989, (revised & expanded) 1994 ISBN 978-0-521-46185-6 ISBN 9780521467513 ISBN 0-521-46751-9
- Post-Modern Love: An Unreliable Narration (1997)
- American and British Verse in the Twentieth Century: The Poetry that Matters Ashgate, December 2003 ISBN 978-0-7546-3424-9
- Leni’s Triumph Shoestring Press (December 2020) ISBN 978-1912524549
