= Visitation (Rubens) =

Painting by Peter Paul Rubens

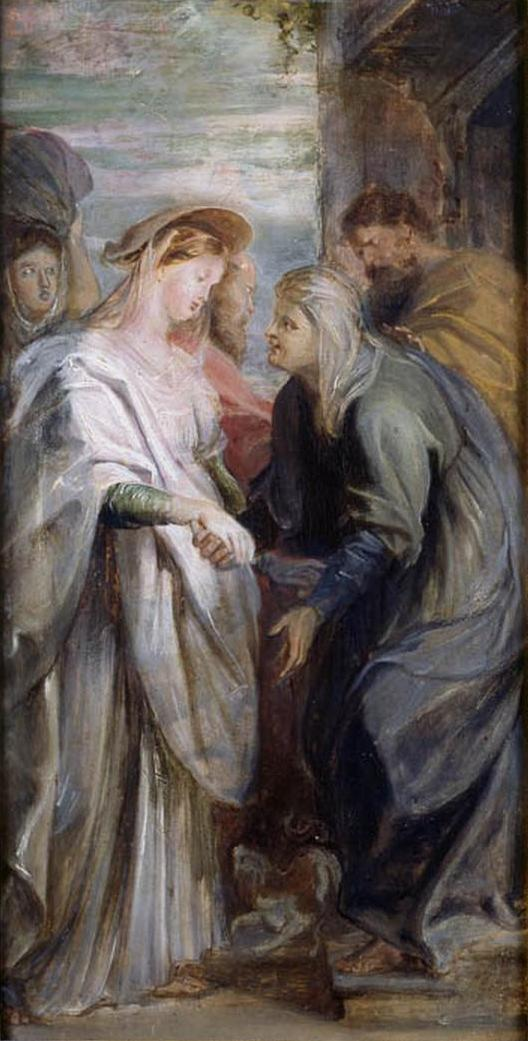
- Artist: Peter Paul Rubens
- Year: between 1611 and 1615
- Medium: Oil paint on panel
- Movement: Baroque painting Catholic art
- Subject: Visitation
- Dimensions: 50 cm × 26 cm (20 in × 10 in)
- Location: Musée des Beaux-Arts, Strasbourg
- Accession: 1890

Visitation is a 1610s oil painting by the Flemish Baroque artist Peter Paul Rubens. It is now in the Musée des Beaux-Arts of Strasbourg, France. Its inventory number is 198.

The painting was bought in London in 1890. It was first recorded as belonging to the estate of John Douglas of Gyrn Castle in 1840. Its previous history has been hypothetically reconstructed back until 1758, when it was supposedly sold with the collection of a Martin Robyns, on 22 May of that year.

Visitation is a modello, and it has long been assumed that it has been painted as a first idea for the left wing of the Antwerp cathedral triptych The Descent from the Cross, one of Rubens's most famous and influential works, and then abandoned, since the actual modello for the actual Antwerp Visitation is a version now kept in the Courtauld Institute of Art. In 2005 however, the Spanish art historian Matías Díaz Padrón, longtime director of the department of Flemish and Dutch paintings of the Museo del Prado, demonstrated that the Strasbourg modello had in fact been used for another triptych (held in a private collection) of slightly later date and much smaller dimensions than the Antwerp one. Accordingly, the generally admitted date of 1611–1612 may in fact be corrected to 1614–1615. While broadly agreeing with Díaz Padrón, his French counterpart from the Louvre, Jacques Foucart, thinks that the privately held triptych is in fact not the original from Rubens's hand, but an early and very good copy of a lost Rubens original.

As with many Rubens works of that period, the Strasbourg painting shows influences of Annibale Carracci and Paolo Veronese. A study for the painting (ink on paper, 26.5 cm (10.4 in) x 36 cm (14 in)) is kept in Bayonne's Musée Bonnat.
