= The Visitation =

The Visitation may refer to:

- The Visitation (Christianity), a Christian feast day commemorating the visit of the Blessed Virgin Mary with Saint Elizabeth as recorded in the Gospel of Luke 1:39–56
- The Visitation (Doctor Who), a 1982 serial in the British science fiction television series Doctor Who
- The Visitation (novel), a 1999 novel by Frank Peretti
  - The Visitation (film), a 2006 film based on the Peretti novel
- The Visitation (Chrome album) (1976)
- The Visitation (Magnum album) (2011)
- The Visitation (MS), a Hungarian painting by "Master MS"

== See also ==
- Visitation (disambiguation)
