= The Visit (1970 film) =

Short film by Kais al-Zubaidi

- Title card
- Arabic: الزيارة
- Directed by: Kais al-Zubaidi
- Starring: Muna Wassef; Youssef Hanna; Yassin Arnaout; Hassan Baghdadi; Marwan Arnaout
- Production company: General Cinema Organisation (GCO)
- Release date: 1970
- Running time: 9 minutes
- Country: Syria
- Language: Arabic

The Visit (Arabic: الزيارة, Al-Ziyarah) is a 1970 Syrian experimental short film directed by Iraqi-born filmmaker Kais al-Zubaidi. Described by al-Zubaidi as a "film-poem", The Visit is a collage film composed of photographs and drawings; poetry by Palestinian poets Mahmoud Darwish, Samih al-Qasim and Tawfiq Ziad; and two acted scenes.

== Cast ==
- Muna Wassef
- Youssef Hanna
- Yassin Arnaout
- Hassan Baghdadi
- Marwan Arnaout

== Themes and interpretations ==
In 2018, author Nadia Yaqub analyzed the film's use of juxtaposition, writing that its incorporation of "verses from poets residing within Israel, the documentary images of violence from the 1967 Israeli occupation of Arab lands, and the acted scenes in indeterminate locations suggest the shared political context in which disparate Palestinians (and perhaps other Arabs) face oppression." Yaqub adds that the film's juxtaposition of photographs and acted scenes suggest "the dichotomy between documentary (in which violence is explicit and graphic) and imaginative (in which violence is mediated through metaphors) images," and utilizes imagery of a face staring directly into the camera as a means to "[implicate] viewers in the circuits already connected by documentary and staged images".

In 2020, a reviewer for Sight and Sound magazine characterized The Visit as subverting Western expectations towards Middle Eastern film: "An oneiric and nocturnal abstraction, The Visit confutes the prejudice that frames Middle Eastern cinema under the restrictive lenses of realism. Western audiences tend to consider formal experimentation an exclusive characteristic of their own aesthetic tradition. The assumption underlines a deep preconception that sees non-Western cultures unable to reflect upon themselves or deconstruct their own formal conventions, prisoners of their own culture, whereas the very same term, 'culture', stands for creativity and critical production in a Western context."

== Release ==
The Visit was rejected by the Dok Leipzig film festival in Germany in 1970, whose selection committee reportedly deemed it too experimental.

In 2014, The Visit was screened as part of an exhibition titled "The World Is with Us: Global Film and Poster Art from the Palestinian Revolution, 1968–1980", held in London, England, from 16 May to 14 June 2014.
