= Baroque painting =

European art movement from about 1590 to 1750

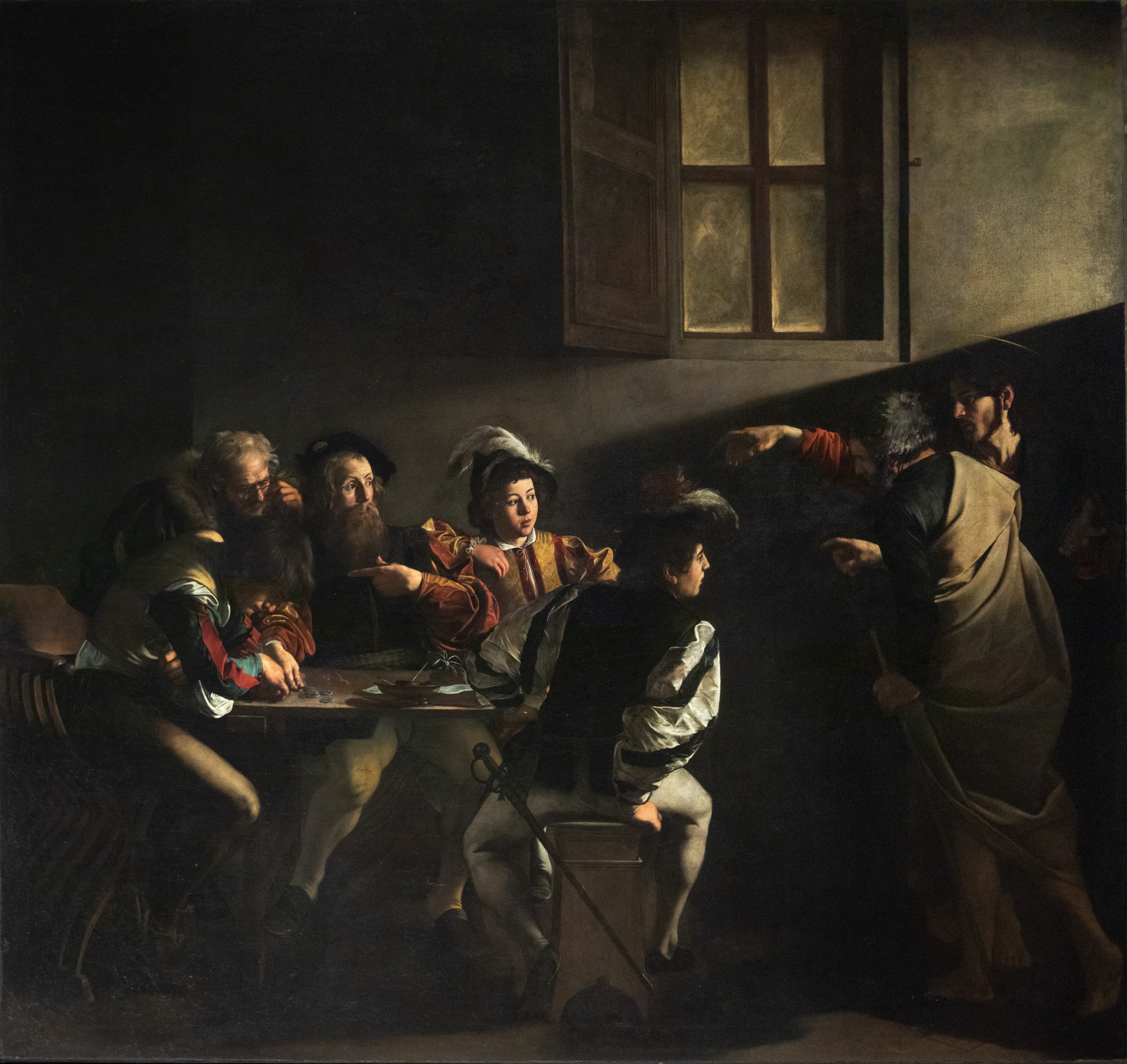
The Calling of Saint Matthew (1599–1600), by Caravaggio. Contarelli Chapel, San Luigi dei Francesi, Rome. The beam of light, which enters the picture from the direction of a real window, expresses in the blink of an eye the conversion of St Matthew, the hinge on which his destiny will turn, with no flying angels, parting clouds or other artifacts.

Rembrandt van Rijn, The Night Watch or The Militia Company of Captain Frans Banning Cocq, 1642, oil on canvas, 363 cm × 437 cm (143 in × 172 in), Rijksmuseum, Amsterdam. The painting is a classic example of Baroque art.

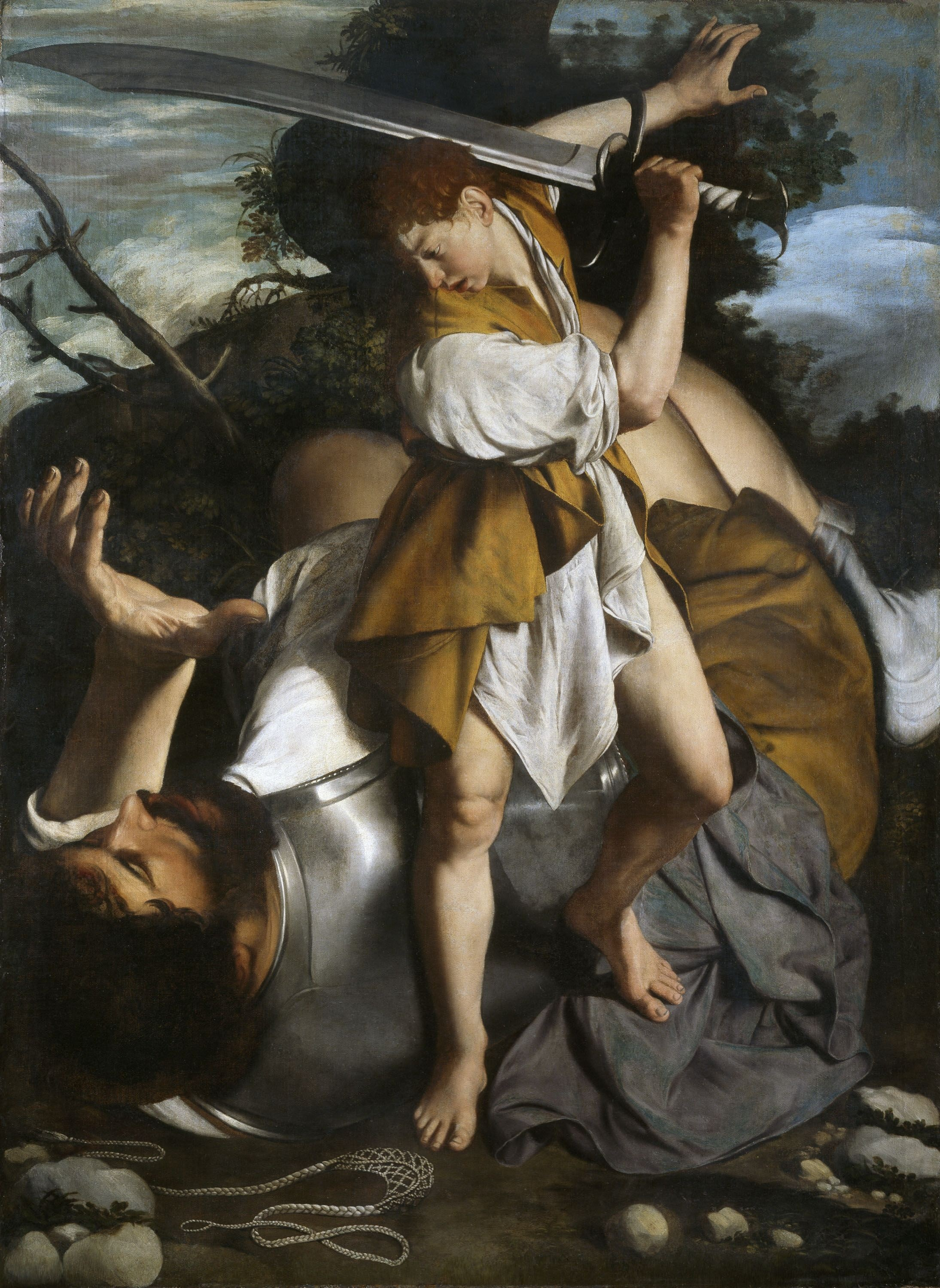
Orazio Gentileschi, David and Goliath (c. 1605–1607)

Baroque painting is the painting associated with the Baroque cultural movement. The movement is often identified with Absolutism, the Counter Reformation and Catholic Revival, but the existence of important Baroque art and architecture in non-absolutist and Protestant states throughout Western Europe underscores its widespread popularity.

Baroque painting encompasses a great range of styles, as most important and major painting during the period beginning around 1600 and continuing throughout the 17th century, and into the early 18th century is identified today as Baroque painting. In its most typical manifestations, Baroque art is characterized by great drama, rich, deep colour, and intense light and dark shadows, but the classicism of French Baroque painters like Poussin and Dutch genre painters such as Vermeer are also covered by the term, at least in English. As opposed to Renaissance art, which usually showed the moment before an event took place, Baroque artists chose the most dramatic point, the moment when the action was occurring: Michelangelo, working in the High Renaissance, shows his David composed and still before he battles Goliath; Bernini's Baroque David is caught in the act of hurling the stone at the giant. Baroque art was meant to evoke emotion and passion instead of the calm rationality that had been prized during the Renaissance.

Among the greatest painters of the Baroque period are Velázquez, Caravaggio, Rembrandt, Rubens, Poussin, and Vermeer. Caravaggio is an heir of the humanist painting of the High Renaissance. His realistic approach to the human figure, painted directly from life and dramatically spotlit against a dark background, shocked his contemporaries and opened a new chapter in the history of painting. Baroque painting often dramatizes scenes using chiaroscuro light effects; this can be seen in works by Rembrandt, Vermeer, Le Nain and La Tour. The Flemish painter Anthony van Dyck developed a graceful but imposing portrait style that was very influential, especially in England.

The prosperity of 17th century Holland led to an enormous production of art by large numbers of painters who were mostly highly specialized and painted only genre scenes, landscapes, still lifes, portraits or history paintings. Technical standards were very high, and Dutch Golden Age painting established a new repertoire of subjects that was very influential until the arrival of Modernism.

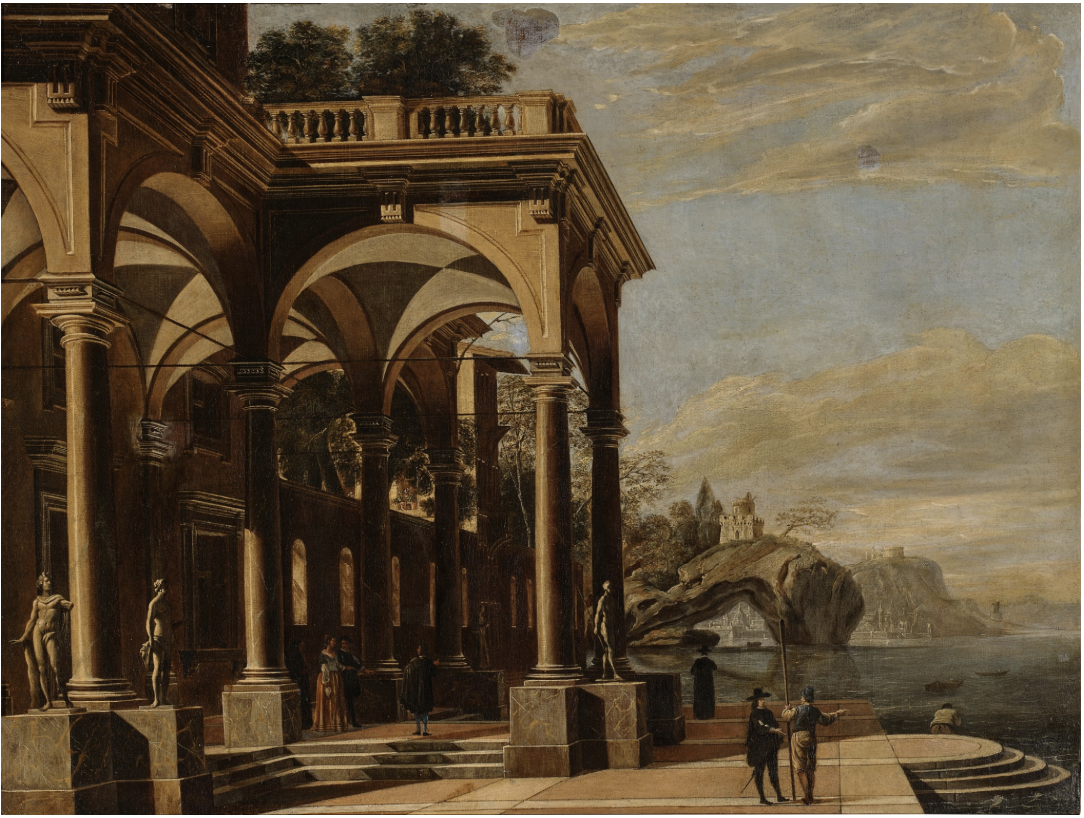
An architectural capriccio with figures by a colonnaded portico, a castle on a sea arch and coastal village beyond by Viviano Codazzi

== History ==
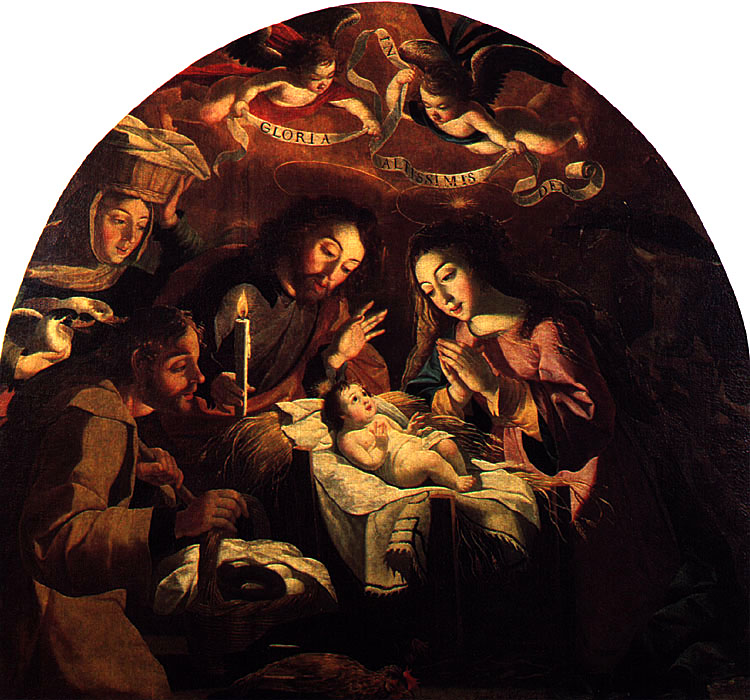
Nativity by Josefa de Óbidos, 1669, National Museum of Ancient Art, Lisbon

The Council of Trent (1545–1563), in which the Roman Catholic Church answered many questions of internal reform raised by both Protestants and by those who had remained inside the Catholic Church, addressed the representational arts in a short and somewhat oblique passage in its decrees. This was subsequently interpreted and expounded by a number of clerical authors like Molanus, who demanded that paintings and sculptures in church contexts should depict their subjects clearly and powerfully, and with decorum, without the stylistic airs of Mannerism. This return toward a populist conception of the function of ecclesiastical art is seen by many art historians as driving the innovations of Caravaggio and the Carracci brothers, all of whom were working (and competing for commissions) in Rome around 1600, although unlike the Carracci, Caravaggio persistently was criticised for lack of decorum in his work. However, although religious painting, history painting, allegories, and portraits were still considered the most noble subjects, landscape, still life, and genre scenes were also becoming more common in Catholic countries, and were the main genres in Protestant ones.

=== The term ===
The term "Baroque" was initially used with a derogatory meaning, to underline the excesses of its emphasis. Others derive it from the mnemonic term "Baroco" denoting, in logical Scholastica, a supposedly laboured form of syllogism. In particular, the term was used to describe its eccentric redundancy and noisy abundance of details, which sharply contrasted the clear and sober rationality of the Renaissance. It was first rehabilitated by the Swiss-born art historian, Heinrich Wölfflin (1864–1945) in his Renaissance und Barock (1888); Wölfflin identified the Baroque as "movement imported into mass", an art antithetic to Renaissance art. He did not make the distinctions between Mannerism and Baroque that modern writers do, and he ignored the later phase, the academic Baroque that lasted into the 18th century. Writers in French and English did not begin to treat Baroque as a respectable study until Wölfflin's influence had made German scholarship pre-eminent.

== National variations ==
Led by Italian Baroque painting, Mediterranean countries, slowly followed by most of the Holy Roman Empire in Germany and Central Europe, generally adopted a full-blooded Baroque approach.

A rather different art developed out of northern realist traditions in 17th century Dutch Golden Age painting, which had very little religious art, and little history painting, instead playing a crucial part in developing secular genres such as still life, genre paintings of everyday scenes, and landscape painting. While the Baroque nature of Rembrandt's art is clear, the label is less used for Vermeer and many other Dutch artists. Most Dutch art lacks the idealization and love of splendour typical of much Baroque work, including the neighbouring Flemish Baroque painting which shared a part in Dutch trends, while also continuing to produce the traditional categories in a more clearly Baroque style.

In France, classicism gave a distinctive flavour to Baroque painting, and the later 17th century is regarded as a golden age for painting. Two of the most important artists, Nicolas Poussin and Claude Lorrain, remained based in Rome, where their work, almost all in easel paintings, was much appreciated by Italian as well as French patrons.

== Baroque painters ==
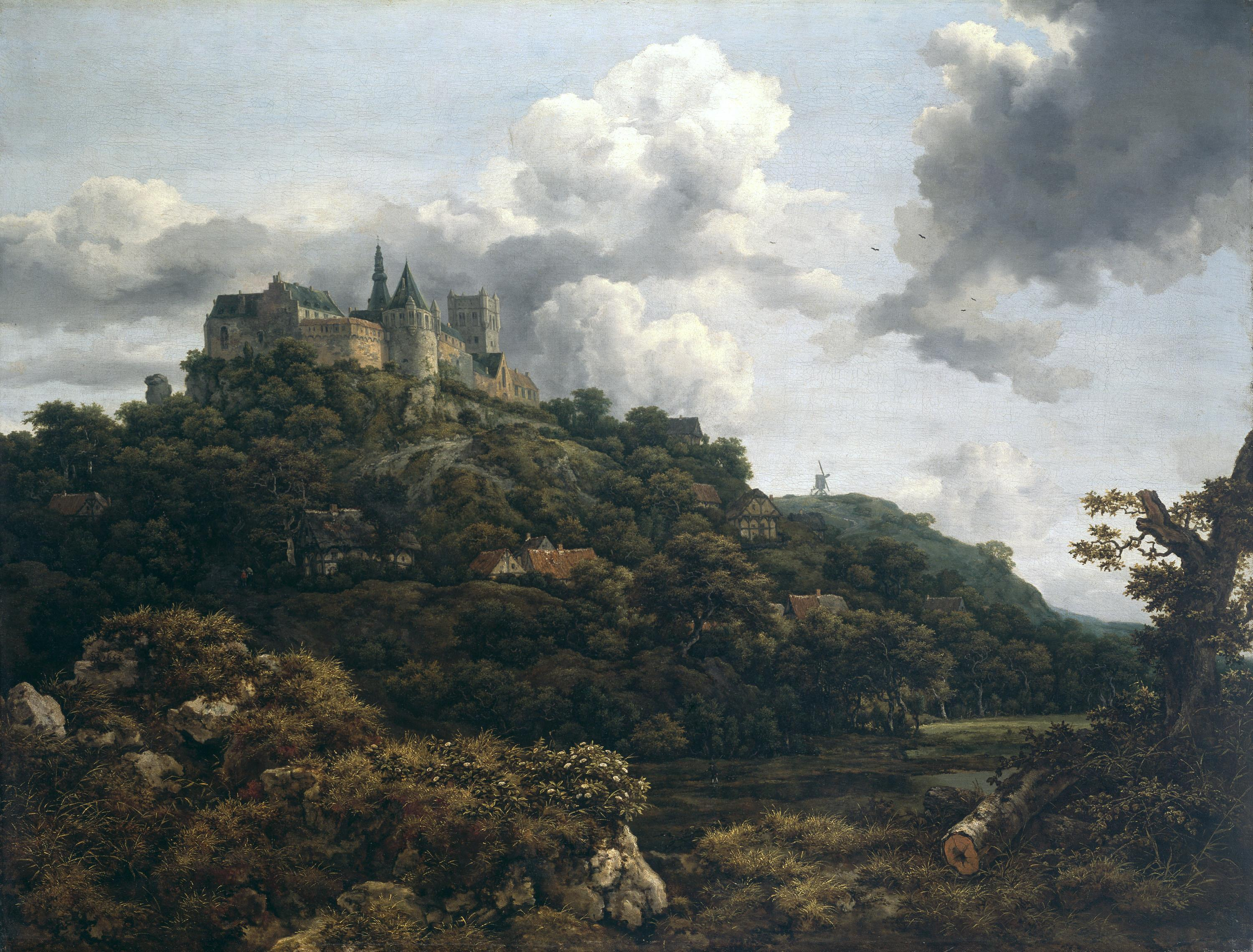
Jacob Isaakszoon van Ruisdael, Bentheim Castle (1653).

Jan Brueghel the Elder, The Entry of the Animals Into Noah's Ark, 1613.

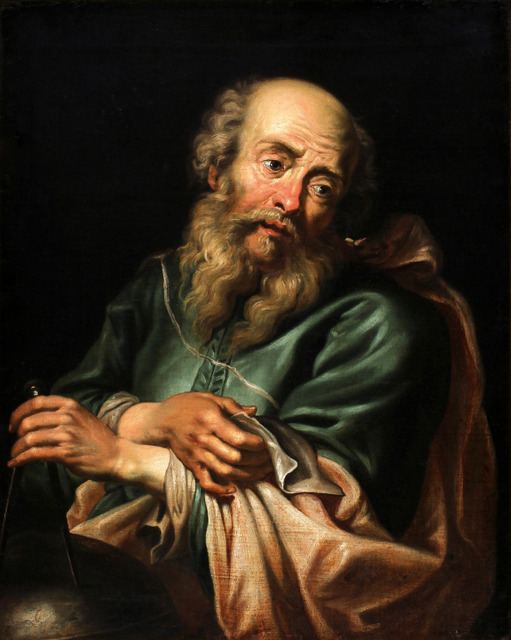
Peter Paul Rubens, Galileo Galilei, c. 1630

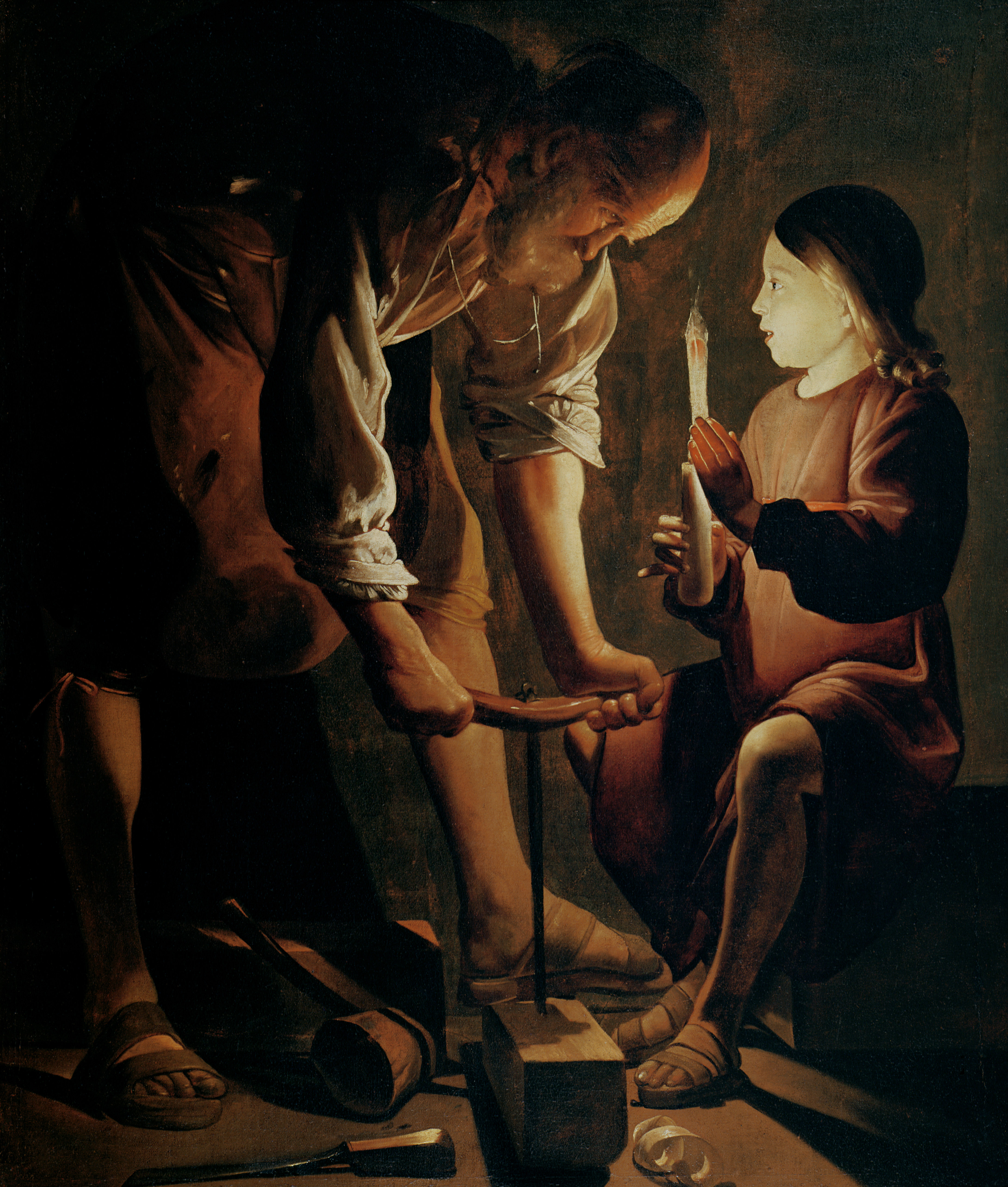
Georges de La Tour, Joseph the Carpenter, 1642, Louvre

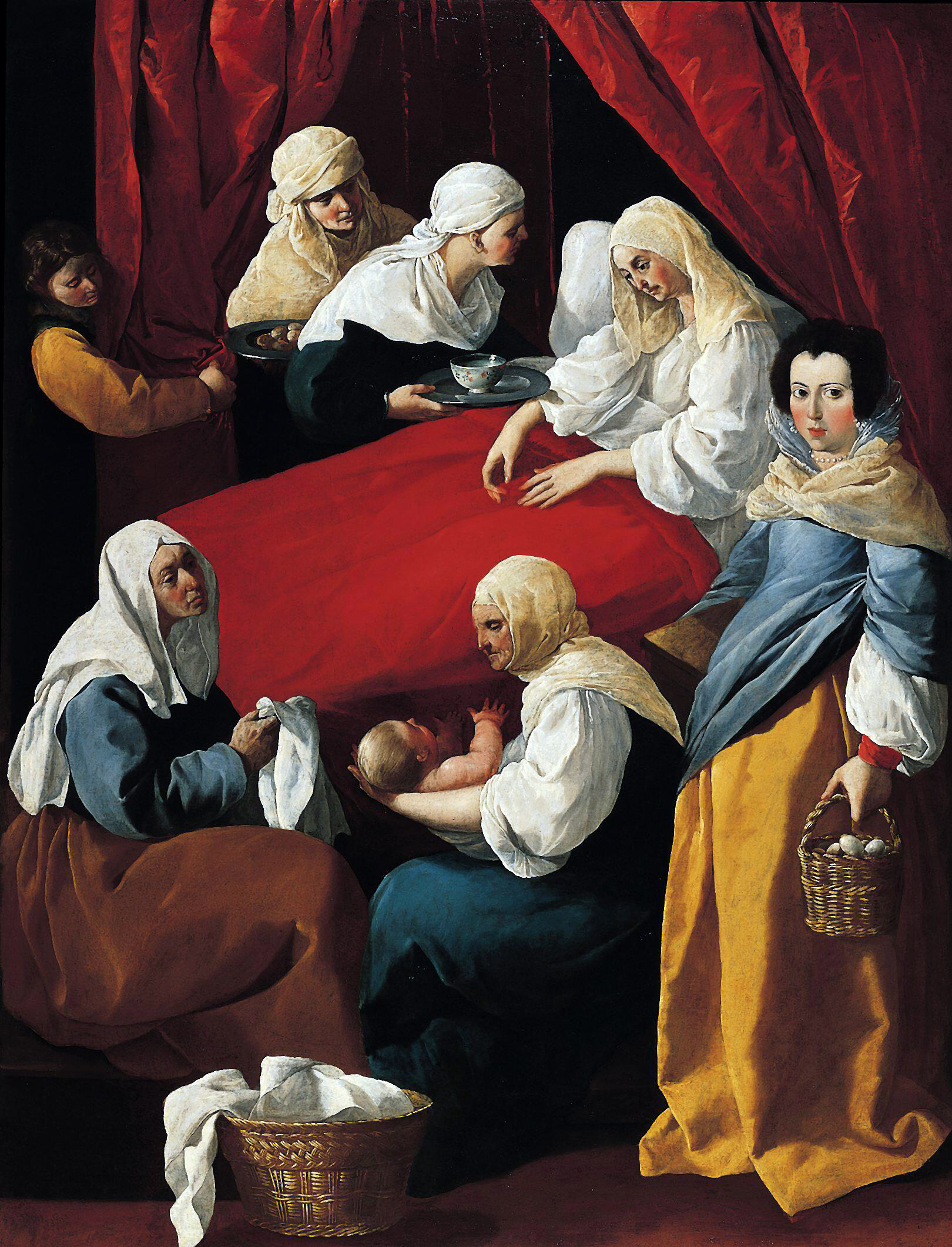
Francisco de Zurbarán, The Birth of the Virgin, c. 1625–1630

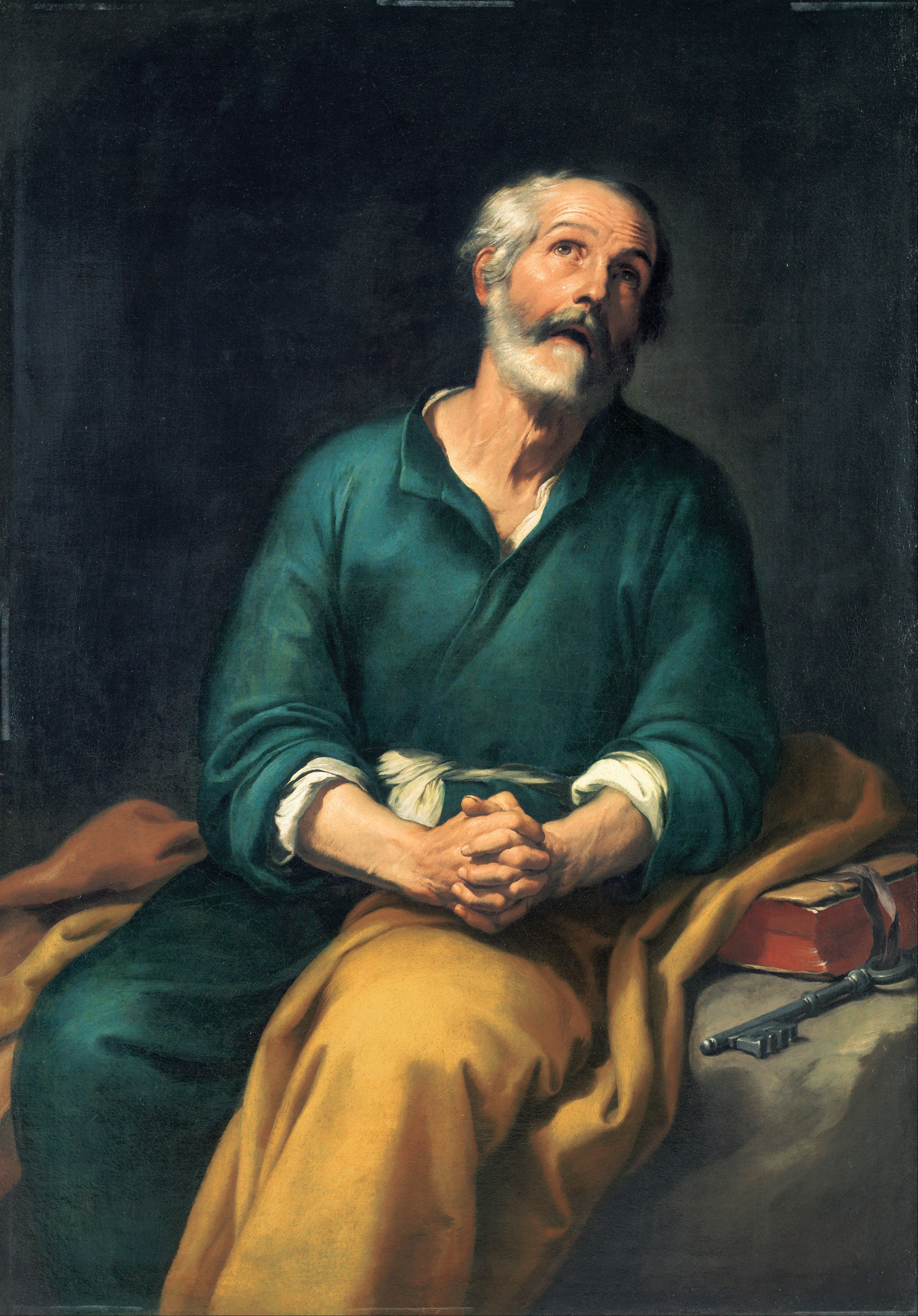
Bartolomé Esteban Murillo, Saint Peter in Tears, 1650–1655

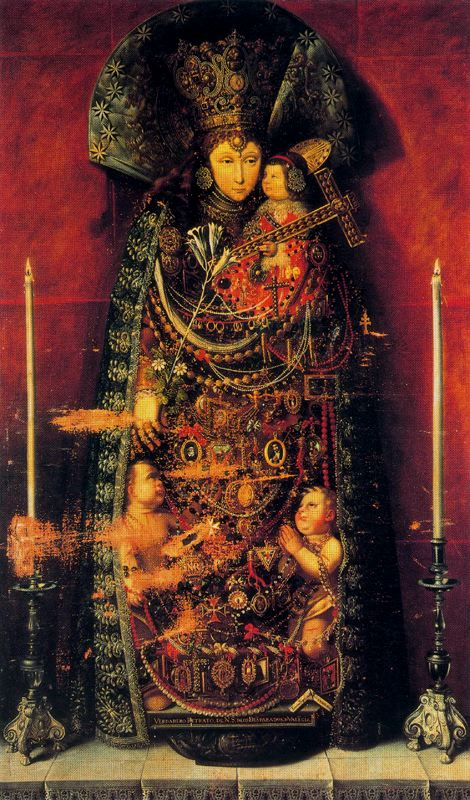
Tomás Yepes, Virgen de los desamparados (1644), a trompe-l'œil in horror vacui Baroque style

=== British ===
- William Dobson (1611–1646)
- George Jamesone (1587–1644)
- Godfrey Kneller (1646–1723)
- Peter Lely (1618–1680)
- Daniël Mijtens (1590–1648)
- John Michael Wright (1617–1694)

=== Dutch ===
- Rembrandt (1606–1669)
- Hendrick Avercamp (1585–1634)
- Gerard ter Borch (1617–1681)
- Adriaen Brouwer (1605–1638)
- Hendrick ter Brugghen (1588-1629)
- Aelbert Cuyp (1620–1691)
- Gerrit Dou (1613–1675)
- Jan van Goyen (1596–1656)
- Frans Hals (1580–1666)
- Meindert Hobbema (1638–1709)
- Gerard van Honthorst (1592–1656)
- Pieter de Hooch (1629–1684)
- Willem Kalf (1619–1693)
- Pieter van Laer (1599–1642)
- Judith Leyster (1609–1660)
- Gabriël Metsu (1629–1667)
- Adriaen van Ostade (1610–1685)
- Jacob van Ruisdael (1628–1682)
- Salomon van Ruysdael (1602–1670)
- Pieter Jansz. Saenredam (1597–1665)
- Johannes Vermeer (1632–1675)
- Jan Steen (1626–1679)

=== Czech (Bohemian) ===
- Václav Hollar (1607–1677)
- Karel Škréta (1610–1674)
- Petr Brandl (1668–1735)
- Václav Vavřinec Reiner (1686–1743)

=== Flemish ===
- Peter Paul Rubens (1577–1640)
- Anthony van Dyck (1599–1641)
- Jacob Jordaens (1593–1678)
- Jan Brueghel the Elder (1568–1625)
- Frans Francken the Younger (1581–1642)
- Clara Peeters (1594–1657)
- Gerard Seghers (1591–1651)
- Frans Snyders (1579–1657)
- David Teniers the Younger (1610–1691)
- Adriaen van Utrecht (1599–1652)
- Cornelis de Vos (1584–1651)

=== French ===
- Valentin de Boulogne (1591–1632)
- Philippe de Champaigne (1602–1674)
- Laurent de La Hyre (1606–1656)
- Georges de La Tour (1593–1652)
- Charles Le Brun (1619–1690)
- Le Nain brothers :
  - Antoine Le Nain (c. 1599–1648)
  - Louis Le Nain (c. 1593–1648)
  - Mathieu Le Nain (1607–1677)
- Eustache Le Sueur (1617–1655)
- Claude Lorrain (1600–1682)
- Pierre Mignard (1612–1695)
- Hyacinthe Rigaud (1659–1743)
- Nicolas Poussin (1594–1665)
- Simon Vouet (1590–1649)
- Antoine Watteau (1684–1721)

=== German ===
- Cosmas Damian Asam (1686–1739)
- Wolfgang Heimbach (1605–1678)
- Adam Elsheimer (1578–1610)
- Johann Liss (1590–1627)
- Sebastian Stoskopff (1597–1657)

=== Hungarian ===
- Ádám Mányoki (1673–1757)

=== Italian ===
- Federico Barocci (1535–1612)
- Jacopo Chimenti (1554–1640)
- Giovanni Battista Paggi (1554–1627)
- Antonio Tempesta (1555–1630)
- Bartolomeo Cesi (1556–1629)
- Alessandro Maganza (1556–1640)
- Bernardo Castello (1557–1629)
- Lodovico Cigoli (1559–1613)
- Enea Talpino (1559–1626)
- Bartolommeo Carducci (1560–1610)
- Caravaggio (1571–1610)
- Guercino (1591–1666)
- Annibale Carracci (1560–1609)
- Guido Reni (1575–1642)
- Viviano Codazzi (1604-1670)
- Giuseppe Passeri (1654-1714)
- Orazio Gentileschi (1563–1639)
- Artemisia Gentileschi (1592– c. 1656)
- Domenichino (1581–1641)
- Agostino Carracci (1557–1602)
- Ludovico Carracci (1555–1619)
- Bernardo Strozzi (1581-1644)
- Pietro da Cortona (1596–1669)
- Giovanna Garzoni (1600-1670)
- Virginia Vezzi (1601-1638)
- Gregorio Preti (1603–1672)
- Francesco Cozza (1605–1682)
- Mattia Preti (1613–1699)
- Salvator Rosa (1615–1673)
- Luca Giordano (1634-1705)
- Elisabetta Sirani (1638-1665)
- Andrea Pozzo (1642–1709)

=== Polish ===
- pl:Jan Reisner (1655–1713)
- Jerzy Siemiginowski-Eleuter (1660–1711)
- Szymon Czechowicz (1689–1775)
- Bartlomiej Strobel (1591–1650)
- Krzysztof Boguszewski (1635)

=== Portuguese ===
- Josefa de Óbidos (1630–1684)

=== Russian ===
- Andrey Matveyev (painter)(1701–1739)
- Aleksey Antropov (1716-1795)
- Ivan Argunov (1729-1802)
- Ivan Nikitin (painter) (1690-1741)
- ru:Roman Nikitin (1691-1753)

=== Serbian ===
- Teodor Ilić Češljar (1746–1793)
- Jakov Orfelin (early 18th century-1803)

=== Spanish ===
- José Antolínez (1635–1675)
- Alonso Cano (1601–1667)
- Juan Carreño de Miranda (1614–1685)
- Claudio Coello (1642–1693)
- Juan van der Hamen (1596–1631)
- Juan Bautista Maíno (1569–1649)
- Juan Bautista Martínez del Mazo (1612–1667)
- Bartolomé Esteban Murillo (1617–1682)
- Antonio de Pereda (1611–1678)
- Lorenzo Quiros (1717 – 1789)
- Francisco Pacheco (1564–1644)
- Francisco Ribalta (1565–1628)
- José de Ribera, Lo Spagnoletto (1591–1652)
- Juan de Valdés Leal (1622–1690)
- Diego Velázquez (1599–1660)
- Tomás Yepes (1595 or 1600 – 1674)
- Francisco Zurbarán (1598–1664)

== Gallery ==
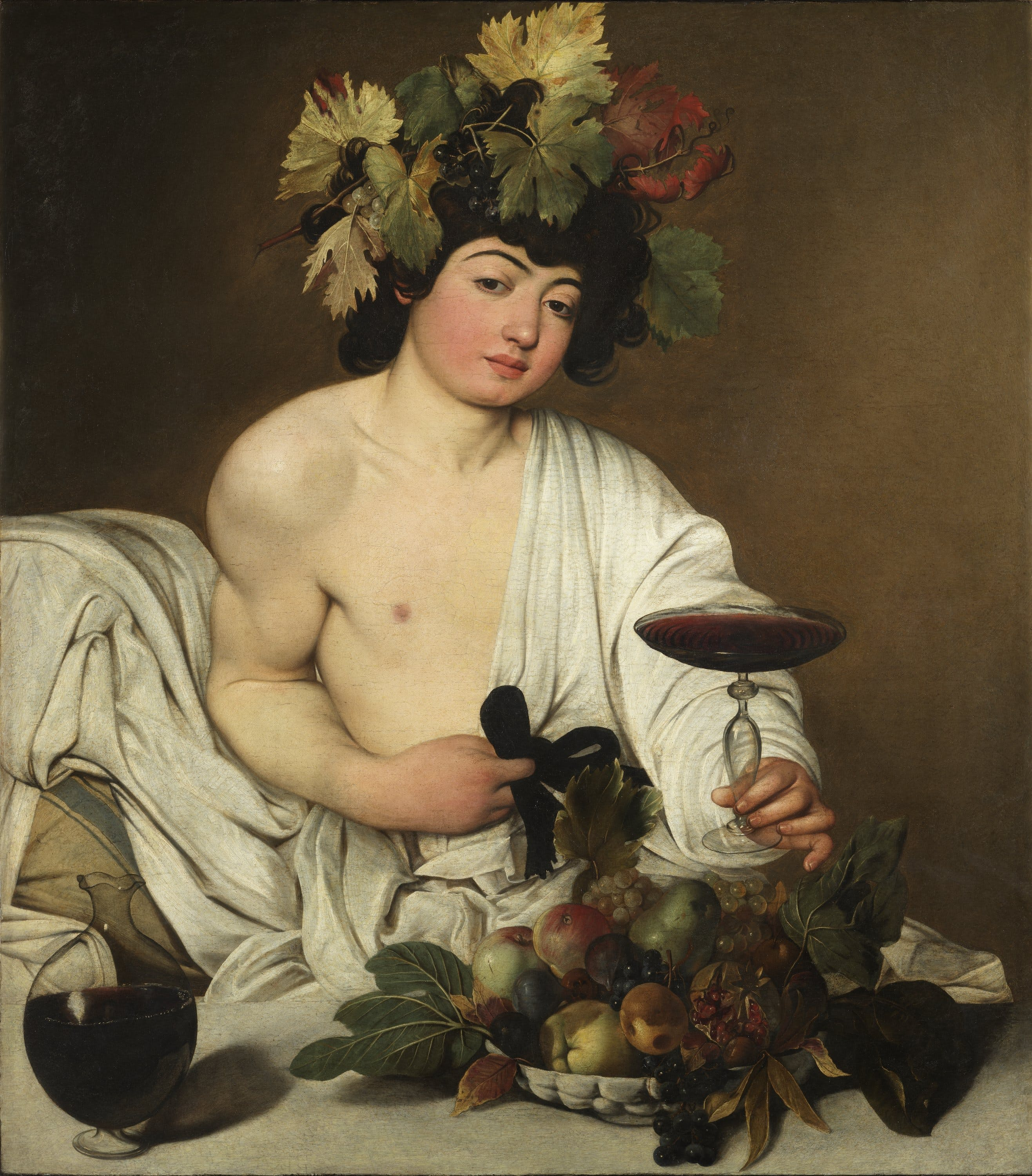
Caravaggio, Bacchus, c. 1595, Oil on canvas, 95 x 85 cm., Galleria degli Uffizi, Florence

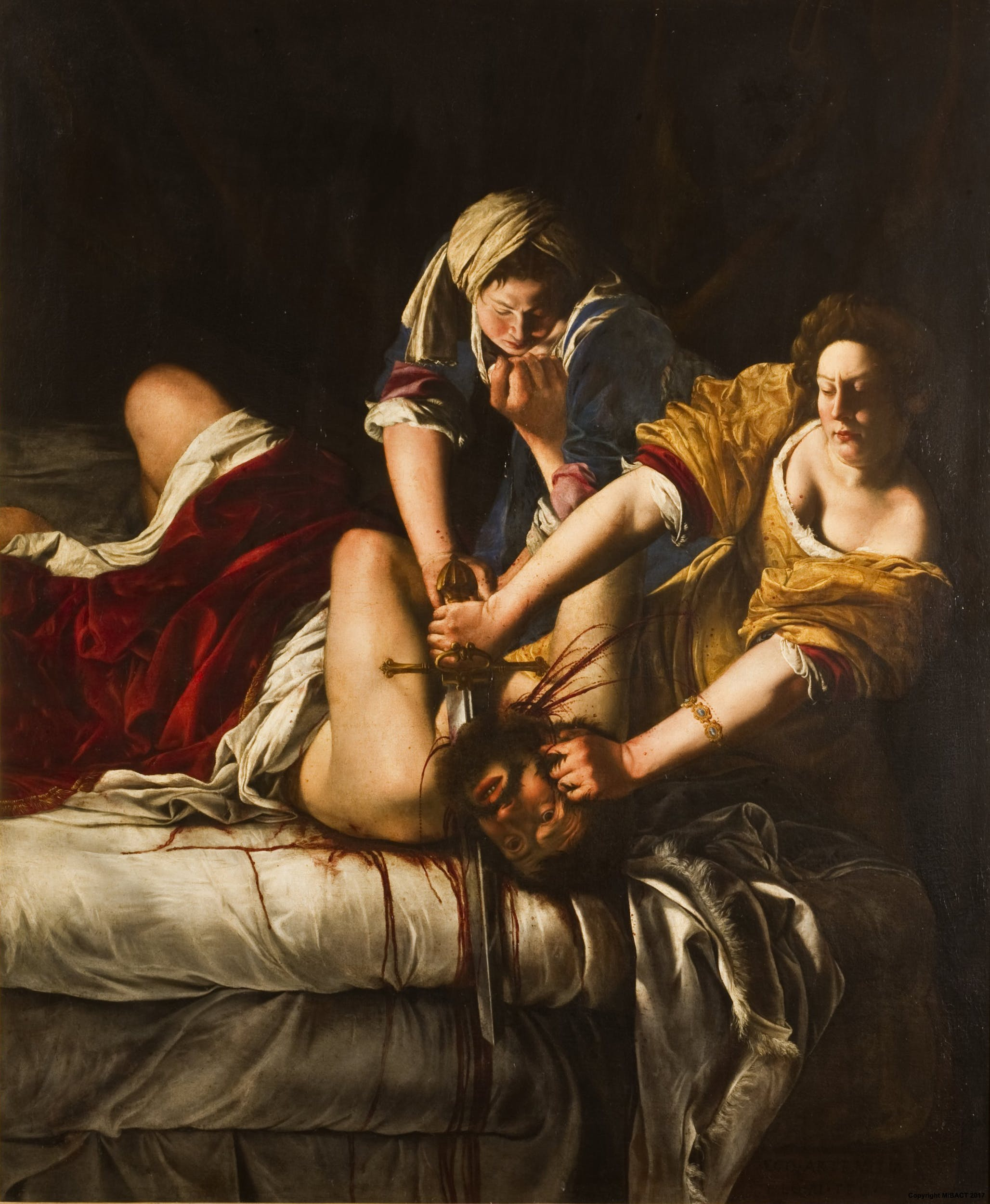
Artemisia Gentileschi, Judith Slaying Holofernes, 1614–20, oil on canvas, 199 x 162 cm Galleria degli Uffizi, Florence

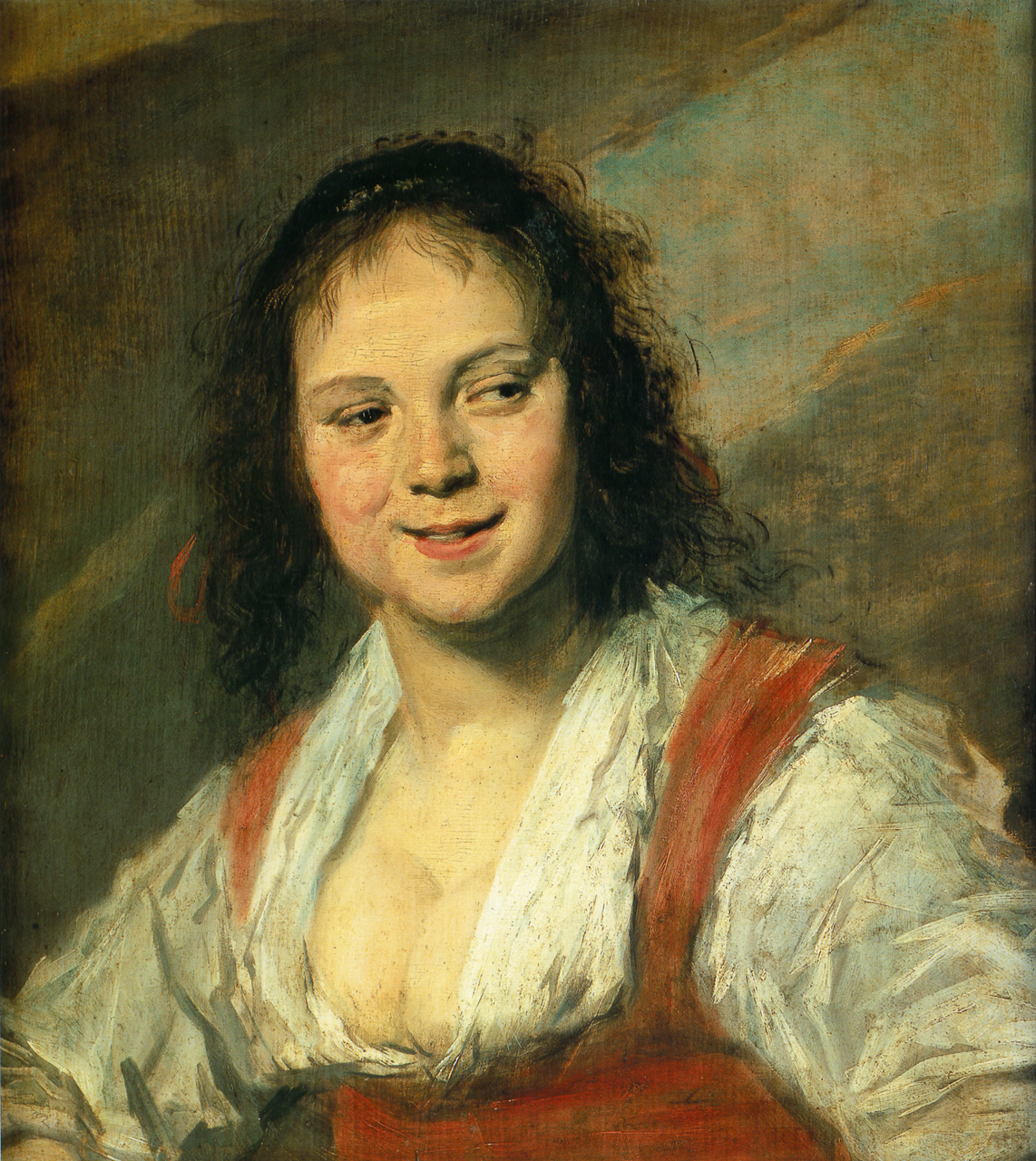
Frans Hals Gypsy Girl, 1628–30, oil on wood, 58 x 52 cm., Musée du Louvre, Paris

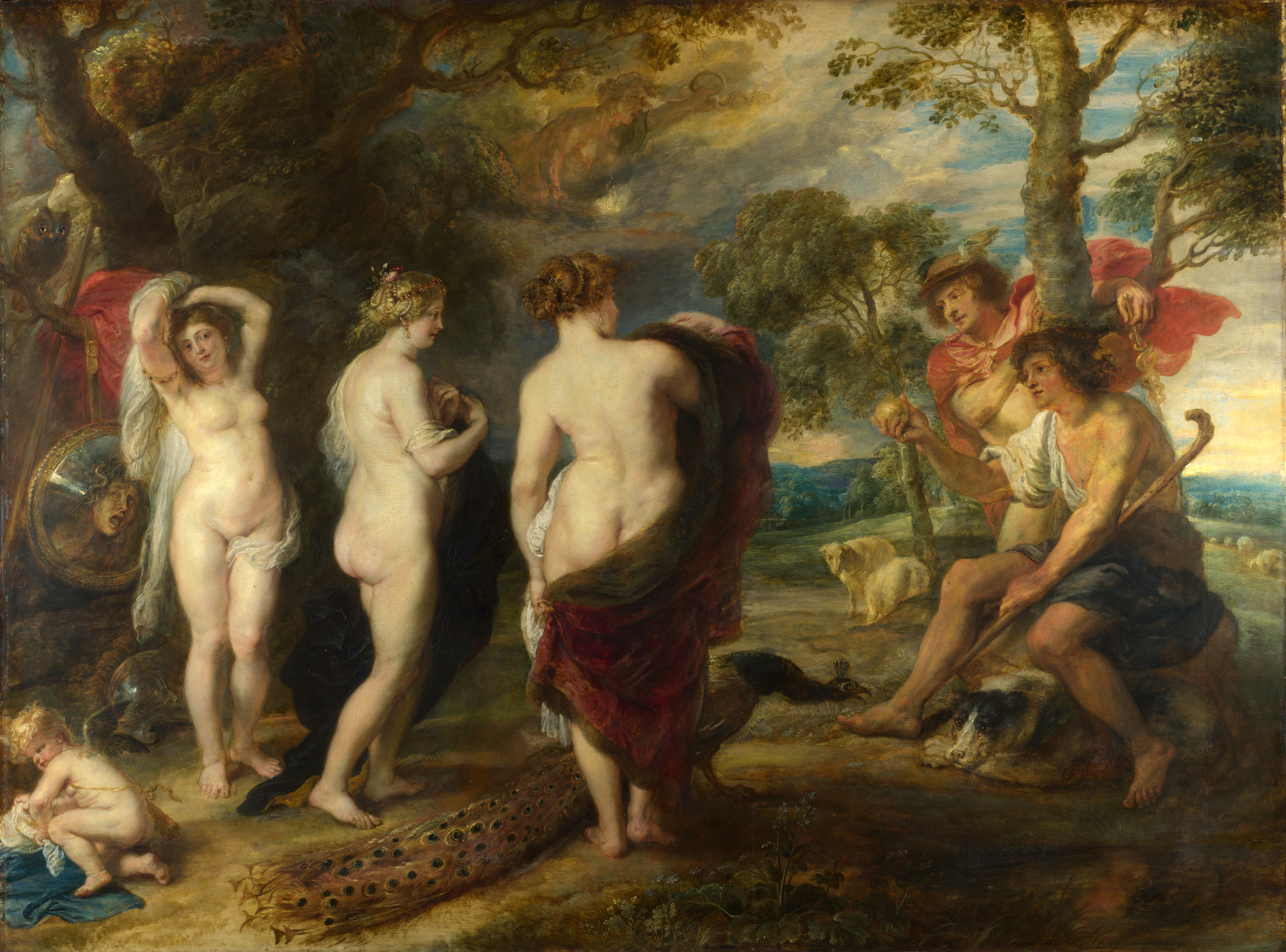
Peter Paul Rubens, Judgement of Paris, c. 1636, National Gallery, London

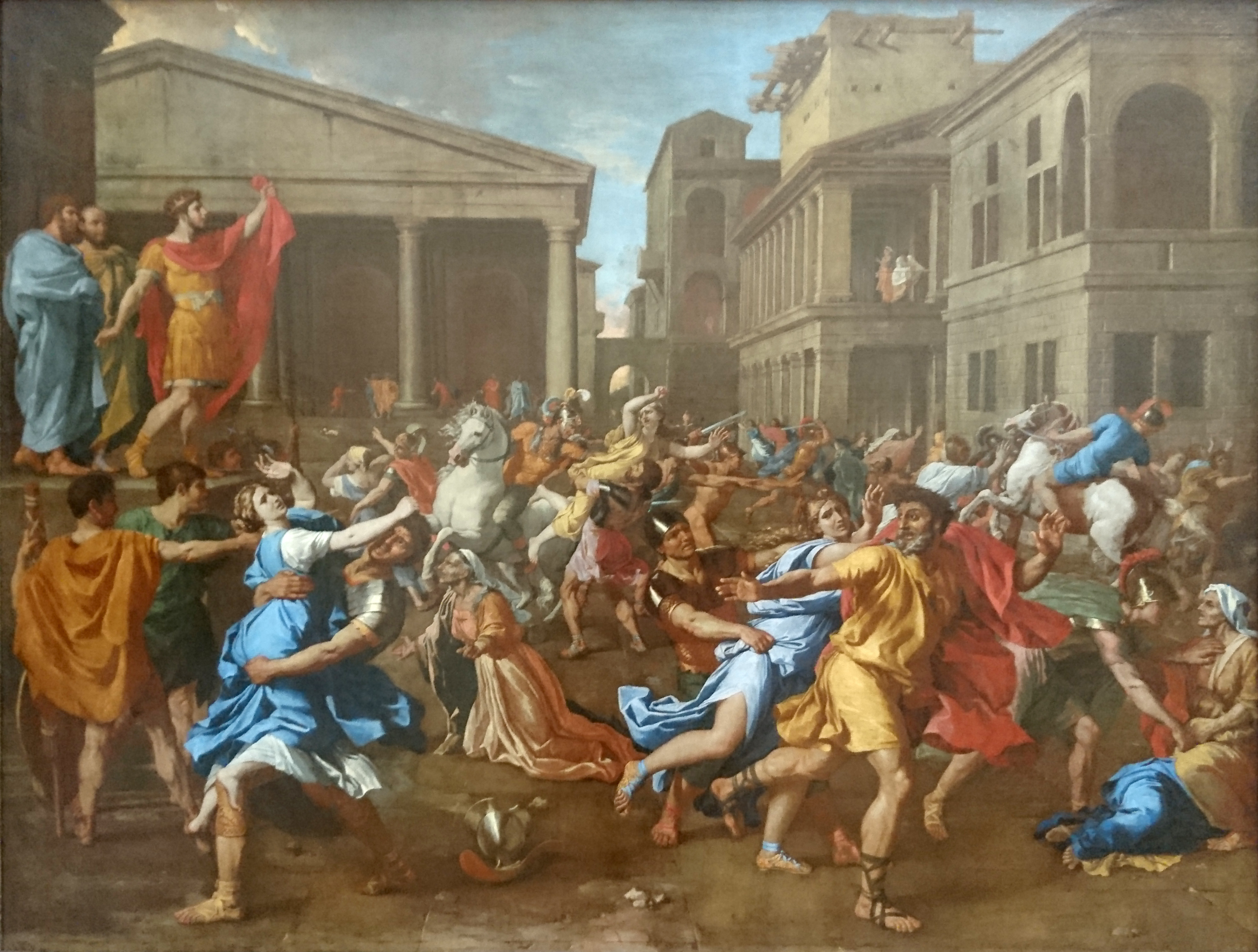
Nicolas Poussin, The Rape of the Sabine Women, 1637–38, Louvre, Paris

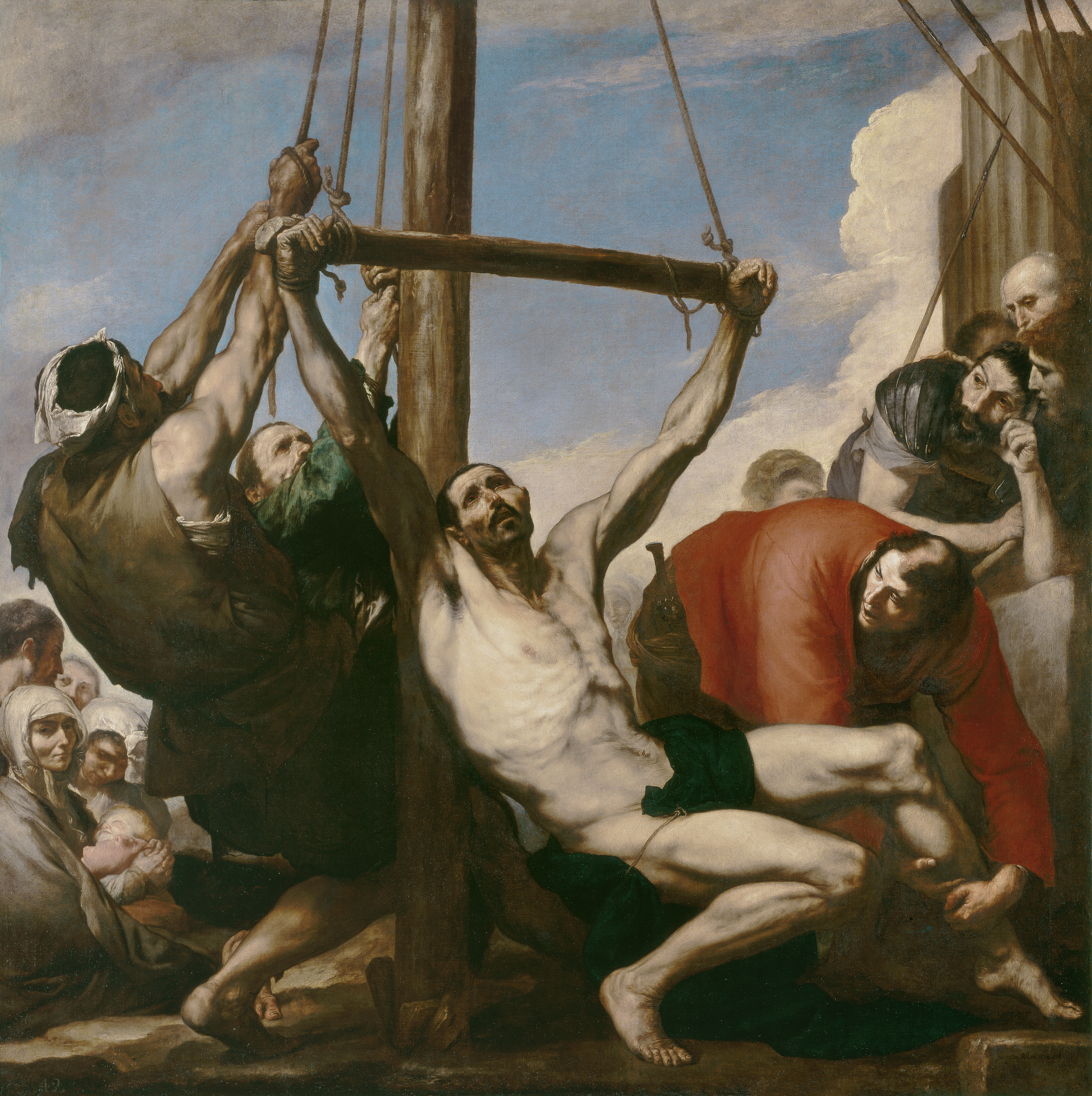
José de Ribera, Martyrdom of St Philip, 1639, Prado, Madrid

Teodor Ilić Češljar, The Martyrdom of St. Barbara, 1785, National Museum of Serbia

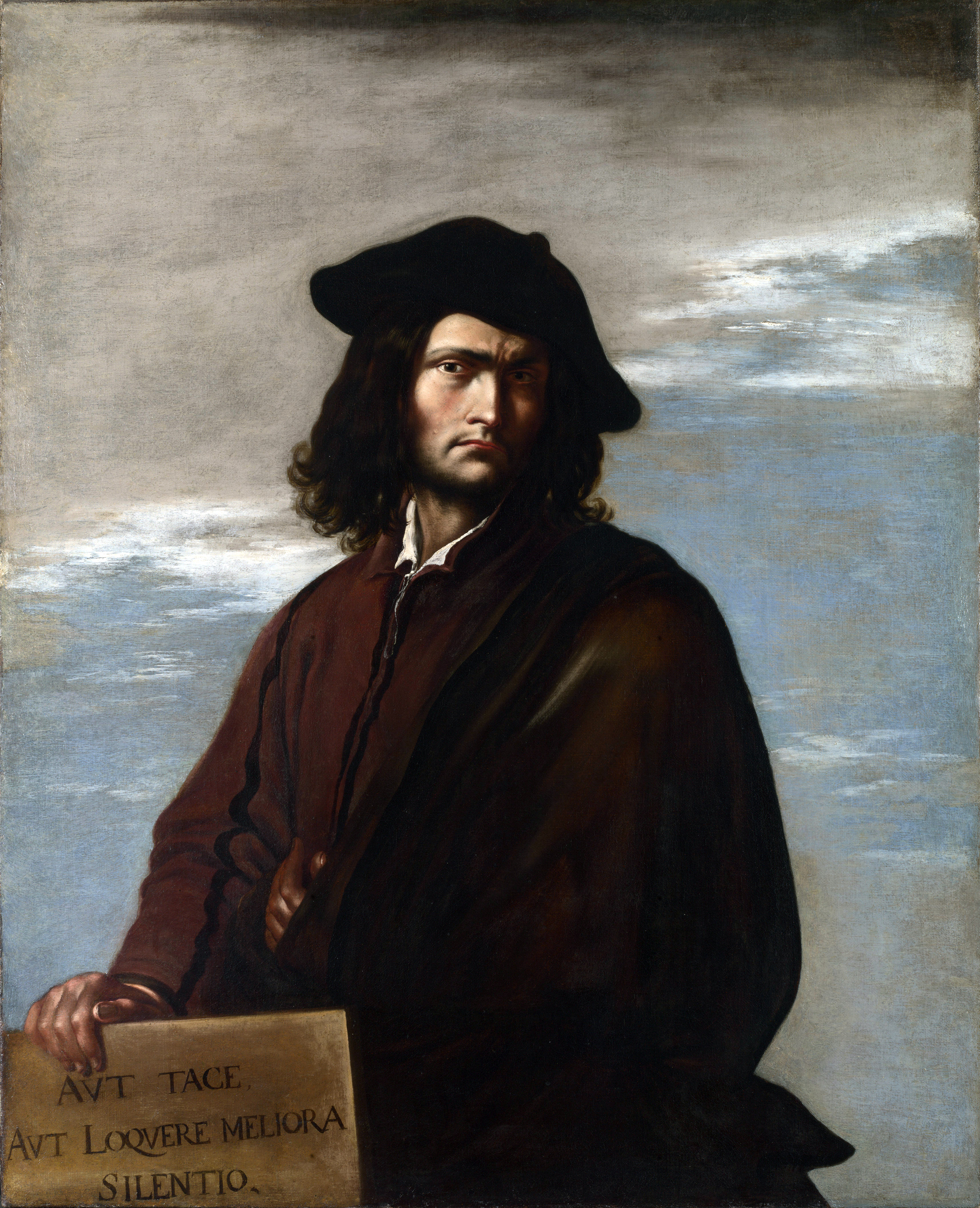
Salvator Rosa, Philosophy, Of Silence and Speech, Silence is better, 1640, National Gallery, London

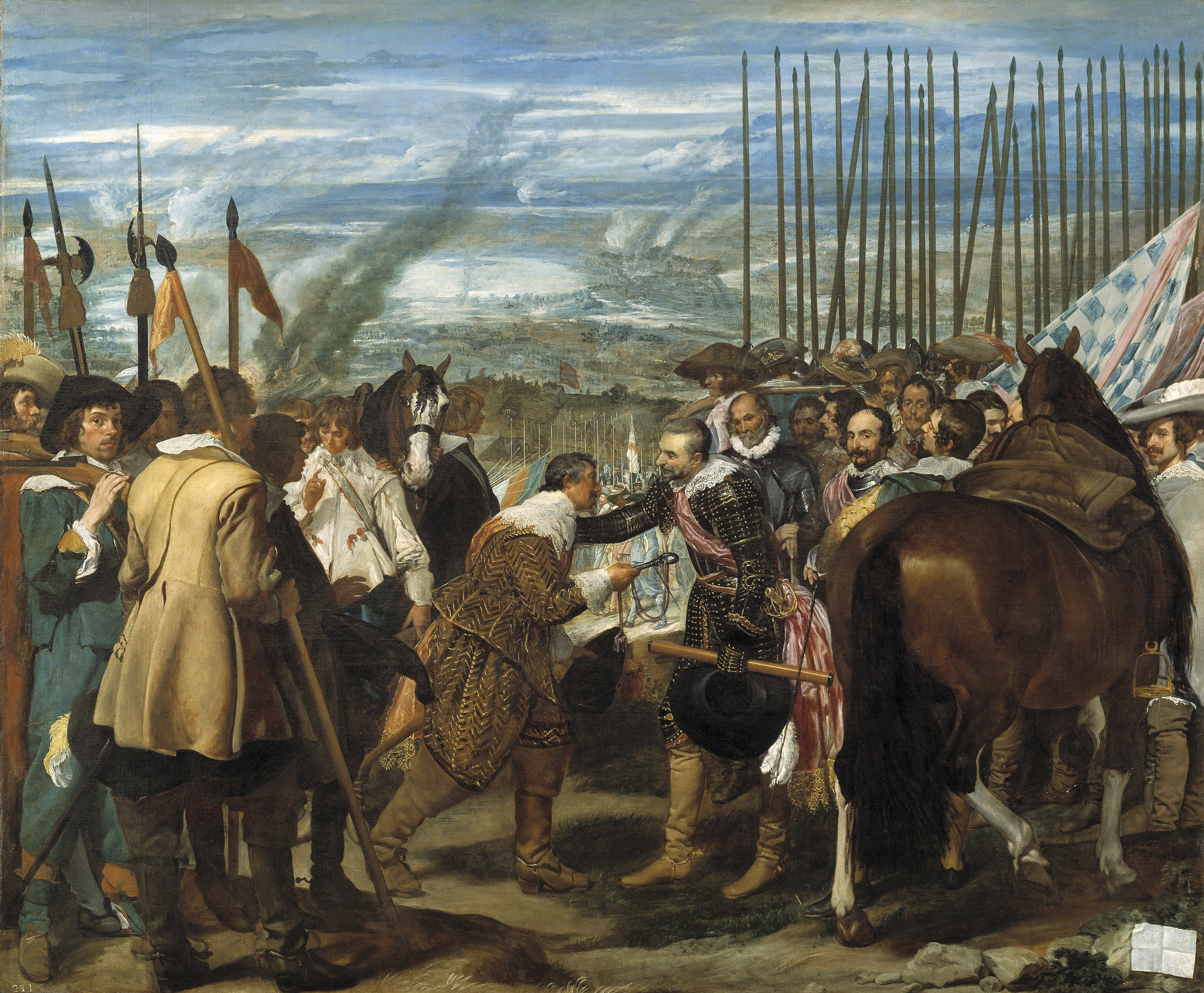
Diego Velázquez, The Surrender of Breda, 1635, oil on canvas, Museo del Prado, Madrid

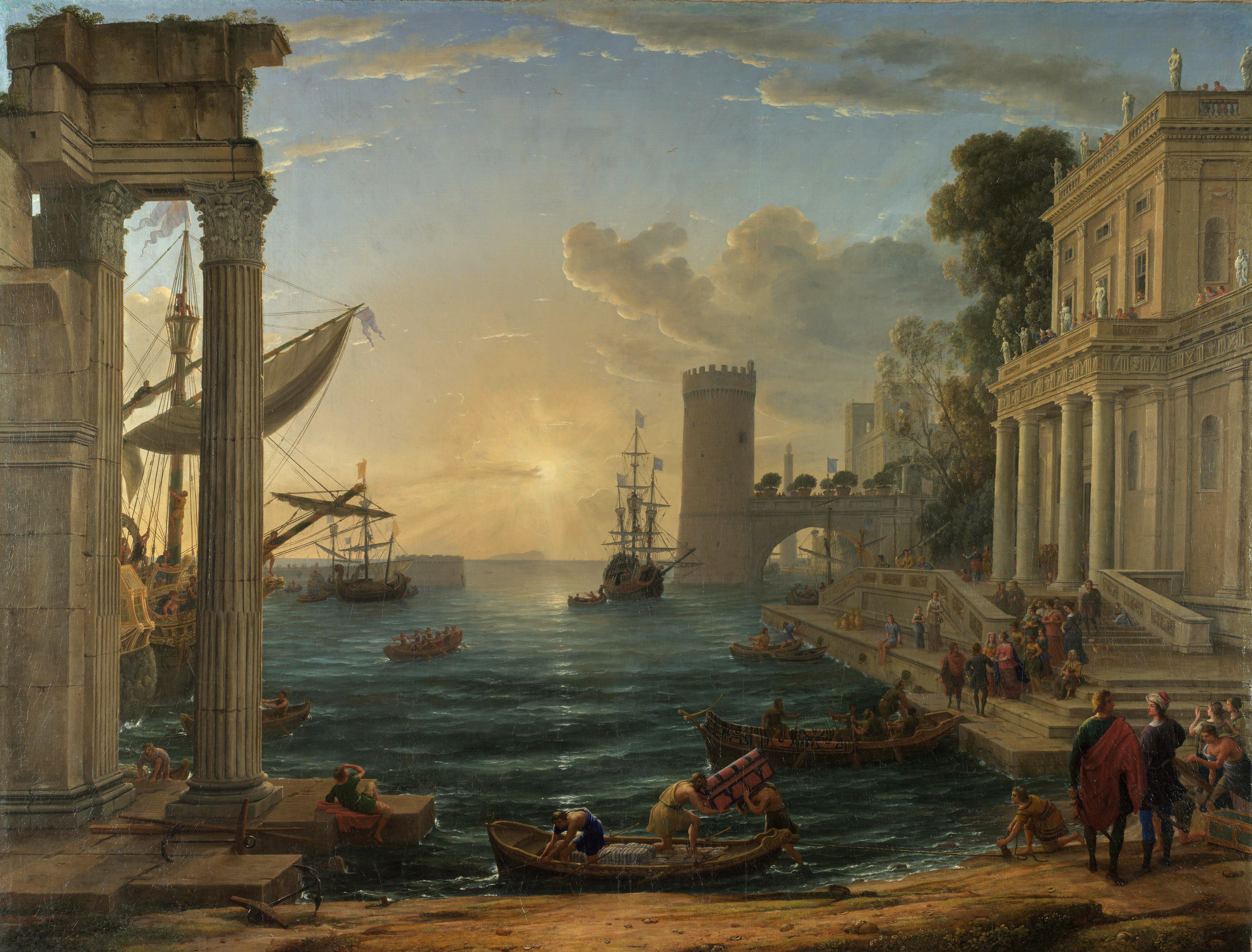
Claude Lorrain, The Embarkation of the Queen of Sheba, 1648, 149 × 194 cm., National Gallery, London

Diego Velázquez, Las Meninas, 1656–57, oil on canvas, 318 x 276 cm, Museo del Prado, Madrid

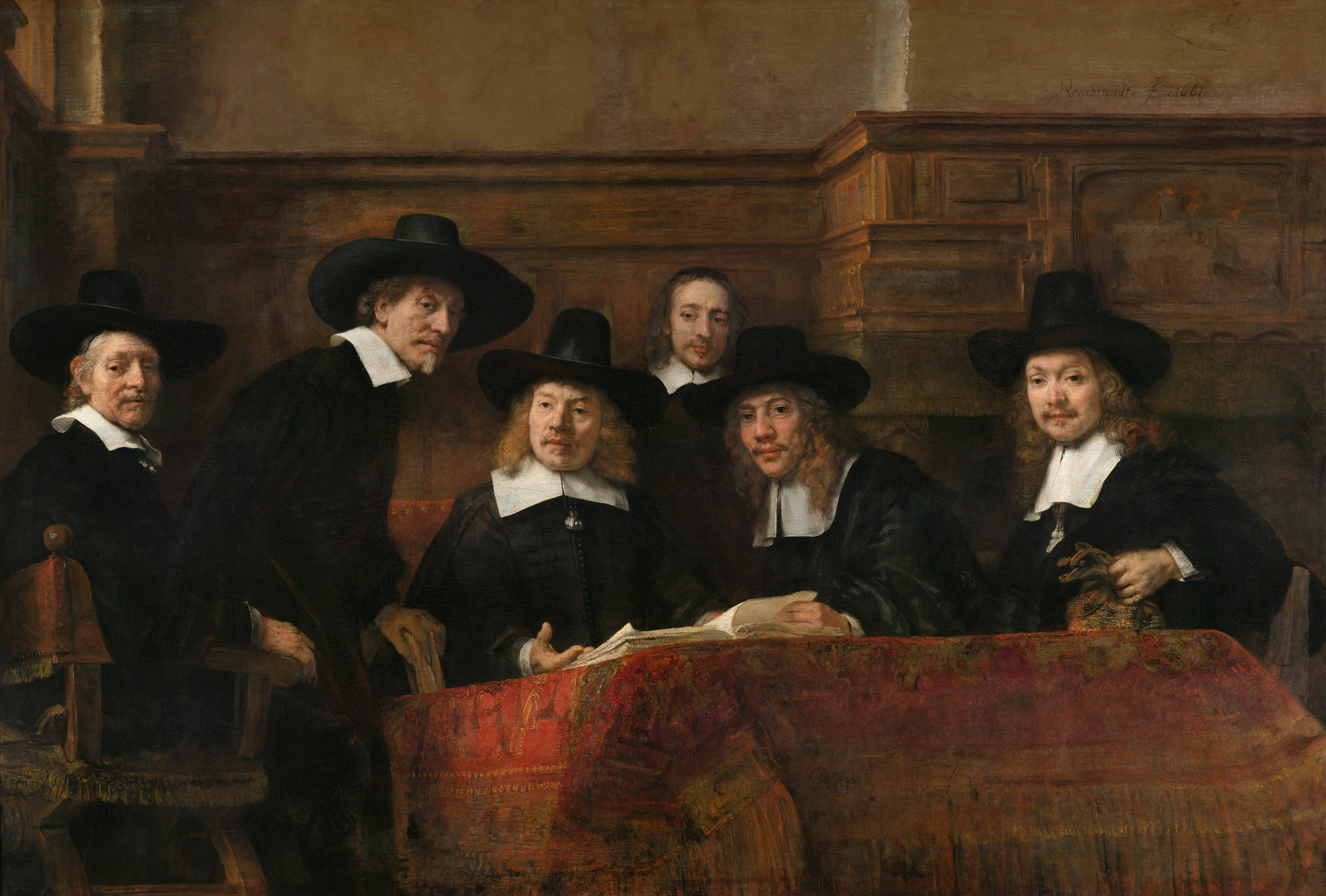
Rembrandt van Rijn, The Syndics of the Clothmaker's Guild, 1662, oil on canvas, 191.5 cm × 279 cm (75.4 in × 109.8 in), Rijksmuseum, Amsterdam

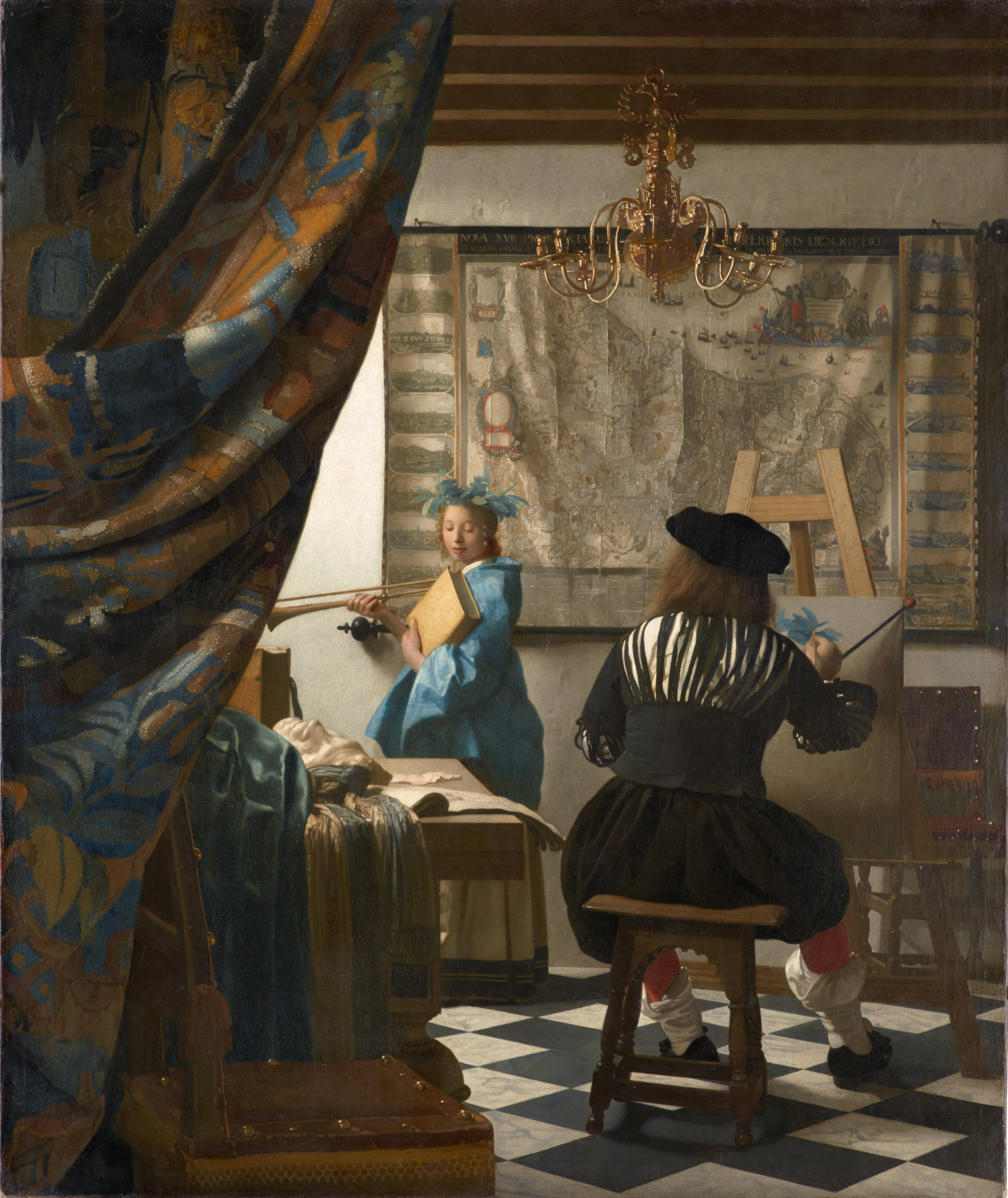
Jan Vermeer, The Allegory of Painting or The Art of Painting, 1666–67, 130 x 110 cm., Kunsthistorisches Museum, Vienna

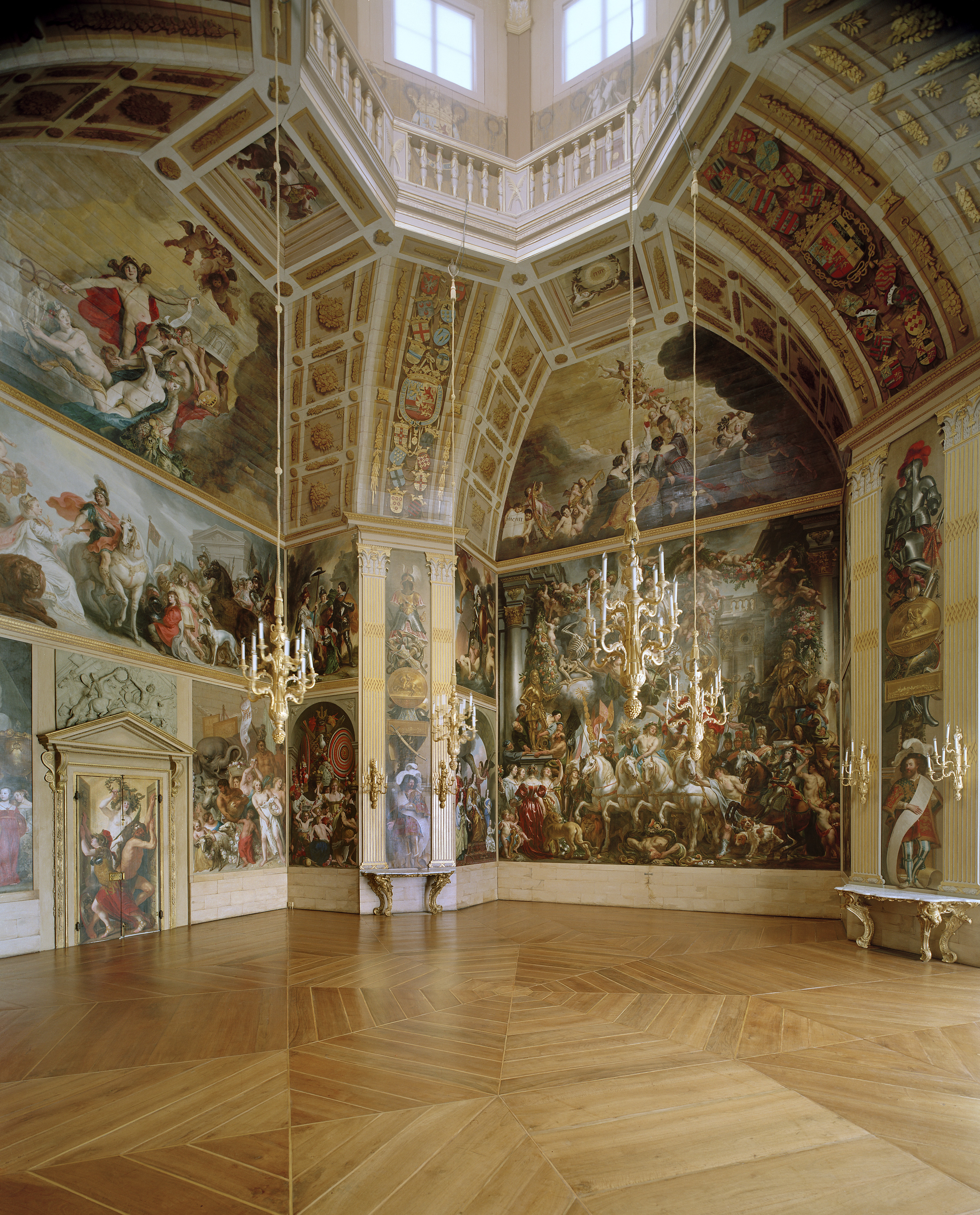
The Oranjezaal refers to a baroque painted ballroom in the royal palace Huis ten Bosch in The Hague. The largest painting is Triumph of Frederick Henry, Prince of Orange by Jacob Jordaens, 1652, 728 cm × 755 cm.

== See also ==
- Baroque illusionistic painting
- History of painting
- Western painting
- Rococo Painting

== Reading ==
- Belkin, Kristin Lohse (1998). Rubens. Phaidon Press. ISBN 0-7148-3412-2.
- Belting, Hans (1994). Likeness and Presence: A History of the Image before the Era of Art. Edmund Jephcott. University of Chicago Press. ISBN 0-226-04215-4.
- Mark Getlein, Living With Art, 8th edition.
- Gombrich, E.H., The Story of Art, Phaidon, 1995. ISBN 0-7148-3355-X
- Christine Buci-Glucksmann, Baroque Reason: The Aesthetics of Modernity, Sage, 1994
- Michael Kitson, 1966. The Age of Baroque
- Heinrich Wölfflin, 1964. Renaissance and Baroque (Reprinted 1984; originally published in German, 1888) The classic study. ISBN 0-8014-9046-4
