= Visitation (Albertinelli) =

1503 painting by Mariotto Albertinelli

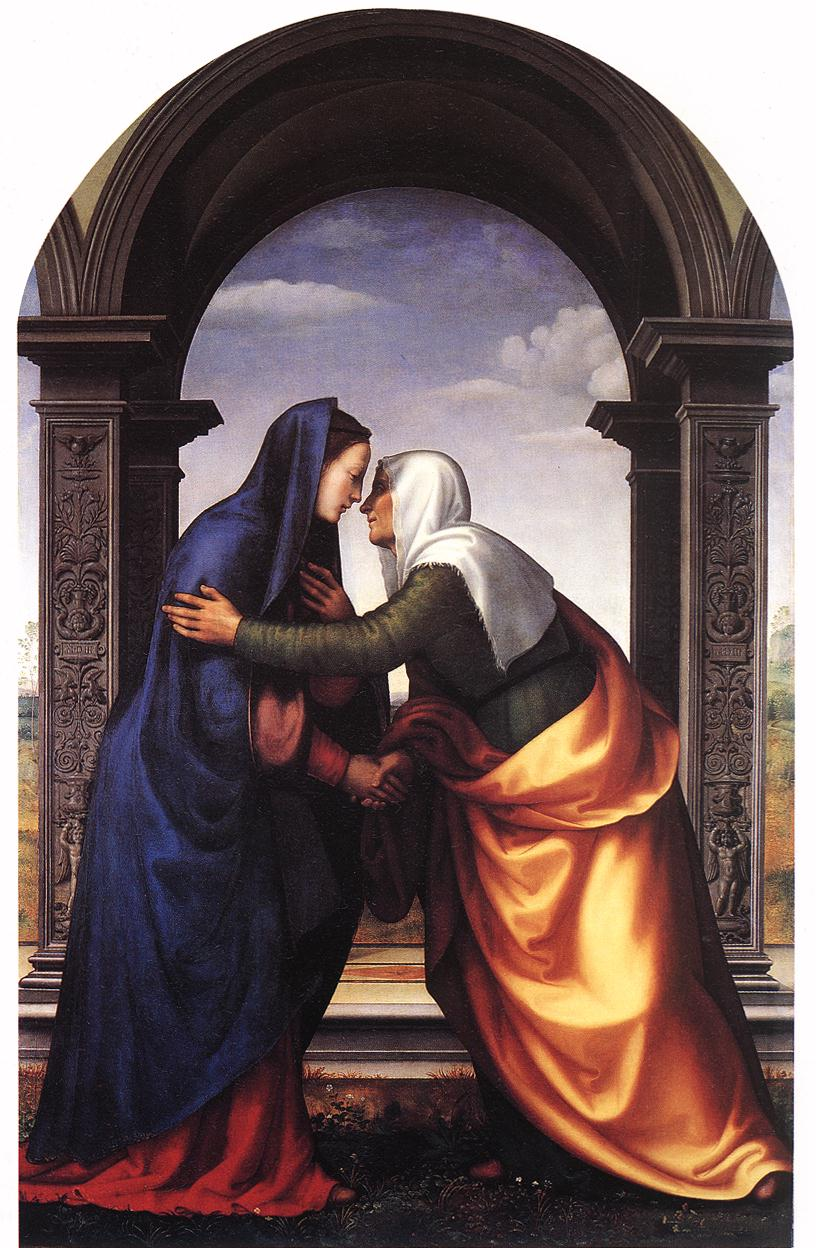
- Artist: Mariotto Albertinelli
- Year: 1503
- Medium: oil on panel
- Dimensions: 232,5 cm × 146,5 cm (915 in × 577 in)
- Location: Uffizi, Florence

Visitation is a 1503 painting of the Visitation of the Virgin Mary to Elizabeth by Mariotto Albertinelli. The date is shown on both columns in the work. It is now in the Uffizi in Florence.

According to Vasari, the work is from the Sant'Elisabetta della congrega dei Preti chapel in Florence's church of San Michele alle Trombe (a church rededicated to Elizabeth in 1517). Albertinelli collaborated with Fra Bartolomeo until 1503, when the latter took his vows as a Dominican. However, drawings now in the Louvre show that the two artists created the painting's composition together at some stage before this date. The painting itself was produced largely without studio assistance by Albertinelli, whose signature was found on the work during restoration work in 1995.

The background landscape draws on the work of Perugino, whilst the detailed plants at the women's feet are influenced by similar ones by Leonardo da Vinci. The almost metallic palette anticipates that of the Doni Tondo by Michelangelo.

== Predella ==
The main painting originally had a predella, consisting of scenes of the Annunciation, the Adoration of the Christ Child and the Circumcision of Jesus.
