= Visitation (Cariani) =

c. 1525 painting by Giovanni Cariani

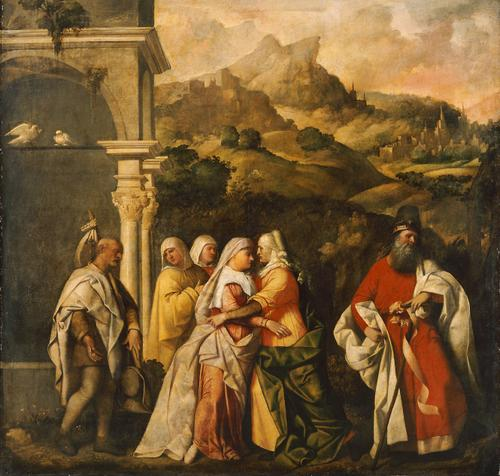
Visitation (c. 1524–1528) by Giovanni Cariani

Visitation is an oil on canvas painting of the Visitation by Italian painter Giovanni Cariani, from c. 1524–1528. It is unrecorded before its appearance in the 1929 catalogue of the Kunsthistorisches Museum in Vienna, where it still hangs. No commissioner or precise date can be ascribed to it.
