= The Visit (poetry collection) =

Poetry collection by Ian Hamilton

Cover

The Visit is a collection of poems by Ian Hamilton published in 1970 by Faber and Faber. This was a somewhat reworked and expanded version of the 1964 pamphlet. The thirty-three poems contained in The Visit all reflect Hamilton's concise writing style. Hamilton subsequently spoke about the relationship between the stressful circumstances of his personal life — in particular the mental illness of his wife; and the brevity of the poems.
