= Visitation (Perugino) =

Painting attributed to Perugino

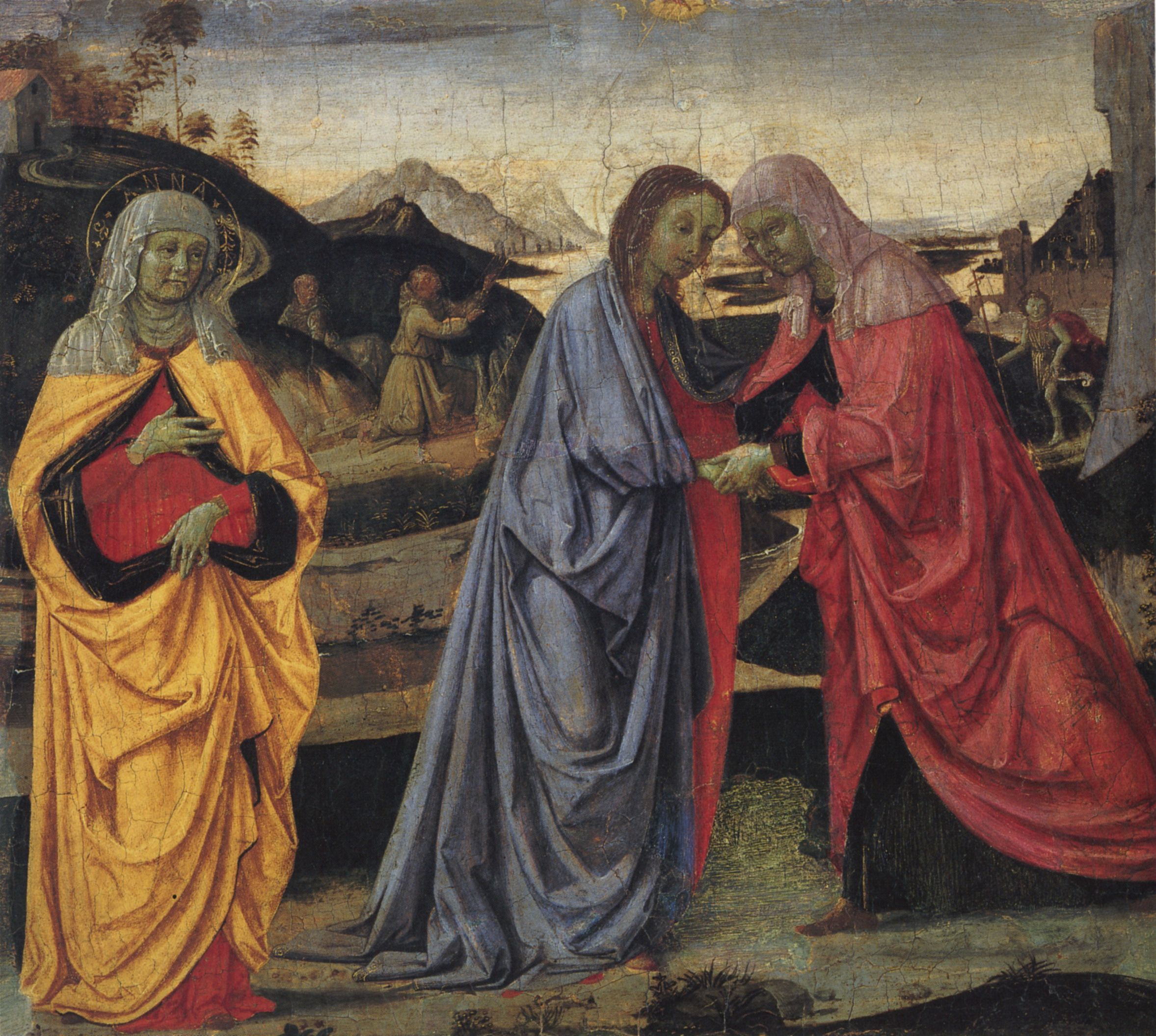
- Artist: Perugino
- Year: c.1472–1473
- Medium: Tempera on panel
- Dimensions: 32 cm × 34 cm (13 in × 13 in)
- Location: Galleria dell'Accademia, Florence

Visitation is a tempera on panel painting usually attributed to Perugino, executed c. 1472–1473, now in the Galleria dell'Accademia in Florence. An early work by the artist from around the same time as Nativity of the Virgin, while he was still heavily influenced by Andrea del Verrocchio, it probably originated as part of the predella for a lost altarpiece. It shows the Visitation, with the Virgin Mary's mother Saint Anne to the left. In the left background is Francis of Assisi receiving the stigmata and in the right background is Florence's patron saint, John the Baptist - this may indicate that the lost altarpiece was intended for a Franciscan monastery in Florence such as Santa Croce.

There is debate over the painting's attribution to Perugino - Mackowsky, Raimond van Marle and Ugo Procacci instead attributed it to Jacopo del Sellaio or his school. The attribution to Perugino was first mooted in 1959 at a conference by Federico Zeri. Anna Padoa Rizzo agrees, but Jean K. Cadogan attributes it to Domenico Ghirlandaio instead.
