= Philosophy (Salvator Rosa) =

Painting by Salvator Rosa

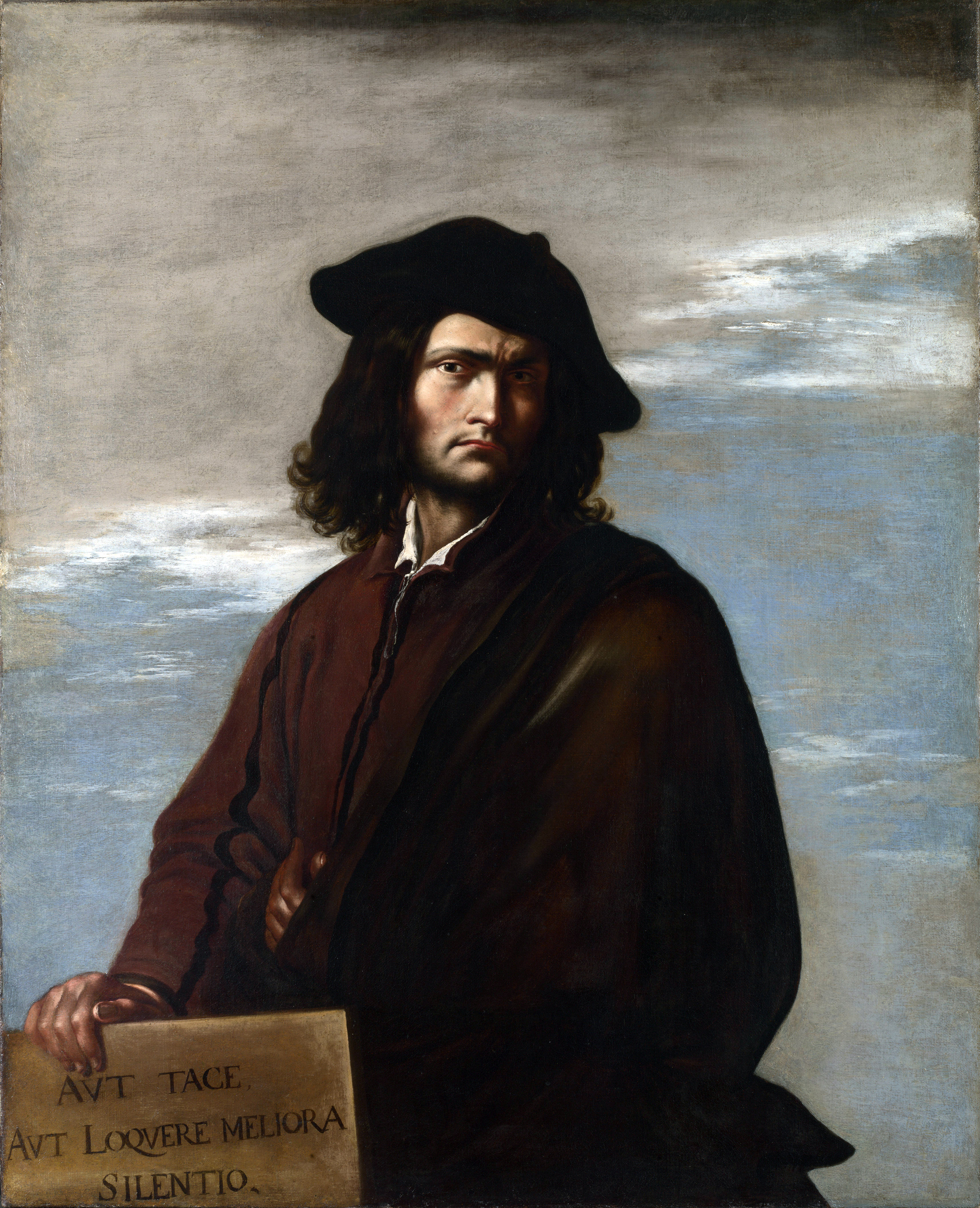
Salvator Rosa, Philosophy, c. 1645, National Gallery, London

Philosophy is an oil-on-canvas self-portrait of Salvator Rosa, the Italian Baroque artist who is best known for his imaginary landscapes. The painting is usually interpreted as a personification of philosophy. It is dated to c. 1645 and has been held by the National Gallery in London since 1933.

The painting measures 116.3 cm × 94 cm (45.8 in × 37.0 in). The artist has depicted himself in this three-quarter-length portrait wearing a black scholar's cap over his long and untidy hair, against a stormy grey sky. The viewpoint is below the sitter, who looks down at the viewer with a sombre expression. The right side of his unshaven face is heavily shadowed, emphasising his long narrow nose. His left-hand holds his gown closed, with the collar of a white shirt appearing at the neck. The right hand holds a plaque which bears the Latin inscription AVT TACE / AVT LOQVERE MELIORA / SILENTIO, which may be translated as "Be quiet, unless your speech be better than silence" or "Either keep quiet, or say something better than silence". The Latin is taken from the Anthologia of Stobaeus, a collection of quotations from Ancient Greek authors published in the 5th century AD. Rosa wished to increase his artistic reputation by becoming known as a painter of philosophical subjects, rather than landscapes less valued in the hierarchy of genres. Rosa published his anthology of sayings, Il Teatro della Politica, in 1669; this included entries on the virtue of silence.

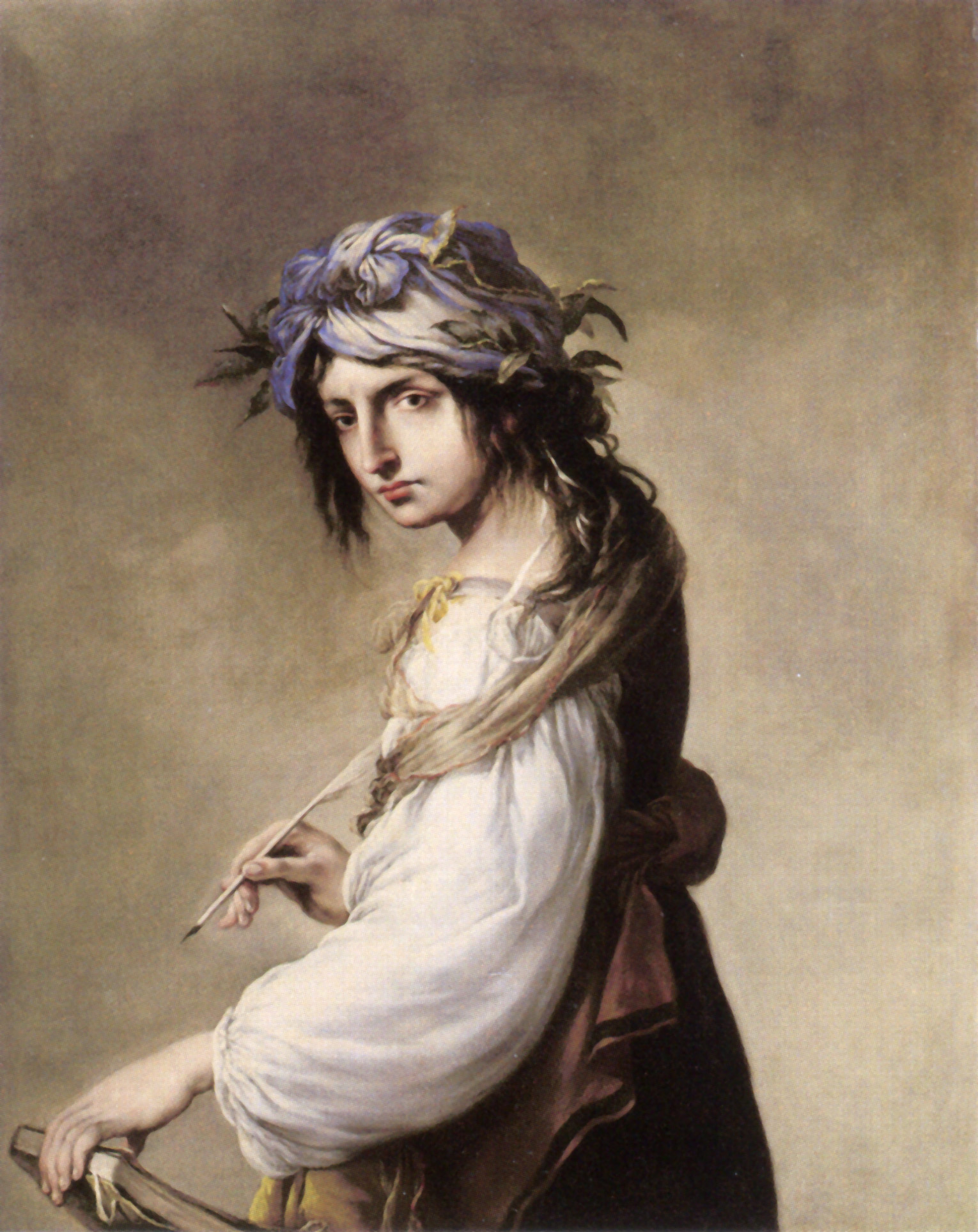
Salvator Rosa, Poetry, 1640–1641, Wadsworth Atheneum, Hartford, Connecticut

Rosa made the painting around 1645 for Filippo Niccolini, who was among his circle of friends in Florence and had served as tutor and then as chamberlain to Rosa's patron Giovanni Carlo de' Medici. Though the work was long thought to be a self-portrait due to an inscription on the reverse of the painting, recent scholarship has suggested that it was intended as a personification of philosophy. It may have been intended as a pendant painting to his 1640 painting Poetry, 116.2 cm × 94.6 cm (45.7 in × 37.2 in), now held in the Wadsworth Atheneum, which depicts Rosa's female companion Lucrezia as a personification of Poetry with a similar size and composition against a similarly plain background. That work was also owned by the Niccolini family in Florence until it was sold to Rev. John Sanford (1777–1855) in the 1830s. It later entered the collection of the Marquess of Lansdowne at Bowood House, where it remained until 1955 (when most of the dilapidated house was demolished); it was sold to the Wadsworth Atheneum in 1956.

Philosophy was presented to the National Gallery in 1933, by Henry Petty-Fitzmaurice, 6th Marquess of Lansdowne, in memory of his father, the 5th Marquess, who had died in 1927.

A different self-portrait by Rosa, dating to c. 1645 and in the Musée des Beaux-Arts de Strasbourg, depicts the artist with a bushy beard and dark hair; another of 1647 in the Metropolitan Museum of Art similarly has a long beard and hair, while a third in Detroit, of c. 1650–1660, is similar to a painting of Rosa dressed as a soldier in Siena, c. 1640–1649.

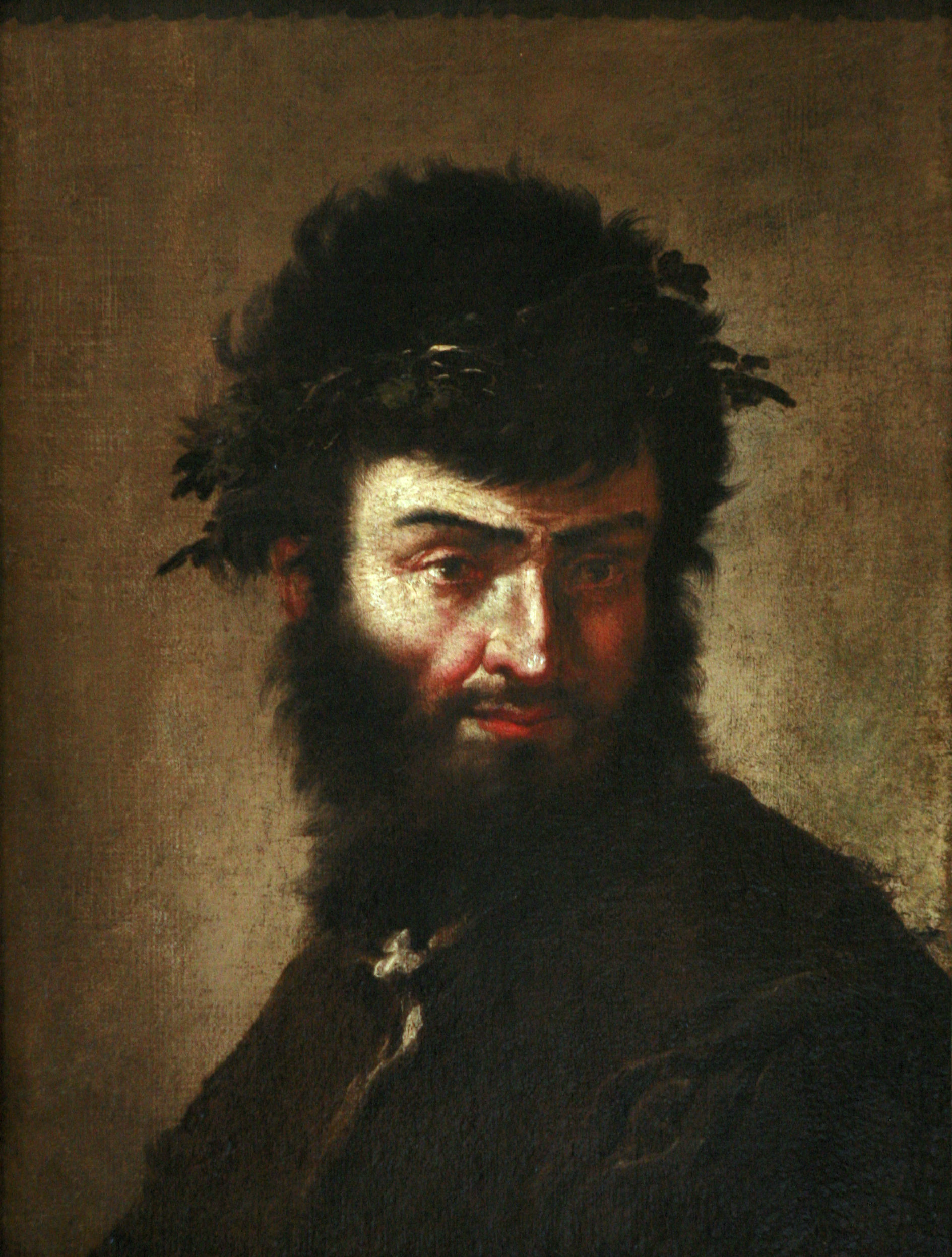
Salvator Rosa, Self-portrait, c. 1645, Musée des Beaux-Arts de Strasbourg

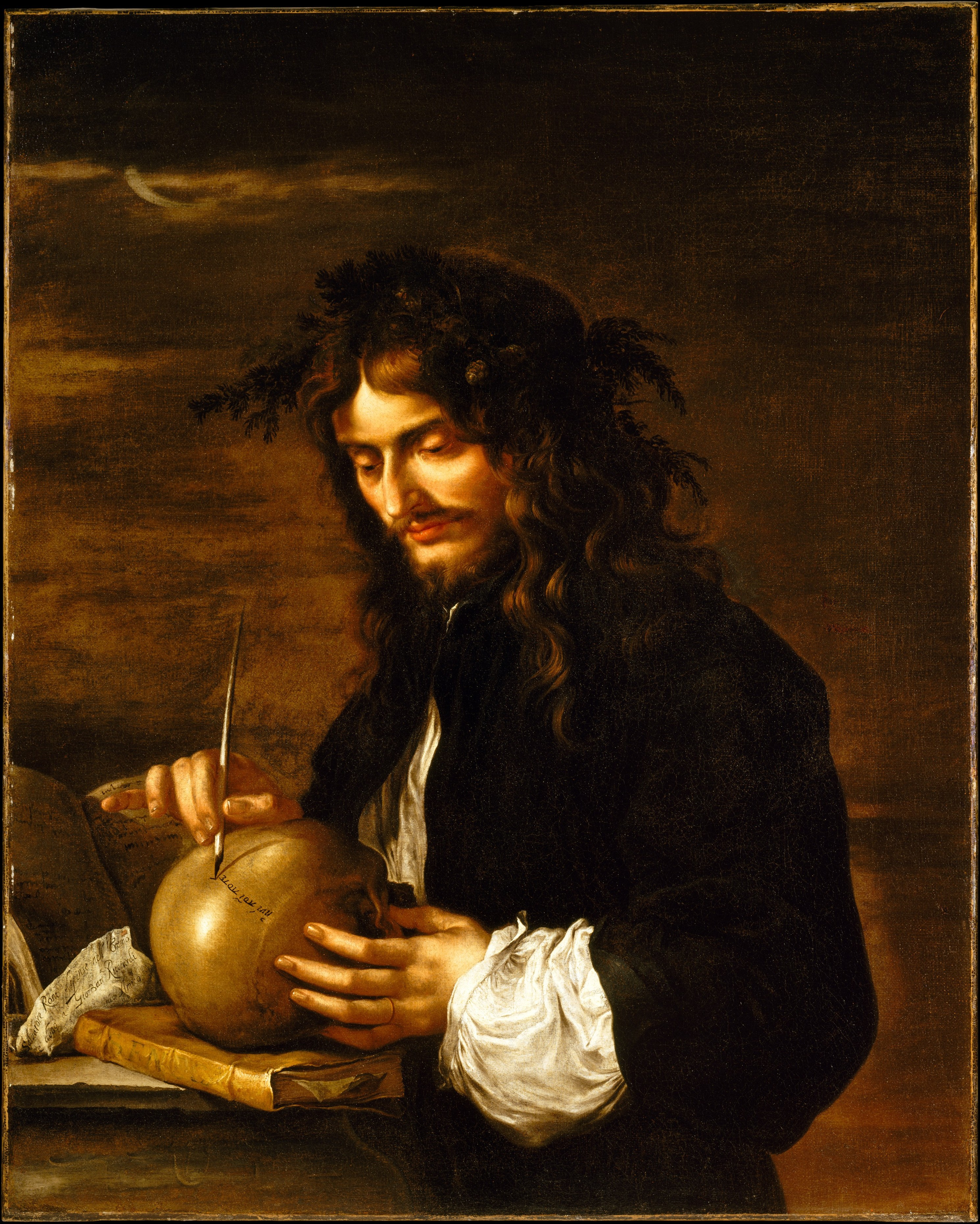
Salvator Rosa, Self-portrait, c. 1647, Metropolitan Museum of Art, New York

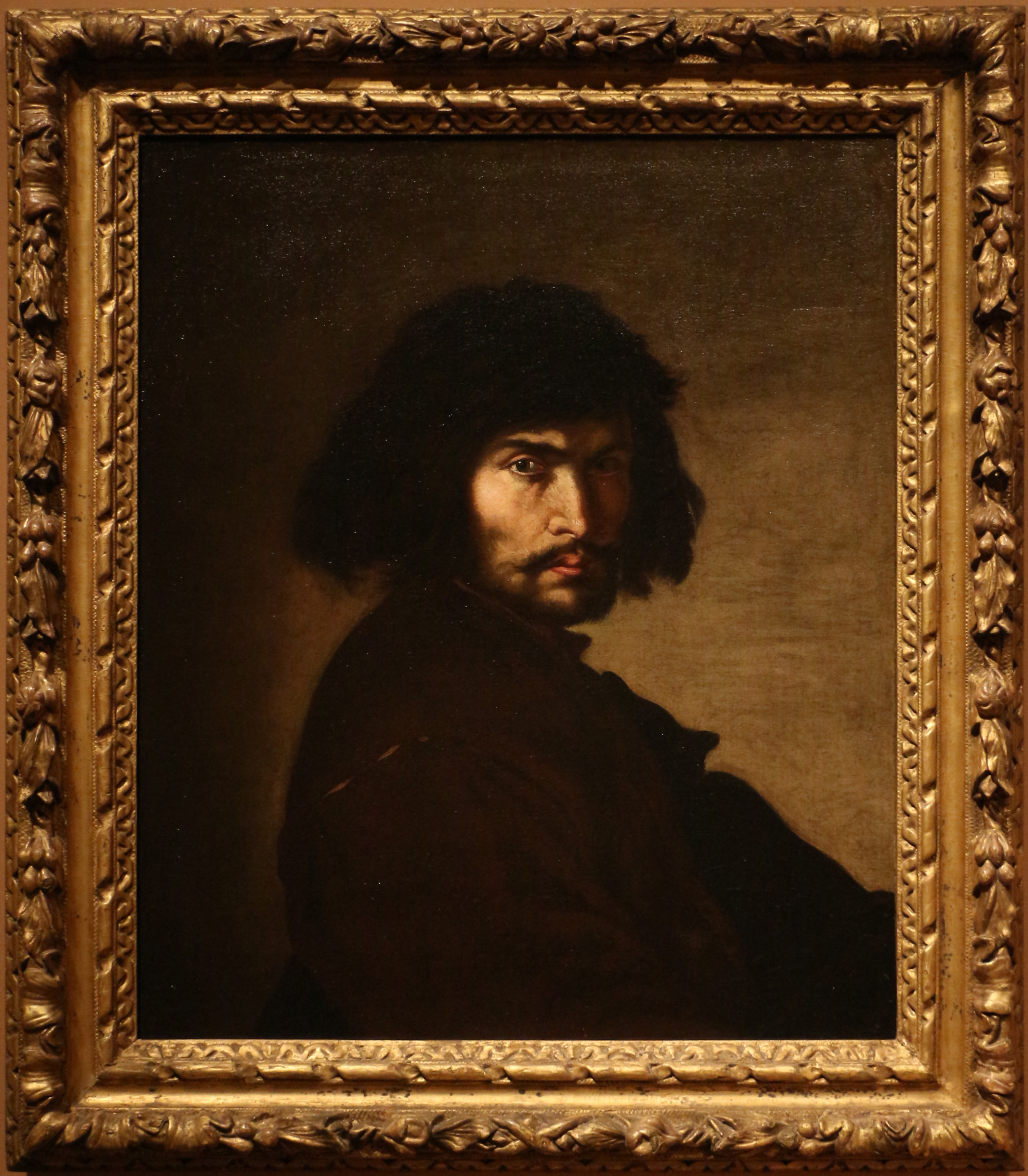
Salvator Rosa, Self-portrait, c. 1650–1660, Detroit Institute of Arts

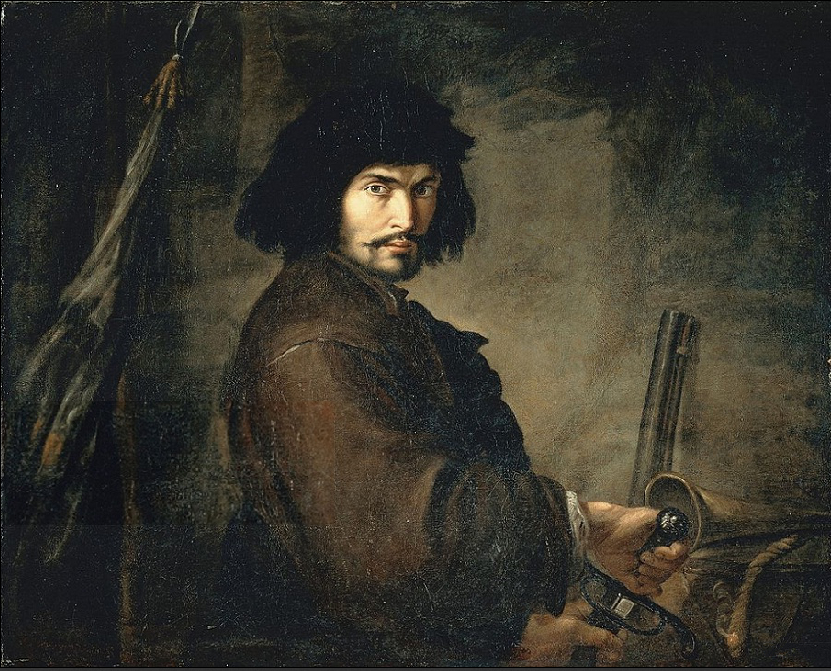
Salvator Rosa, Self-portrait as a soldier, c. 1640–1649, Siena
