= The Dream of Aeneas (Salvator Rosa) =

c. 1660 painting by Salvator Rosa

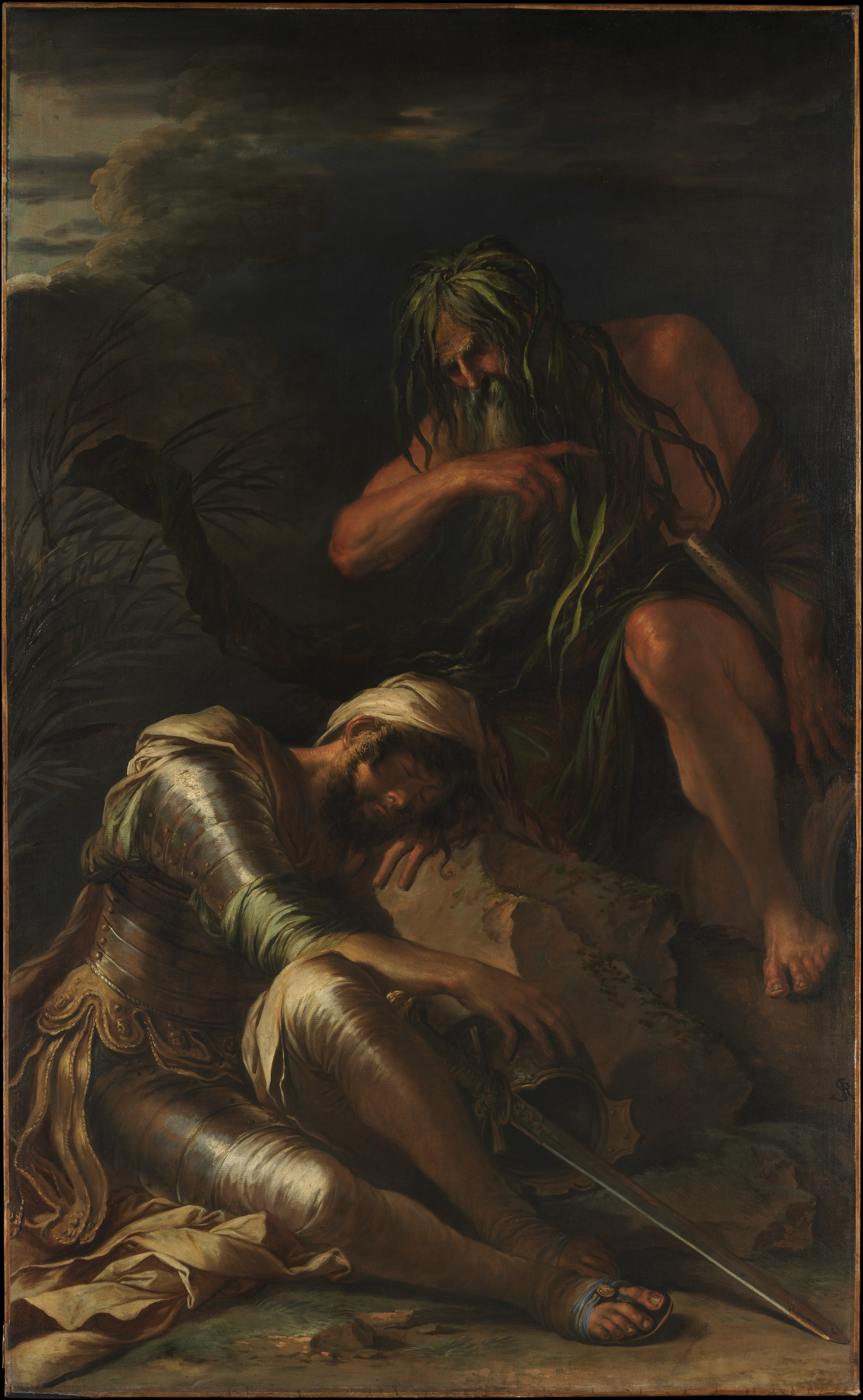
- Artist: Salvator Rosa
- Year: c. 1660–1665
- Medium: Oil on canvas
- Dimensions: 196.9 cm × 120.7 cm (77.5 in × 47.5 in)
- Location: Metropolitan Museum of Art, New York

The Dream of Aeneas is an oil-on-canvas painting by Italian artist Salvator Rosa dating to c. 1660–1665. It depicts a scene from the Roman poet Virgil's Aeneid in which an embodiment of the Tiber river speaks to the Trojan hero Aeneas while he is dreaming. The work is in the collection of the Metropolitan Museum of Art, in New York.
