= Outline of Yellowstone National Park =

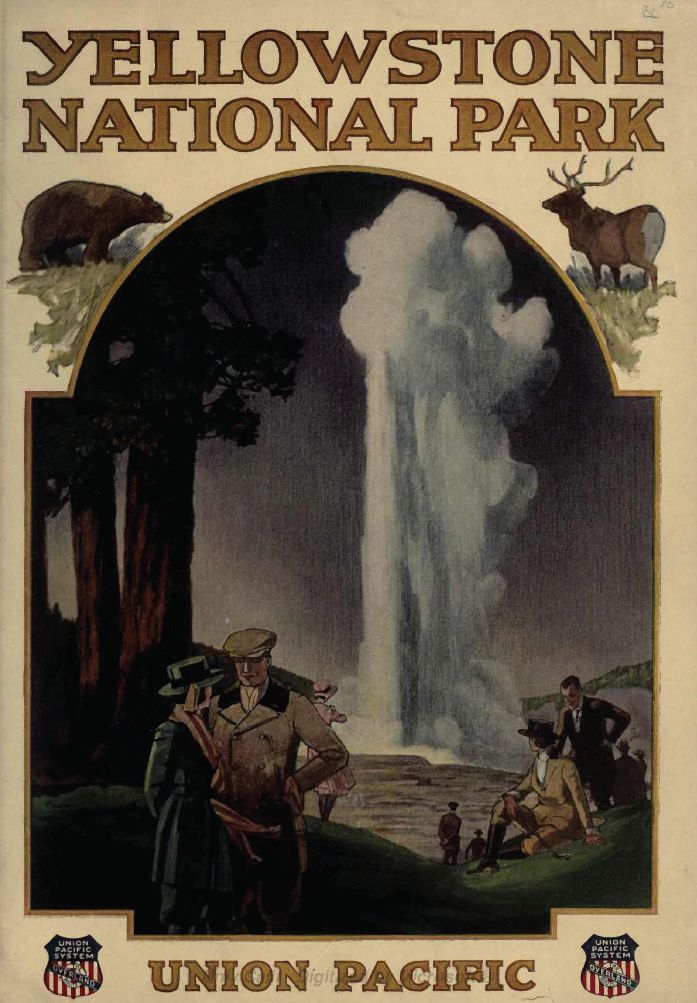

The following articles relate to the history, geography, geology, flora, fauna, structures and recreation in Yellowstone National Park.

== Yellowstone National Park history ==
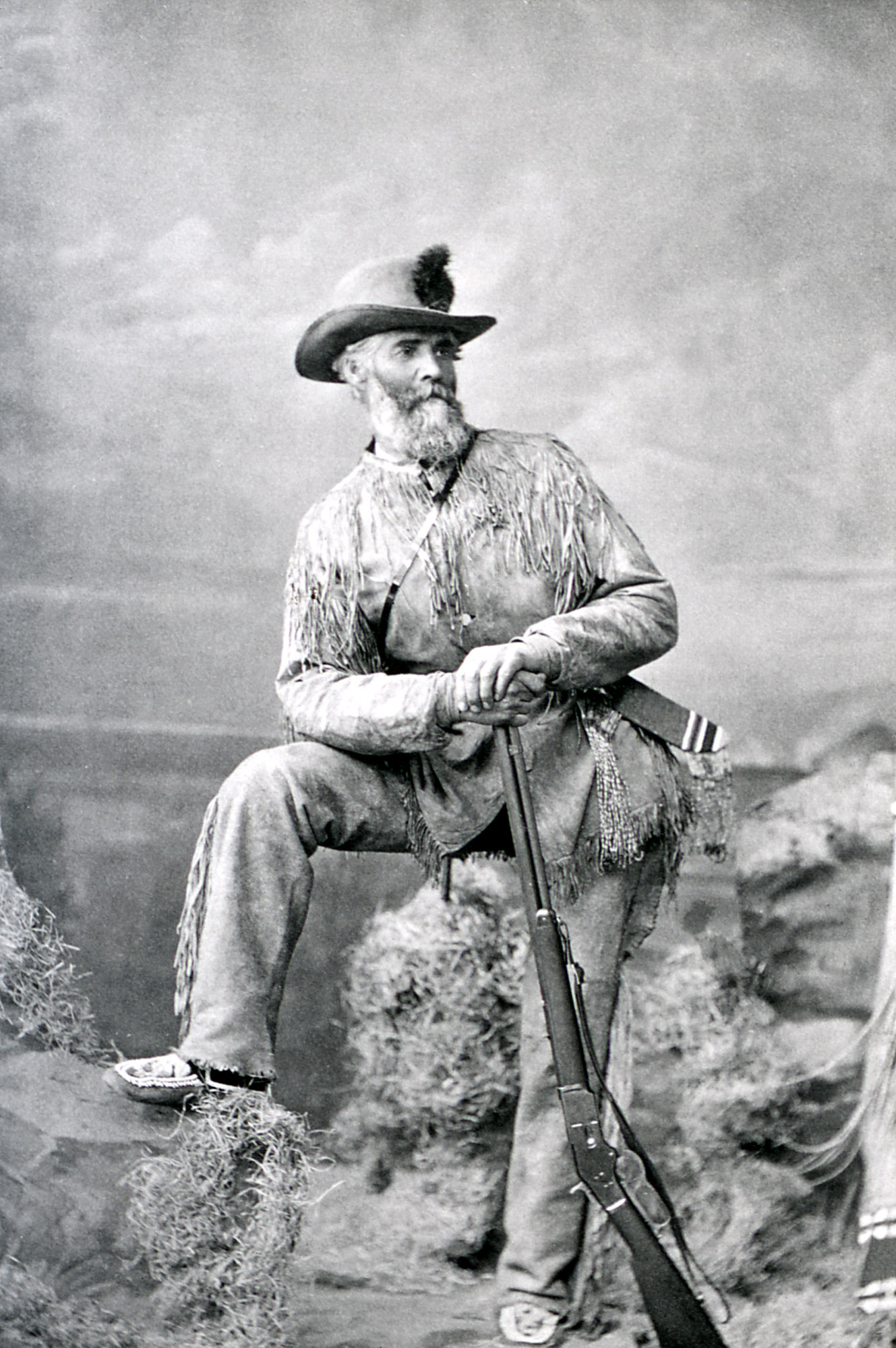
Philetus Norris

Panoramic painting of Yellowstone National Park by Heinrich C. Berann, commissioned by the National Park Service

- Exploration
  - Cook–Folsom–Peterson Expedition – 1869 exploration of Yellowstone river and lake
  - Washburn–Langford–Doane Expedition – 1870 exploration of Yellowstone river, lake and Firehole river basin
    - Fort Ellis – Starting point of the Washburn Expedition
  - Hayden Geological Survey of 1871 – First of five surveys by Hayden in Yellowstone
- Native Americans
  - Nez Perce National Historic Trail – Nez Perce tribe traversed Yellowstone during Nez Perce War of 1877
- People
  - Explorers
    - Robert Adams, Jr. – U.S. Geological Surveys 1871–1875
    - Jim Bridger – Mountain man familiar with Yellowstone region (1856)
    - John Colter – First person of European descent to visit Yellowstone region
    - Lt.Gustavus C. Doane – U.S. Army Cavalry escort during Washburn expedition of 1870
    - Truman C. Everts – former U.S. Assessor for the Montana Territory, member of Washburn Expedition
    - Warren Angus Ferris – Early Yellowstone region trapper
    - Arnold Hague – U.S. Geological Surveys 1880s
    - Ferdinand Vandeveer Hayden – U.S. Geological Surveys 1871–1875
    - Nathaniel P. Langford – Member of Washburn expedition and first park superintendent
    - William F. Raynolds – Early explorer in Yellowstone region
    - Alexander Ross (fur trader) – Early fur trader in Yellowstone region
    - Osborne Russell – Early trapper to visit region and describe the Lamar Valley (1834)
    - Cyrus Thomas – agricultural statistician and entomologist on the 1871 Hayden survey
    - Henry D. Washburn – Leader of Washburn expedition
  - Park superintendents and administrators
    - Horace M. Albright – Park superintendent (1919–1929)
    - Frazier Boutelle – Park superintendent (1889–1890)
    - Harry W. Frantz – Director of publicity 1923 – named Grand Loop Road
    - John W. Meldrum – 1st U.S. Commissioner to Yellowstone (1894–1935)
    - Philetus Norris – Second park superintendent
  - Park rangers
    - Harry Yount – First park ranger
    - Isabel Bassett Wasson – the first female ranger in Yellowstone
  - Engineers and architects
    - Hiram M. Chittenden – U.S. Army Engineer
    - Dan Christie Kingman – U.S. Army Engineer
    - Herbert Maier – Yellowstone architect (1929–31)
    - Robert Reamer – Old Faithful Inn architect
  - Photographers, artists and illustrators
    - Heinrich C. Berann – Panoramic artist
    - Albert Bierstadt – Early Yellowstone artist
    - Frank Jay Haynes – Official park photographer 1884–1921
    - William Henry Jackson – US Geological Survey photographer 1869–1878
    - Thomas Moran – Early Yellowstone artist – guest member of 1871 Hayden Geological Survey
    - Birger Sandzén – Sweden artist
  - Naturalists and scientists
    - Thomas D. Brock – Microbiologist
    - Don G. Despain – Botanist – Yellowstone flora specialist
    - Shaun Ellis (wolf researcher)
    - Henry Gannett – Geographer, member of Hayden Surveys, named Electric Peak
    - George Bird Grinnell – Early naturalist promoting Yellowstone
    - William Henry Holmes – Early geologist documenting Yellowstone geothermal features
    - A. Starker Leopold – author of the 1963 Leopold Report-Wildlife Management in the National Parks
    - Bill McGuire – Volcano researcher
    - L. David Mech – Wolf researcher
    - Adolph Murie – National Park Service Wildlife Biologist – published seminar study on coyotes in Yellowstone (1940)
  - Military
    - John W. Barlow – Explored Yellowstone at same time as 1871 Hayden expedition
    - William W. Belknap – Secretary of War (1869–1876) – Guided by Lt. Gustavus C. Doane on two week visit in 1876 to Yellowstone that followed Washburn route.
    - Chris Madsen – U.S. Army guide – guided U.S. President Chester A. Arthur in Yellowstone (1883)
    - General Philip Sheridan – Early U.S. Army protector of Yellowstone
    - Captain Wilber E. Wilder – Acting Superintendent, March 15, 1899 – June 23, 1899
    - Captain Samuel B. M. Young – Acting Superintendent, June 23, 1897 – November 15, 1897; Full Superintendent as a General, June 1, 1907 – November 28, 1908
  - Politicians
    - William H. Clagett – Montana Territorial Congressman, 1871–1872 – Introduced park creation bill in U.S. House of Representatives on December 18, 1871
    - Henry L. Dawes – Congressman from Massachusetts (1863–1873) – strong supporter of park creation. Chester Dawes, his son was a member of the 1871 Hayden survey and Anna the first boat on Yellowstone Lake was named after his daughter: Anna Dawes
    - William D. Kelley – In 1871, he was the first Washington politician to suggest of what would later become Yellowstone National Park
    - John F. Lacey – Iowa Congressman who sponsored The Lacey Act of 1884 to protect Yellowstone wildlife from poachers.
    - Lucius Quintus Cincinnatus Lamar (II) – Secretary of Interior (March 1885 – January 1888) – Lamar River is named after him.
    - Guy R. Pelton – U.S. congressman who died in Yellowstone (1890)
    - Samuel C. Pomeroy – Kansas Senator, 1861–1873 – Introduced park creation bill into U.S. Senate on December 18, 1871
    - Lyman Trumbull – Senator from Illinois who supported Yellowstone creation act – Father of Walter Trumbull, a member of the Washburn Party
    - George Graham Vest – Senator from Missouri (1879–1903) – Self-appointed protector of Yellowstone
  - Promoters
    - Jay Cooke – Northern Pacific Railroad – Financed Nathaniel P. Langford's 1871 lectures on Yellowstone exploration
    - Howard Eaton – Prolific tour operator and publicist, for whom the Howard Eaton Trail was named
- Historic events
  - Expeditions and the protection of Yellowstone (1869–1890)
  - Nez Perce in Yellowstone Park
  - History of the National Park Service
  - 1959 Hebgen Lake earthquake
  - Mission 66 – National Park Service ten-year program to prepare parks for 1966 50th Anniversary
  - Teton–Yellowstone tornado – F4 tornado – July 21, 1987
  - Yellowstone fires of 1988
- Advocates
  - Greater Yellowstone Coalition
  - Yellowstone to Yukon Conservation Initiative
- Concessionaires
  - Harry W. Child – Assembled and operated the Yellowstone Park Company
  - Hamilton's Stores (Yellowstone National Park)
  - John F. Yancey – operated Yancey's Pleasant Valley Hotel, 1884–1903
  - Xanterra Parks and Resorts

== Geography ==
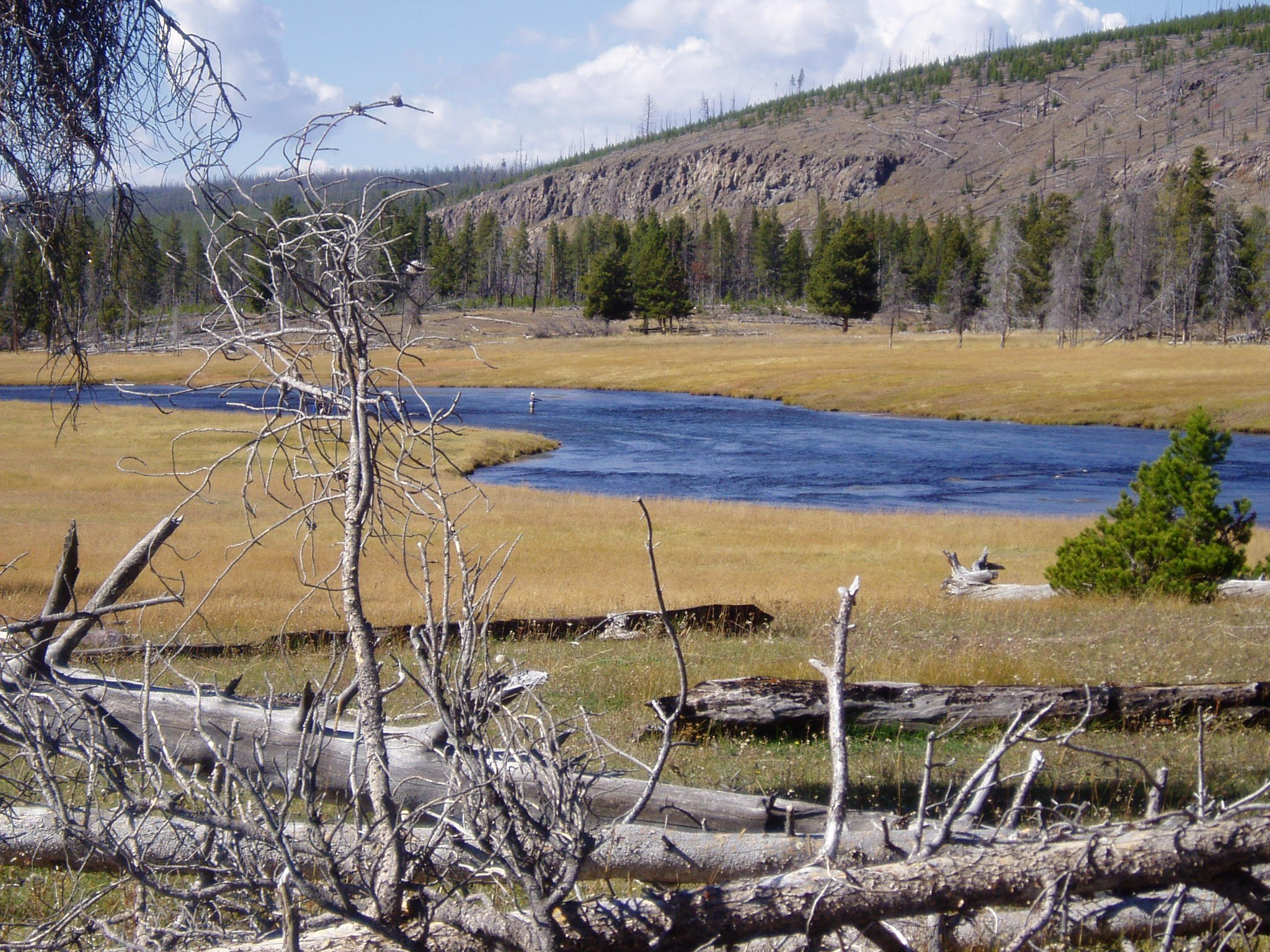
Firehole river at Fountain Flats

- Rivers
  - Bechler River
  - Crawfish Creek
  - Fall River
  - Firehole River
  - Gallatin River
  - Gardner River
  - Gibbon River
  - Grand Canyon of the Yellowstone
  - Heart River
  - Lamar River
  - Lewis River
  - Madison River
  - Slough Creek
  - Snake River
  - Yellowstone River
- Lakes
  - Grebe Lake
  - Heart Lake
  - Isa Lake
  - Lewis Lake
  - Shoshone Lake
  - Trout Lake
  - Wrangler Lake
  - Yellowstone Lake
- Mountains
  - Abiathar Peak
  - Absaroka Range
  - Antler Peak
  - Barronette Peak
  - Bunsen Peak
  - Clagett Butte
  - Colter Peak
  - Cook Peak
  - Douglas Knob
  - Druid Peak
  - Dunraven Peak
  - Eagle Peak (Wyoming)
  - Electric Peak
  - Folsom Peak
  - Gallatin Range
  - Gray Peak (Wyoming)
  - Hedges Peak
  - Mount Chittenden
  - Mount Doane
  - Mount Everts
  - Mount Hancock
  - Mount Haynes
  - Mount Holmes
  - Mount Hornaday
  - Mount Jackson
  - Mount Norris
  - Mount Schurz
  - Mount Sheridan
  - Mount Stevenson
  - Mount Washburn
  - National Park Mountain
  - Prospect Peak
  - Specimen Ridge
  - Terrace Mountain
  - The Thunderer
  - Trischman Knob
  - Younts Peak
- Waterfalls
  - Bechler Falls
  - Firehole Falls
  - Iris Falls
  - Kepler Cascades
  - Lewis Falls
  - Moose Falls
  - Mystic Falls
  - Tower Fall
  - Terraced Falls
  - Union Falls
  - Virginia Cascades
  - Yellowstone Falls
- Roads and passes
  - Beartooth Highway
  - Buffalo Bill Cody Scenic Byway
  - Craig Pass
  - Dunraven Pass
  - Golden Gate Canyon
  - Grand Loop Road
  - Kingman Pass
  - Sylvan Pass (Wyoming)
  - Yellowstone Trail
  - John D. Rockefeller, Jr. Memorial Parkway

== Geology ==
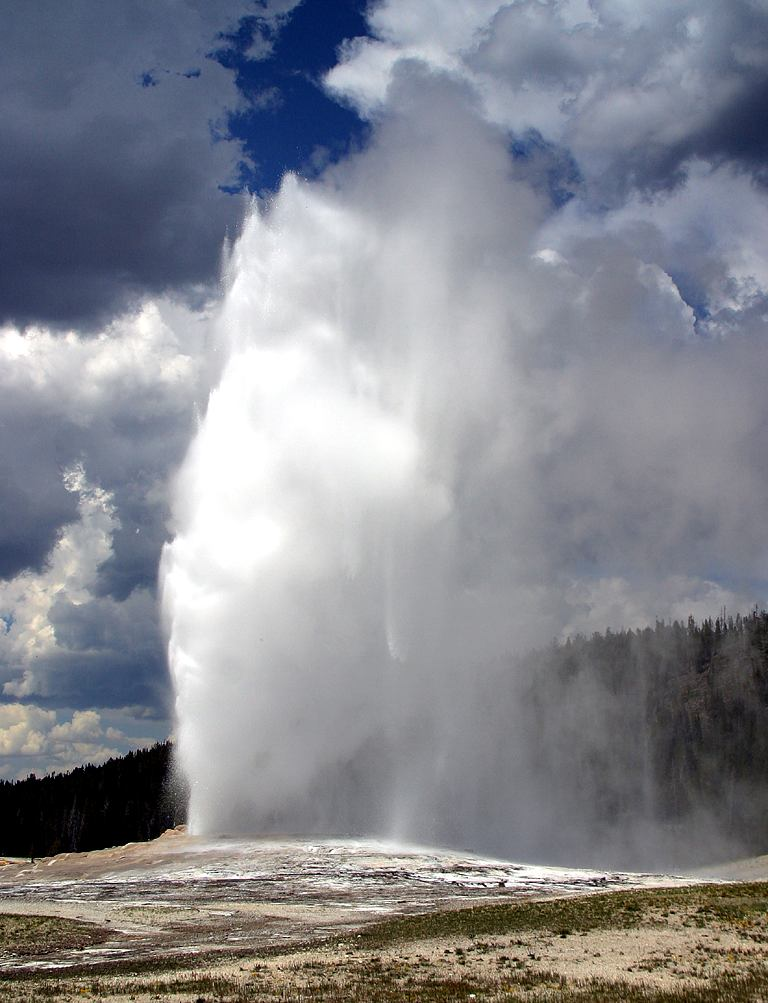
Old Faithful in Upper Geyser Basin

- Geysers and thermal features
  - Yellowstone Caldera
  - Yellowstone Plateau
  - Yellowstone hotspot
  - List of Yellowstone geothermal features
  - Lone Star Geyser Basin
    - Lone Star Geyser
  - Lower Geyser Basin
    - A-0 Geyser
    - Artesia Geyser
    - Azure Spring
    - Bead Geyser
    - Botryoidal Spring
    - Box Spring
    - Clepsydra Geyser
    - Dilemma Geyser
    - Fountain Geyser
    - Great Fountain Geyser
    - Jet Geyser
    - Labial Geyser
    - Morning Geyser
    - Narcissus Geyser
    - Ojo Caliente Spring
    - Pink Cone Geyser
    - Pink Geyser
    - Spindle Geyser
    - White Dome Geyser
    - Young Hopeful Geyser
  - Midway Geyser Basin
    - Excelsior Geyser
    - Fountain Paint Pots
    - Grand Prismatic Spring
    - Opal Pool
    - Turquoise Pool
  - Upper Geyser Basin
    - Anemone Geyser
    - Artemisia Geyser
    - Atomizer Geyser
    - Aurum Geyser
    - Baby Daisy Geyser
    - Beauty Pool
    - Beehive Geyser
    - Big Cub Geyser
    - Bijou Geyser
    - Brilliant Pool
    - Castle Geyser
    - Chromatic Spring
    - Comet Geyser
    - Crested Pool
    - Daisy Geyser
    - Doublet Pool
    - Economic Geyser Crater
    - Fan and Mortar Geysers
    - Giant Geyser
    - Giantess Geyser
    - Grand Geyser
    - Grotto Geyser
    - Lion Geyser
    - Morning Glory Pool
    - Old Faithful Geyser
    - Pump Geyser
    - Riverside Geyser
    - Solitary Geyser
    - Spasmodic Geyser
    - Splendid Geyser
    - Turban Geyser
    - Vent Geyser
  - West Thumb Geyser Basin
    - Abyss Pool
    - Big Cone
    - Black Pool
    - Fishing Cone
  - Norris Geyser Basin
    - Big Alcove Spring
    - Echinus Geyser
    - Emerald Spring
    - Steamboat Geyser
  - Gibbon Geyser Basin
    - Beryl Spring
  - Mammoth Hot Springs
    - Mammoth Hot Springs
  - Yellowstone River
    - Sulphur Spring
- Geologic formations
  - Huckleberry Ridge Tuff
  - Inspiration Point
  - Lava Creek Tuff
  - Mesa Falls Tuff
  - Obsidian Cliff
  - Overhanging Cliff
  - Sheepeater Cliff

== Flora ==
- Thermus aquaticus
- Hadesarchaea

== Fauna ==
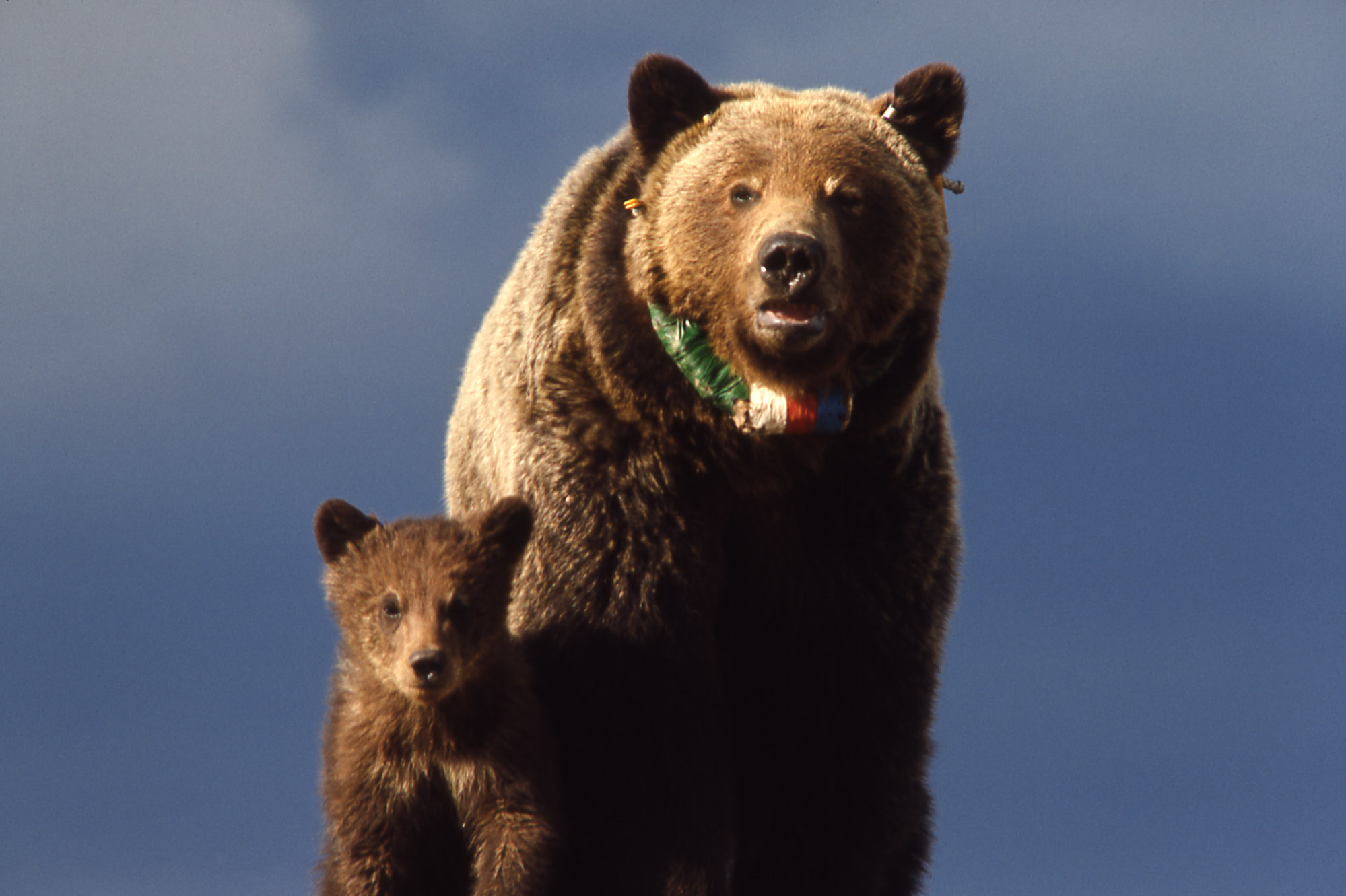
Yellowstone grizzly

- American bison
- Amphibians and reptiles of Yellowstone National Park
- Animals of Yellowstone
- Bighorn sheep
- Birds of Yellowstone National Park
- Grizzly bear
- Elk
- Fishes of Yellowstone National Park
- Gray wolf
- Greater Yellowstone Ecosystem
- History of wolves in Yellowstone
- Leopold Report – Seminal 1963 study: "Wildlife Management in the National Parks"
- Pronghorn
- Small mammals of Yellowstone National Park
- Wolf reintroduction
- Yellowstone cutthroat trout
- Yellowstone Park bison herd

== Districts and structures ==
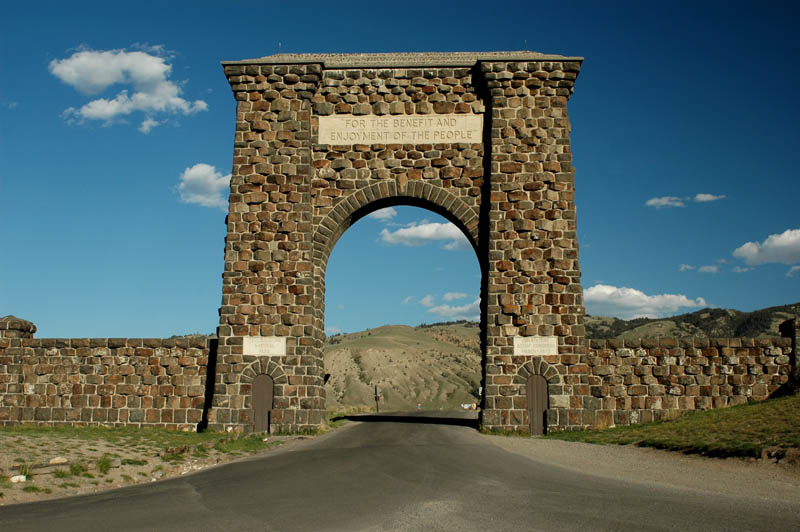
Roosevelt Arch

- National Register of Historic Places listings in Yellowstone National Park
- Districts
  - Firehole Village
  - Fort Yellowstone
  - Grand Loop Road Historic District
  - Grant Village
  - Lake Fish Hatchery Historic District
  - Mammoth Hot Springs Historic District
  - North Entrance Road Historic District
  - Roosevelt Lodge Historic District
  - Old Faithful Historic District
  - Yanceys, Wyoming
- Structures
  - Canyon Hotel
  - Hotels and Tourist Camps of Yellowstone National Park
  - Fishing Bridge Museum
  - Lake Hotel
  - Lamar Buffalo Ranch
  - Madison Museum
  - Marshall's Hotel
  - Norris Geyser Basin Museum
  - Norris, Madison, and Fishing Bridge Museums
  - Northeast Entrance Station
  - Obsidian Cliff Kiosk
  - Old Faithful Inn
  - Old Faithful Lodge
  - Old Faithful Museum of Thermal Activity
  - Queen's Laundry Bath House
  - Roosevelt Arch
  - U.S. Post Office (Yellowstone National Park)
  - Yellowstone National Park School a.k.a. Mammoth School (now the Mammoth Community Center)

== Recreation ==
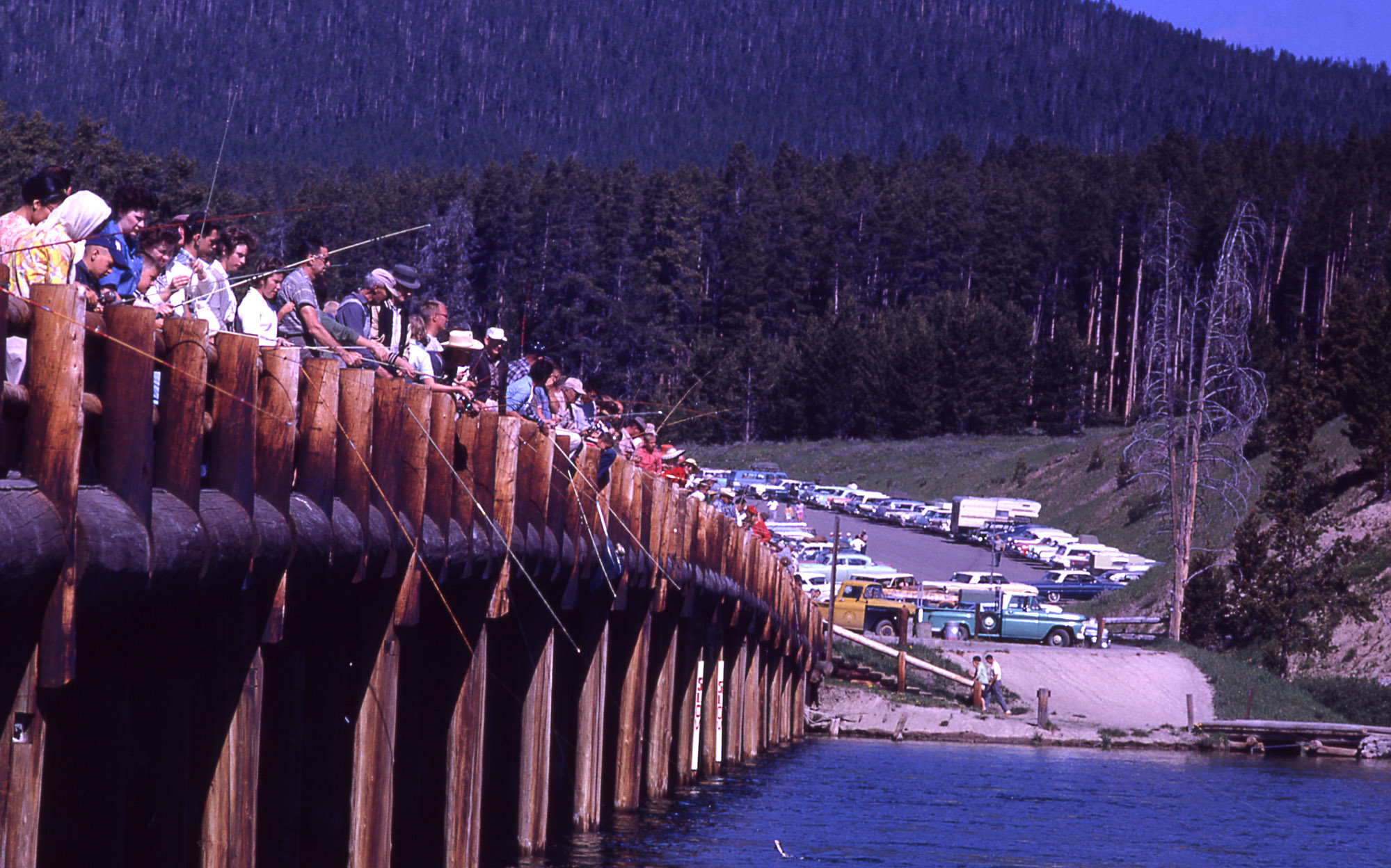
Fishing Bridge

- Angling in Yellowstone National Park
- Trails of Yellowstone National Park
  - Continental Divide Trail – Traverses southwest corner of the park

== Media coverage ==
- Yellowstone (UK TV series)

== Trivia ==
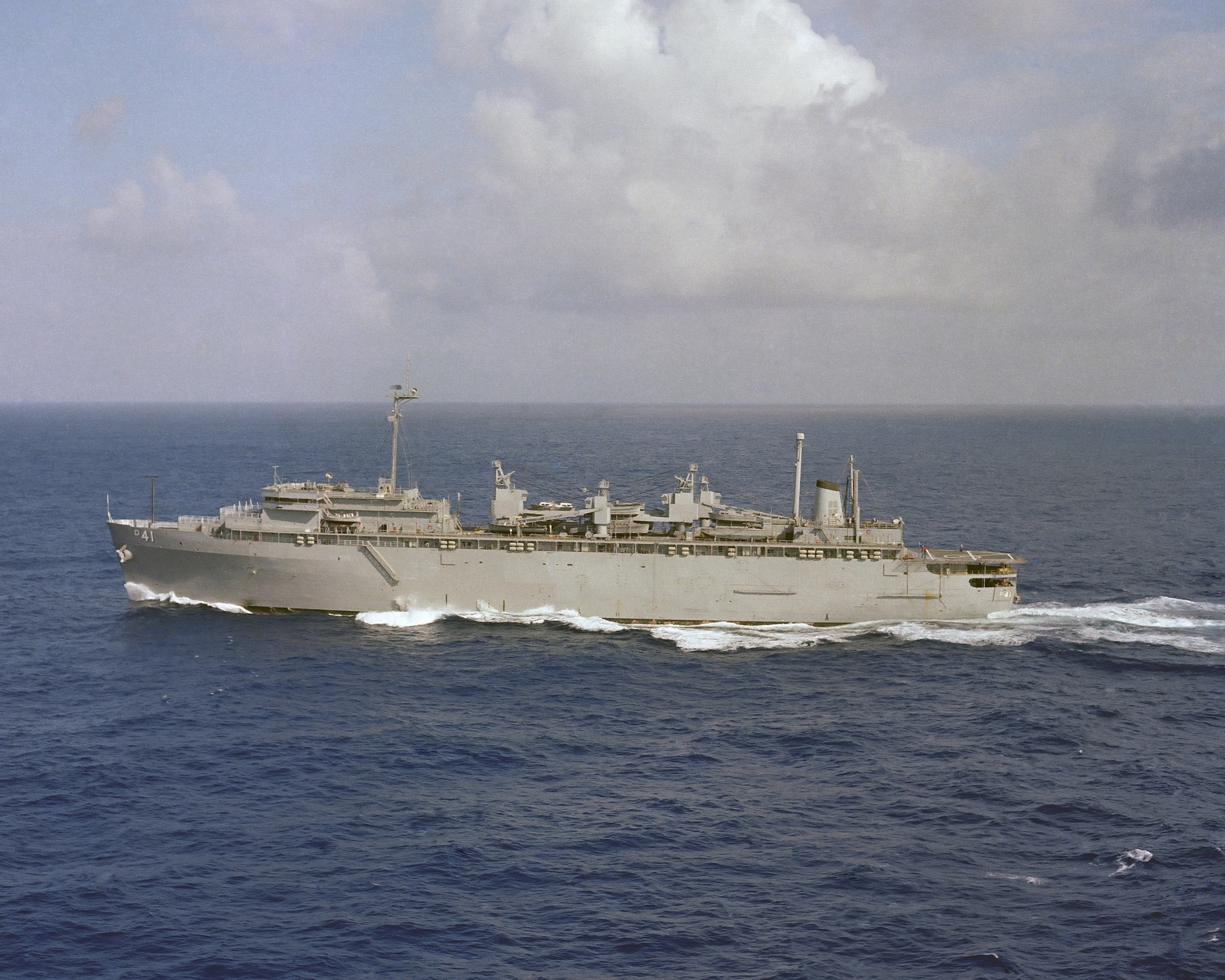
USS Yellowstone, AD-41

- J. Audubon Woodlore – Fictional Disney ranger from Brownstone Park (a parody of Yellowstone)
- Salvatore Vasapolli – Photographic artist that produces Yellowstone calendars
- Supervolcano (docudrama) – 2005 BBC/Discovery Channel docudrama centered on the fictional eruption of the volcanic caldera of Yellowstone National Park
- USS Yellowstone (AD-27) – Shenandoah-class destroyer tender named for Yellowstone National Park (1945)
- USS Yellowstone (AD-41) – Yellowstone-class destroyer tender (1979)
- Yellowstone (film) – 1936 Murder mystery staged in Yellowstone
- Yellowstone Trail – Early transcontinental highway project
- Yellowstone: The Music of Nature – Yellowstone inspired music by Mannheim Steamroller (1989).
- Boeing Yellowstone Project – a project to replace its entire civil aircraft portfolio with advanced technology aircraft.

== Entrance communities ==
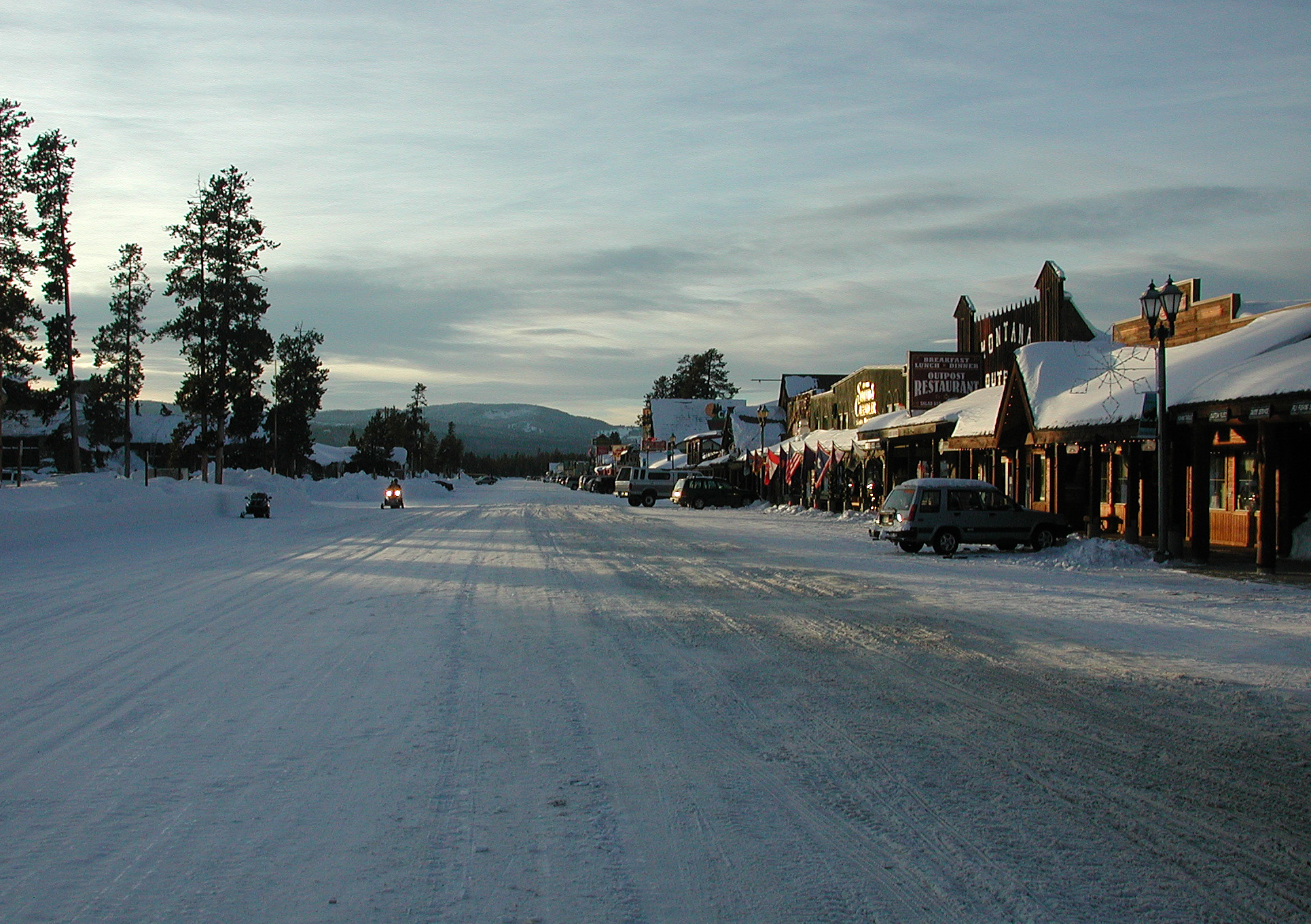
West Yellowstone

- Montana
  - Gardiner, Montana
  - Cooke City-Silver Gate
  - Livingston, Montana
  - West Yellowstone, Montana
  - Yellowstone Airport – Located in West Yellowstone, Montana
  - Yellowstone National Park (part), Montana
- Wyoming
  - Cody, Wyoming
  - Yellowstone Regional Airport – Located in Cody, Wyoming
  - Jackson, Wyoming
  - Jackson Hole Airport
- Highways
  - John D. Rockefeller, Jr. Memorial Parkway – Connects Grand Teton National Park and Yellowstone
  - U.S. Route 14 – Eastern entrance 44°29′18.42″N 110°00′13.8″W
  - U.S. Route 20 – Western entrance, Eastern entrance
  - U.S. Route 89 – Northern entrance, Southern entrance
  - U.S. Route 191 – Western entrance, Southern entrance
  - U.S. Route 212 – Northeast entrance
  - U.S. Route 287 – Western entrance, Southern entrance

== See also ==
- Bibliography of Yellowstone National Park
