= Pump Geyser =

Geyser in Yellowstone National Park, Wyoming

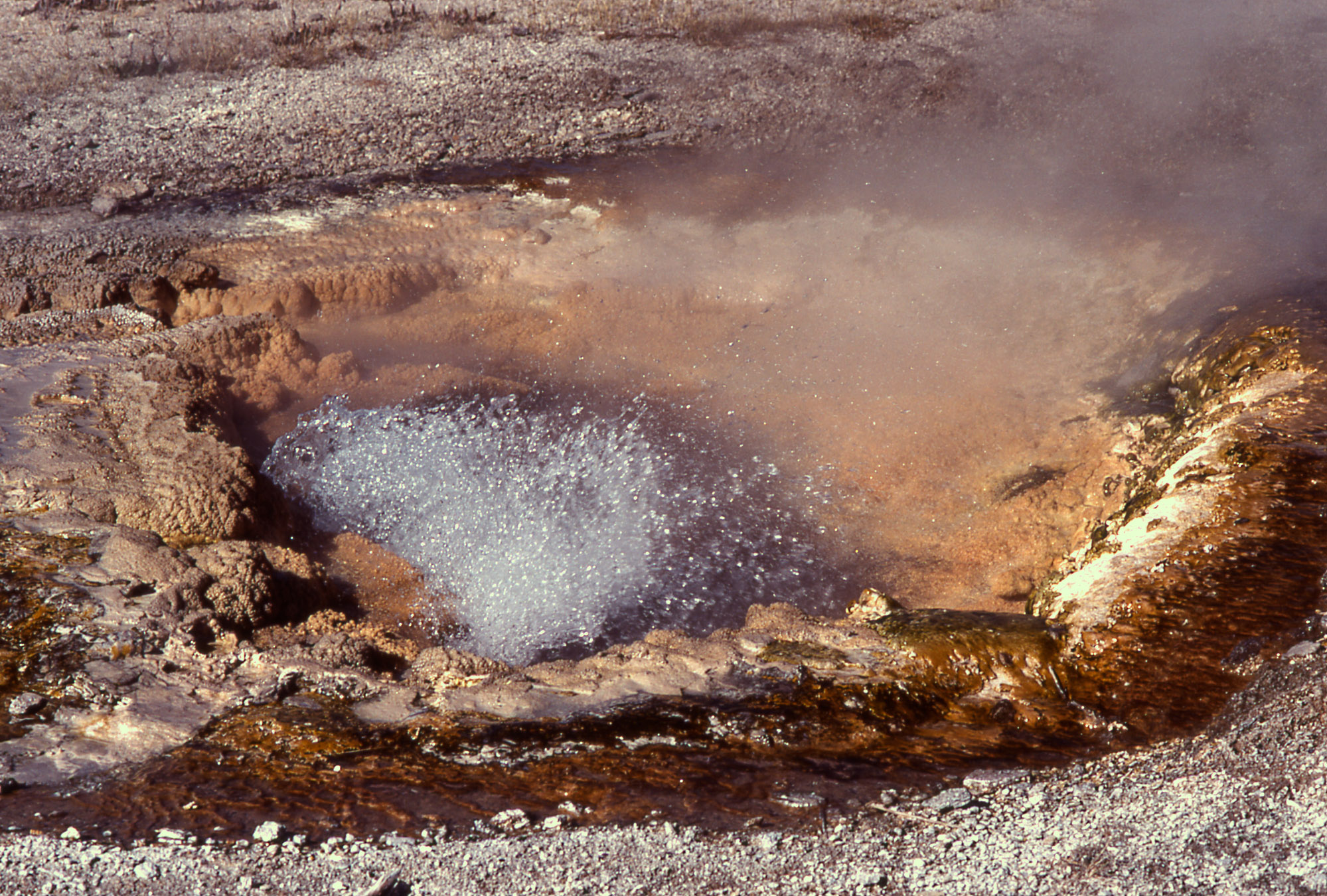
- Pump geyser
- Interactive map of Pump Geyser
- Name origin: Named by Frank Jay Haynes, official park photographer (1883-1916)
- Location: Upper Geyser Basin, Yellowstone National Park, Teton County, Wyoming
- Coordinates: 44.4637787°N 110.8294868°W
- Elevation: 7,369 feet (2,246 m)
- Type: Cone-type geyser
- Eruption height: 2–15 ft (0.61–4.57 m)
- Frequency: Near constant
- Duration: Near constant
- Discharge: Small
- Temperature: 86.1 °C (187.0 °F)
- Depth: a ~2ft deep crater, with a vent inside.

Pump Geyser is a cone geyser located in the Upper Geyser Basin of Yellowstone National Park. It is in the Geyser Hill Complex which includes Aurum Geyser, Beehive Geyser, Big Cub Geyser. Doublet Pool, Giantess Geyser and Lion Geyser, among others.

Pump Geyser erupts almost constantly making splashes 2 to 3 feet high, and thumps without an apparent interval, though there are less productive periods. Then, in 1990, Pump became a true geyser, with intervals and durations of a few seconds. A small boil builds up to a heavy doming of the water which triggers bursting eruptions that spray water up to 15 feet high. After a few seconds of this, the activity dies down to a mere simmer, but, after a pause of a few seconds, the cycle starts anew.

It was most likely named by Frank Jay Haynes, the park photographer from 1883 to 1916. It gets its name because its constant eruptions make a sound similar to that of old style mechanical pump. It may have also been confused for a different geyser called the Pump, when the other one went extinct.

Pump Geyser could have a connection with Sponge Geyser, but it has not been proven. While Sponge fills up, Pump is strangely quiet. Then, when Sponge drains, after a few seconds, Pump begins spurting again. Although a connection is very likely, it has not been further studied.

== Gallery ==
Images of Old Faithful Geyser
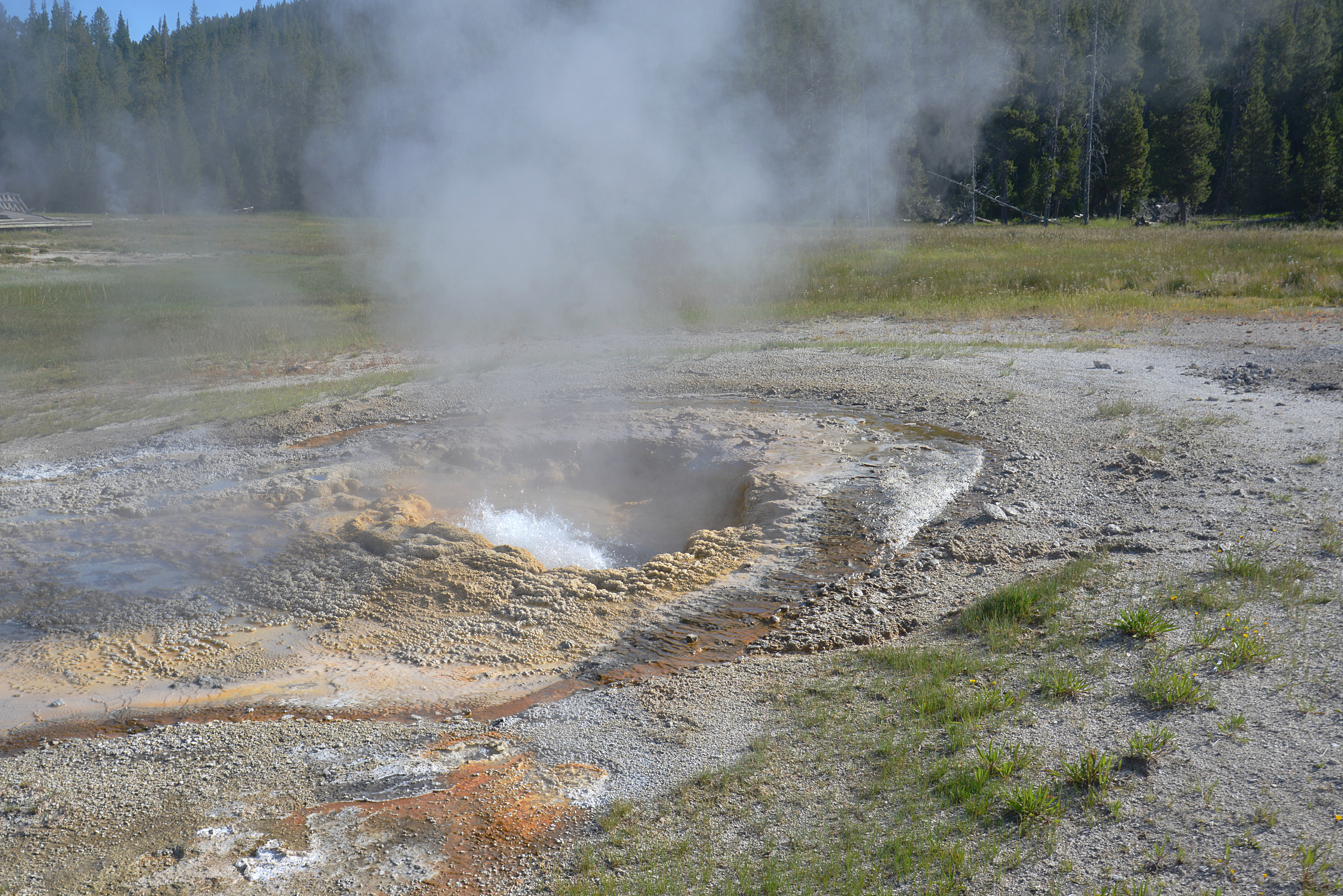
Pump Geyser area

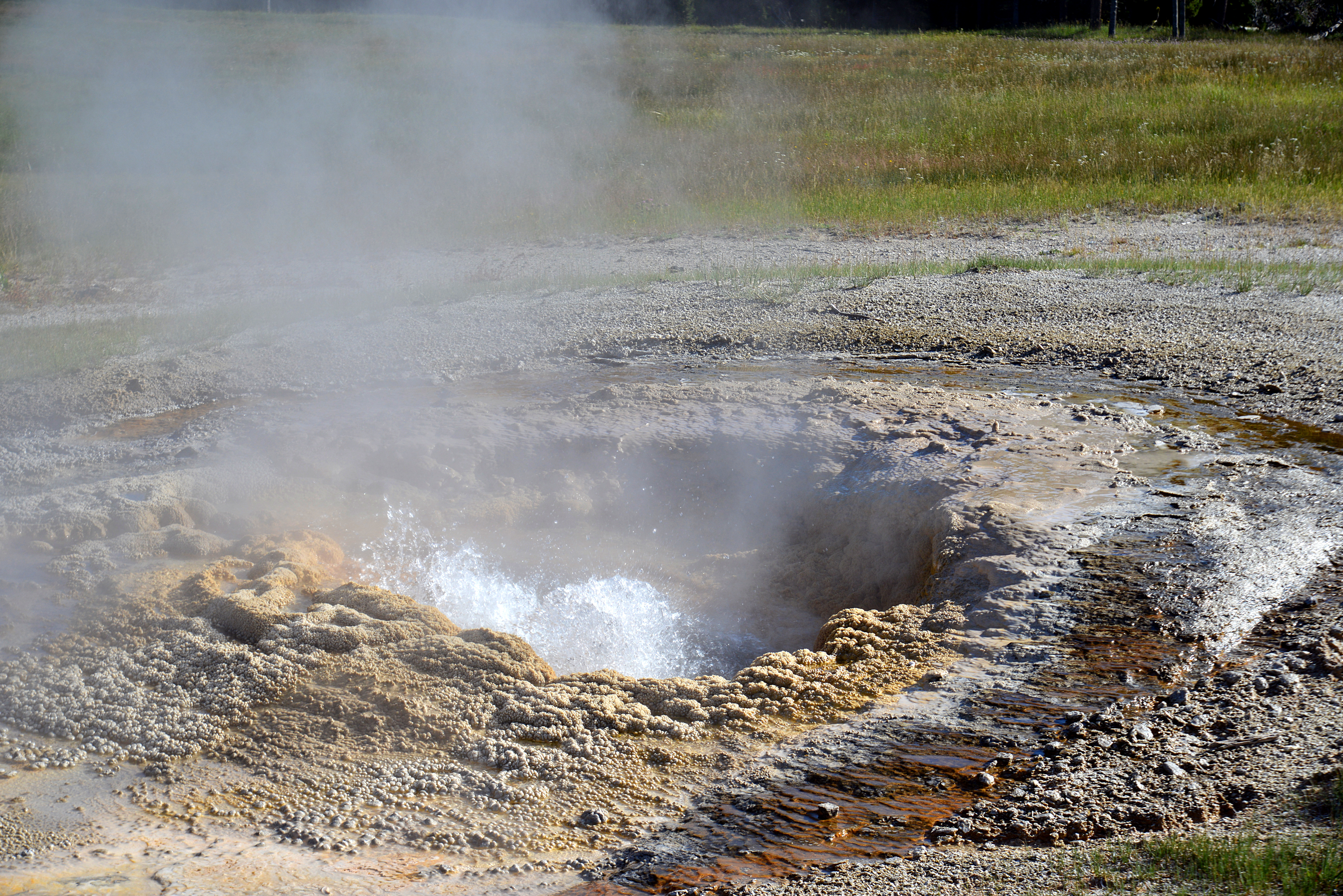
Pump Geyser close-up

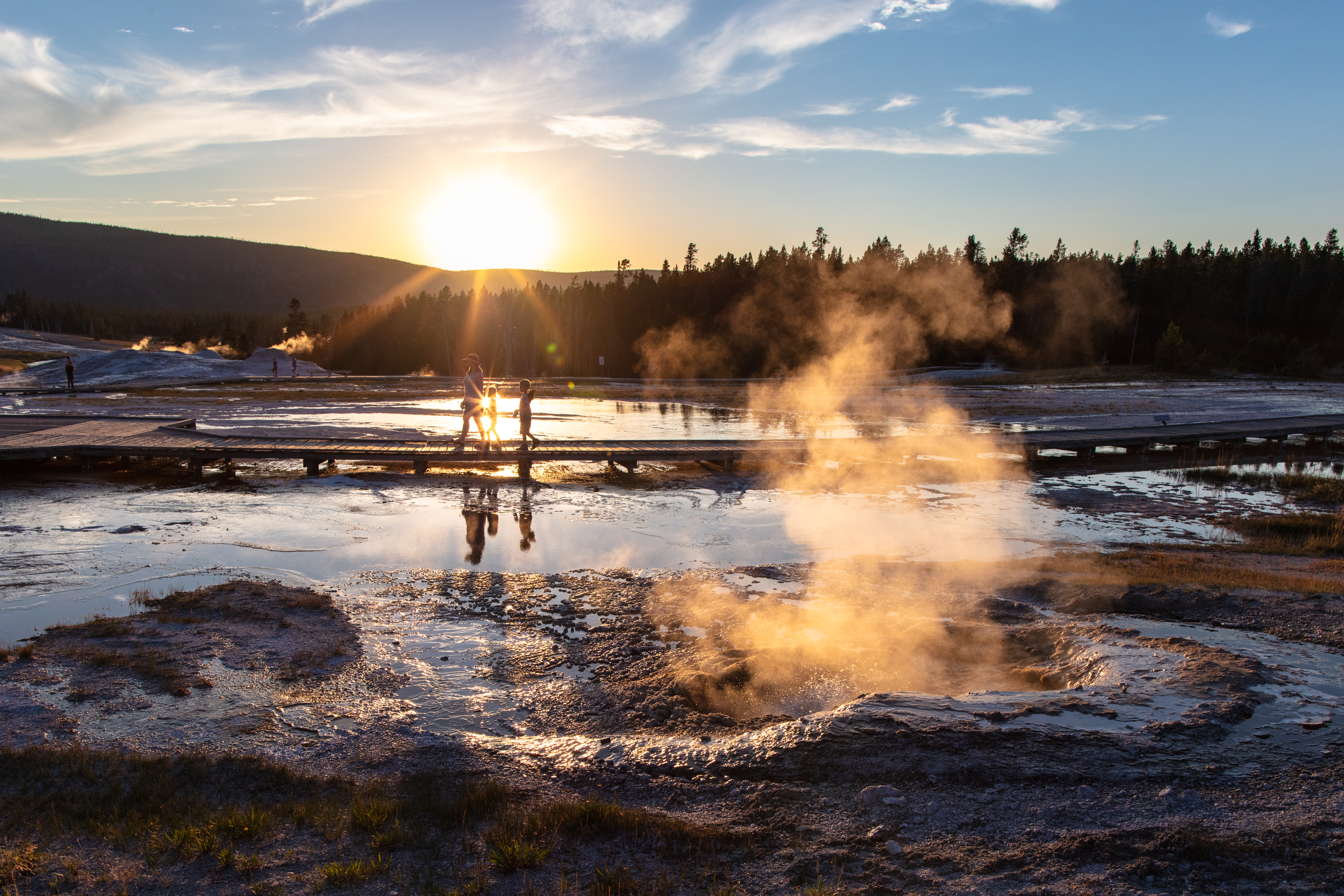
Sunset near Pump Geyser

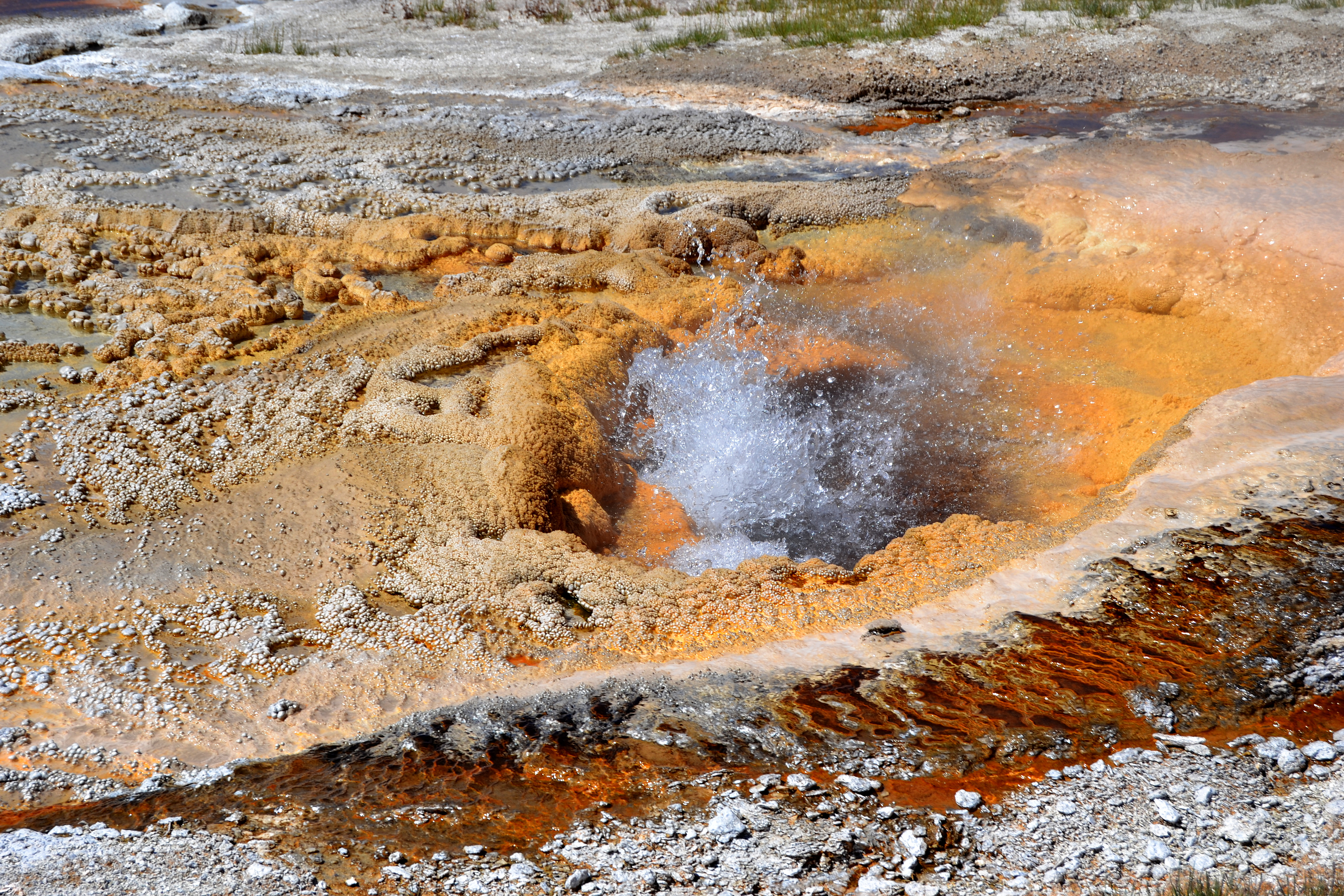
Pump Geyser
