= Big Cub Geyser =

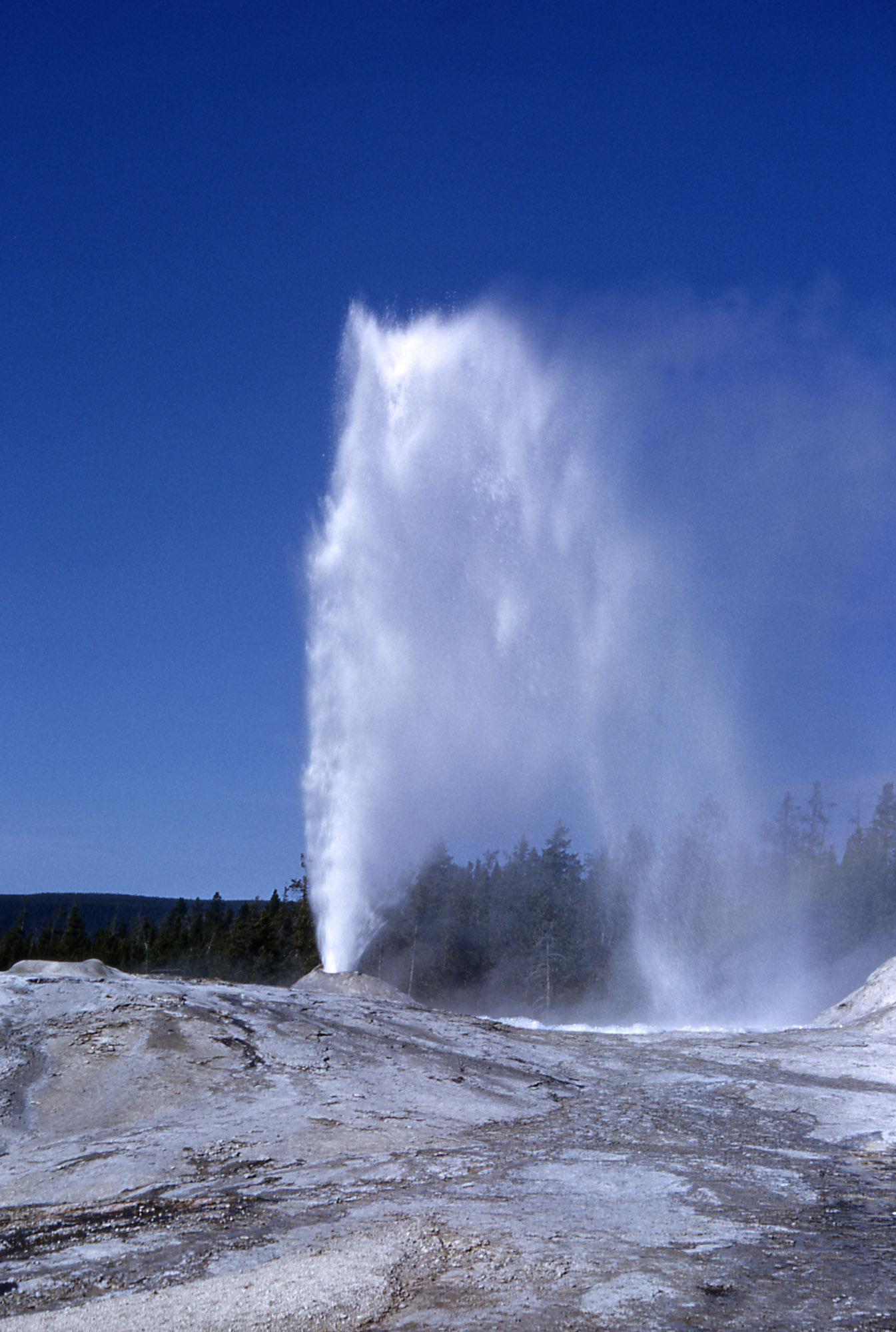
- Big Cub Geyser during an eruption.
- Interactive map of Big Cub Geyser
- Location: Upper Geyser Basin, Yellowstone National Park, Teton County, Wyoming
- Coordinates: 44°27′50″N 110°49′52″W
- Elevation: 7,405 feet (2,257 m)
- Type: Cone geyser
- Temperature: 91.5 °C (196.7 °F)

Big Cub Geyser is a geyser in the Upper Geyser Basin of Yellowstone National Park in the United States.

Big Cub is part of the Lion's Group of geysers, a cluster of geysers that all share an underground connection. The other geysers in this group are Lion Geyser, Lioness Geyser, and Little Cub Geyser.
