= Pink Cone Geyser =

Geyser in the Lower Geyser Basin of Yellowstone National Park

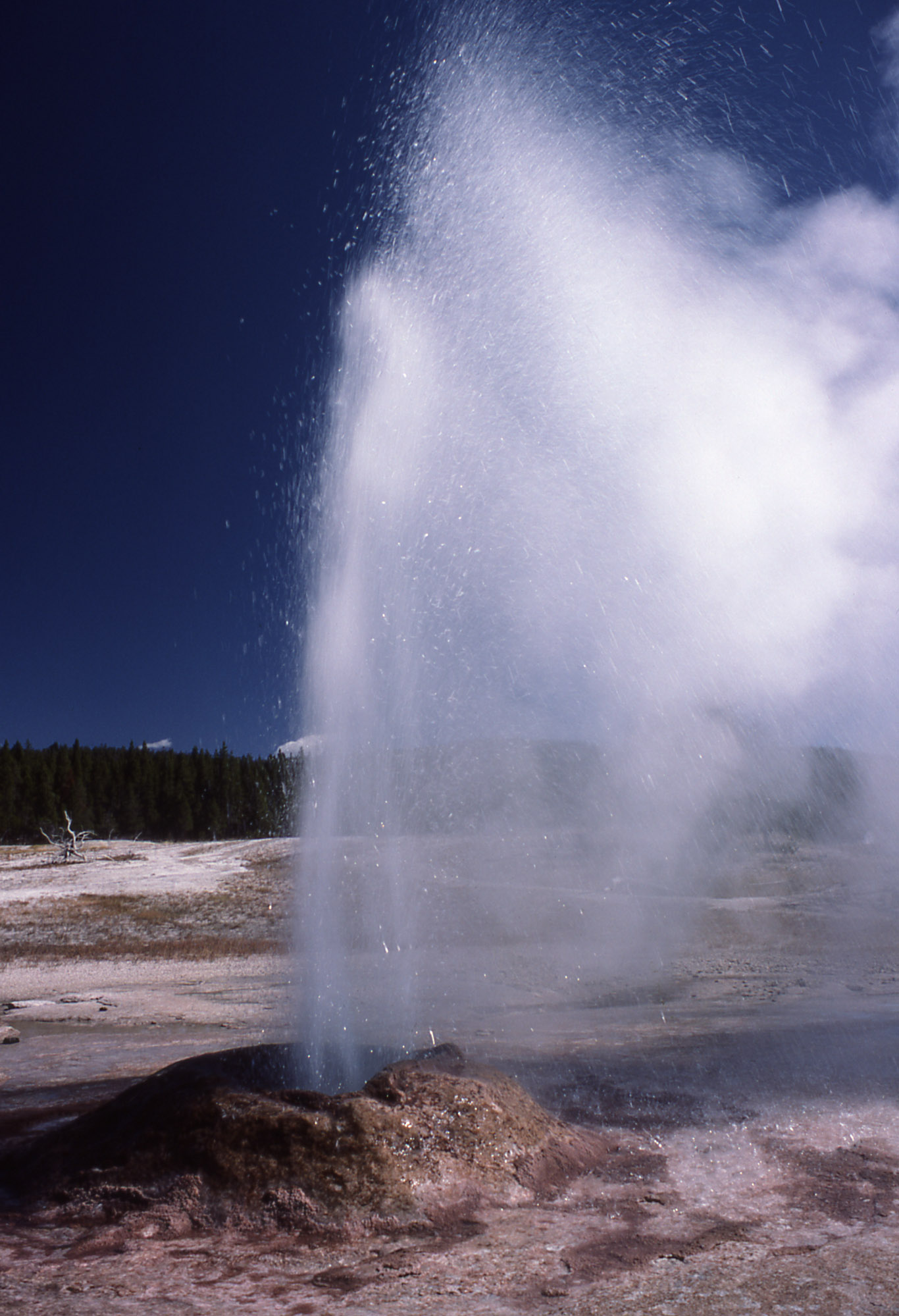
- Pink Cone Geyser eruption
- Interactive map of Pink Cone Geyser
- Location: Lower Geyser Basin, Yellowstone National Park, Teton County, Wyoming
- Coordinates: 44.5428865°N 110.7962493°W
- Type: Cone geyser
- Eruption height: 30 feet (9.1 m)
- Frequency: 9 to 22 hours
- Duration: 1.5 to 2 hours
- Temperature: 91.3 °C (196.3 °F)

Pink Cone Geyser is a cone-type geyser in the Lower Geyser Basin of Yellowstone National Park in the United States. It is part of the Pink Cone Group. Other geysers in this groups include Bead Geyser, Box Spring, Dilemma Geyser, Labial Geyser, Labial's Satellite Geyser, Narcissus Geyser, and Pink Geyser.

Eruptions last 1.5 to 2 hours with a maximum height of 30 feet (9.1 m) high. The interval between eruptions is 18 to 25 hours.

== History ==
Pink Cone Geyser was named by the Hayden Survey. The geyser's siliceous sinter cone is a dark pinkish-red attributed to manganese oxide and iron oxide staining. Similar coloration occurs at some nearby geysers, including Pink Geyser and Narcissus Geyser. This indicates a common water chemistry, but their behaviors do not affect each other.

Pink Cone Geyser photos
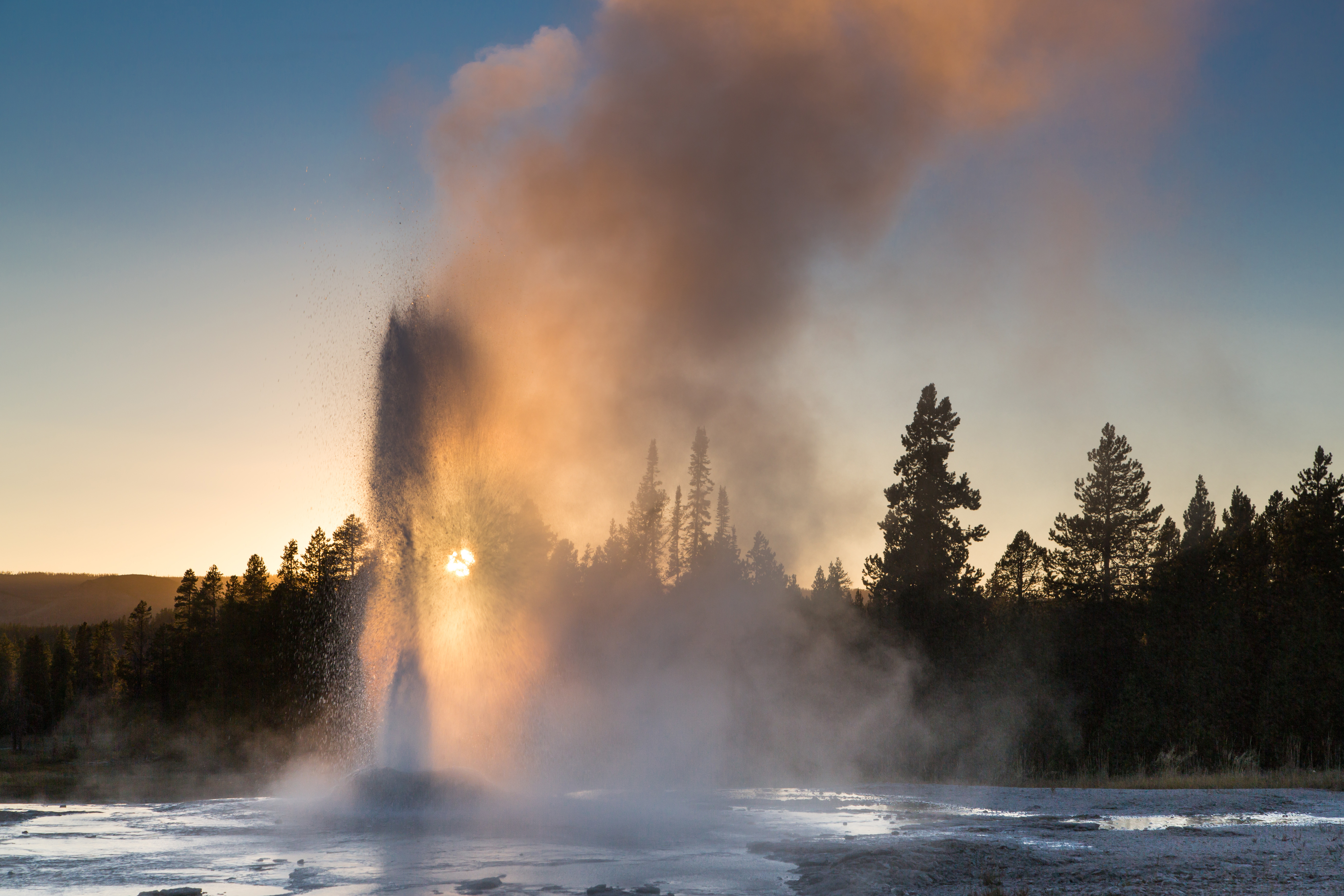
At sunset

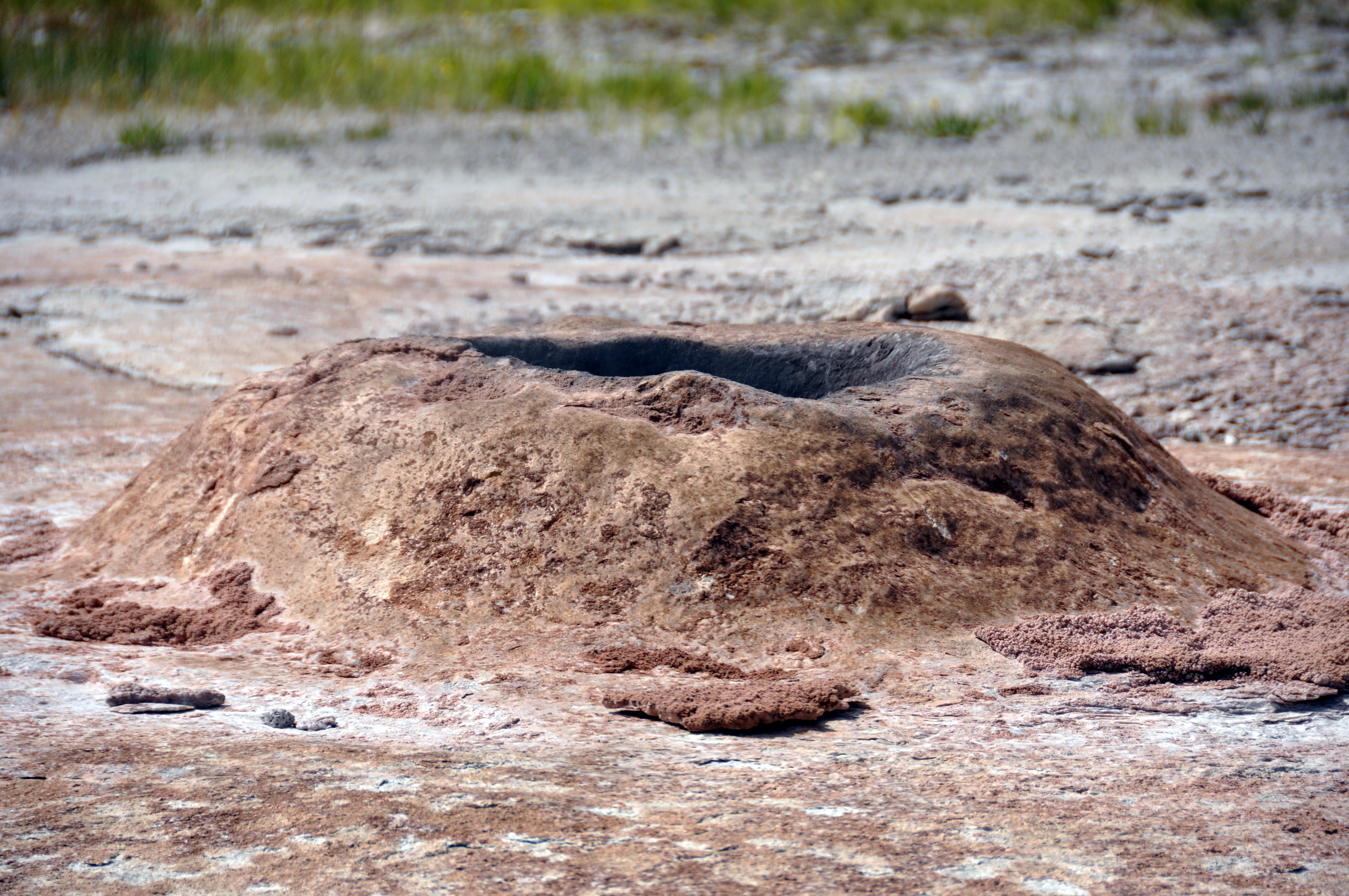
2014

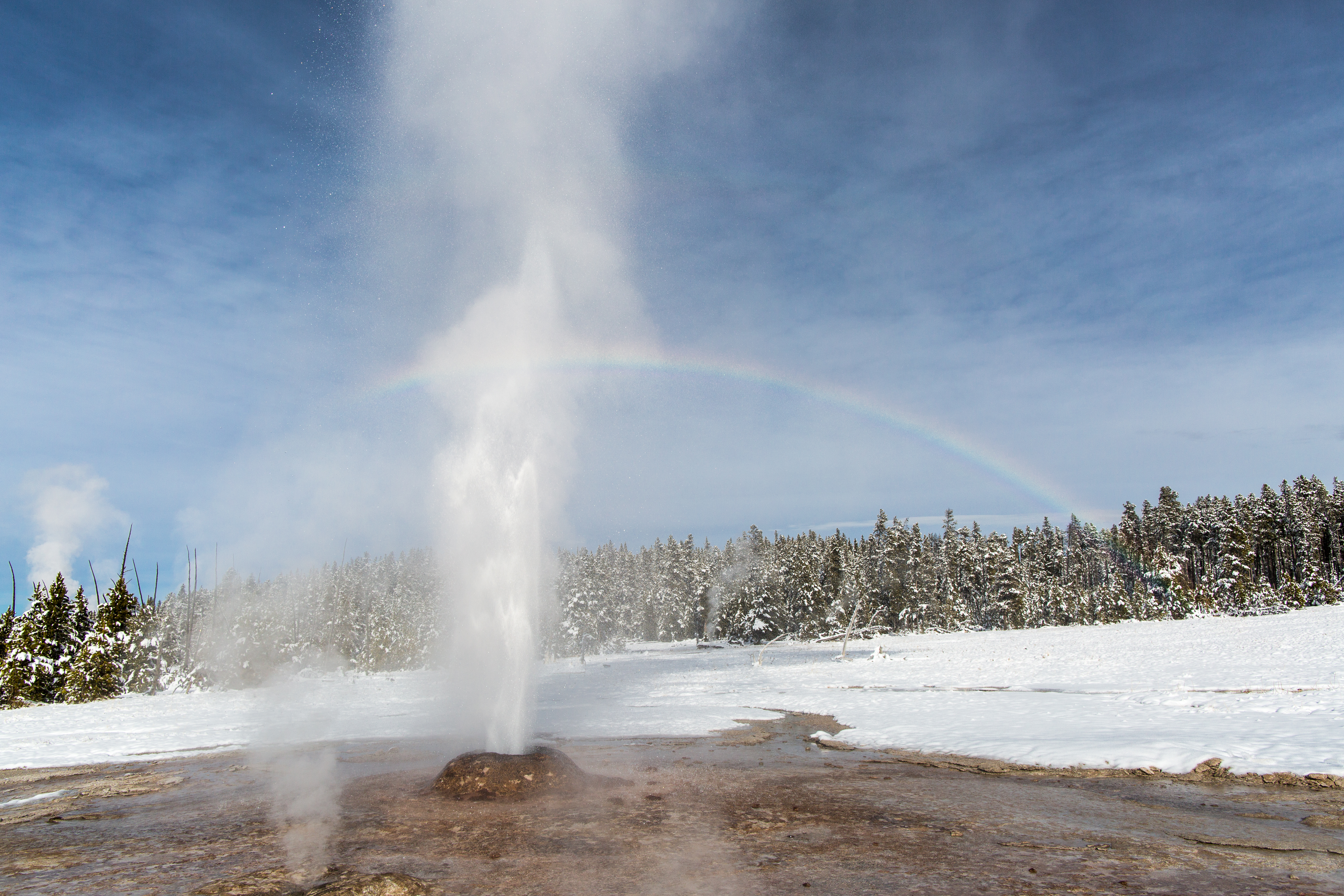
In the winter
