= Box Spring =

- Interactive map of Box Spring
- Location: Lower Geyser Basin, Yellowstone National Park, Teton County, Wyoming
- Coordinates: 44°32′36″N 110°47′43″W
- Temperature: 83.2 °C (181.8 °F)

Box Spring is a geyser in the Lower Geyser Basin of Yellowstone National Park in the United States.

Box Spring is part of the Pink Cone Group. Other geysers in this groups are Bead Geyser, Dilemma Geyser, Labial Geyser, Labial's Satellite Geyser, Narcissus Geyser, Pink Geyser, and Pink Cone Geyser. Eruptions of Box Spring vary in duration from a few seconds to about 3 minutes. Eruption heights range from low to 10 to 15 feet (3.0 to 4.6 m) high. Intervals (duration between the starting of two eruptions) are erratic, and range from about 10 to 90 minutes.

As its name indicates, Box Spring was a hot spring until the 1983 Borah Peak earthquake triggered activity in the spring and it began erupting. It was later discovered that Box Spring was recorded as being active in the 1870s.

== See also ==
- Box Springs Mountain
