= Overhanging Cliff =

- Cliff
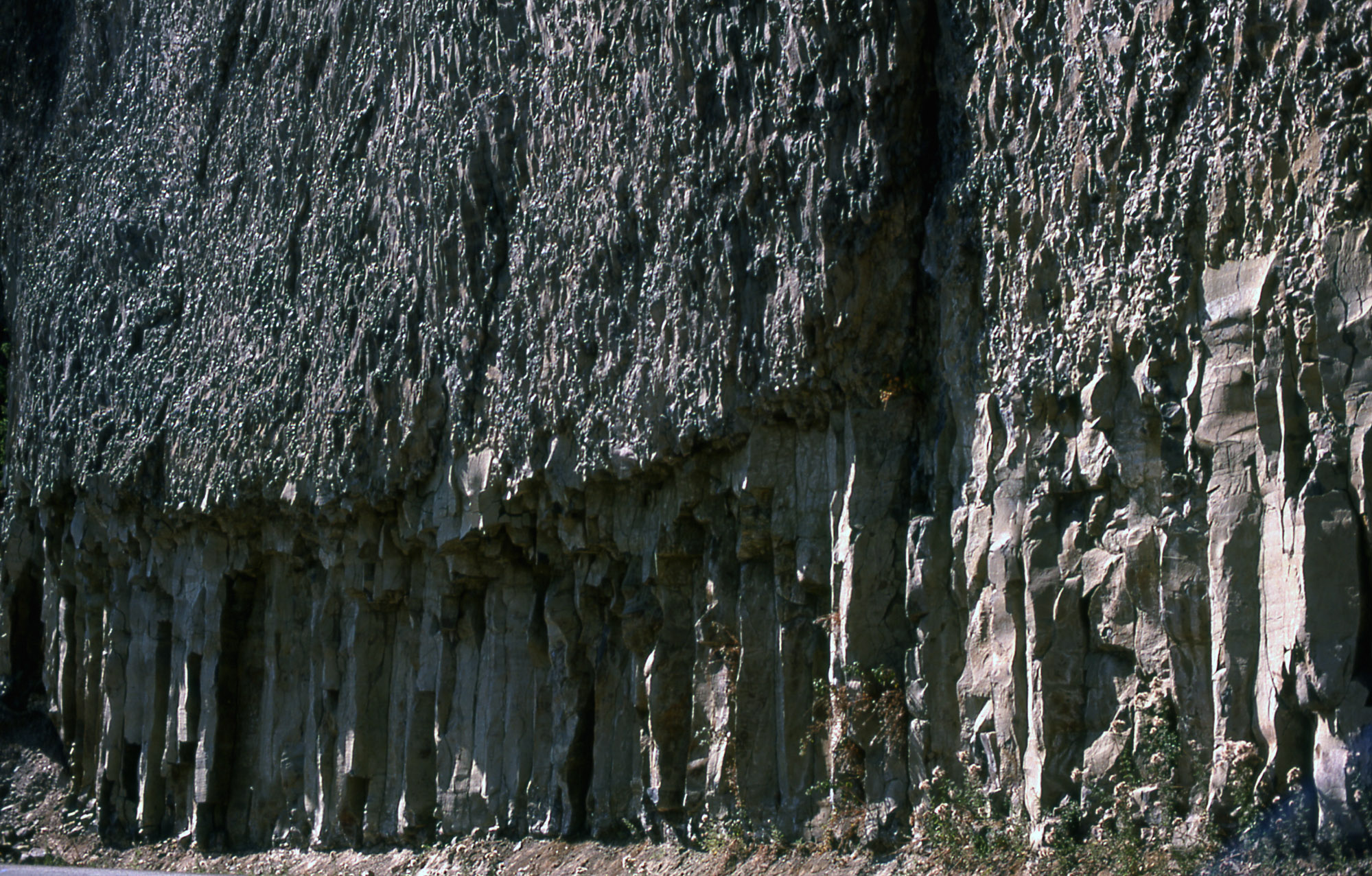
- Basalt columns at Overhanging Cliff
- Interactive map of Overhanging Cliff
- Coordinates: 44°53′44″N 110°23′22″W
- Location: Yellowstone National Park, Park County, Wyoming, United States

Overhanging Cliff is a cliff of vertical basalt that overhangs the Grand Loop Road just north of Tower Fall on the north rim of the Grand Canyon of the Yellowstone in Yellowstone National Park. The point was most likely named by a member of the Cook–Folsom–Peterson Expedition, David Folsum in 1869.
