= Clagett Butte =

Mountain in Wyoming, United States

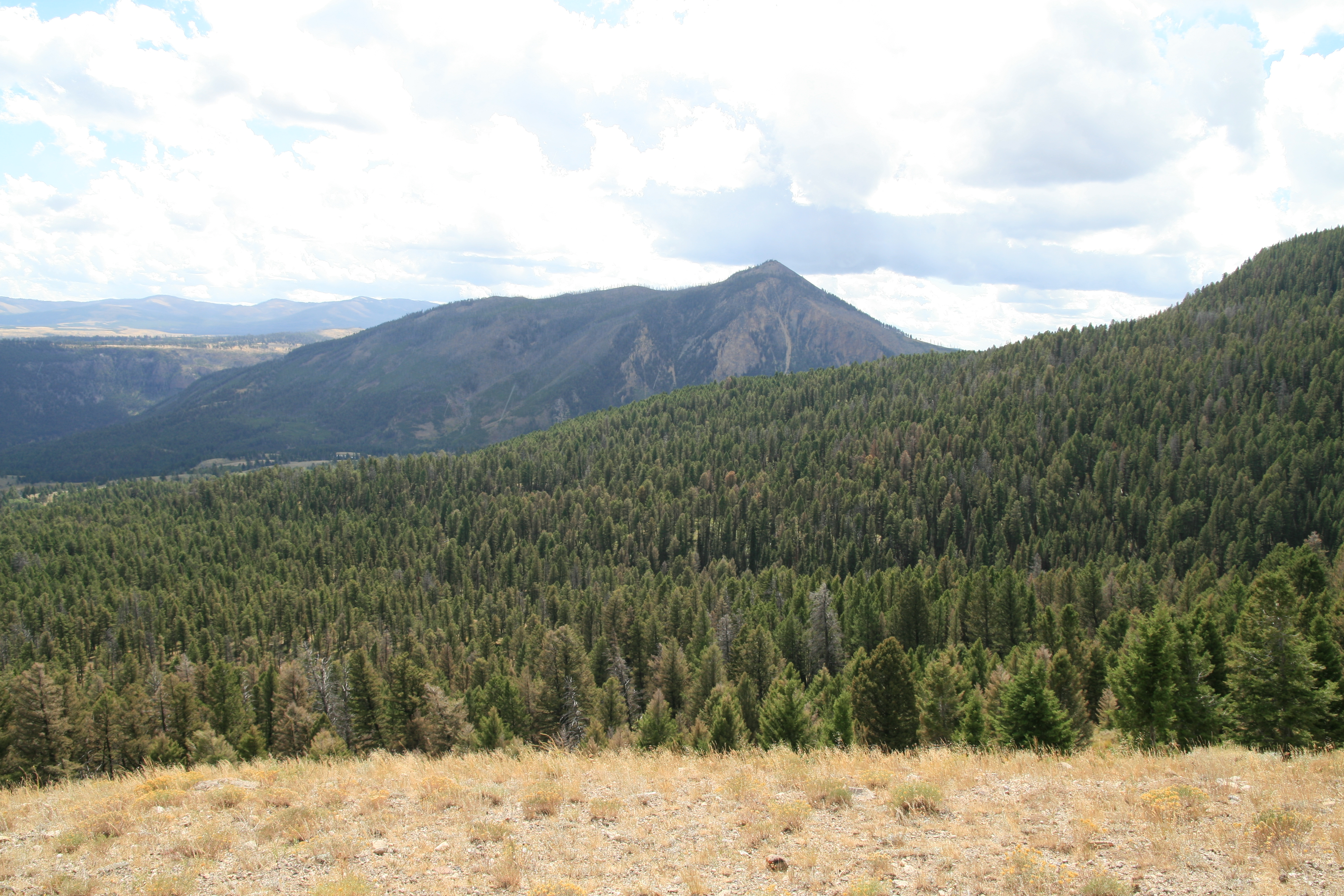
- View from Clagett Butte

Highest point
- Elevation: 8,041 ft (2,451 m)
- Coordinates: 44°57′52″N 110°44′06″W

Geography
- Location: Yellowstone National Park, Park County, Wyoming, US
- Parent range: Gallatin Range
- Topo map: Mammoth

Clagett Butte el. 8,041 feet (2,451 m) is a mountain peak butte in the Gallatin Range in Yellowstone National Park. Clagett Butte is an isolated summit 1.9 miles (3.1 km) west of Mammoth Hot Springs between Clematis Creek and Snow Pass. The Snow Pass trail passes approximately .33 miles (0.53 km) south of the butte.

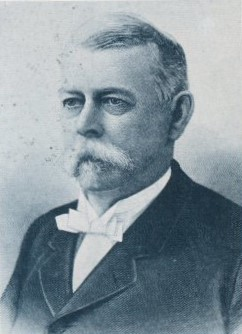
Clagett Butte's namesake, William H. Clagett

Clagett Butte was named in 1926 by park photographer Jack Ellis Haynes and then superintendent Horace Albright to honor William H. Clagett (1838–1901), the Montana Territorial Delegate who put forth the Act of Dedication bill in Congress to create Yellowstone National Park. Prior to 1926, the butte had several different names. In 1885, park guide G. L. Henderson called it Temple Mountain. That was the accepted local name for many years. In 1887, members of the Arnold Hague geological survey called it Sentinel Butte and later in 1897, Signal Butte but these names never became official.

== See also ==
- Mountains and mountain ranges of Yellowstone National Park
