= Bead Geyser =

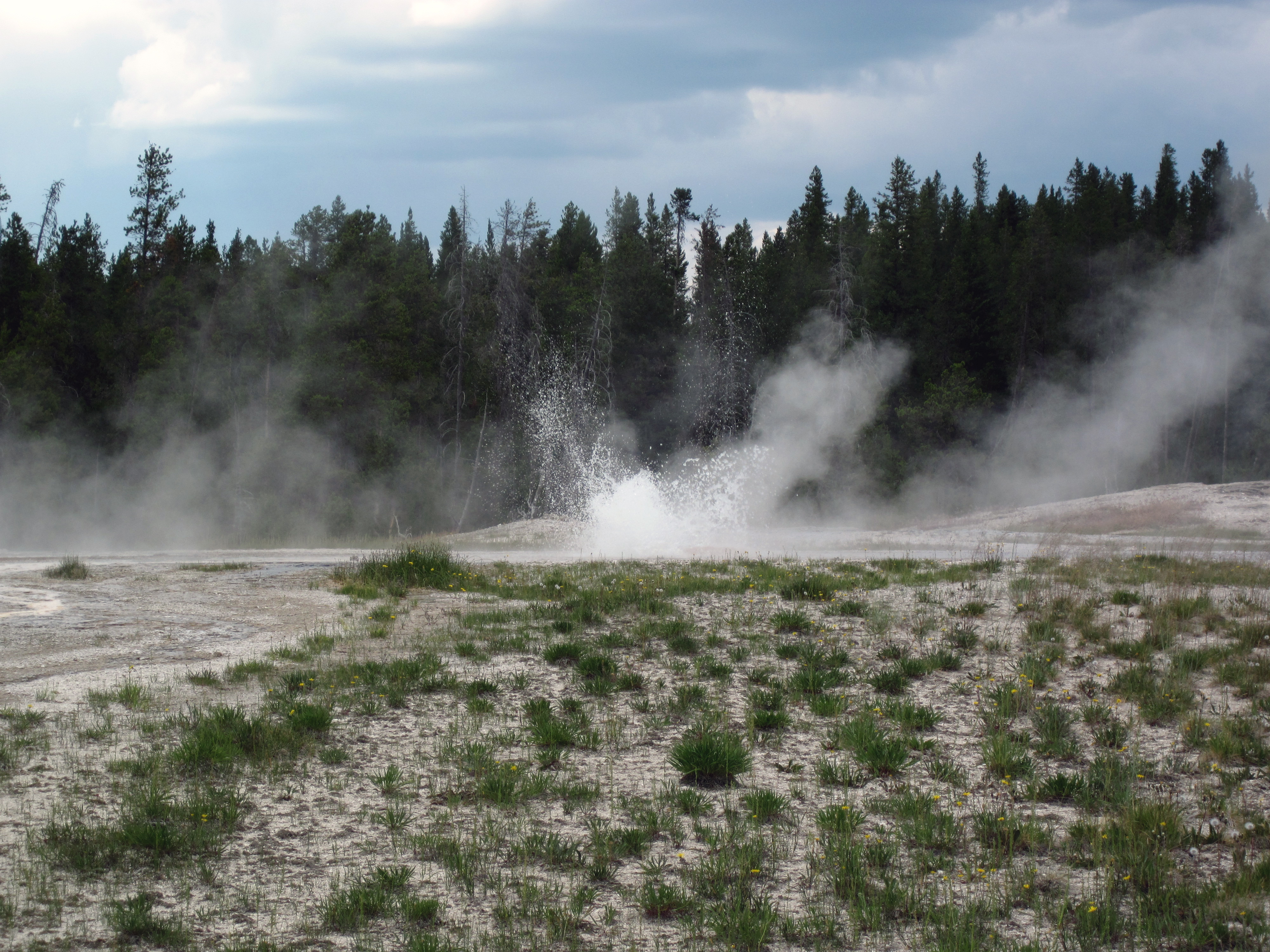
- Interactive map of Bead Geyser
- Location: Lower Geyser Basin, Yellowstone National Park, Teton County, Wyoming
- Coordinates: 44°32′36″N 110°47′43″W
- Elevation: 7,346 feet (2,239 m)
- Type: Cone geyser
- Eruption height: 25 feet (7.6 m)
- Frequency: 28-36 minutes
- Duration: 2½ minutes
- Temperature: 69.7 °C (157.5 °F)

Bead Geyser is a cone-type geyser in the Lower Geyser Basin of Yellowstone National Park in the United States.

Bead Geyser is part of the Pink Cone Group. Other geysers in this group include Box Spring, Dilemma Geyser, Labial Geyser, Labial's Satellite Geyser, Narcissus Geyser, Pink Geyser, and Pink Cone Geyser. Eruptions of Bead Geyser last about 2½ minutes and are 25 feet (7.6 m) high. Bead is an extremely regular geyser. The interval between eruptions is 28–36 minutes. This changes with time but the average for any given time hardly varies. The duration is also highly regular at about 150 seconds.

Bead Geyser was named after the geyser eggs, loose spherical pieces of geyserite, that used to be found near the geyser. Over the decades since it was discovered, souvenir hunters have removed all of the geyser eggs.
