= Pink Geyser =

Geyser in the Lower Geyser Basin of Yellowstone National Park

- Interactive map of Pink Geyser
- Location: Lower Geyser Basin, Yellowstone National Park, Teton County, Wyoming
- Coordinates: 44.5433745°N 110.7963353°W
- Type: Fountain-type geyser
- Eruption height: 20 feet (6.1 m)
- Frequency: 2 to 12 hours
- Duration: usually 3 to 8 minutes
- Temperature: 91.1 °C (196.0 °F)

Pink Geyser is a fountain-type geyser in the Lower Geyser Basin of Yellowstone National Park in the United States.

Pink Geyser is part of the Pink Cone Group. Other geysers in this groups include Bead Geyser, Box Spring, Dilemma Geyser, Labial Geyser, Labial's Satellite Geyser, Narcissus Geyser, and Pink Cone Geyser.

Most eruptions of Pink Geyser last about 3 to 8 minutes and reach 20 feet (6.1 m) in height and end with a steam phase. Intervals (= eruption start to eruption start) are less than 2 to 12 hours, with a median of about 3.5 hours. (see also the GeyserTimes.org database)

Pink Geyser was named for the pinkish coloration of the geyserite around its vent, which is attributed to manganese oxide and iron oxide staining. Similar colors occur at nearby geysers, including Pink Cone Geyser and Narcissus Geyser. This indicates a common water chemistry, but their eruptive behaviors do not affect each other.

Pink Geyser is susceptible to seismic activity. Before the 1983 Borah Peak earthquake, it only erupted twice a day. Following the quake, its interval shortened to between 5 and 7 hours. The 2002 Denali earthquake shortened the intervals even more.
