= Labial Geyser =

Geyser in the Lower Geyser Basin of Yellowstone National Park

- Interactive map of Labial Geyser
- Location: Lower Geyser Basin, Yellowstone National Park, Teton County, Wyoming
- Coordinates: 44.543674°N 110.7952828°W
- Type: Fountain-type geyser
- Eruption height: 25 feet (7.6 m)
- Frequency: 5 to 9 hours
- Duration: 1 minute
- Temperature: 91.6 °C (196.9 °F)

Labial Geyser is a fountain-type geyser in the Lower Geyser Basin of Yellowstone National Park in the United States. It is part of the Pink Cone Group. Other geysers in this groups are Labial's Satellite Geyser, Bead Geyser, Box Spring, Dilemma Geyser, Narcissus Geyser, Pink Geyser, and Pink Cone Geyser.

Eruptions of Labial Geyser last for less than one minute and reach about 25 feet (7.6 m) high. The usual interval between eruptions is 6–9 hours. On occasion, an eruption will be followed within 30 minutes by a second eruption. Before the eruption, the water rises and falls in the vent. During the last few minutes Labial's surging becomes violent, and this eventually triggers an eruption. During the eruption, three vents are active, with jetting at different angles. Labial jets up to 25 feet (7.6 m) high at a sharp angle, another vent bursts up to 6 feet (1.8 m) high, and a related spring splashes 1–2 feet (0.30–0.61 m) high. Following the eruption, Labial continues to have bursts that spray water from the hole, and these rarely lead to a brief but full-force second or even third eruption!

Labial Geyser has two satellite geysers (Labial's Satellite Geyser) that react to Labial eruptions but have been seen to act independently as well. Their intervals are not predictable. Full eruptions are 12 to 15 minutes in duration, with the eastern vent dominating. The eastern vent reaches 6 feet (1.8 m), while the western vent reaches 10 feet (3.0 m). Minor eruptions, usually originating from the eastern vent, are less than one minute in duration and less energetic than full eruptions.
