= Salvatore Vasapolli =

- Born: Salvatore Joseph Vaspol; 1955 (age 70–71); New Jersey, US
- Education: grammar school, High School, College
- Occupations: Photographer, musician and conservationist
- Parent(s): Salvatore Vaspol and Angelina Marchese
- Website: www.vasapolliphotography.com

Salvatore Marchesi-Vasapolli (born 1955) is an American artist best known for his art photographic prints of the American landscape.

Vasapolli photographed the large format photographic book, Montana, with text written by Montana's ex-congressman John Patrick Williams. It was published by Graphic Arts Center, Portland, Oregon. The book depicts the state's people, as well as natural, historical, and city landscapes. The book won both the 2004 North American and World SAPPI publishing Gold Awards. In 2008, his second book, Montana: Portrait of a State, was released. Vasapolli also produces several state and national park calendars on subjects such as Montana, New Jersey, and Yellowstone National Park. His photographs hang or have been hung in private collections, corporations, galleries, and museums coast to coast. Mr. Vasapolli has also received 7 ADDY awards, advertising's highest honor. In 2008 and 2009, over 23,000 people viewed his exhibition "Northern Rockies: The Introspective Landscape" at the Museum of the Rockies, Bozeman, Mt.

== Childhood ==
Born in New Jersey, Vasapolli first learned to develop and print black and white photographs at the age of 8 at the Boys Club of Garfield, New Jersey. He began playing the drums at the age of nine and performed with the Garfield Cadets and Muchachos Drum and Bugle Corps in 1965–1971. He has also played with several rock and roll, jazz bands, and symphonic orchestras throughout New Jersey, including the Billings Symphony in Montana. In 1982, Salvatore captured the USSA's Masters Slalom State Skiing Championship titles in both Pennsylvania and New Jersey. He is an avid racing cyclist and competed on the Montana USA Cycling Master's circuit for many years, and he sponsored his own junior team while the owner of Livingston Cycle of Livingston, Montana.

== Education ==
Self-taught in photography, Vasapolli received his Bachelor of Science (BS) in Music (percussion) and Arts (history) from William Paterson University in Wayne, New Jersey, in 1983, after matriculating from County College of Morris.

== Career ==
Vasapolli became a professional photographer, drawing greatly upon his college degree in the arts. First concentrating on the natural wonders of Yellowstone Park and Montana, then covering much of the United States, he quickly became a supplier of stock photography for many major publishers, including covers for National Geographic, Backpacker Magazine, Adventure West, Architectural Digest, Audubon, Ski, Bike, Forbes, Skiing, Powder, Photo Techniques, New York Times, MacMillan, Random House, Simon & Schuster, Workman, Nature Conservancy, Sierra, National Wildlife Federation, and many others.

He is a regular contributor to Outdoor Photographer.

== Reception ==
His prints are highly acclaimed for their high perspective foreground detail. His solo exhibition "Northern Rockies: The Introspective Landscape" at the Museum of the Rockies, Bozeman, Montana, ran from October 11, 2008, to February 4, 2009, and received wide acclaim for its unique compositions and light.

His corporate sponsors have included Epson USA, Outdoor Photographer, Moab Paper, and Halter Ranch Winery.

== Photographic books ==
- Montana, 2004. Graphic Arts Center, ISBN 978-1-55868-696-0
- Montana: Portrait of a State, 2008 Graphic Arts Center, ISBN 978-0-88240-753-1
- Yellowstone: the introspective landscape, 2010 Vas Apollo Publishing
- Yellowstone Vol. 1, 2010 Vas Apollo Publishing

== Exhibits ==
- Sussex County Arts Heritage Council, Newton, NJ October 10, 2009
- Museum Of The Rockies, Bozeman, Mt October 10, 2008- February 4, 2009
- Salvatore Vasapolli Gallery, 2005- Bozeman, Montana 2005
- Emerson Cultural Center, Bozeman Montana- 2004
- Paris Gibson Square, Great Falls Montana- 2003
- Yellowstone Reflections Gallery, Livingston Montana 2003
- Montana Trails, Bozeman, Montana 1998
- Toucan Gallery, Billings, Montana 1996
- Danforth Gallery, Livingston Montana 1995

== Calendars ==
- Montana: 12 Photographs. Graphic Arts Center (produced from 1995 to 2009) ISBN 978-0-88240-636-7
- Yellowstone National Park: 12 Photographs. Browntrout (produced from 1996 to 2003) ISBN 978-0-7631-4077-9
