= Dilemma Geyser =

Geyser in the Lower Geyser Basin of Yellowstone National Park

- Interactive map of Dilemma Geyser
- Name origin: Unofficial
- Location: Lower Geyser Basin, Yellowstone National Park, Teton County, Wyoming
- Coordinates: 44°32′07″N 110°47′59″W
- Eruption height: 1 to 2 feet (0.30 to 0.61 m)
- Frequency: occasional

Dilemma Geyser is a geyser in the Lower Geyser Basin of Yellowstone National Park in the United States. It is part of the Pink Cone complex. Other geysers in this group are Bead Geyser, Box Spring, Labial Geyser, Labial's Satellite Geyser, Narcissus Geyser, Pink Geyser, and Pink Cone Geyser.

Eruptions of Dilemma Geyser are rare. When active, they vary from a few seconds to a few minutes in duration and reach as high as 10 feet (3.0 m) in springtime with 1 to 4 feet (0.30 to 1.22 m) the rest of the year. Intervals (= eruption start to eruption start) are 2 to 10 minutes.

Before 1989, this geyser had tiny eruptions, with a few water drops reaching above grass level. However, the two vents are surrounded by developed runoff channels. The inadequacy of the observed eruption water volumes to produce the channels was the inspiration for the name "Dilemma Geyser". In 1989, more forceful eruptions occurred, with water runoff volumes sufficient to explain the channels.

Dilemma was recorded to be most active in 1996 and sporadically in the 2000s. Its last eruption was June 12, 2022, following an almost 16 year absence in eruptions.

The RCN location of this geyser has been unintentionally switched with A-0 Geyser, elsewhere in the Lower Geyser Basin.
