= Narcissus Geyser =

Geyser in the Lower Geyser Basin of Yellowstone National Park

- Interactive map of Narcissus Geyser
- Location: Lower Geyser Basin, Yellowstone National Park, Teton County, Wyoming
- Coordinates: 44.5443355°N 110.7969696°W
- Elevation
- Type: Fountain geyser
- Eruption height: 20 ft (6.1 m)
- Frequency: 2-6 hours
- Duration: 5-8 minutes
- Temperature: 77.3 °C (171.1 °F)

Narcissus Geyser is a geyser in the Lower Geyser Basin of Yellowstone National Park in the United States. Narcissus Geyser is part of the Pink Cone Group. Other geysers in this group are Bead Geyser, Box Spring, Dilemma Geyser, Labial Geyser, Labial's Satellite Geyser, Pink Geyser, and Pink Cone Geyser.

== History ==
During the 1880s, members of the Hague Party named Narcissus Geyser. In Greek mythology, Narcissus was renowned for his beauty. He was overly prideful, and disdained those who loved him. As divine punishment he fell in love with his own reflection in a pool, not realizing it was merely an image. He wasted away to death, being unable to leave that which he loved.

== Eruptions ==
Narcissus Geyser has minor and major eruptions. Minor eruptions last 5 to 8 minutes and are 20 feet (6.1 m) high. Major eruptions last up to 15 minutes and are 15 feet (4.6 m) high. The interval between eruptions is 2 1/4 and 6 hours.

This geyser is the hardest to see in the Pink Cone Group as it is located furthest from the road and is partially screened by trees. Its cone is the same pink color as Pink and Pink Cone Geysers indicating that they may be tied together though they do not seem to interact.
