= Beehive Geyser =

Geyser in Yellowstone Park

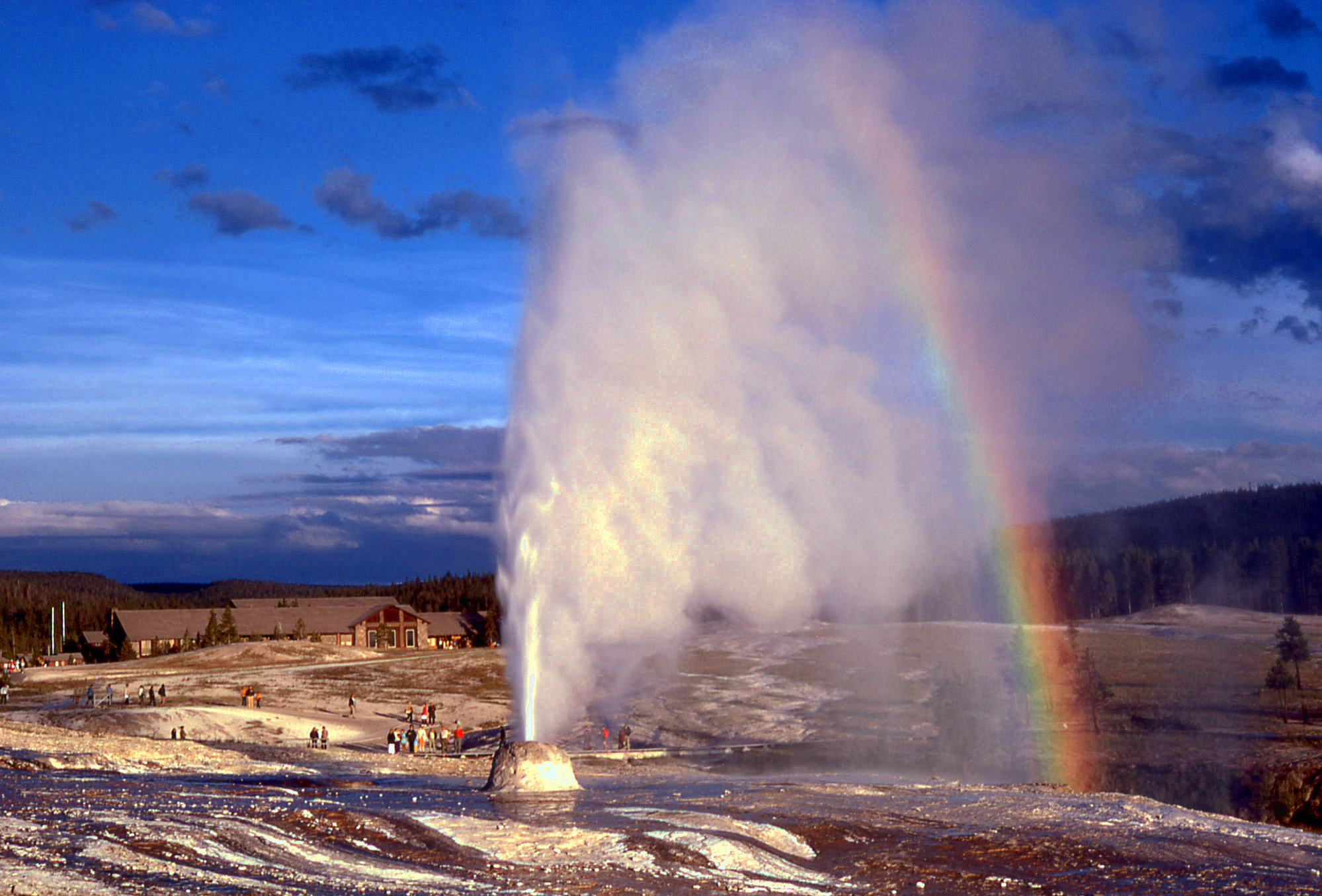
- Beehive eruption

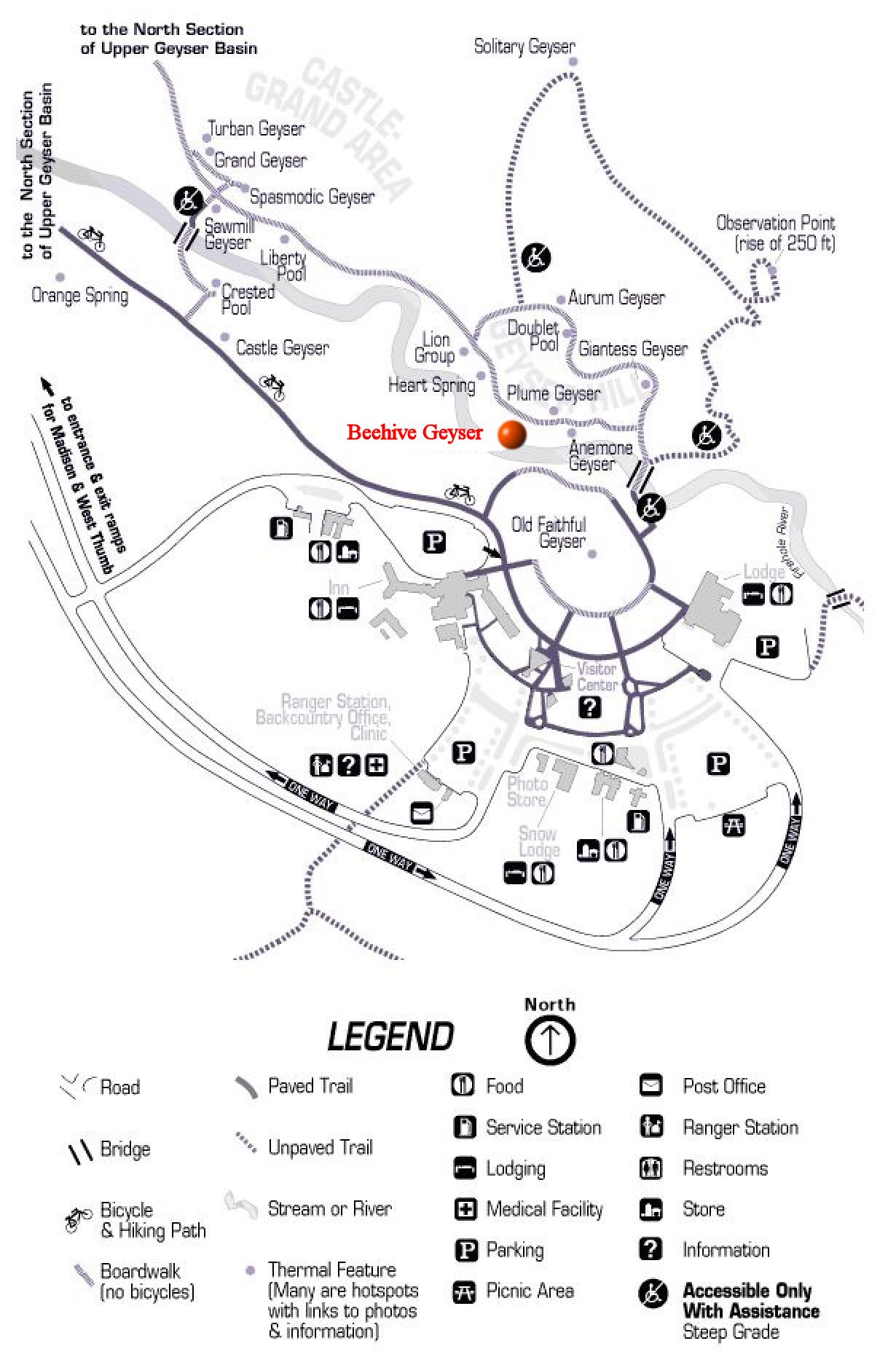
- Southern section of Upper Geyser Basin
- Name origin: Named on September 18, 1870 by the Washburn-Langford-Doane Expedition
- Location: Upper Geyser Basin, Yellowstone National Park, Teton County, Wyoming
- Coordinates: 44°27′47″N 110°49′48″W
- Elevation: 7,362 feet (2,244 m)
- Type: Cone geyser
- Eruption height: 200 feet (61 m)
- Frequency: 8 to 24 hours
- Duration: 5 minutes

Beehive Geyser is a geyser in the Upper Geyser Basin of Yellowstone National Park in the United States. The 4-foot (1.2 m) tall cone resembles a straw beehive. Beehive's Indicator is a small, jagged cone-type geyser located about 10 feet (3.0 m) from Beehive.

== History ==
On September 18, 1870 the Washburn-Langford-Doane Expedition entered the Upper Geyser Basin along the Firehole River. During a day and a half of exploration they named seven geysers they observed erupting. The Beehive was one of them. The following is Langford's description of the Beehive in his 1871 account of the expedition:

A hundred yards distant from The Giantess was a silicious cone, very symmetrical but slightly corrugated upon its exterior surface, three feet in height and five feet in diameter at its base, and having an oval orifice twentyfour [sic] by thirty-six and one-half inches in diameter, with scalloped edges. Not one of our company supposed that it was a geyser; and among so manywonders [sic] it had almost escaped notice. While we were at breakfast upon the morning of our departure a column of water, entirely filling the crater, shot from it, which, by accurate triangular measurement, we found to be two hundred and nineteen feet in height. The stream did not deflect more than four or five degrees from a vertical line, and the eruption lasted eighteen minutes. We named it "The Beehive."

== Eruptions ==
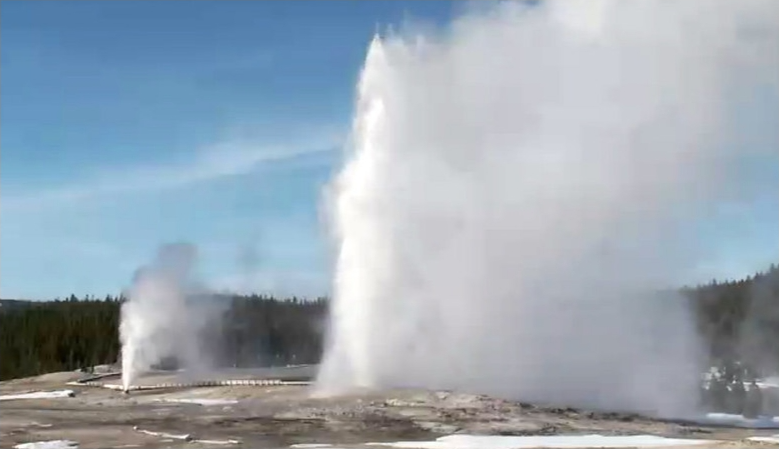
On rare occasions at the right point, Beehive (seen in the distance) will synchronize eruptions with the larger nearby Old Faithful.

Eruptions of Beehive Geyser last about 5 minutes and are 200 feet (61 m) high. The fountain maintains its full height for the duration of the eruption, dropping just slightly near the end. A short, weak steam phase concludes the eruption. The interval between eruptions ranges from less than 10 hours to over a day. There are occasions in both summer and winter that there are a series of eruptions that are quite regular. These eruptions have an interval of 10 to 20 hours with longer intervals near the end of the series. As of summer 2009 Beehive was having predictable eruptions every 11 to 14 hrs.

=== Sequence ===
Near Beehive is a smaller geyser that can often be used as an indicator of a pending eruption of Beehive. This geyser, named Beehive's Indicator, sends up a 6-to-15-foot (1.8 to 4.6 m) fountain between a few seconds and 30 minutes before Beehive erupts, averaging 15 to 20 minutes prior. Once Beehive starts erupting, the Indicator continues to play during part of the Beehive eruption and then stops. However, on occasion Beehive Geyser can erupt without the Indicator.

For a period of three years in the 1990s, Beehive was dormant. During this time, the Indicator would erupt for extended periods, as long as 60 minutes, with no Beehive eruption.

Images of Beehive Geyser
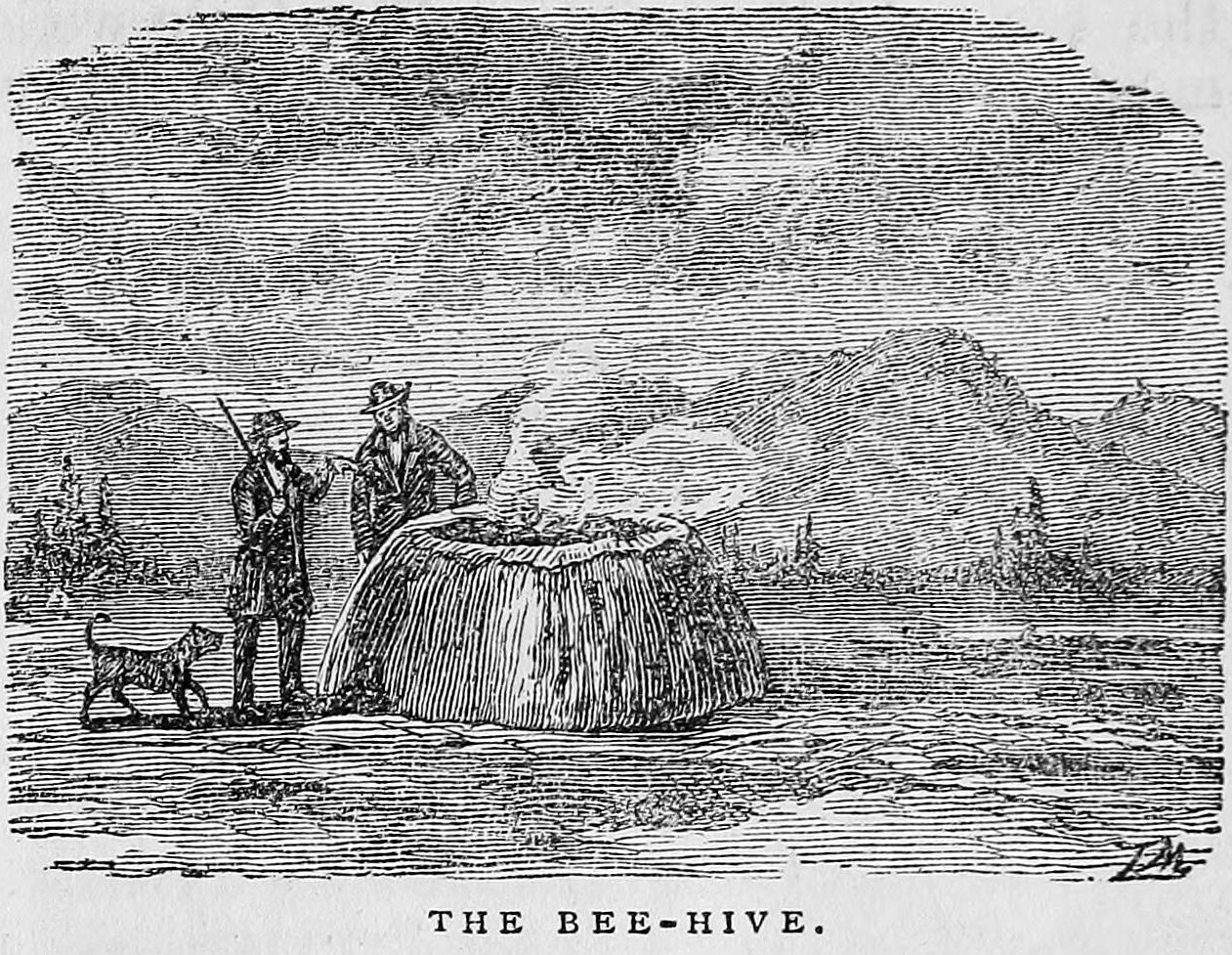
1871 sketch of the Beehive

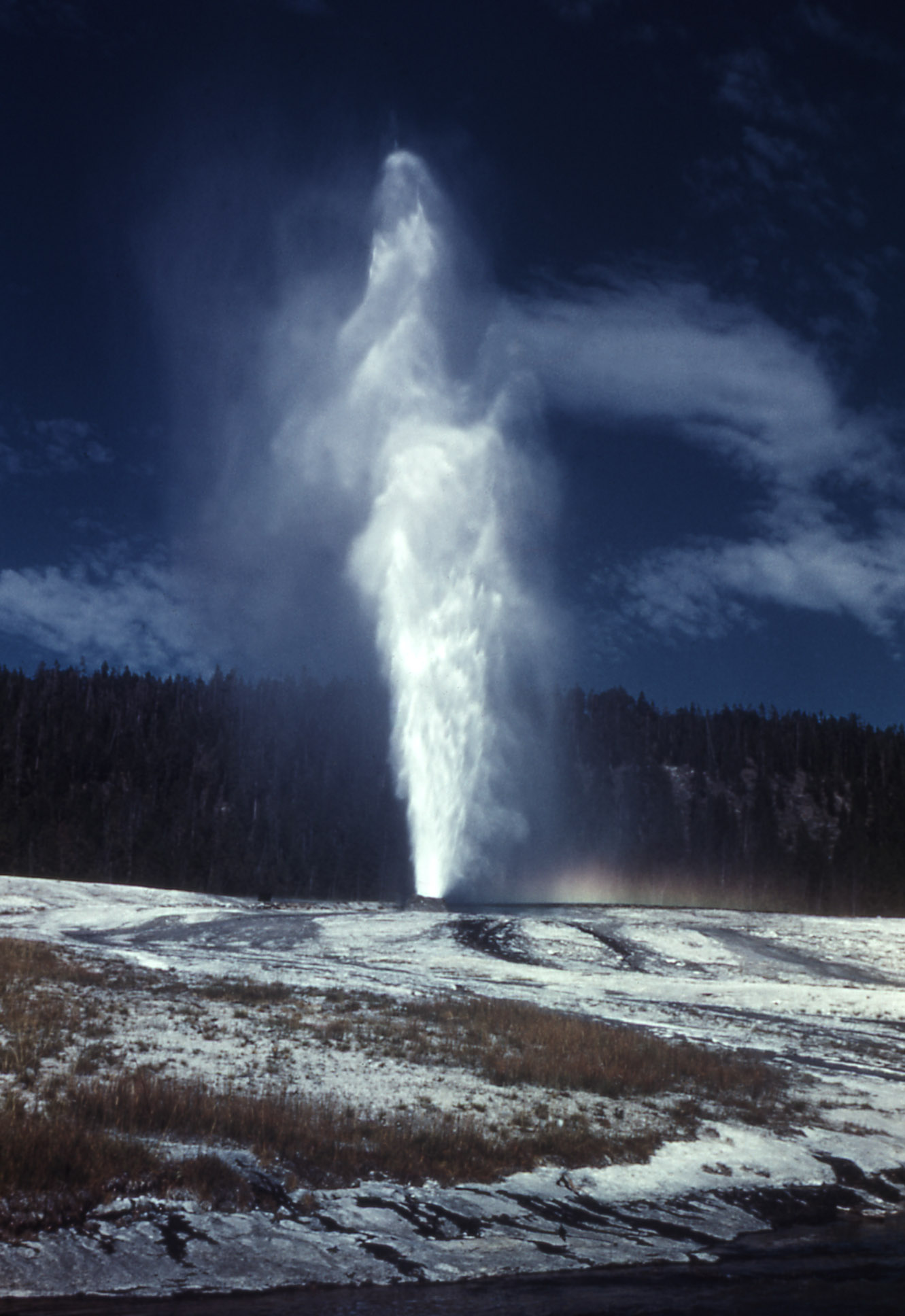
Eruption

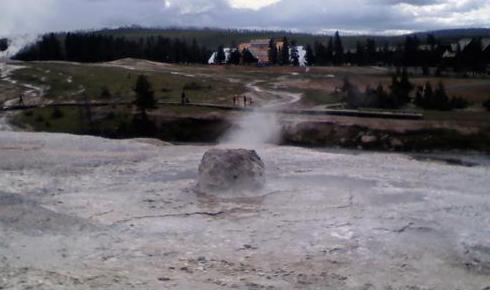
The geyser between eruptions

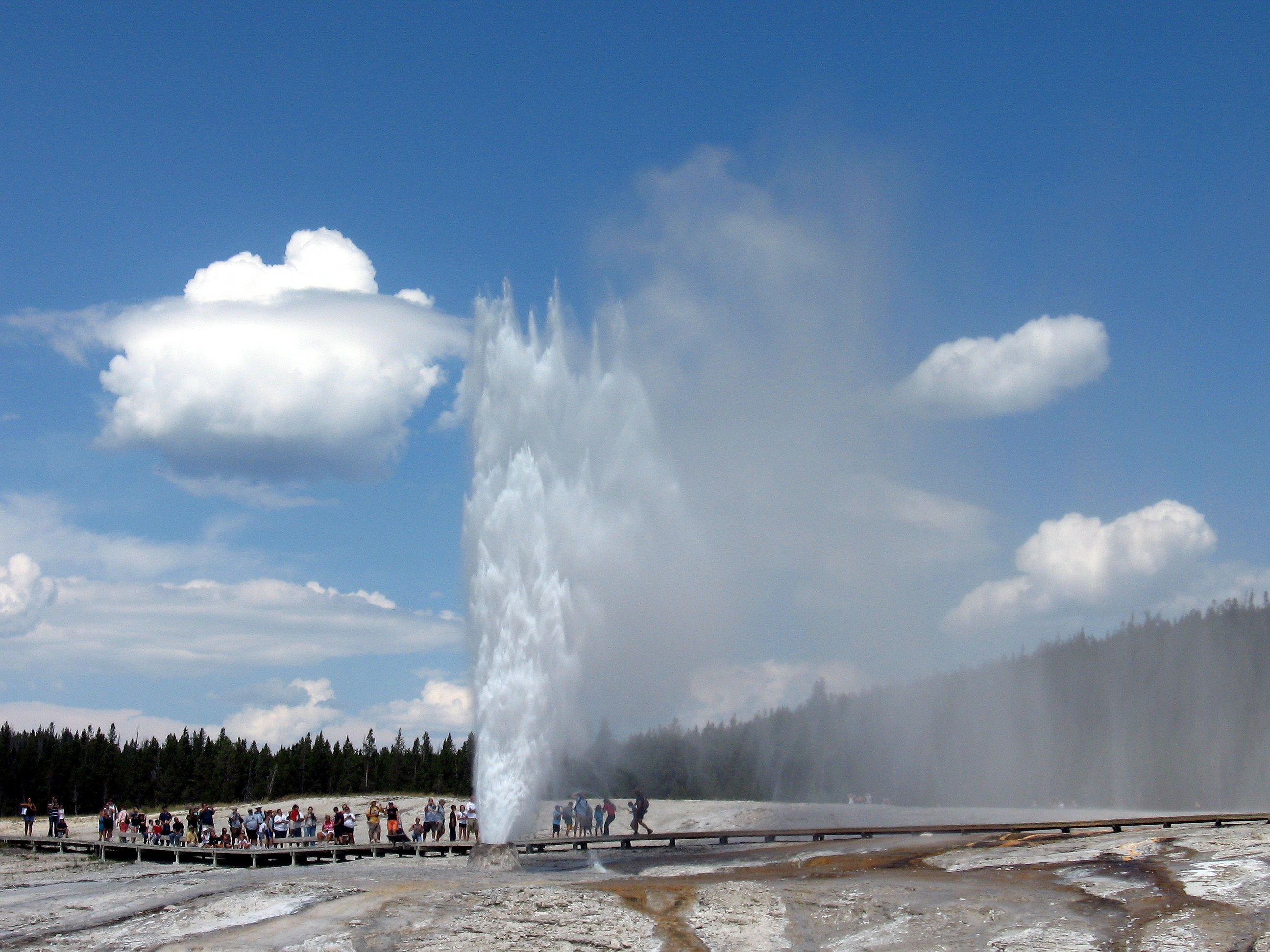
Eruption in Summer
