= Aurum Geyser =

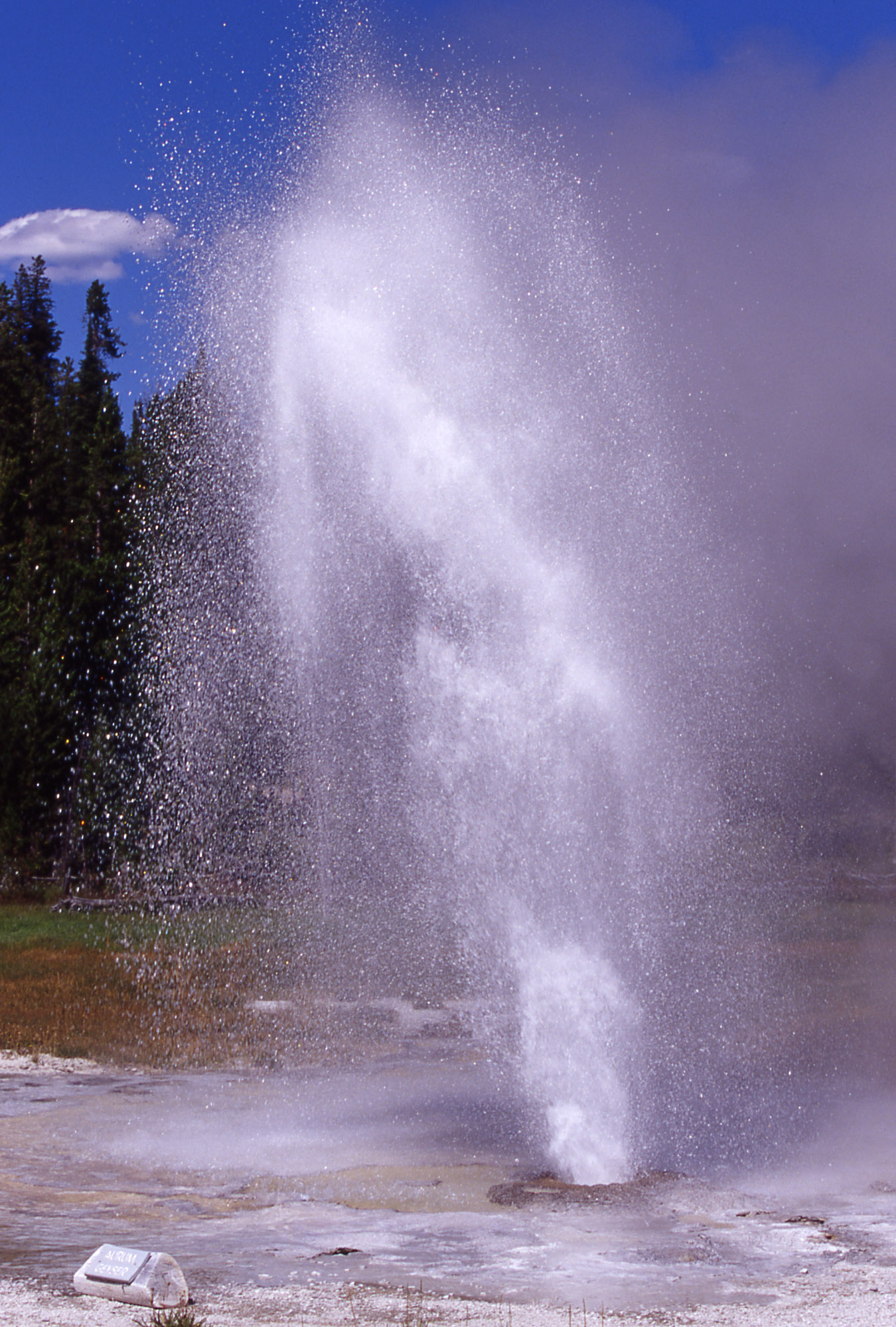
- Aurum Geyser in eruption
- Interactive map of Aurum Geyser
- Location: Upper Geyser Basin, Yellowstone National Park, Teton County, Wyoming
- Coordinates: 44°27′52″N 110°49′46″W
- Type: Cone geyser
- Eruption height: 15–25 feet (4.6–7.6 m)
- Frequency: 3 to 7 hours
- Duration: 90 seconds
- Temperature: 91.5 °C (196.7 °F)

Aurum Geyser is a geyser in the Upper Geyser Basin of Yellowstone National Park in the United States, on Geyser Hill.

Aurum can, at times, be very predictable. Other times it can be very erratic. Observations have led to the theory that Aurum's activity is linked to the meadow behind the geyser. When the meadow is wet, activity is regular with 3 to 4 hours between eruptions. When the meadow dries in late summer and early fall, the interval becomes less predictable ranging from 4 to 7 hours. Aurum also participates in the weekly Geyser Hill wave. It decreases and increases its interval at regular times during a week.

Eruptions last about 90 seconds and range in height from 15 feet (4.6 m) to 25 feet (7.6 m). An eruption is usually preceded by bubbling in two small vents nearby. On rare occasions, an eruption will be followed by a second smaller eruption 5 to 10 minutes after the primary eruption.
