= Lion Geyser =

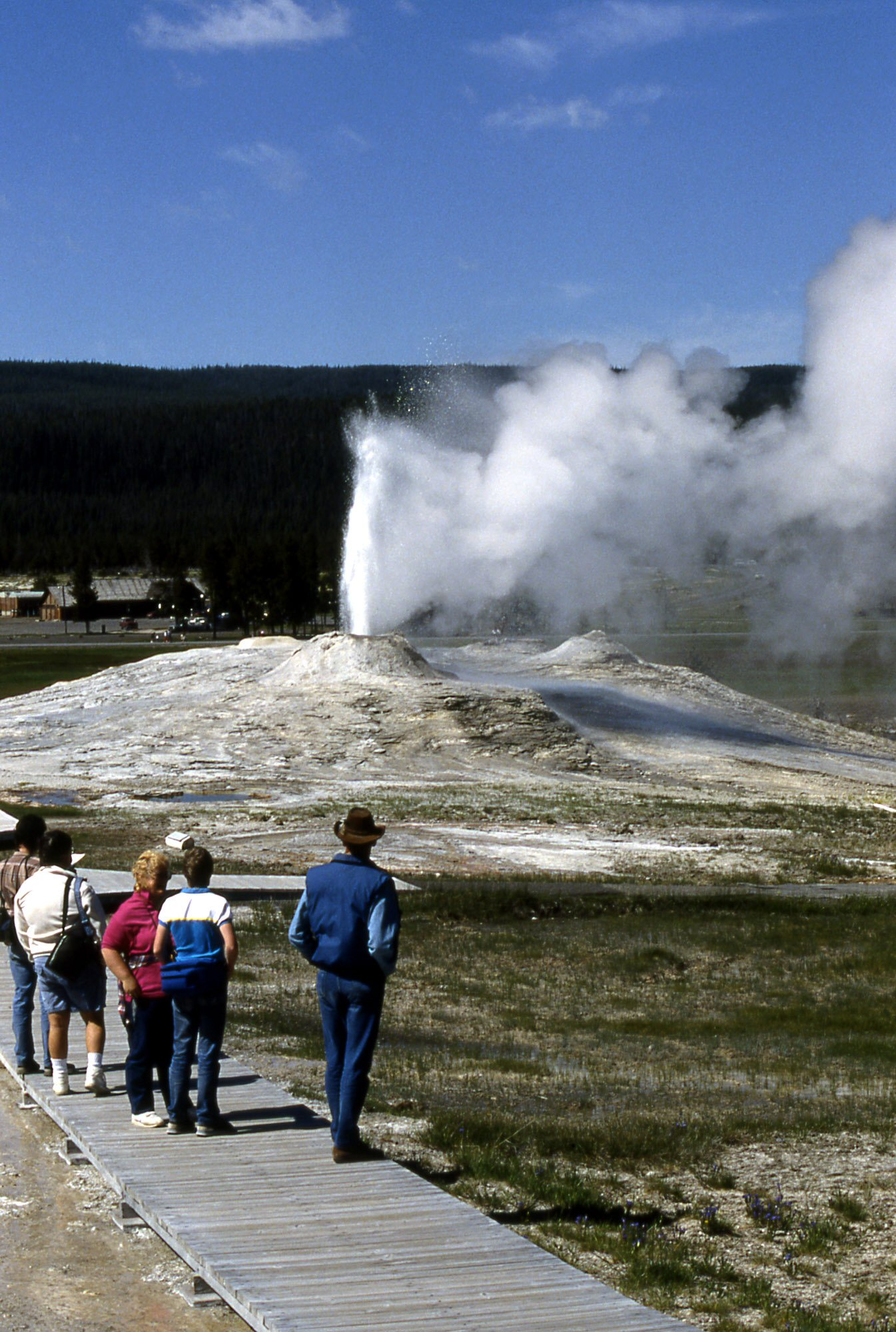
- Eruption, 1987
- Interactive map of Lion Geyser
- Location: Upper Geyser Basin, Yellowstone National Park, Teton County, Wyoming
- Coordinates: 44.4640243°N 110.8309603°W
- Elevation: 7,405 feet (2,257 m)
- Type: Cone geyser
- Eruption height: 90 feet (27 m)
- Duration: 7 minutes
- Temperature: 92.1 °C (197.8 °F)

Lion Geyser is a cone-type geyser in the Upper Geyser Basin of Yellowstone National Park in the United States. It is located in the Geyser Hill complex.

It was named for the roaring sound of steam releasing during an eruption. Eruptions can reach 90 feet (27 m) and last from 1 to 7 minutes. Lion is the largest of the Lion Group which includes Little Cub Geyser and the currently inactive Big Cub and Lioness geysers.

Images of Lion Geyser
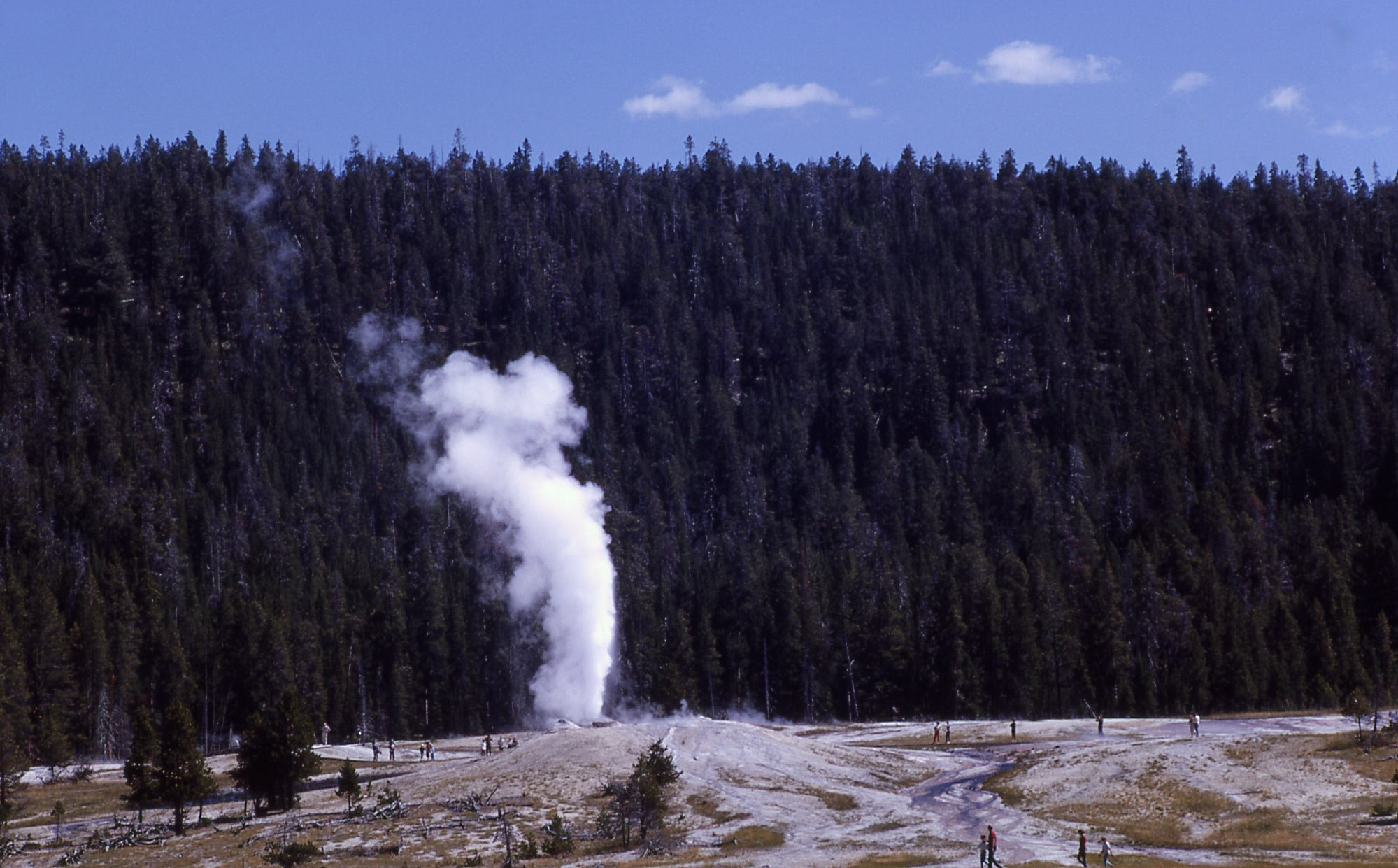
Eruption, 1967

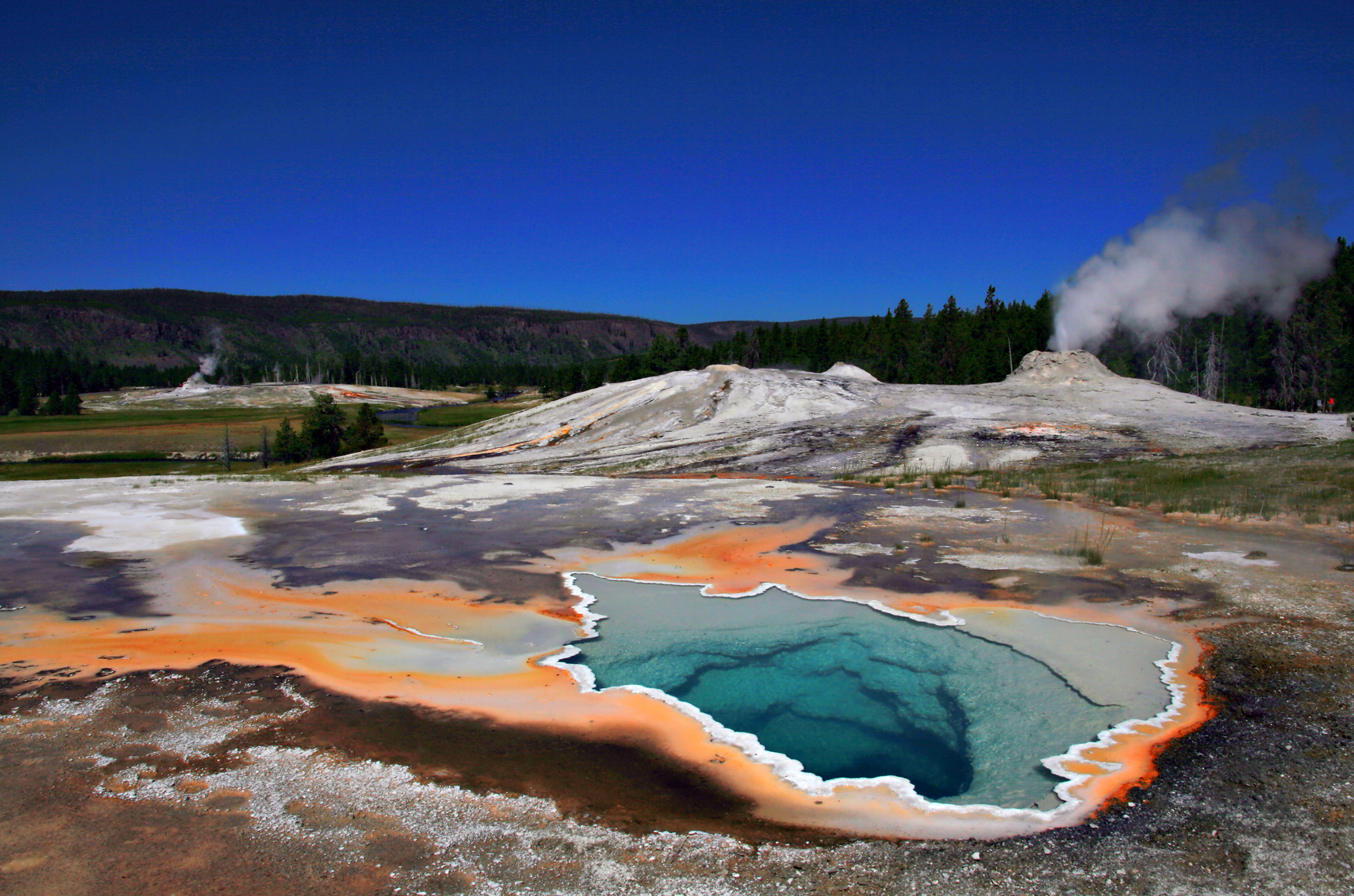
Lion Geyser behind Heart Spring
