= Hotels and tourist camps of Yellowstone National Park =

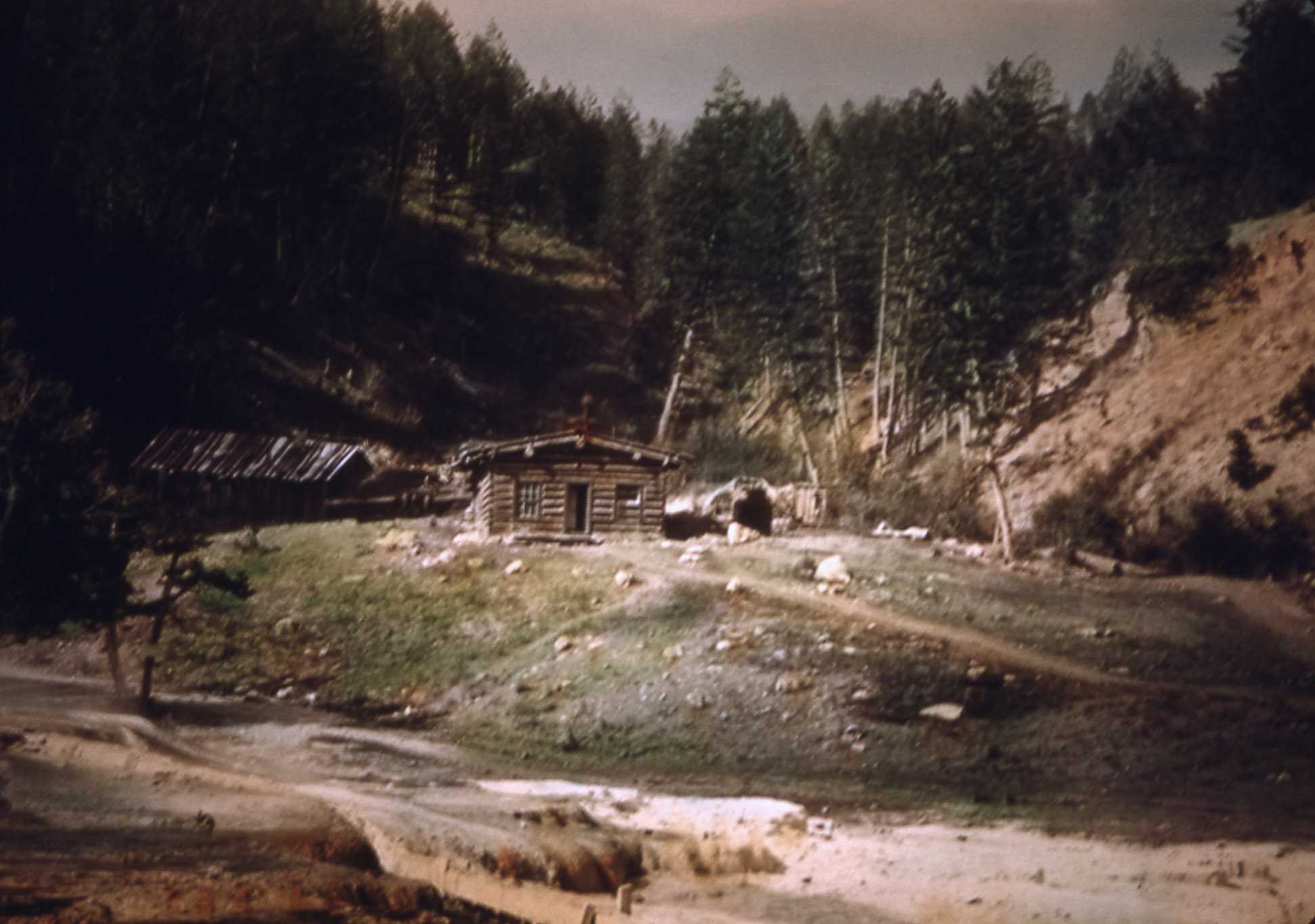
McCartney's Hotel, Clematis Gulch, the 1st hotel in Yellowstone. Built in 1871

Since before the creation of Yellowstone National Park in 1872, entrepreneurs have established hotels and permanent tourist camps to accommodate visitors to the park. Today, Xanterra Parks and Resorts operates hotel and camping concessions in the park on behalf of the National Park Service. This is a list of hotels and permanent tourist camps that have operated or continue to operate in the park.

== Hotels ==
=== Mammoth Hot Springs area ===
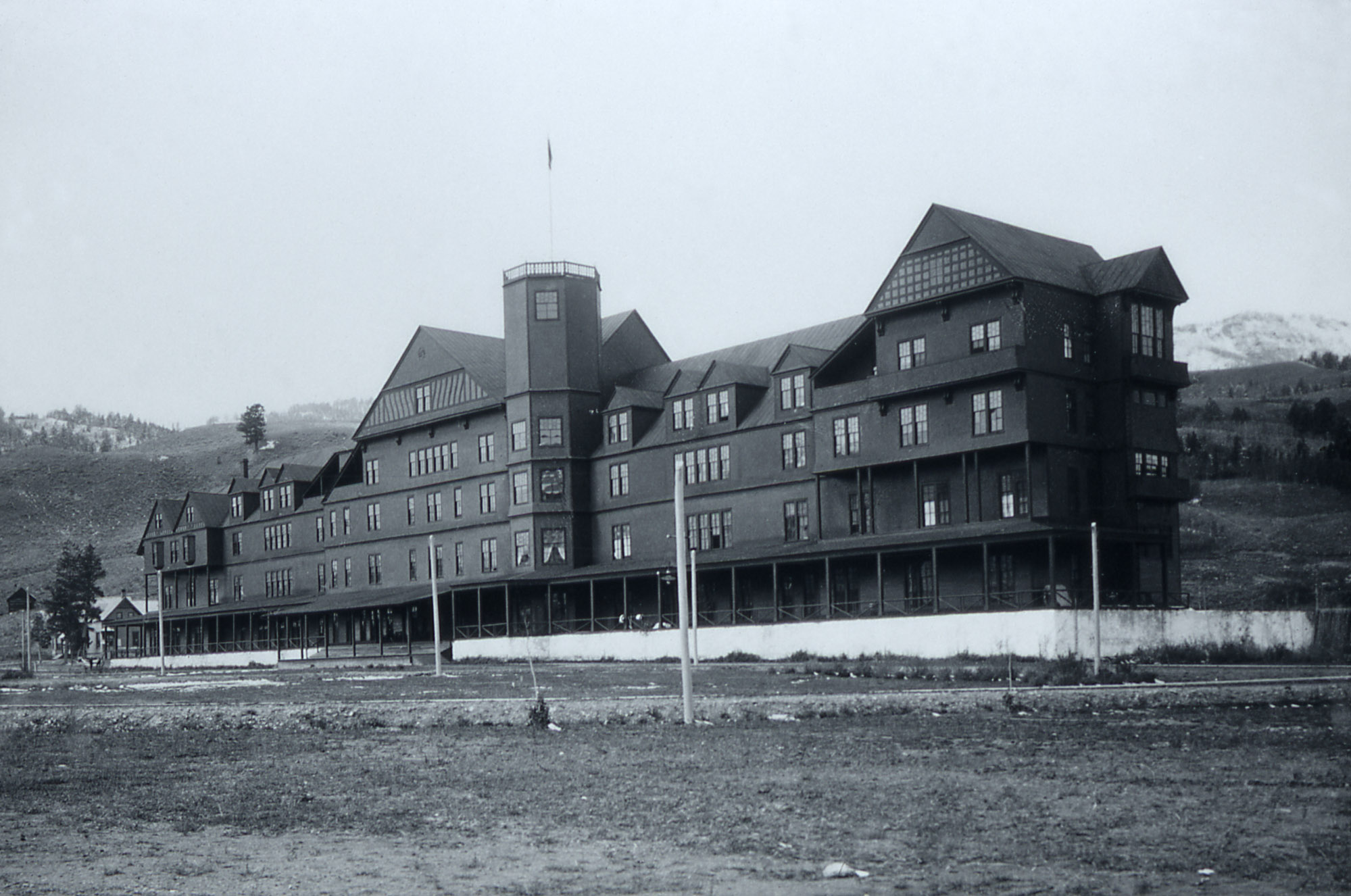
Mammoth Hotel, ca 1913

- Wylie Hotel, Gardiner, Montana
- McCartney's Hotel, 1871–79, Clematis Gulch
- Cottage Hotel, 1885–1921, operated by Walter and Helen Anderson.
- National Hotel, 1893–1904, Changed name to Mammoth Hotel in 1904.
- Mammoth Hotel, 1904–1936, Changed name to Mammoth Springs Hotel and Cottages.
- Mammoth Springs Hotel and Cottages, 1939–1965, Changed name to Mammoth Motor Inn.
- Mammoth Motor Inn, 1966–1977, Changed name to Mammoth Hot Springs Hotel.
- Mammoth Hot Springs Hotel, 1978 to present.

=== Norris ===
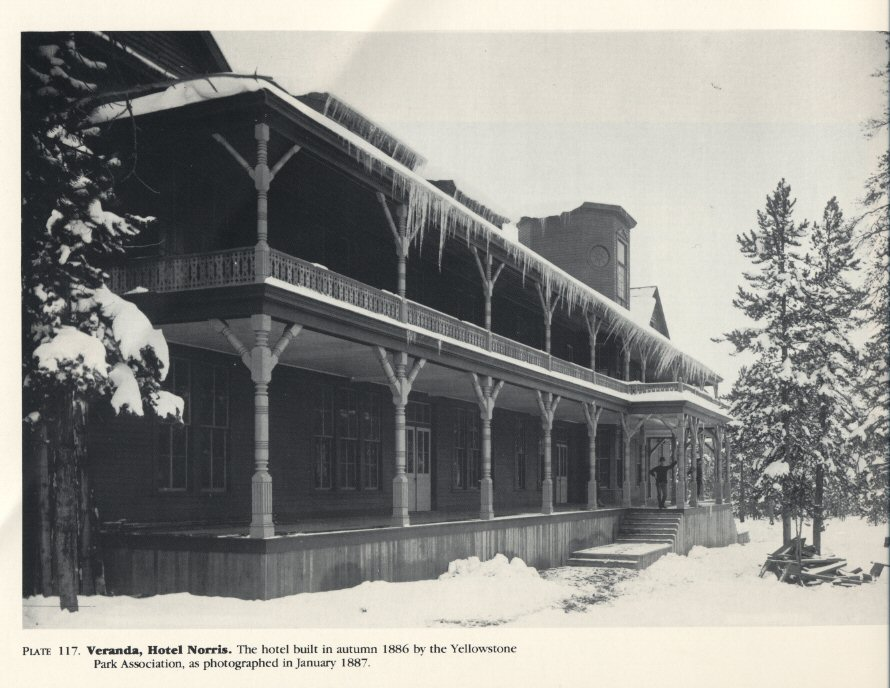
Norris Hotel, 1887

- Norris Hotel, 1886–87, 1901–1917, built and operated the Yellowstone Park Association

=== Lower Geyser Basin ===
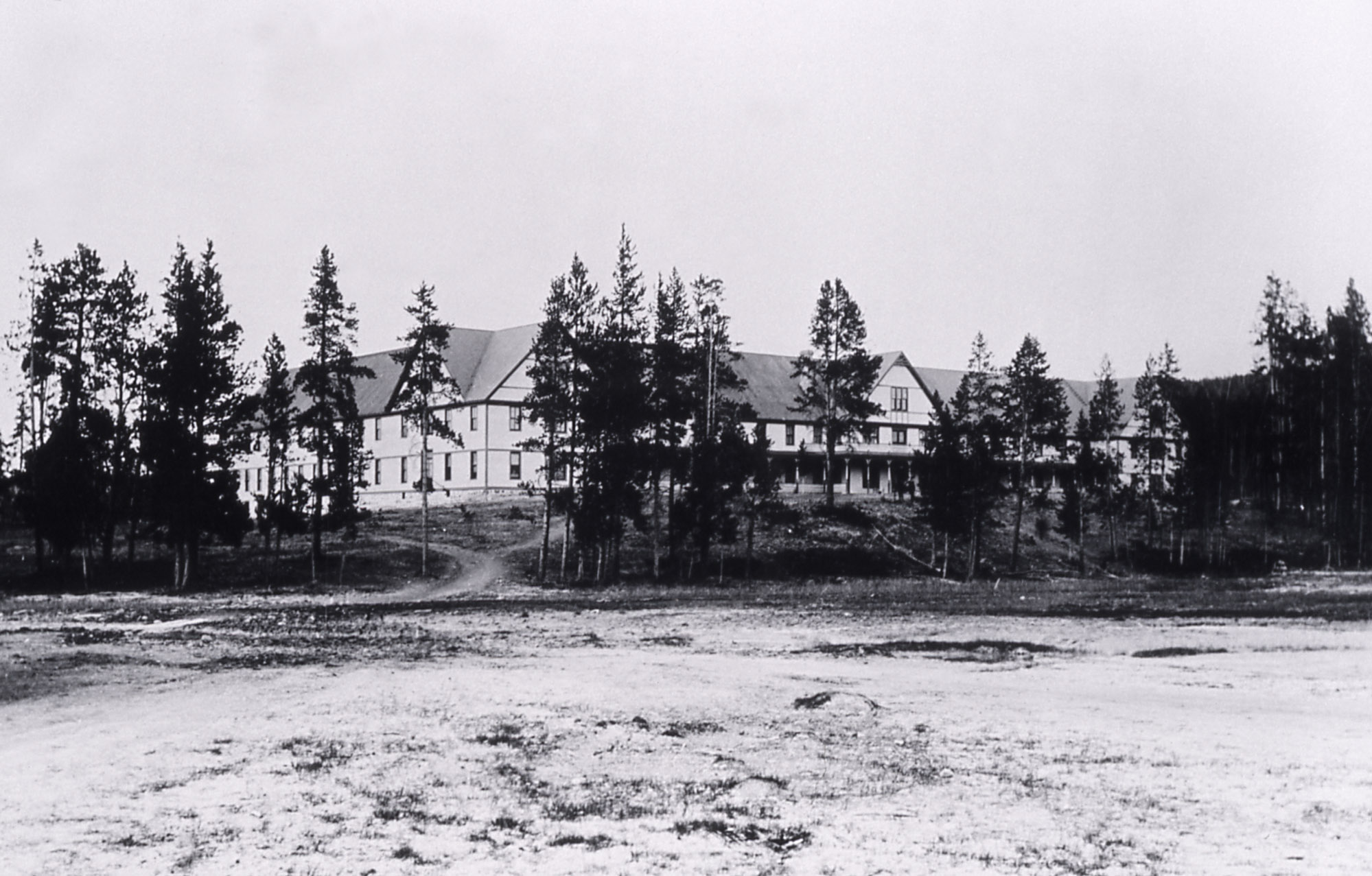
Fountain Hotel, ca 1910

- Marshall's Hotel, 1880–1891, built by George Marshall, later operated as the Firehole Hotel 44°34′39″N 110°49′49″W
- Fountain Hotel, 1891–1916, built by the Yellowstone Park Association near Fountain Paint Pots, 44°33′15″N 110°48′16″W

=== Upper Geyser Basin ===
- Old Faithful Inn, 1904 to present. Designed by Robert Reamer, 44°27′35″N 110°49′49″W
- Old Faithful Lodge, 1923–present, designed by architect Gilbert Stanley Underwood
- Old Faithful Snow Lodge
- Shack Hotel, 1885–1903, located at the present site of the Old Faithful Inn next to the Wylie Camp

=== Canyon ===
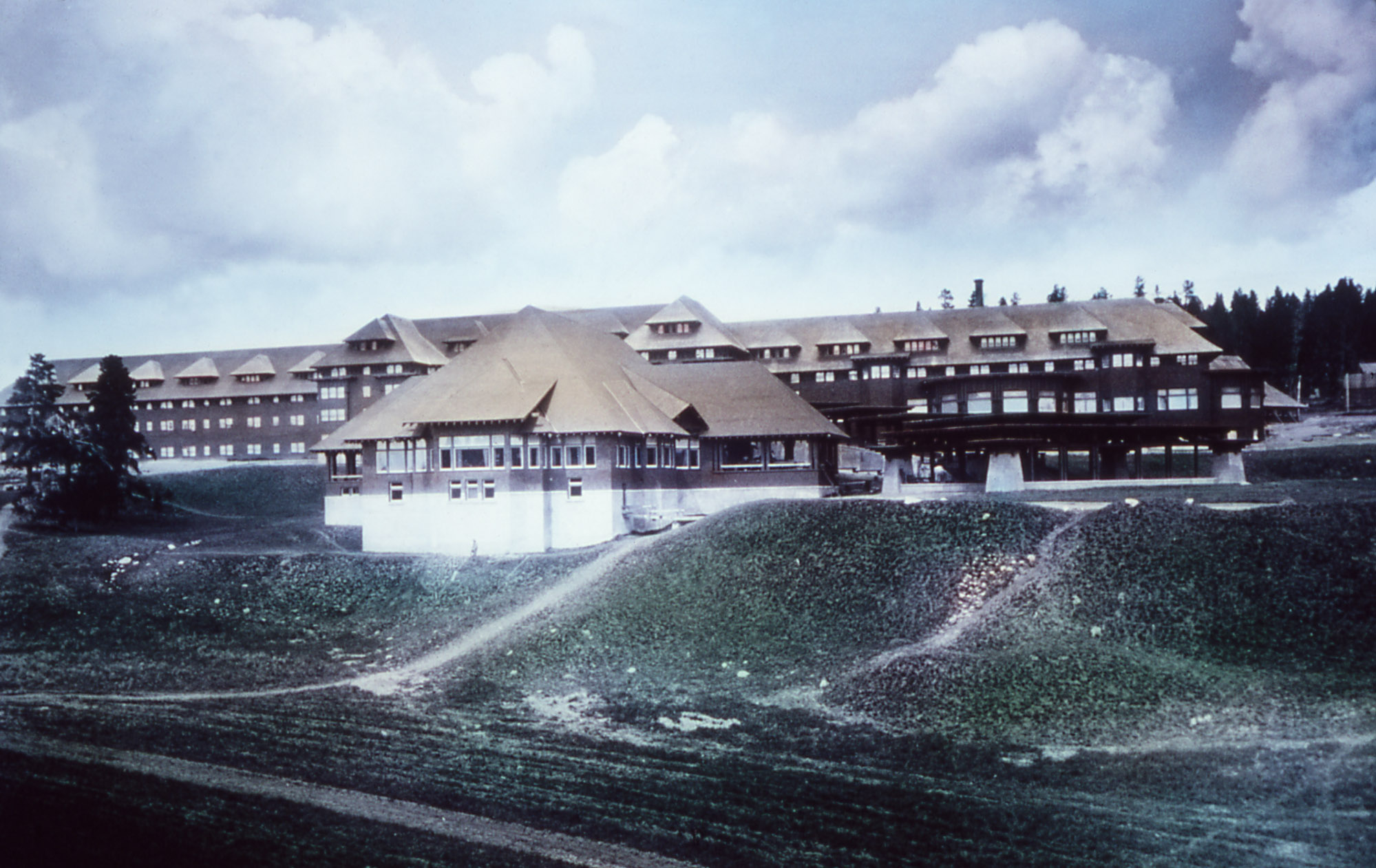
Third Canyon Hotel, ca 1912

- First Canyon Hotel, 1886–1891. Temporary structure.
- Second Canyon Hotel, 1891–1911. incorporated into the third Canyon Hotel. 44°43′24″N 110°29′56″W
- Third Canyon Hotel, 1911–1959. Designed by Robert Reamer. 44°43′24″N 110°29′56″W
- First Canyon Lodge, 1920's-1957. 44°42′54″N 110°29′42″W
- Second Canyon Lodge, 1958-Current. Mission 66 era structure. 44°44′03″N 110°29′23″W

=== Tower Roosevelt ===
- Yancey's Pleasant Valley Hotel, 1884–1903, operated by John F. Yancey, 44°55′46″N 110°25′17″W.
- Roosevelt Lodge, 1919 to present, 44°54′47″N 110°24′56″W

=== Lake ===
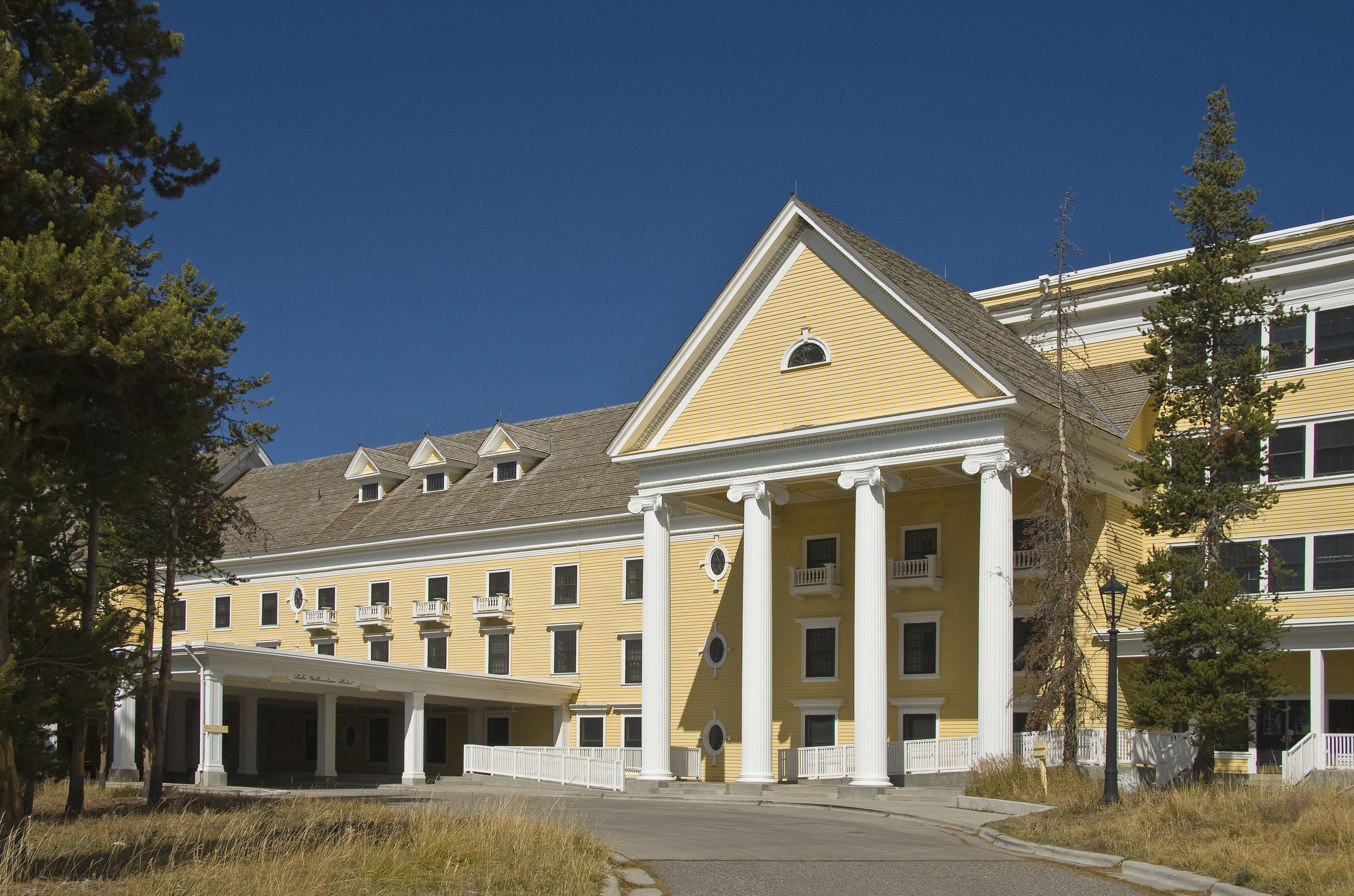
Lake Hotel, 2010

- Lake Hotel, 1891–present, 1903 adaptation and addition designed by Robert Reamer, 44°32′59″N 110°24′00″W
- Lake Lodge

=== West Thumb ===
- Grant Village

== Permanent Tourist Camps ==
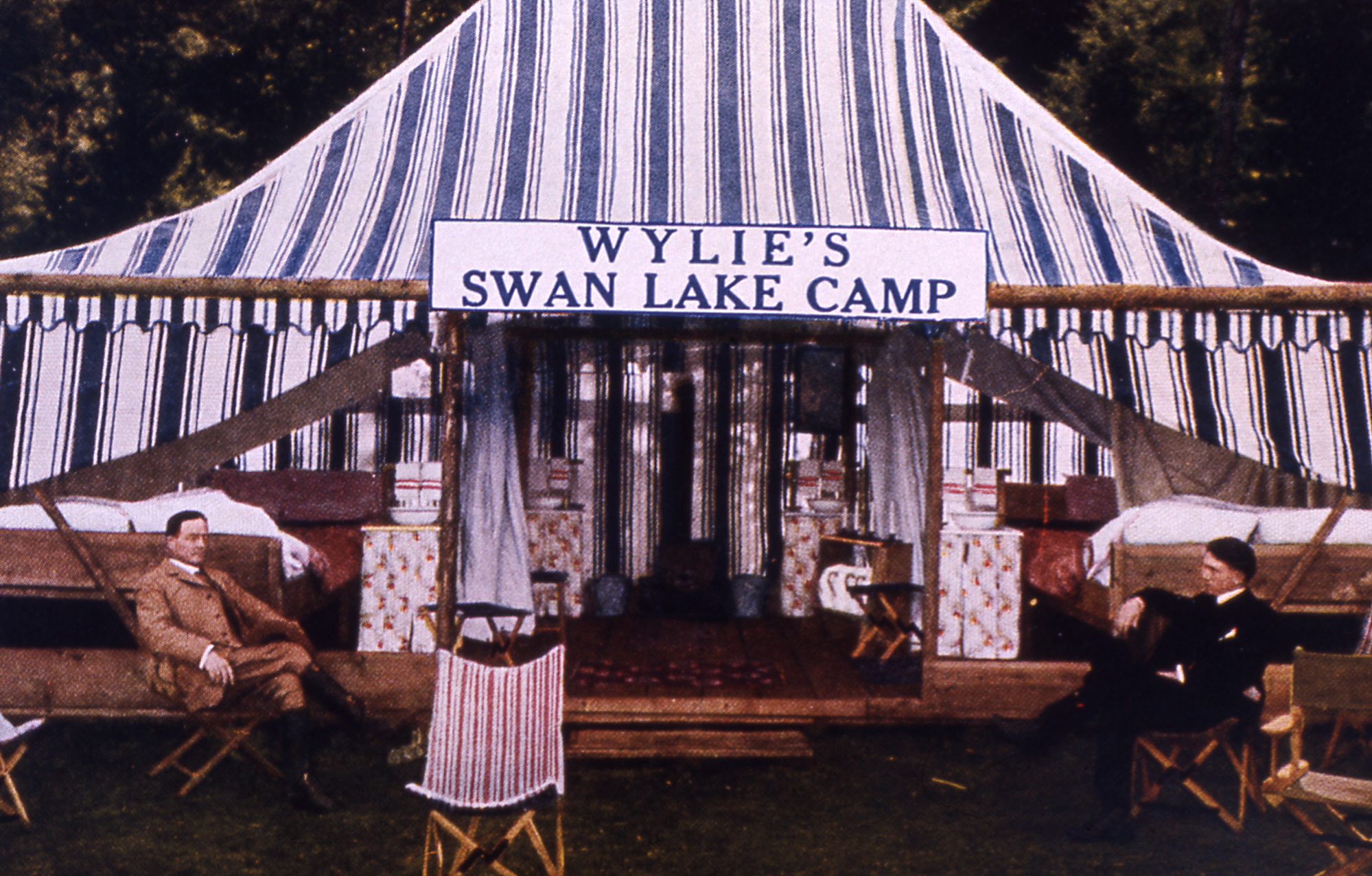
Wylie's Swan Lake, ca 1900

- Shaw and Powell Permanent Camping Company
  - Created by Amos Shaw and J. D. Powell, Shaw and Powell operated mobile camps on one year leases from the Department of Interior from 1898 until 1913 when they were granted a ten-year lease for seven permanent camps.
  - Locations at Shaw Powell Camp (Willow Park), Shaw Powell Camp (Gibbon Falls), Shaw Powell Camp (Nez Perce Creek), Shaw Powell Camp (Old Faithful), Shaw Powell Camp (Canyon), Shaw Powell Camp (Little Thumb Creek), Shaw Powell Camp (Bridge Bay)
- Wylie Camping Company
  - The Wylie Permanent Camping Company was created by William Wallace Wylie, a Bozeman, Montana school superintendent with a two-year lease in 1893.
  - The camps, nicknamed the Wylie Way were located at Wylie Camp (Lake), Wylie Camp (Lost Creek) (1906- precursor to Camp Roosevelt), Wylie Camp (Canyon), Wylie Camp (Old Faithful), Wylie Camp (Riverside), Wylie Camp (Sleepy Hollow), Wylie Camp (Swan Lake Flats)
