= Marshall's Hotel =

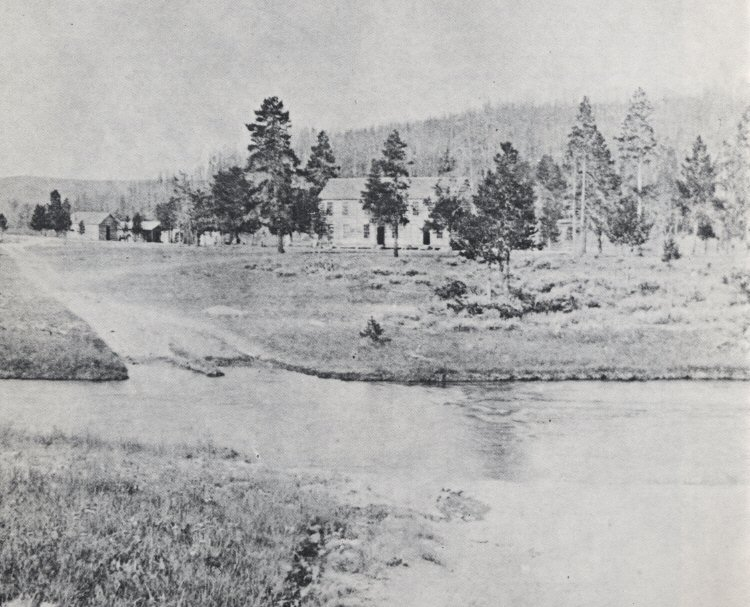
- Marshall's Hotel, 1884
- Interactive map of the Marshall's Hotel area

General information
- Location: Lower Geyser Basin, Yellowstone National Park, Teton County, Wyoming
- Coordinates: 44°34′39″N 110°49′49″W
- Opening: 1880
- Closed: 1891
- Owner: George W. Marshall

Technical details
- Floor count: 2

Marshall's Hotel, subsequently known as the Firehole Hotel was the first public accommodations built in the Firehole River geyser basins of Yellowstone National Park and among the earliest tourist hotels in Yellowstone. The first hotel was built in 1880 by George W. Marshall (1838-1917) and his partner John B. Goff and was located just west of confluence of the Firehole River and Nez Perce Creek. A second hotel, the Firehole Hotel, was built in 1884 in partnership with George Graham Henderson very near the present day Nez Perce Picnic area. The hotels operated for eleven years under various ownership ceasing operation in 1891. By 1895, all the structures except a few cabins associated with the two hotels had been razed.

== 1880-1884 ==
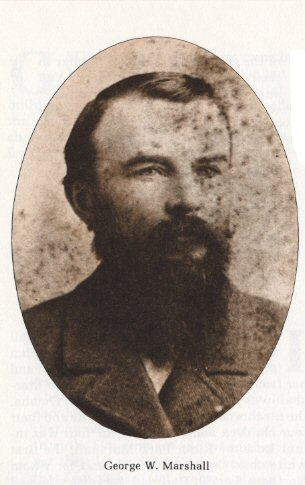
George W. Marshall

George Marshall had a U.S. government mail contract to carry mail from Virginia City, Montana to Mammoth Hot Springs in 1879. It was cancelled at the end of that year. The route from Virginia City to Mammoth took Marshall over the Madison Plateau on the Old Fountain Pack Trail (abandoned today). This trail passed right by the confluence of the Firehole River and Nez Perce Creek on its way to Mammoth. Upon losing his mail contract, Marshall chose to build a cabin on the Firehole River with the aim of servicing visitors to the park.

Carl Shurz [sic], Sec of Interior was out visiting the park in 80 and had to sleep out under the trees near my cabin one night it rained. He told me next morning I would have given twenty dollars $20.00 to have got into a house last night and suggested that I should prepare to keep travelers said that he would see I got a permit from the Government and when they got their leeses [sic] filed would see I got a leese [sic]. I remained on a permit til last year [1884] when Sec. of Interior granted me a lease for 10 yrs. My first year here I did not make anything, second year came out $180 dollars in debt.

— George Marshall, Biographical Statement, reported in Whittlesley (1885)

In the 1881 season, there were six rooms in the hotel, a lounge, a dining room, a kitchen and quarters for the Marshalls. There were two guest rooms. An 1881 visitor described the hotel thus:

... the hum of voices filled the apartment, everyone feeling at home and at perfect eas in regular Western frontier style--one man as good as another, whether hostler or millionaire. In one corner a couple were having a friendly game of cards; in another, guns and pistols were being cleaned and oiled, two or three men were buying provisions; others were indulging in poor beer at seventy-five cents a quart bottle, and around the stove a dozen or more were engaged in general conversation about the Park and the geysers.

— Bernard Leckler, An American Camping Trip to the Yellowstone National Park, The American Field, February 9, 1884

== 1885 ==
In May 1885, Marshall (age 39) and his wife Sarah decided to sell out. With four children having spent four seasons, including four winters in Yellowstone, he sold his interest in the hotel to his partner George Graham Henderson. Henderson had partnered with Henry Klamer, the son-in-law of George L. Henderson (no relation) the owner of the Cottage Hotel at Mammoth Hot Springs. Klamer would later be the owner of the Old Faithful store that is now known as the Lower Hamilton Store. Once Henderson and Klamer owned the property, they renamed it The Firehole Hotel.

== 1886-1891 ==
In 1886, through a series of ownership transfers, the hotel became the property of the Yellowstone Park Association, owned by Charles Gibson. The Association was becoming the preeminent concessionaire in the park at the time. They were building the Mammoth Hotel (completed in 1886), operated tent hotels at Norris and Canyon, and eventually completed the first Canyon Hotel in 1890. Park visitation was increasing every year and these hotels—Mammoth and Canyon were setting a new standard; one that Marshall's could not meet. In 1886, the U.S. Army took charge of Yellowstone, and then military superintendent Captain Moses Harris began a campaign to rid the park of this particular hotel. In official reports he wrote:

... a hotel building of limited capacity and rude construction, and two cottages used in connection with it (1886). ... needlessly ugly in architectural design, resembling nothing more so much as section houses of a railroad ... All the buildings at this place are of poor and mean construction. (1887)

— Captain Moses Harris, Military Superintendent of Yellowstone National Park, Official reports 1886, 1887

Unfavorable accounts from visitors such as this one did not help the hotel:

The hotel was primative [sic], being an unfinished log-hut, the daylight peering through every plank. My room was about six feet square sufficiently filled with two beds. It boasted neither drawers nor a table and a door that declined to shut. The walls were stretched over with canvas. It could not be described as luxurious and every snore was audible.

— O.S.T Drake, A Lady's Trip to Yellowstone Park, Every Girl's Annual, London, 1887

The location of Marshall's was fully a 1 mile (1.6 km) away from the nearest geysers and plans were being made for bigger and better hotels at Lake Hotel and at the Fountain Paint Pots. Army administration of the park had allowed significant improvement of the park's road system and travel time between attractions were significantly shorter than a decade previous. The Yellowstone Park Association constructed the significantly larger and more luxurious Fountain Hotel very near Fountain Paint Pots in 1890 and opened it in the spring of 1891. By June 1891, all the old Marshall or Firehole Hotel properties had been vacated and operations transferred to the Fountain Hotel. The Fountain Hotel operated until 1916. Most of the older Marshall buildings were burned in 1891, but a few survived until 1895 when the Firehole Hotel itself was razed.

== Notable visitors and events ==
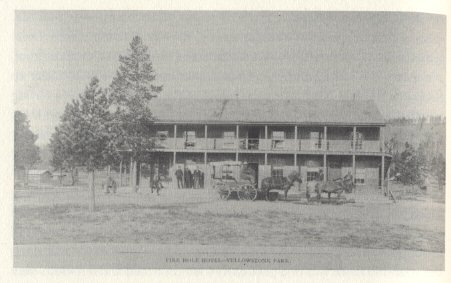
Firehole Hotel, 1885

- In September 1885, the son of General Oliver O. Howard of the Nez Perce War of 1877, 19-year-old John Howard was visiting the park with his brother James, General Howard, his wife and John's fiancee, a Miss Chase. During their stay at Marshall's, James and John got in a very heated argument over Miss Chase. After another argument with Miss Chase herself, John Howard attempted suicide by shooting himself in the chest. He survived and convalesced in the hotel, but the incident made two separate editions of the Livingston Enterprise.
- Known to have stayed at the hotel in 1881 were Wyoming Territorial Governor John W. Hoyt and then Senator Benjamin Harrison (later the 23rd President of the United States).
- Sarah and George Marshall's fourth child Rosa Park Marshall was born at the hotel on January 31, 1881. Rosa Marshall is purportedly the first white child born in the park. Northern Pacific Railway surveyors working is North Dakota in 1882 named Rosa Lake 48°50′14″N 097°45′09″W, a small lake near Cavalier, ND in her honor.
- During the 1884 season, noted naturalist, George Bird Grinnell visited Marshall's and later wrote the following in Forest and Stream about the site as he approached from the west:

The scene in the valley below [Fountain Flats] is one of life and activity. Horses and cattle are browsing on the flat. Mounted men dash hither and thither on their nimble steeds. Two or three stages move briskly along the roads. Heavy wagons laden with trunks, provisions and bedding stand by tents, about which move numbers of people. Men are chopping wood, building fires, or hobbling and picketing out their horses. There are houses--one, two, three, a dozen. It is the old spot, but how changed by the lapse of a few years. When I last looked upon it, it was as silent and untenanted as if never trodden by the foot of man, and now it is a settlement.

— George Bird Grinnell, Field and Stream, January 1885

- In 1886, Charles Warren Stoddard

== Mattie Culver grave ==
One of the few marked graves in Yellowstone outside of the Mammoth Hot Springs area is that of Mattie S. Culver, age 30, who died of tuberculosis at the hotel on March 2, 1889. Mrs. Culver was the wife of the hotel's winter keeper, E. C. Culver. Because of frozen ground at the time, Culver's body was stored in two end-to-end barrels outside the hotel until spring. Adelaide Child, the wife of the Yellowstone Park Improvement Company president Harry W. Child, ensured a proper burial, memorial and fenced in tombstone near the hotel. The grave is visible today a few 100 feet (30 m) west of the Nez Perce Picnic Area.

== Gallery ==
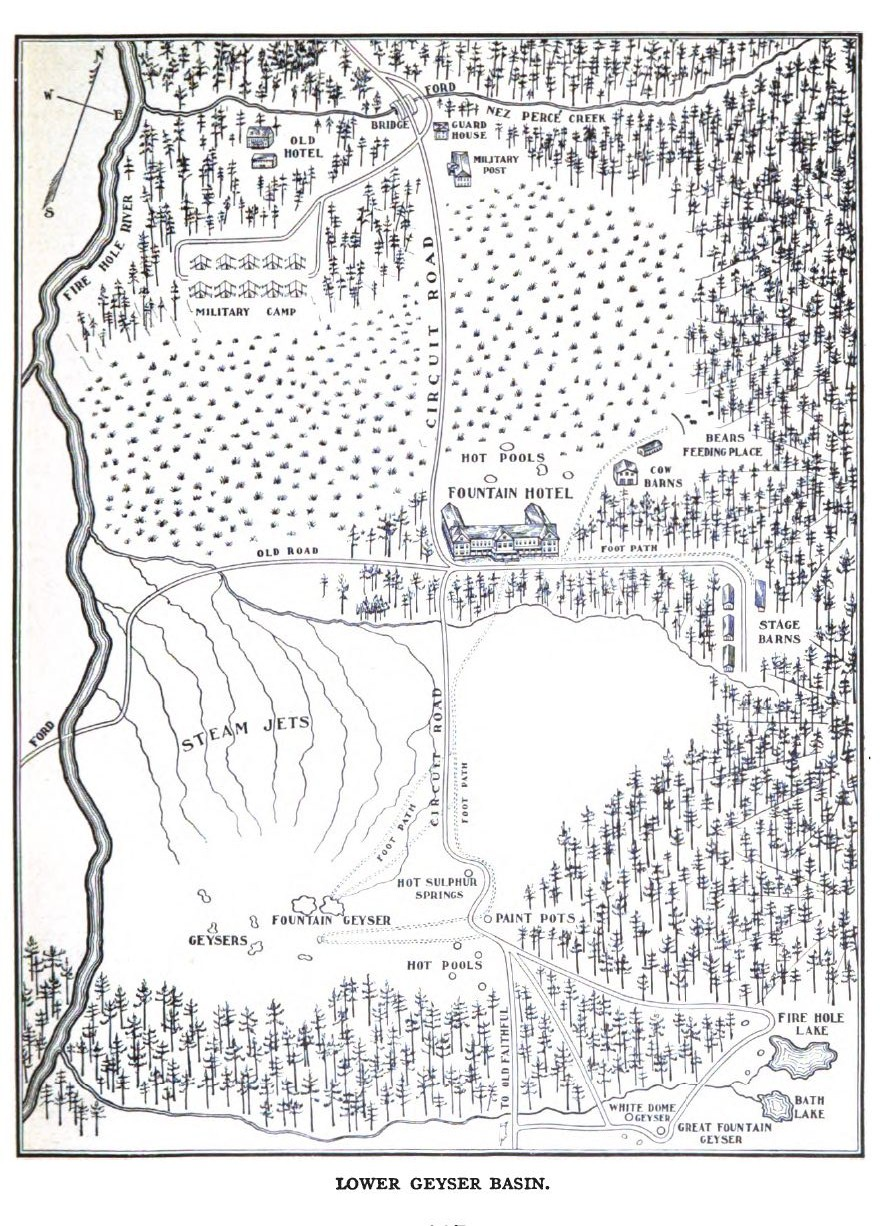
1909 map showing location of Marshall's Hotel (Old Hotel) at top left

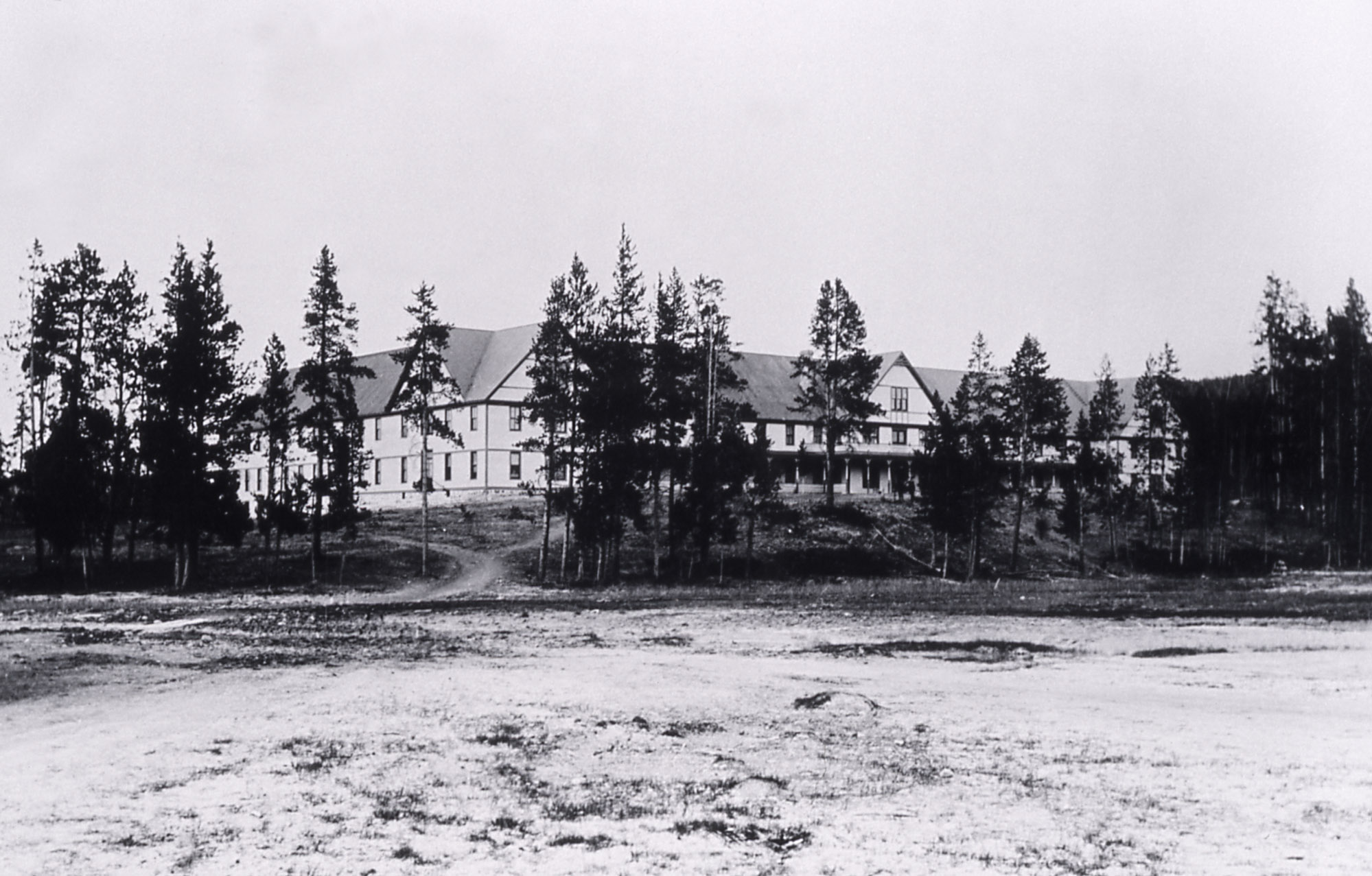
Fountain Hotel, cc 1910 Frank Jay Haynes

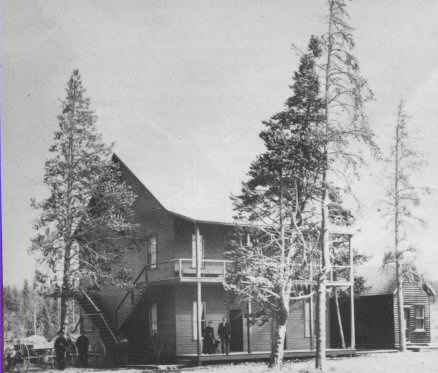
Marshall's, 1887

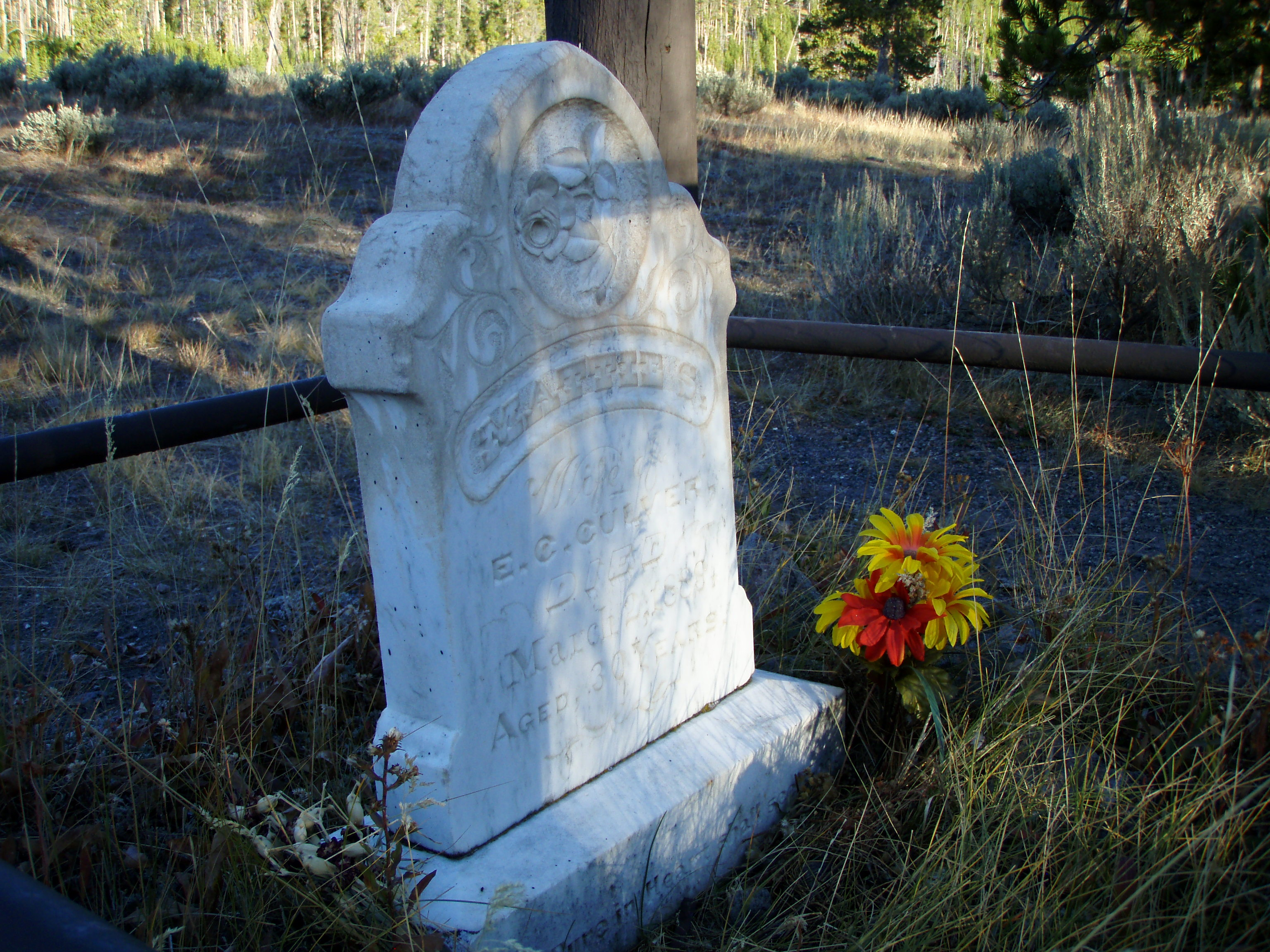
Mattie Culver's gravestone near the confluence of Nez Perce Creek and the Firehole River

== See also ==
- Old Faithful Inn
- Lake Hotel
