= Old Faithful Lodge =

- U.S. Historic district – Contributing property
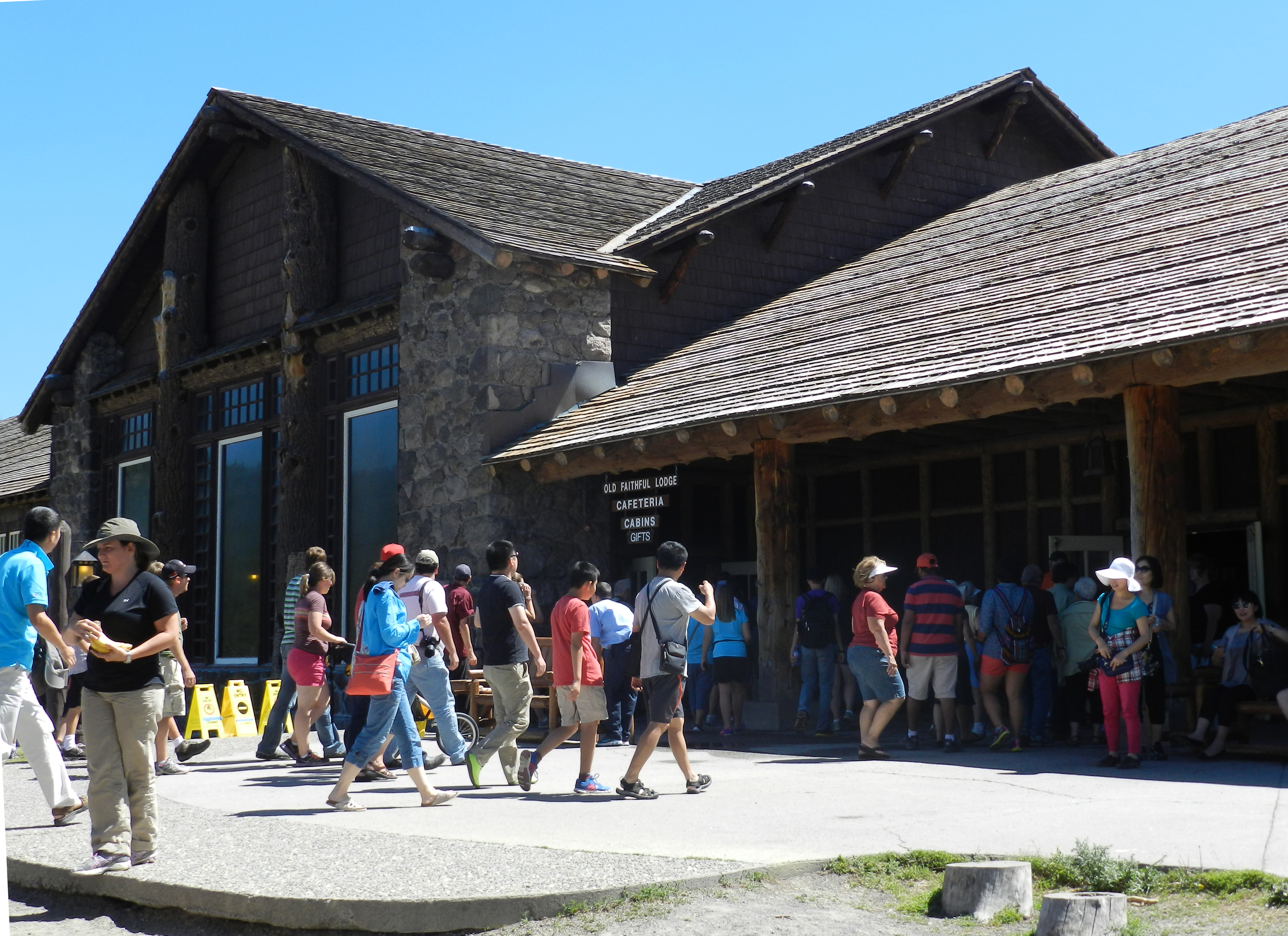
- Main entrance, Old Faithful Lodge

- Location within Wyoming Location within the United States
- Coordinates: 44°27′34.3″N 110°49′33.8″W
- Built: 1923
- Architect: Underwood, Gilbert Stanley

Old Faithful Lodge in Yellowstone National Park is located opposite the more famous Old Faithful Inn, facing Old Faithful geyser. The Lodge was built as a series of detached buildings through 1923 and was consolidated into one complex by architect Gilbert Stanley Underwood in 1926-27. The Lodge is included in the Old Faithful Historic District.

Compared with the Inn, which is a full-service hotel, the Lodge provides only dining, social, administrative and registration services for lodgers, who are accommodated in detached cabins surrounding the Lodge. Several earlier buildings were consolidated by Underwood into the single rambling structure, with the help of National Park Service architect Daniel Ray Hull, in 1926-27.

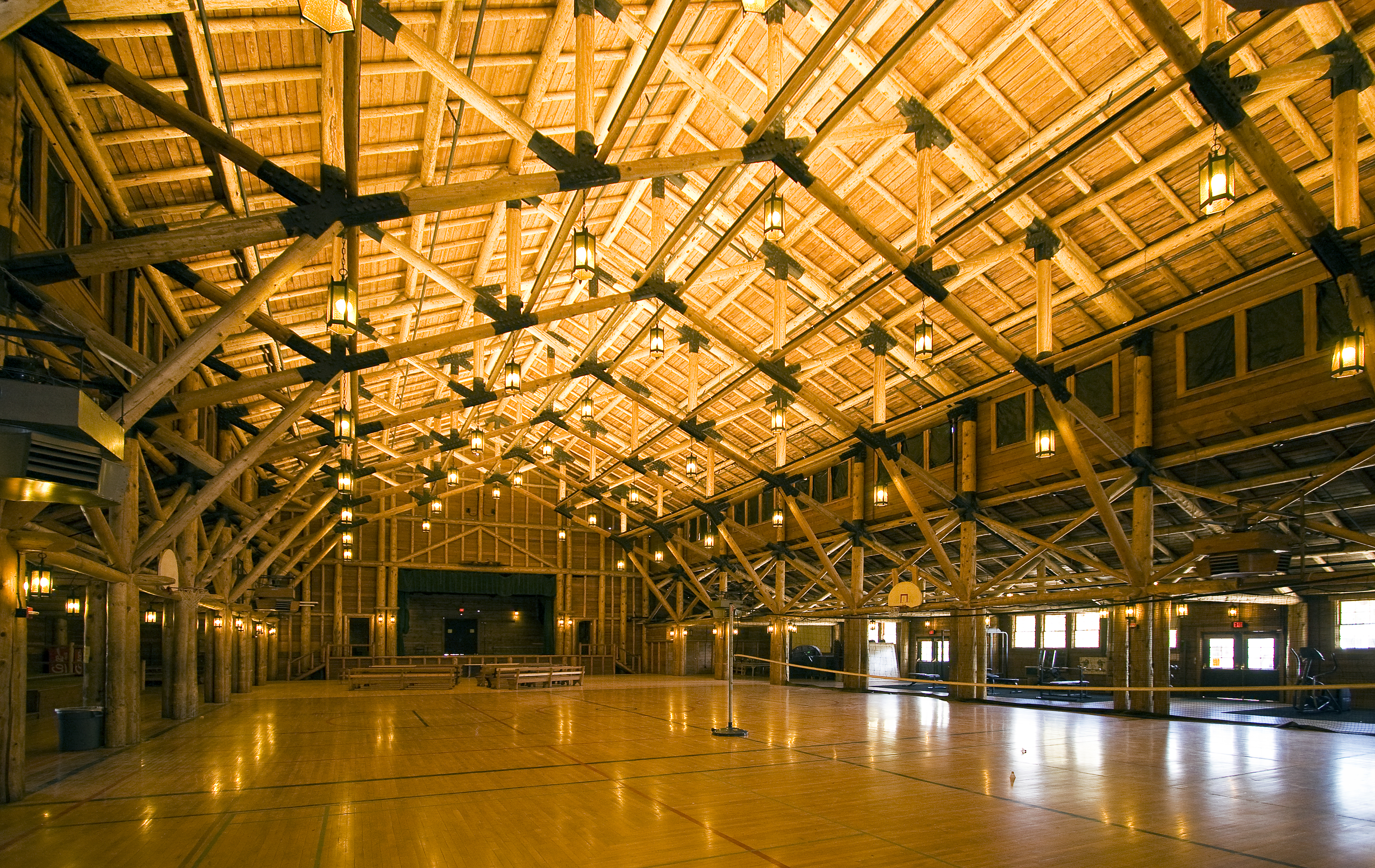
Geyser Hall, Old Faithful Lodge

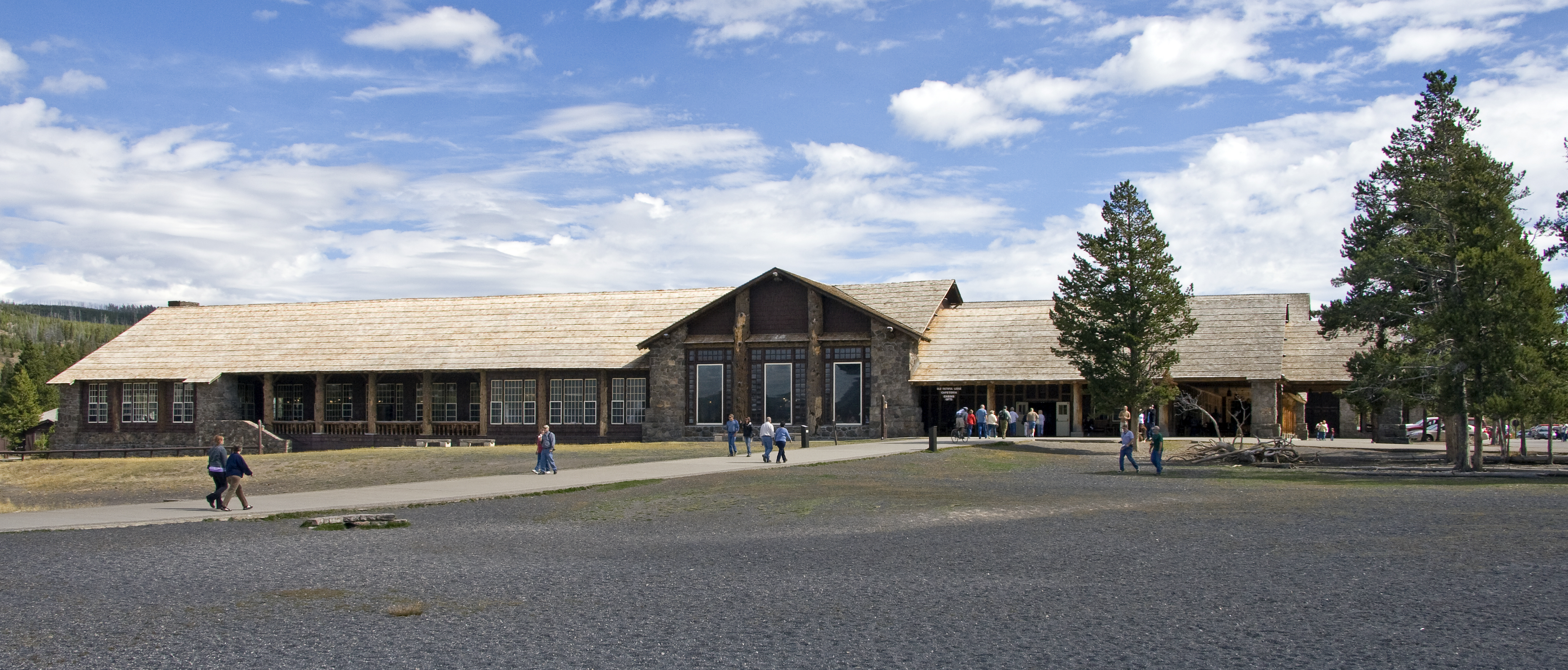
Old Faithful side of the Lodge

The Lodge includes a common lobby, dining spaces and a recreation hall, known as Geyser Hall, of log construction in the National Park Service Rustic style. The roof structure of the 136-foot (41 m) by 100-foot (30 m) Geyser Hall is reminiscent of Gothic wood construction, with a height of 73 feet (22 m) to the ridge. The hall is arranged with a central nave-like structure, with subsidiary side aisles.

Accommodations are located behind and to the east of the lodge in "frontier cabins" with en-suite toilets and "budget cabins" with communal toilets and showers. The lodge and cabins are open during the summer season. The cabins are descendants of the original tent camps established by the Shaw and Powell Camping Company in 1913-1915. From 1919 the camp was operated by several owners under the Yellowstone Park Camps Company. Concurrent with the construction of the consolidated Old Faithful Lodge, the camp was acquired by Harry W. Child in 1928 and renamed the Yellowstone Park Lodges & Camps Company. This company was amalgamated with Child's Yellowstone Park Company in 1936.
