= Canyon Hotel =

Former hotel building in Park County, Wyoming, United States

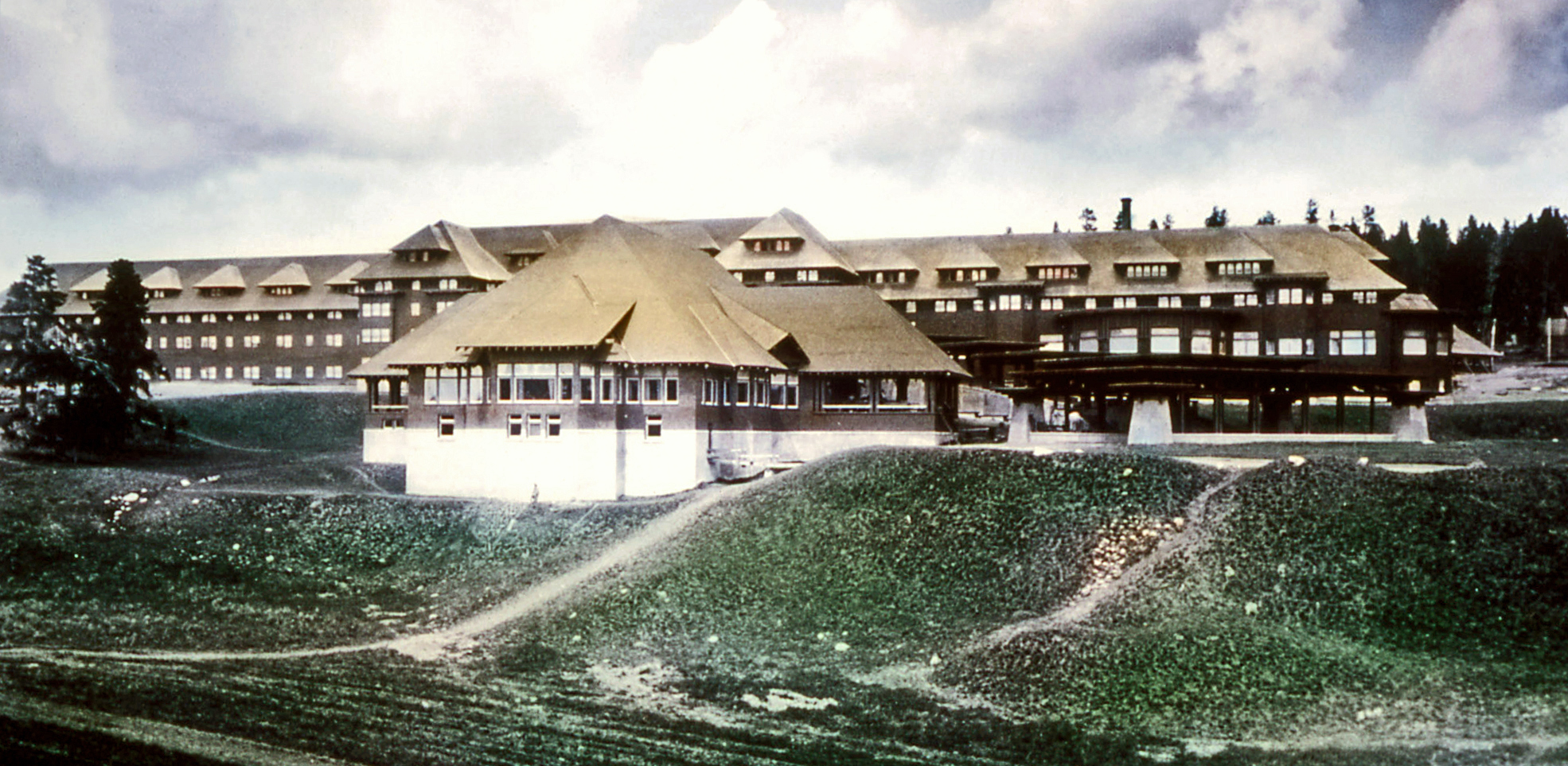
- Canyon Hotel, circa 1911
- Interactive map of the Canyon Hotel area

General information
- Location: Canyon, Yellowstone National Park, Park County, Wyoming
- Coordinates: 44°43′24″N 110°29′56″W
- Opening: 1886 (1st hotel)
- Closed: 1959 (3rd hotel)

Design and construction
- Developer: Yellowstone Park Company

The Canyon Hotel was built in Yellowstone National Park in 1910 by the Yellowstone Park Company to accommodate visitors to the area of the Grand Canyon of the Yellowstone and Yellowstone Falls. The hotel was built on a huge scale, with a perimeter measurement of one mile. Situated on a hill to the west of the falls, it dominated the landscape. It had an elegant resort-like air when first built. After World War II it was regarded by the National Park Service as outdated. Suffering from neglect, it was abandoned in the late 1950s and was in the process of demolition when it was destroyed by fire in 1960.

== Temporary hotel ==
The Canyon Hotel was one of four major hotels operated by the Yellowstone Park Company in the early and mid twentieth century in Yellowstone. The company operated a circuit tour of Yellowstone, featuring stops at the Mammoth Hotel, the Old Faithful Inn, the Lake Hotel and the Canyon Hotel, taking about five days for the complete tour. There were three successive hotels at the Canyon site. The first hotel was built by the Yellowstone Park Association, a predecessor to the Yellowstone Park Company, opening in May 1886. The prefabricated structure was intended to be a temporary replacement for a tent camping accommodation. This hotel was placed close to the Upper Falls. By agreement with the Department of the Interior, the building was to serve a single season and was to be demolished in August 1886, when construction was to start on a permanent hotel. A sawmill was built and timber was cut and sawn, but no work on the hotel took place until 1889.

== Second Canyon Hotel ==
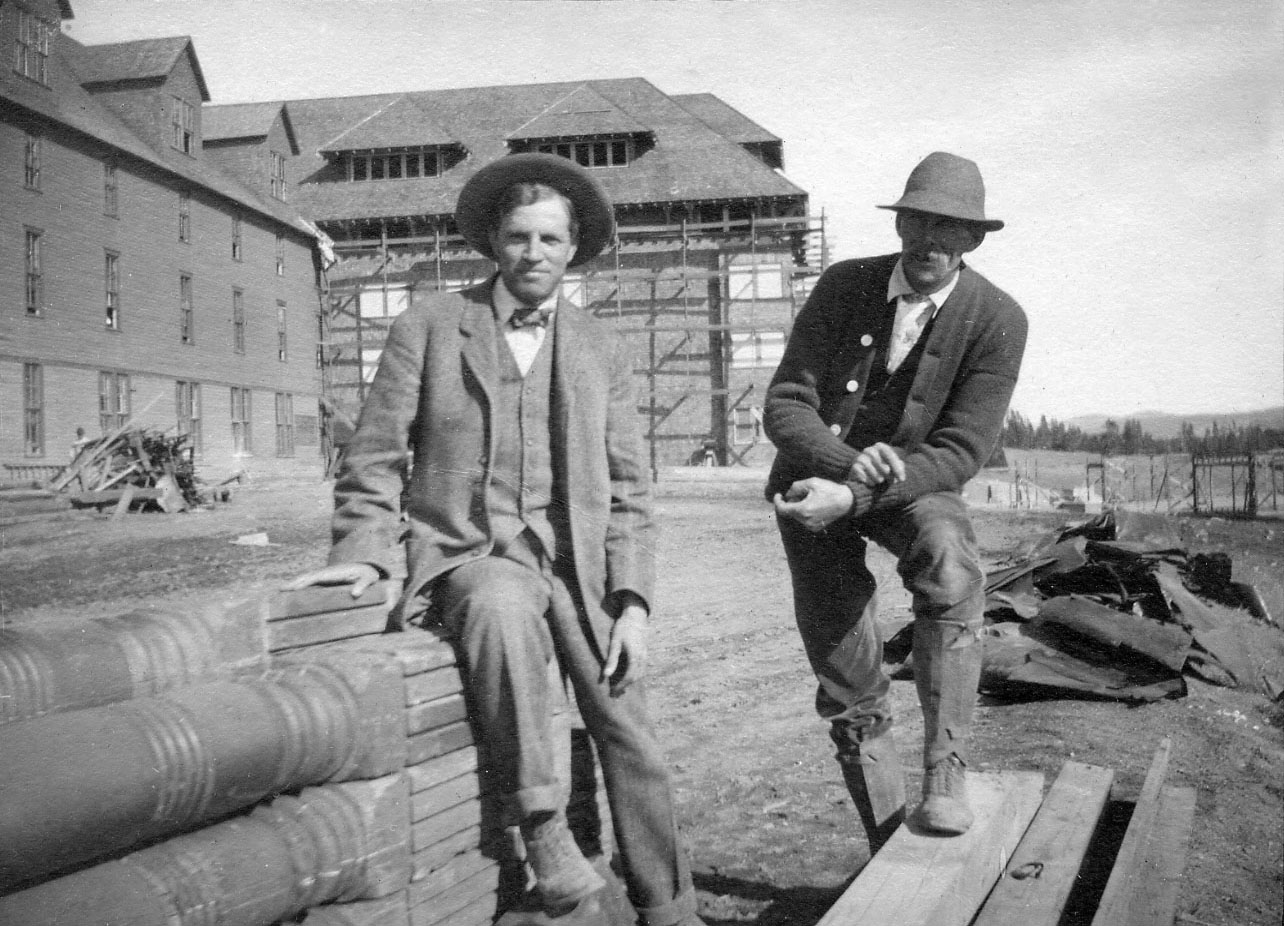
Architect Robert Reamer (left) and the construction foreman, Mr. George, at the Canyon Hotel during construction in October 1910. The second hotel, incorporated into the new hotel, is visible at left

The new hotel was built about 4,000 feet (1,200 m) south of the present Canyon Junction. The site was an east-facing meadow on a prominent hillside overlooking the road. The building, when completed in 1891, was called by the park superintendent "a most unsightly edifice." The hotel compensated for its unattractive appearance by offering a high standard of comfort and service.

This second hotel was a plain three-story wood-framed building with an entrance porch on the long dimension of the building. The 250-room hotel was enlarged with twenty-four more rooms in 1901, when dormers were added to the roof. Foundation troubles, discovered during the original construction, required that rooms in the original section be replastered during the 1901 work.

== Third Canyon Hotel ==
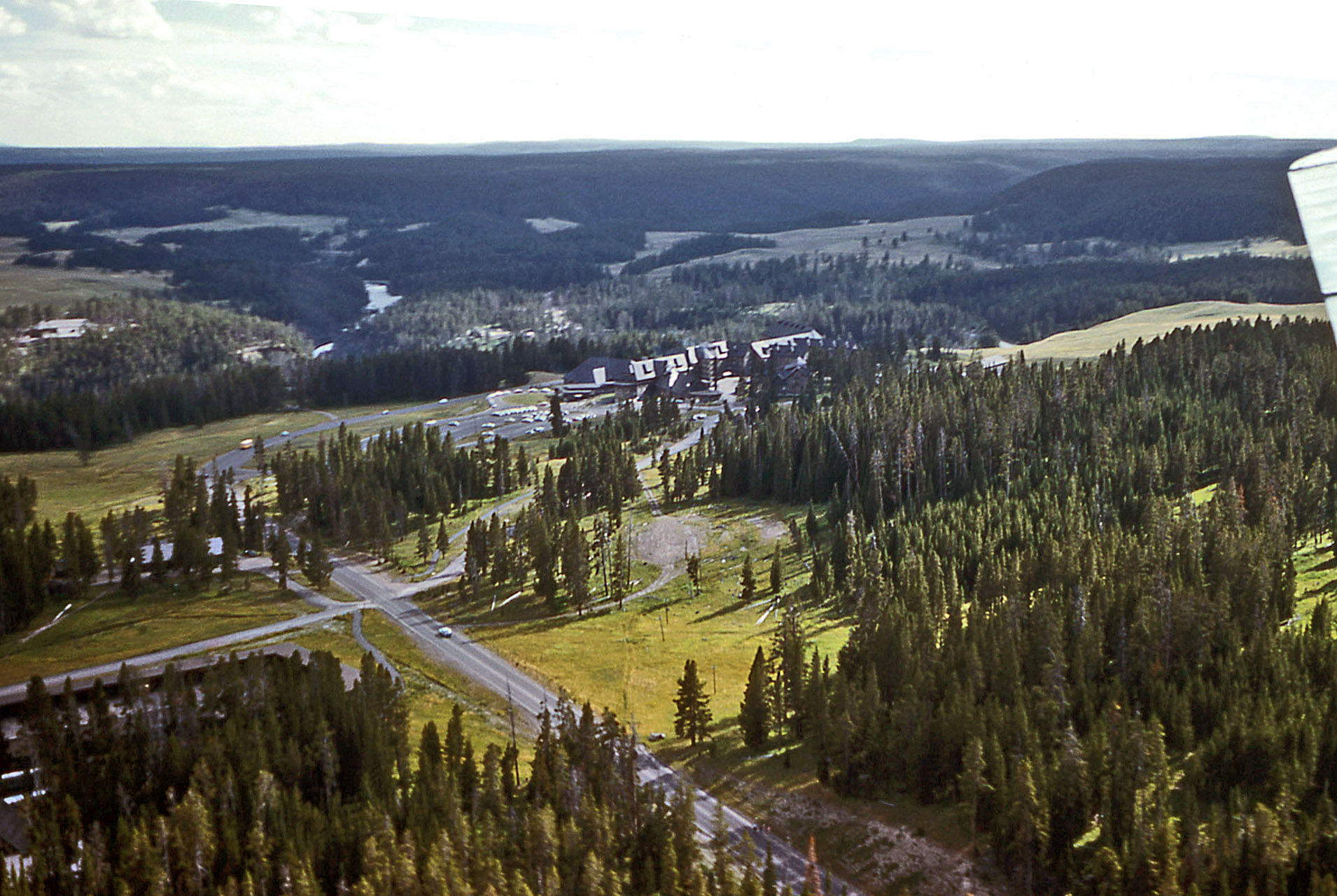
Aerial view of the Canyon Hotel in 1958

The third hotel was designed by architect Robert Reamer, a close friend of Yellowstone Park Company president Harry W. Child, who had designed the Old Faithful Inn and a renovation of the Lake Hotel in 1903. Reamer and the Childs had together taken a grand tour of Europe in 1909, and at Child's direction Reamer set out to design an elegant accommodation, in contrast to the rustic Old Faithful Inn. Reamer, assisted by Charles A. Popkin, incorporated the old hotel into the new design, but changed its character completely to a long, horizontal structure that flowed along the hillside, anchored by a heavy hipped roof accented by prominent hipped dormers. The new hotel comprised 400 rooms with 100 baths, and measured 750 feet (230 m) in length making it the largest building ever built in Yellowstone. Construction started in June 1910, and the hotel was already enclosed by October. Nearly all exterior work was completed by December, and work continued on the interior through the winter. The partially complete hotel opened for guests in June 1911, with the grand opening held on August 2, 1911.

The hotel showed clear influences of Frank Lloyd Wright's Prairie School with its horizontal lines and dominating roof. The interior made generous use of sturdy pilasters and exposed timber roof framing, with interior spaces following the slope of the hill down to the massive porte-cochere entrance. The lounge, located to one side of the sloped entrance structure, measured 100 feet (30 m) by 200 feet (61 m), featured views through panoramic windows from an elegant, sheltered space, and was overlooked by viewing platforms and bandstands within.

In 1936 the Old Faithful Inn and Canyon Hotel advertised rates of $2.75 per day without meals in a single person room, ranging upwards to $9 per day for a single room with attached bath and meals. The basement featured a notable wine cellar, bowling alleys and billiard rooms, as well as meeting and banquet rooms.

== Mission 66 ==
Following World War II, National Park Service facilities were in a state of poor repair and were incapable of accommodating the floods of automobile-borne tourists that patronized the national parks in the 1950s. The Mission 66 program was proposed as a Service-wide program to improve or replace visitor accommodations, transportation systems, interpretive facilities and park infrastructure in time for the 50th anniversary of the National Park Service in 1966. One feature of the program was the de-emphasis of park hotels, which were built with railroad-borne tourists in mind, in favor of motel-style accommodations that catered specifically to visitors arriving in automobiles. The Yellowstone master plan stated that

New hotels shall not be proposed. Present hotels should be placed into disuse and ultimately removed as they deteriorate and become marginal in income."

As the chief park concessioner, the Yellowstone Park Company was required to participate in the construction of new facilities to these new standards. The chief new development in Yellowstone was to be Canyon Village, one of the biggest such projects of Mission 66. The all-new community to the east of the hotel included a visitor center, shopping, service station and amphitheater. Visitor accommodations were centered on 500 motel-style units in a series of individual buildings of twenty or so rooms, centering on a new common lodge building. The complex included new housing for park employees, and when full, could accommodate almost five thousand visitors and employees.

Ground was broken for Canyon Village on June 25, 1956, with completion late in the summer of 1957. It became immediately apparent that visitors preferred the Canyon Hotel to the new facilities. The Yellowstone Park Company, in financial difficulty as a result of its contributions to the Mission 66 projects, partially closed the hotel to encourage visitors to stay at Canyon Village, closing it entirely for the 1959 season.

== Decline and destruction ==
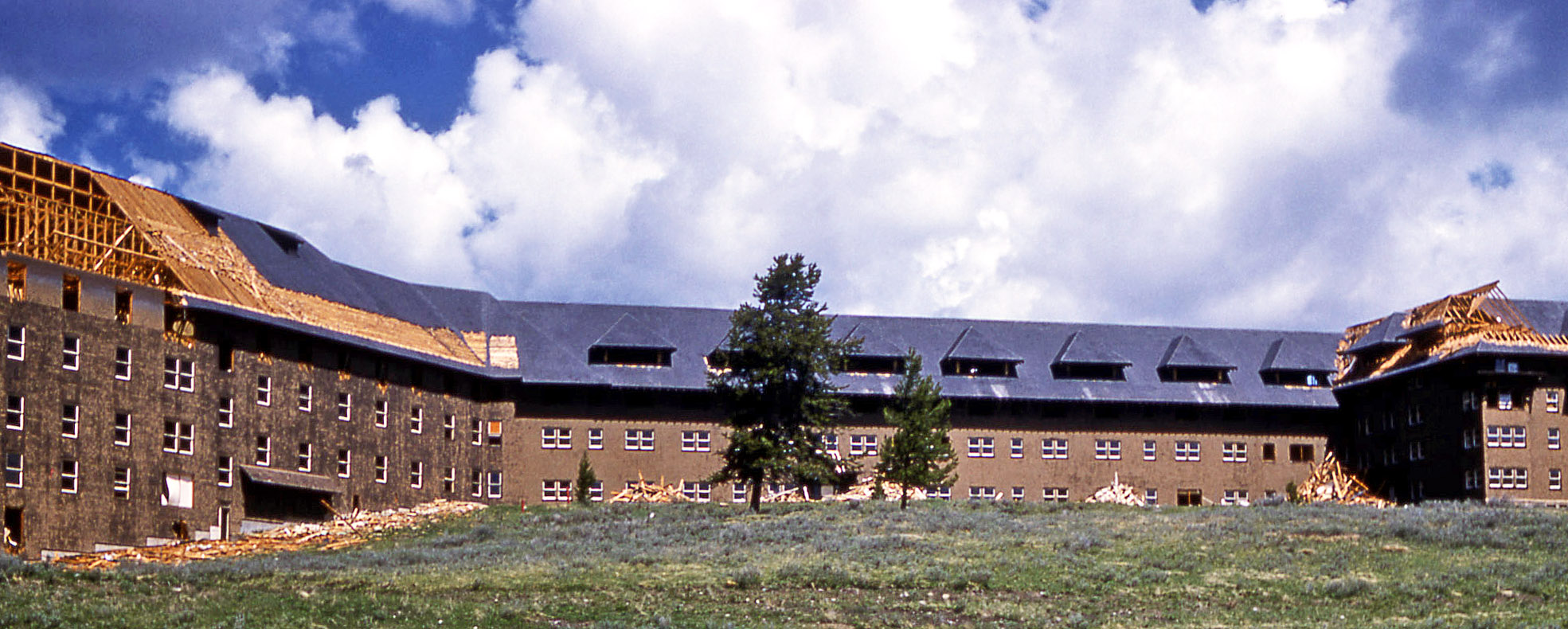
Demolition of the Canyon Hotel 1960

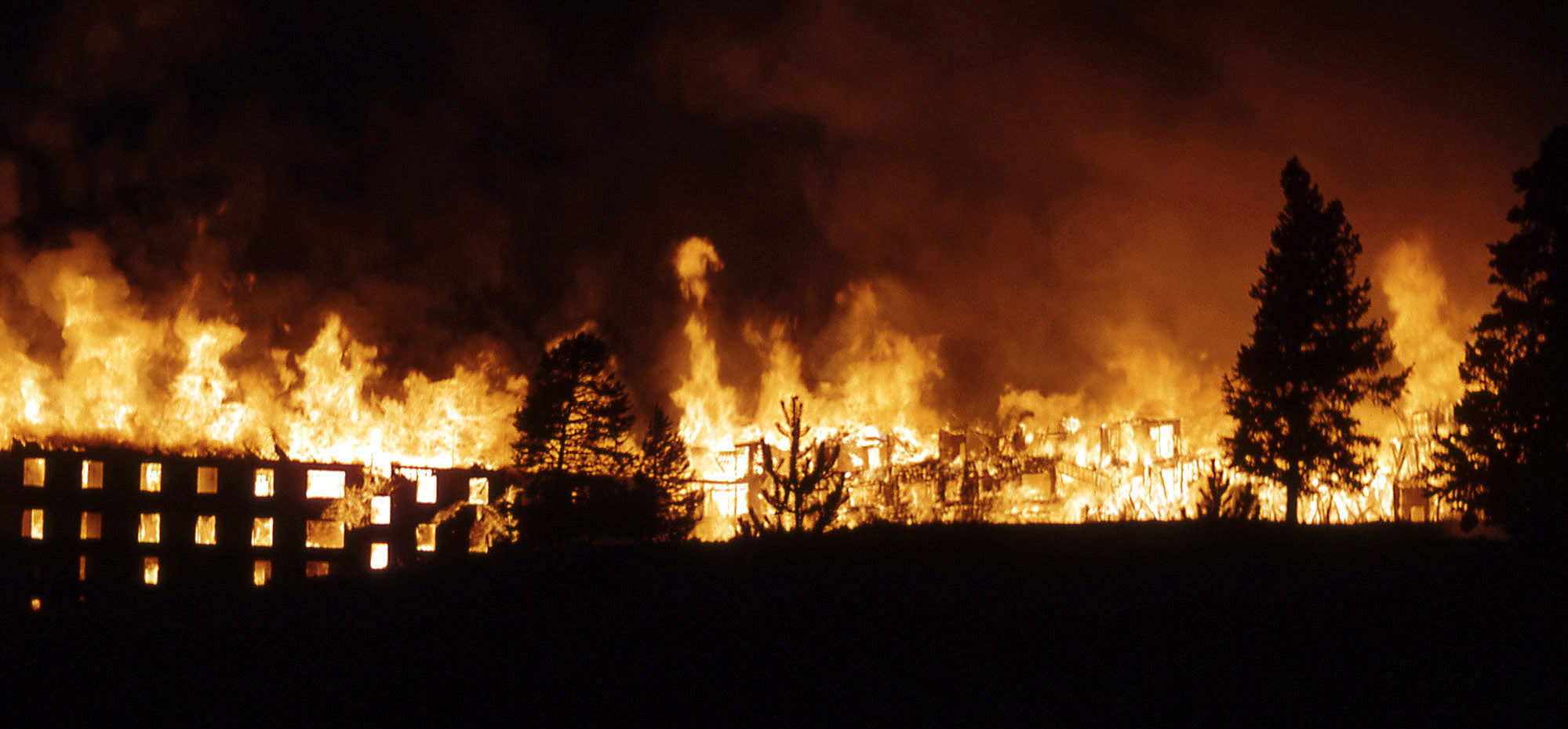
Canyon Hotel on fire, August 8/9, 1960, 2:00 AM

In 1957 Lemuel Garrison, who had been chairman of the Mission 66 steering committee, became superintendent of Yellowstone. In 1958 Garrison noted that a portion of the hotel was beyond repair, with uncorrected foundation issues dating to the 1891 building. Garrison speculated that some portion of the hotel could be stabilized, or that the most impressive portions might be moved and incorporated into the Canyon Village development. Garrison ultimately decided to demolish the hotel in 1959, with planning for the demolition starting in June 1959. After some debate about the possibility of moving some portions of the hotel to Lake, the Carlos Construction Company of Cody, Wyoming was awarded the demolition contract for a $25 bid. Carlos was given 900 days to remove the hotel.

On August 17, 1959, the 1959 Hebgen Lake earthquake hit Yellowstone, damaging facilities throughout the park. While the quake has been cited as a rationale for the hotel's demolition, it is clear that the decision to demolish had already been made and implemented.

The hotel burned to the ground the night of August 8, 1960. No cause has ever been assigned to the fire.

== Sources ==
- Barringer, Mark Daniel. Selling Yellowstone: Capitalism and the Construction of Nature, Lawrence, Kansas: University Press of Kansas, 2002. ISBN 978-0-7006-1167-6
- Haines, Aubrey L. The Yellowstone Story: A History of Our First National Park, Niwot, Colorado: University Press of Colorado, 1996. ISBN 0-87081-391-9
- Quinn, Ruth. Weaver of Dreams: The Life and Architecture of Robert C. Reamer, Gardiner, Montana: Leslie & Ruth Quinn, 2004. ISBN 0-9760945-0-9
