= Harry W. Child =

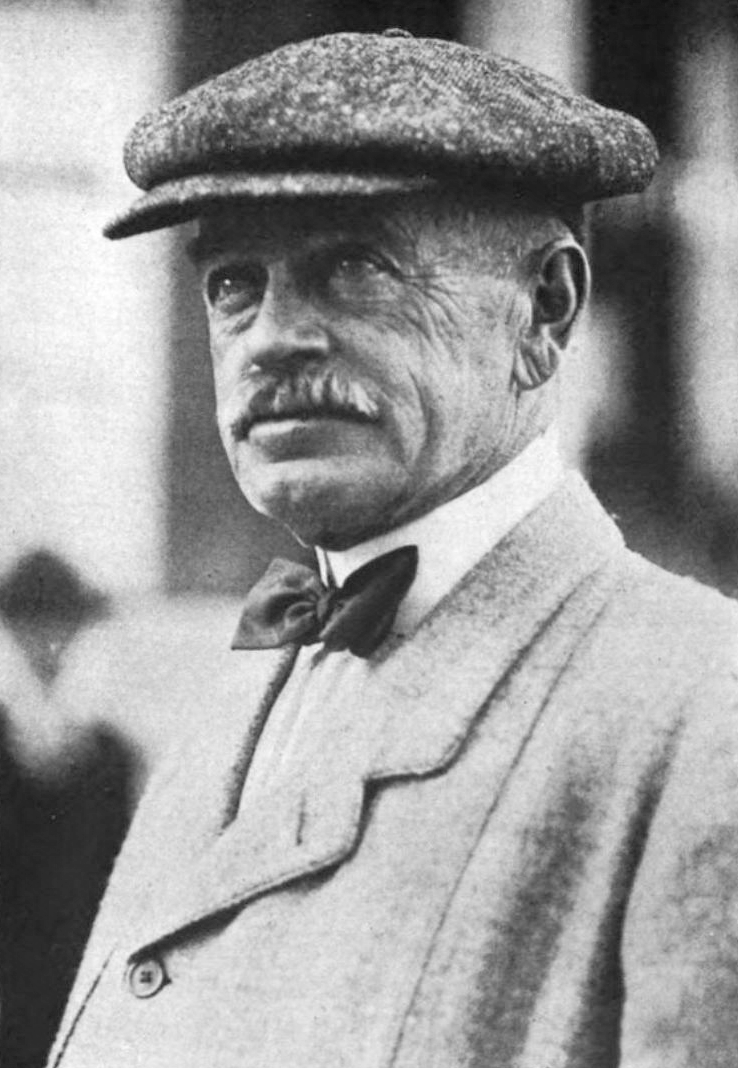
- Born: 1857; San Francisco, California, US
- Died: February 4, 1931 (aged 74); La Jolla, California, US
- Occupation: Entrepreneur
- Spouse: Adelaide Dean (m. 1883)

Harry W. Child (1857–1931) was an entrepreneur who managed development and ranching companies in southern Montana. He was most notable as a founder and longtime president of the Yellowstone Park Company, which provided accommodation and transportation to visitors to Yellowstone National Park from 1892 to 1980. Child was, with park superintendent and National Park Service administrator Horace Albright, singularly responsible for the development of the park as a tourist destination and for the construction of much of the park's visitor infrastructure.

== Early life ==
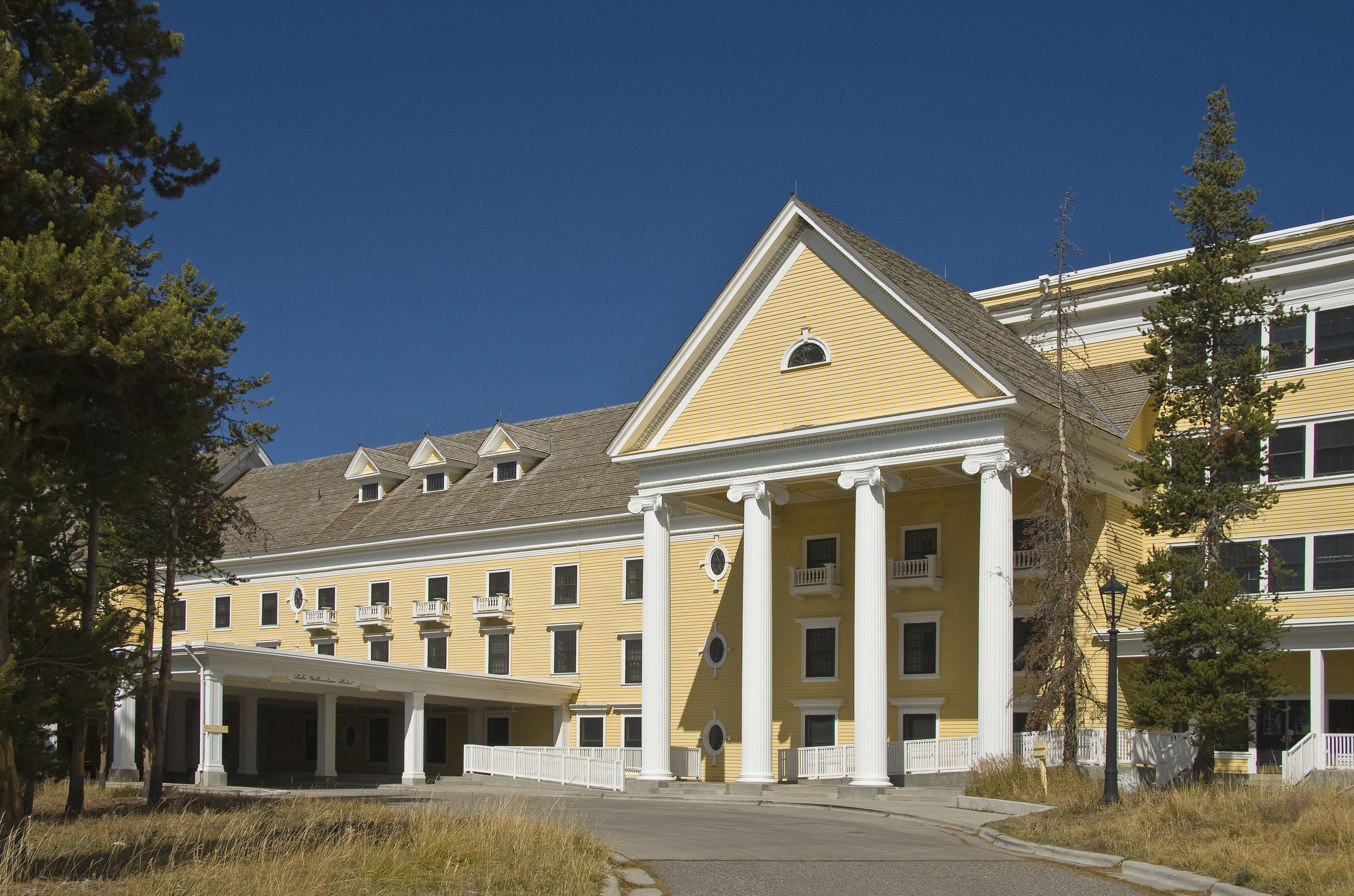
The Lake Hotel in Yellowstone National Park, expanded by Child's Yellowstone Park Hotel Company

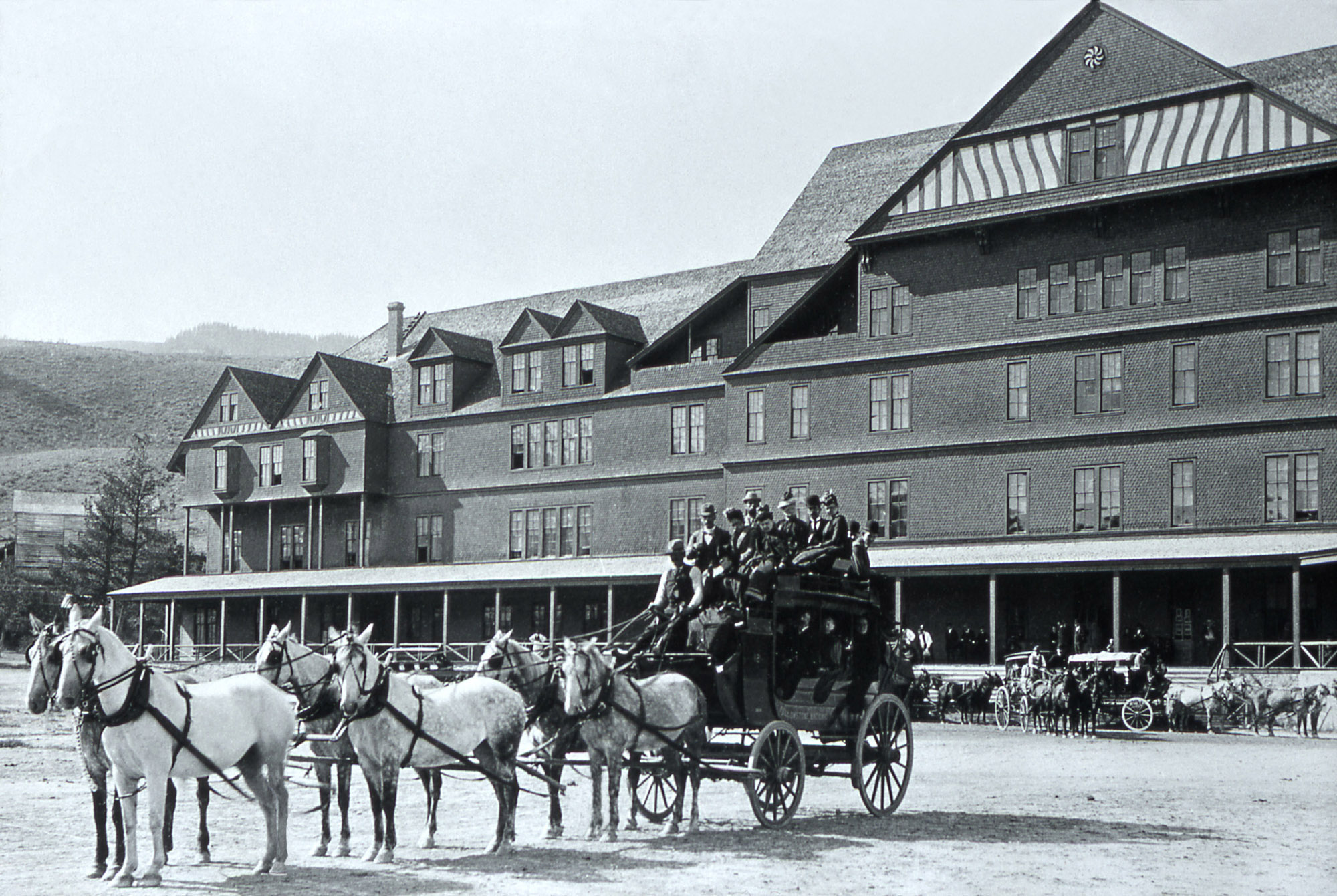
Stage coach at the Mammoth Hot Springs Hotel

Harry W. Child was born in San Francisco in 1857. After abandoning a course of educational preparation in Massachusetts for Harvard, Child returned to San Francisco via Panama. Back in San Francisco he helped to establish the San Francisco Stock Exchange in 1882. He arrived in Helena, Montana with his proceeds from that venture and established himself in mining, transportation and banking. By 1887 Child was working as manager of the Gloster and Gregory silver mines, owned by J. & W. Seligman & Co. Somewhat later, Child successfully managed the construction of a smelter in Great Falls. Child became known for a bold approach to business. In 1887 he was involved in a labor dispute at the Gregory mine, negotiating a $250,000 payment to the miners, collecting the cash in Helena, and evading robbery attempts on the way back to the mine. In hindsight, the entire incident may have been set up by Child to obscure his own management error. In 1887 he In 1889 formed the short-lived Helena, Hot Springs and Smelter Railroad. One of his partners in the venture was his brother-in-law Edmund Bach. In 1892 Child and Bach formed the Yellowstone Park Transportation Company along with partners Silas Huntley (another brother-in-law) and Aaron and L.H. Hershfeld.

== Yellowstone Park Company ==
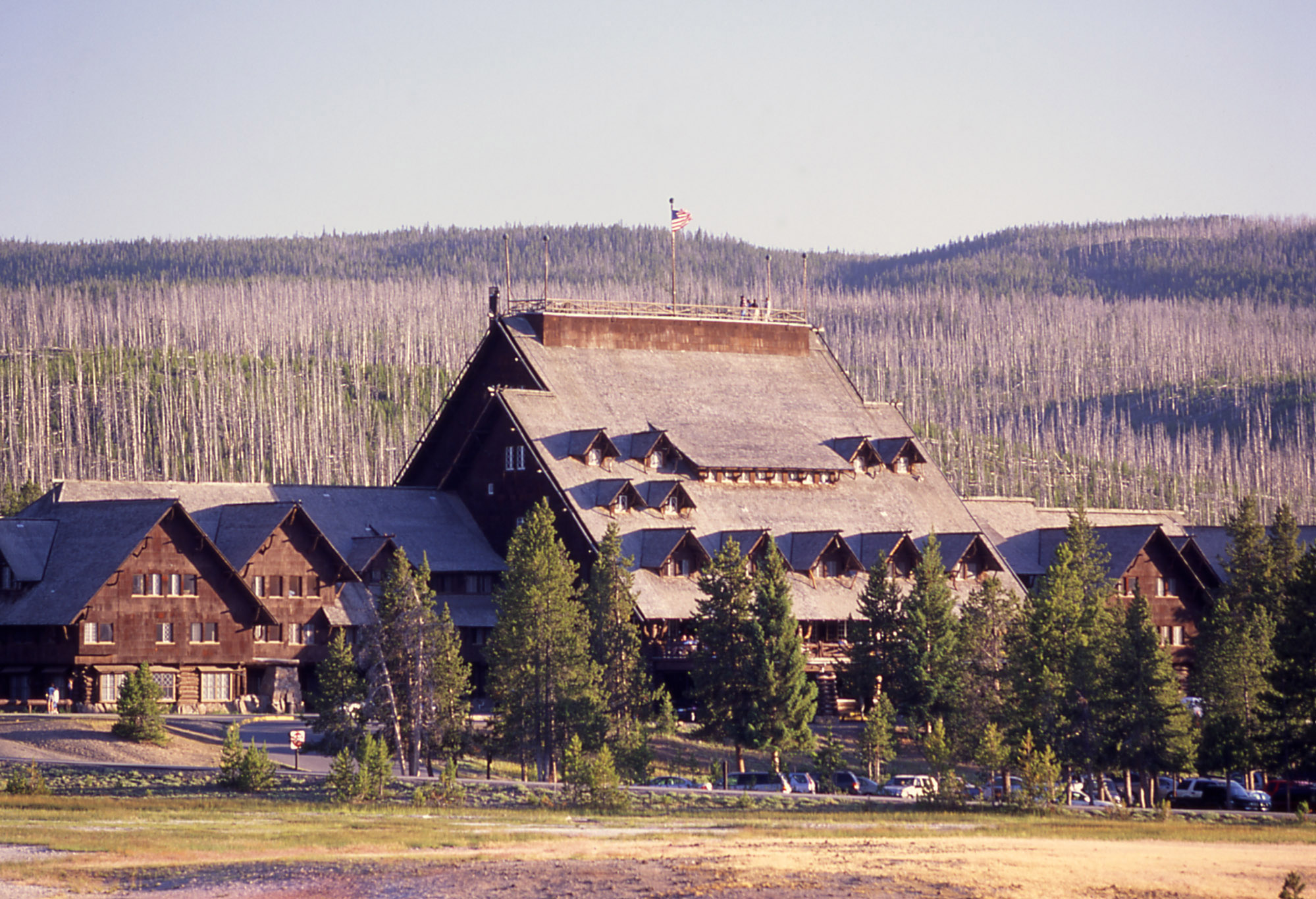
Old Faithful Inn

The Yellowstone Park Transportation Company had an exclusive agreement with the Northern Pacific Railway to transport arriving railroad passengers into the park. The railroad owned a majority interest in the Yellowstone Park Association, which ran the majority of the in-park Yellowstone hotel concessions. After the railroad's minority partners and managers in the YPA left the company, Child, Huntley and Bach bought the YPA in 1898 with financing from the railroad. Child became president of the company. Huntley died and Bach suffered political scandal. Bach and Huntley's stock reverted to the Northern Pacific, but Child bought enough of the stock to own half the business by 1905, and in 1907 bought the remainder from the Northern Pacific, which sought to divest itself of the company after the Northern Securities scandal. Again, the Northern Pacific provided financing of the purchase. In 1909 Child reorganized the company, dissolving the YPA and creating the Yellowstone Park Hotel Company, with himself as president, his son Huntley as treasurer and his son-in-law William Nichols as secretary.

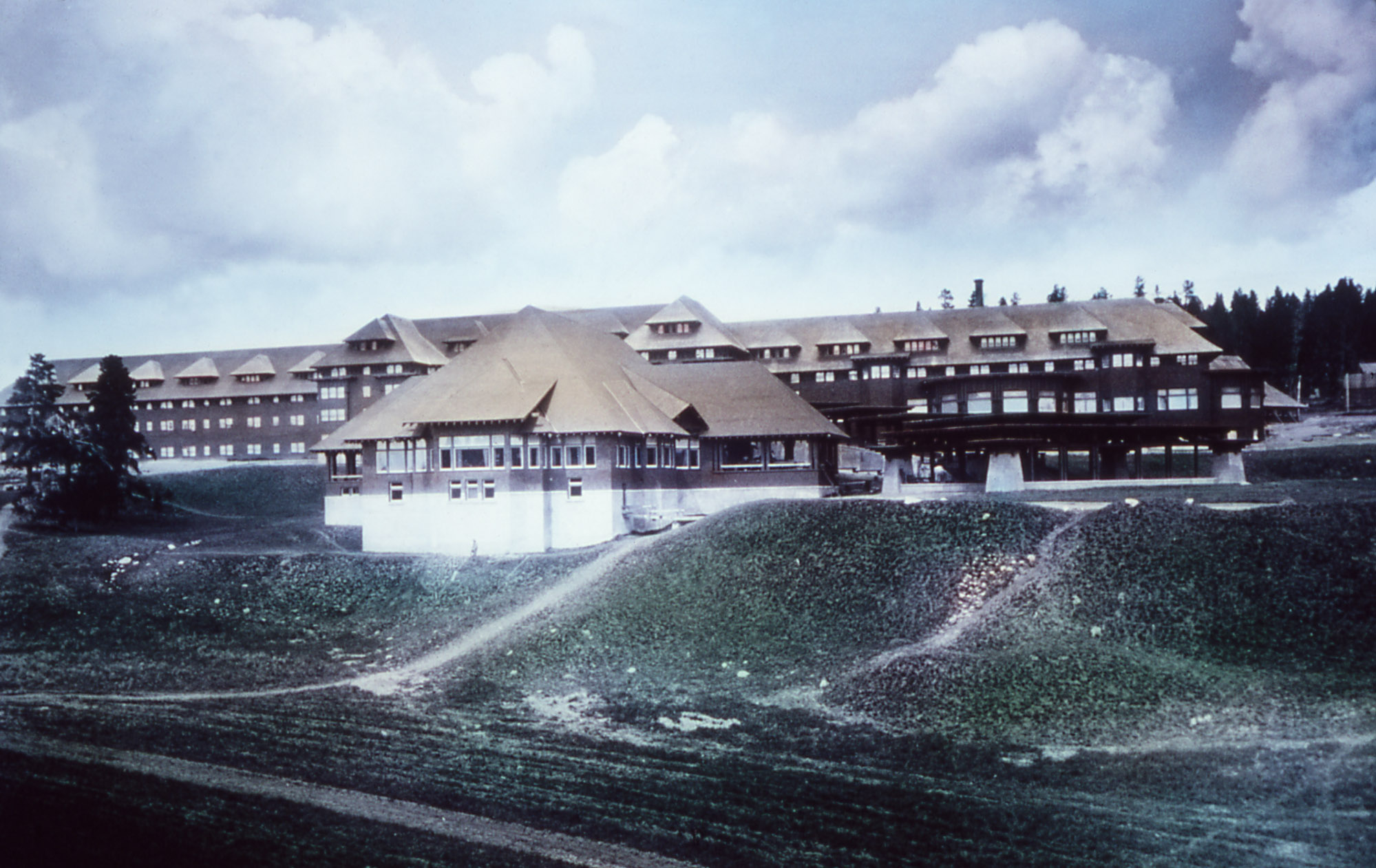
The Canyon Hotel

Child aggressively expanded the hotel concession. At the turn of the century, the Upper Geyser Basin, the largest concentration of geysers in the world and home of Old Faithful, was a half-day's ride from the nearest hotel. Child obtained permission to build a hotel at the Upper Geyser Basin. He had met Robert Reamer, a young architect from San Diego, while both wintered in La Jolla, California. Child set Reamer to design and construct the Old Faithful Inn in 1903, which became an iconic example of rustic log construction. At about the same time Child and Reamer expanded the Lake Hotel and another hotel at the Yellowstone Canyon. The same year, Child accompanied Theodore Roosevelt on his grand tour of Yellowstone. Child would also accompany Warren Harding in 1923, Calvin Coolidge in 1927, and future president Herbert Hoover in 1928. Child also conducted the King of Sweden through the park, receiving a knighthood in return.

In 1905, the Interstate Commerce Commission ruled against Child and the Northern Pacific in an unfair trade practices dispute with William Wylie, operator of several tent camps in Yellowstone. Thwarted in his attempt to drive Wylie out of business, Child recruited investors to buy out Wylie, while Child remained in the background. The newly acquired company kept the Wylie name and was incorporated as the Wylie Permanent Camping Company. With improvements to services mandated by Child, the camping business expanded rapidly.

Reamer, by now a close family friend, accompanied Harry and Adelaide Child on a European tour in 1909. The next year he designed a new Canyon Hotel for Child, built on a scale far greater than any previous park building. The Canyon Hotel quickly became the premier hotel in the park. In 1911 Child added the Yellowstone Park Boat Company to his portfolio, offering excursions on Yellowstone Lake. However, Child gave up a portion of his share of the Wylie Permanent Camping Company to friend and competitor F. Jay Haynes, who operated photography concessions in the park, and who held the Union Pacific Railroad's hotel concession in the park. Until this time the Union Pacific concession was largely theoretical, but with the extension of rail service to West Yellowstone, Montana, the UP and Haynes became a threat to Child's core business. The sale effectively bought Haynes' cooperation as a competitor. The records for the Yellowstone Park Company from 1925 to 1967 are held at Montana State University's Archives and Special Collections.

== Other ventures ==
In Helena, Montana, Child developed Green Meadow Ranch. Child bought the property in 1887 on behalf of investors that included executives of the Northern Pacific Railroad, selling it at a substantial markup to the St. Paul and Helena Land and Improvement Company. In 1914 Child bought back the property, by then a poultry-raising venture, and brought in Reamer to design an enormous Swiss Chalet-style house, barn, blacksmith shop and granary complex. The house burned in 1924, and the barn in 1956. The granary and blacksmith shop remain, and are the object of preservation efforts.

Child also developed Oro Fino Terrace, a complex of six three-story units under one roof at 802-812 North Benton Avenue, designed by Saint Paul architect Ralph Edgerton. Built in 1887, Oro Fino Terrace burned in 1985.

In 1913 Child and partner Charles Anceney established the Flying D Ranch, covering 80,000 acres (32,000 ha) in Madison and Gallatin counties. By 1920 the ranch comprised 100,000 acres (40,000 ha) and leased another 400,000 acres (160,000 ha).

== Automobile tourism ==
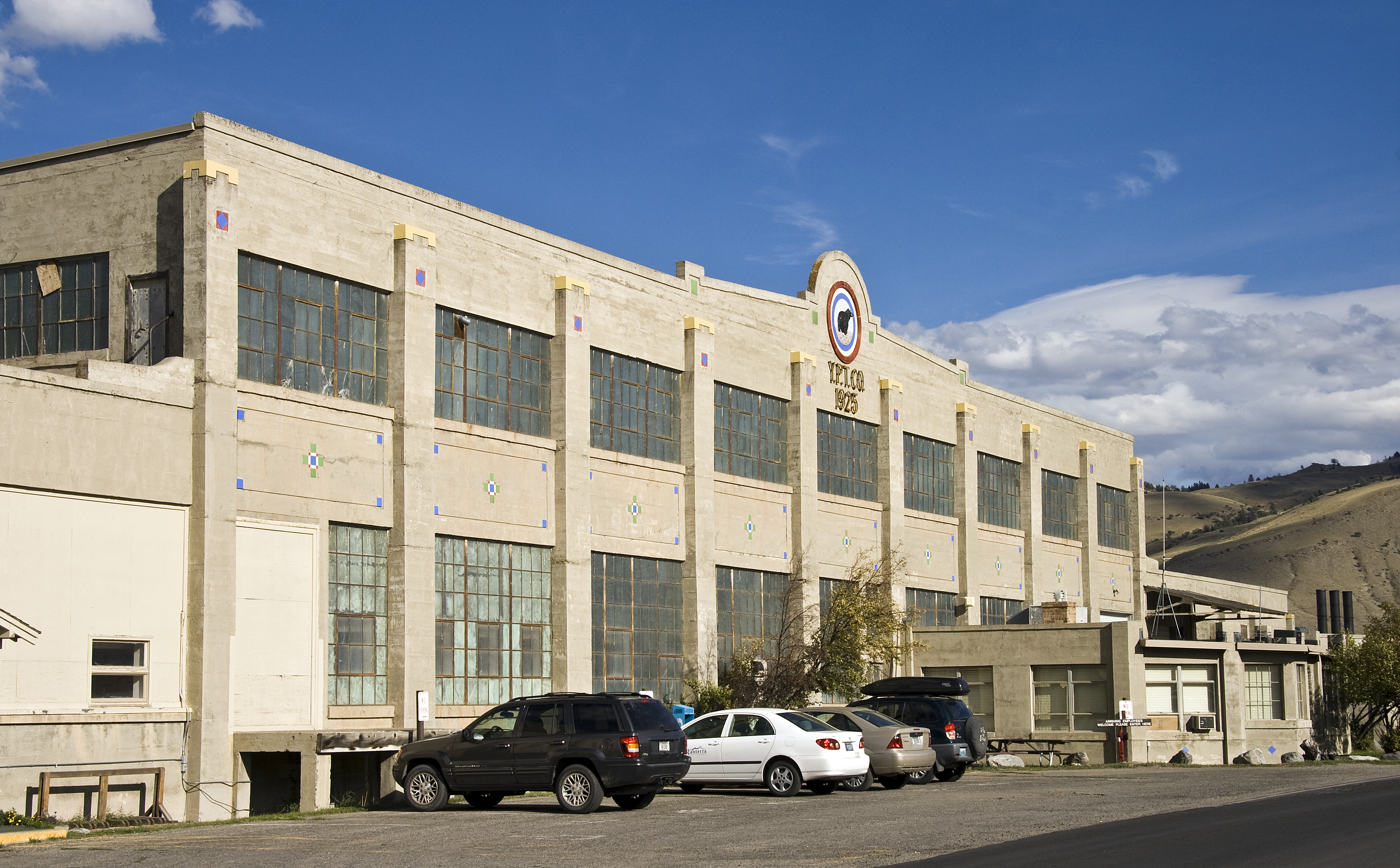
Yellowstone Park Transportation Company warehouse in Gardiner, Montana

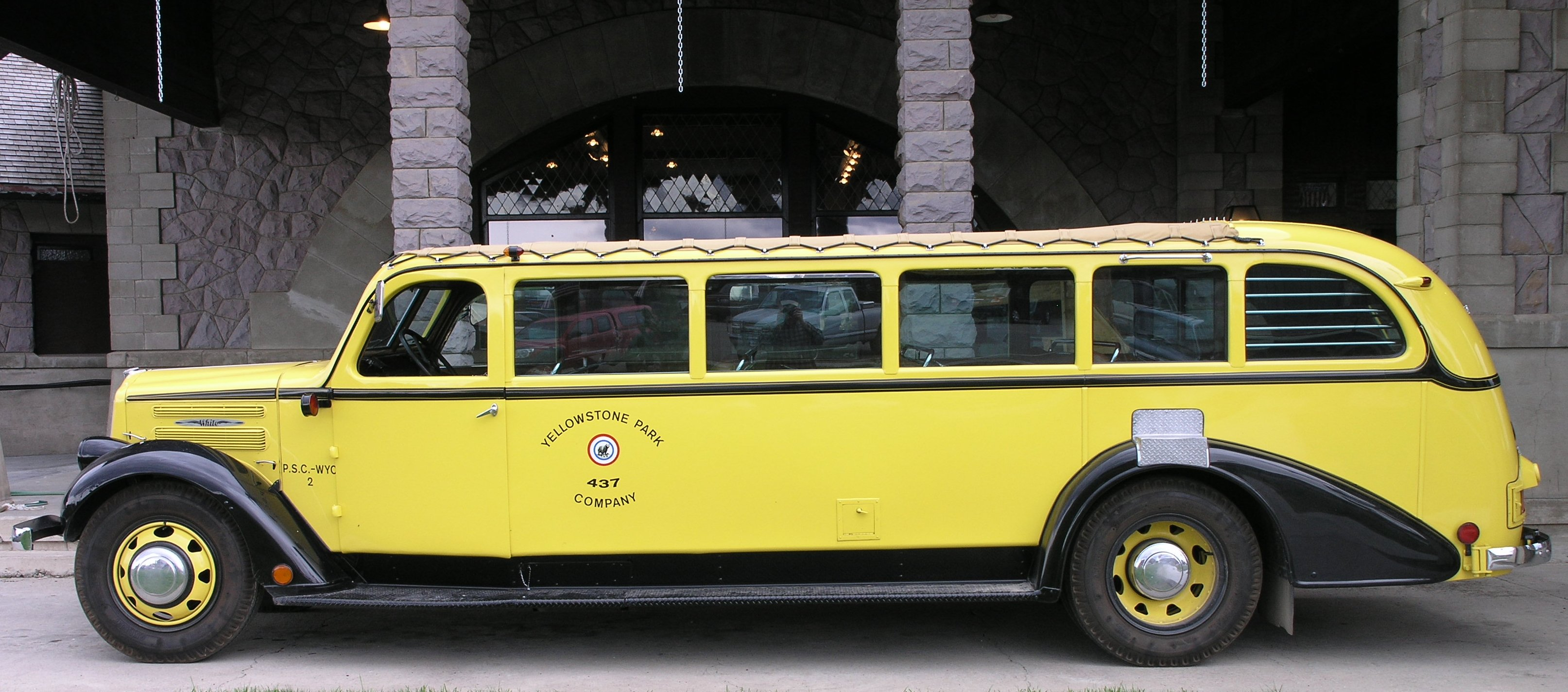
Yellowstone Park White bus

Automobiles remained banned in Yellowstone long after they were admitted in other national parks, due to the influence of Child and the Northern Pacific. In 1916, as part of an effort to exert Park Service control over concessioners, Park Service director Stephen Mather dictated a settlement between Yellowstone concessioners that sold all of Haynes' interests apart from his photography business to Child, while Child gave up his interest in the Wylie camping operation to a new organization, in return for the park's motorized transportation concession. As a result of this deal, Child became the beneficiary of three railroads: the Northern Pacific, the Union Pacific, and the Burlington. Child used the railroads' resources to borrow money for a fleet of custom-built White Motor Company touring buses and touring cars. Child closed the Fountain Hotel, which was no longer needed as a relay point.

Child suffered bouts of ill health beginning in 1916, the result of diabetes and other problems. Mather and assistant Horace Albright were concerned about the future of the Yellowstone concessions should Child die, since his Child's son Huntley so angered Mather in 1916 that he was no longer permitted to conduct business with the Park Service. Child suffered financial difficulties in 1917 as a result of the decline in tourism that accompanied the United States' entry into World War I, but emerged healthy enough to consider re-absorbing the Wylie camping concession when it became available in 1918, which had suffered more heavily in the downturn. However, former Wylie employee Howard Hays arranged to purchase the concession with Park Service approval, renaming it the Yellowstone Park Camp Company in 1919. But by 1924, with Hays in ill health, Child bought the Yellowstone Park Camps Company, renaming it the Yellowstone Park Lodge and Camps Company, effectively cementing a monopoly of the major Yellowstone concessions.

== Marriage and descendants ==
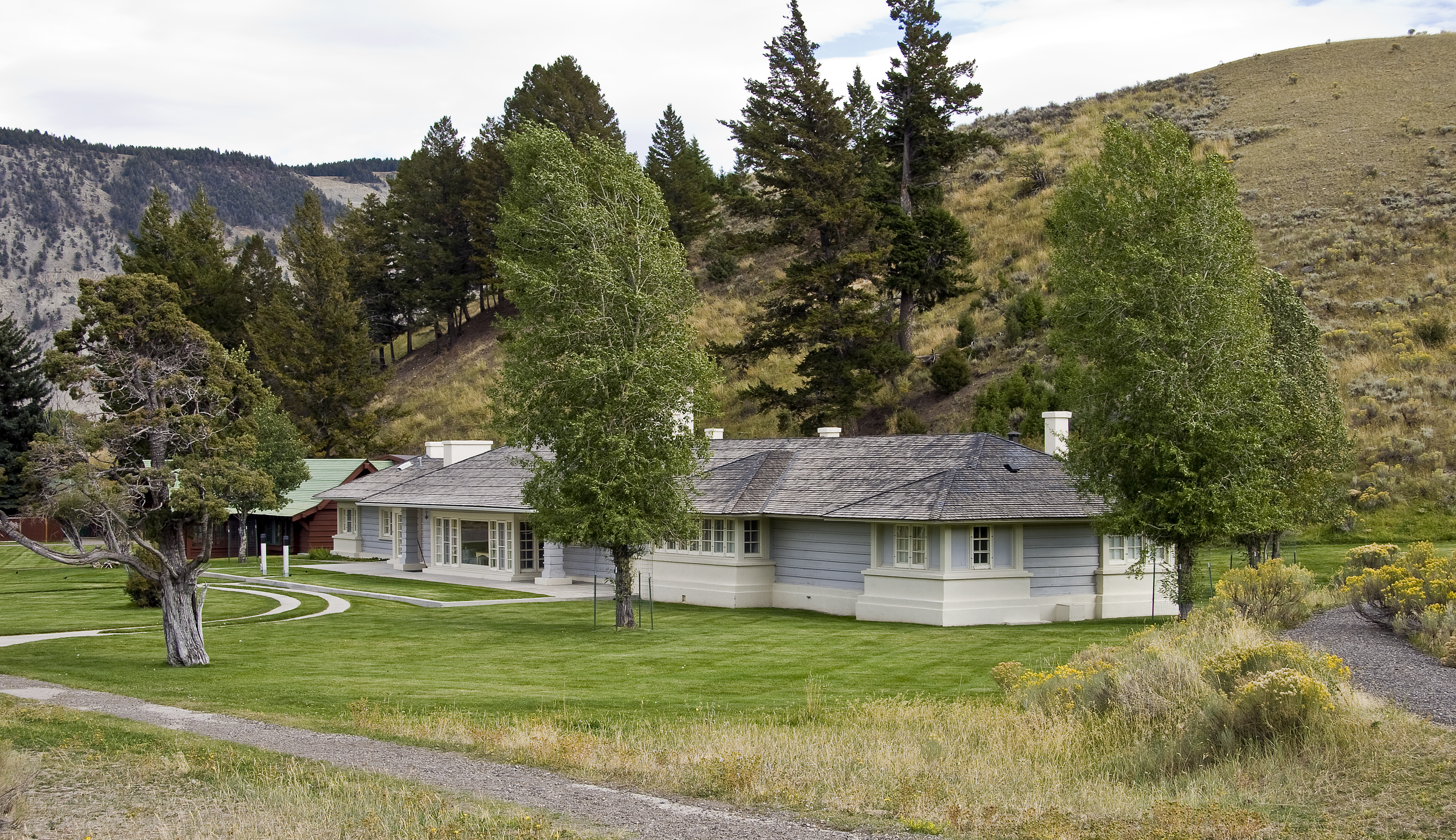
The Executive House at Mammoth Hot Springs in Yellowstone National Park, home of the Child family when in Yellowstone

Harry Child married Adelaide Dean in 1883. Their children included Huntley Child, who managed the Yellowstone Park Hotel Company during his father's illness in 1916, angering Stephen Mather, which resulted in his expulsion from the company by his father. Daughter Ellen Child Nichols married William Nichols, who started as secretary to his father-in-law in 1907 and became president of the Yellowstone Park Company at Child's death in 1931. Ellen became chairman of the company in 1963 and was treasurer in 1965, selling the Yellowstone Park Company to Goldfield Enterprises in 1966.

Child died on February 4, 1931 at his winter home in La Jolla, California.

== Sources ==
- Barringer, Mark Daniel. Selling Yellowstone: Capitalism and the Construction of Nature, Lawrence, Kansas: University Press of Kansas, 2002. ISBN 0-7006-1167-3
- Haines, Aubrey L. The Yellowstone Story: A History of Our First National Park, Niwot, Colorado: University Press of Colorado, 1996. ISBN 0-87081-390-0
- Quinn, Ruth. Weaver of Dreams: The Life and Architecture of Robert C. Reamer, Gardiner, Montana: Leslie & Ruth Quinn, 2004. ISBN 0-9760945-0-9
