= Lake Hotel =

- U.S. National Register of Historic Places
- U.S. National Historic Landmark
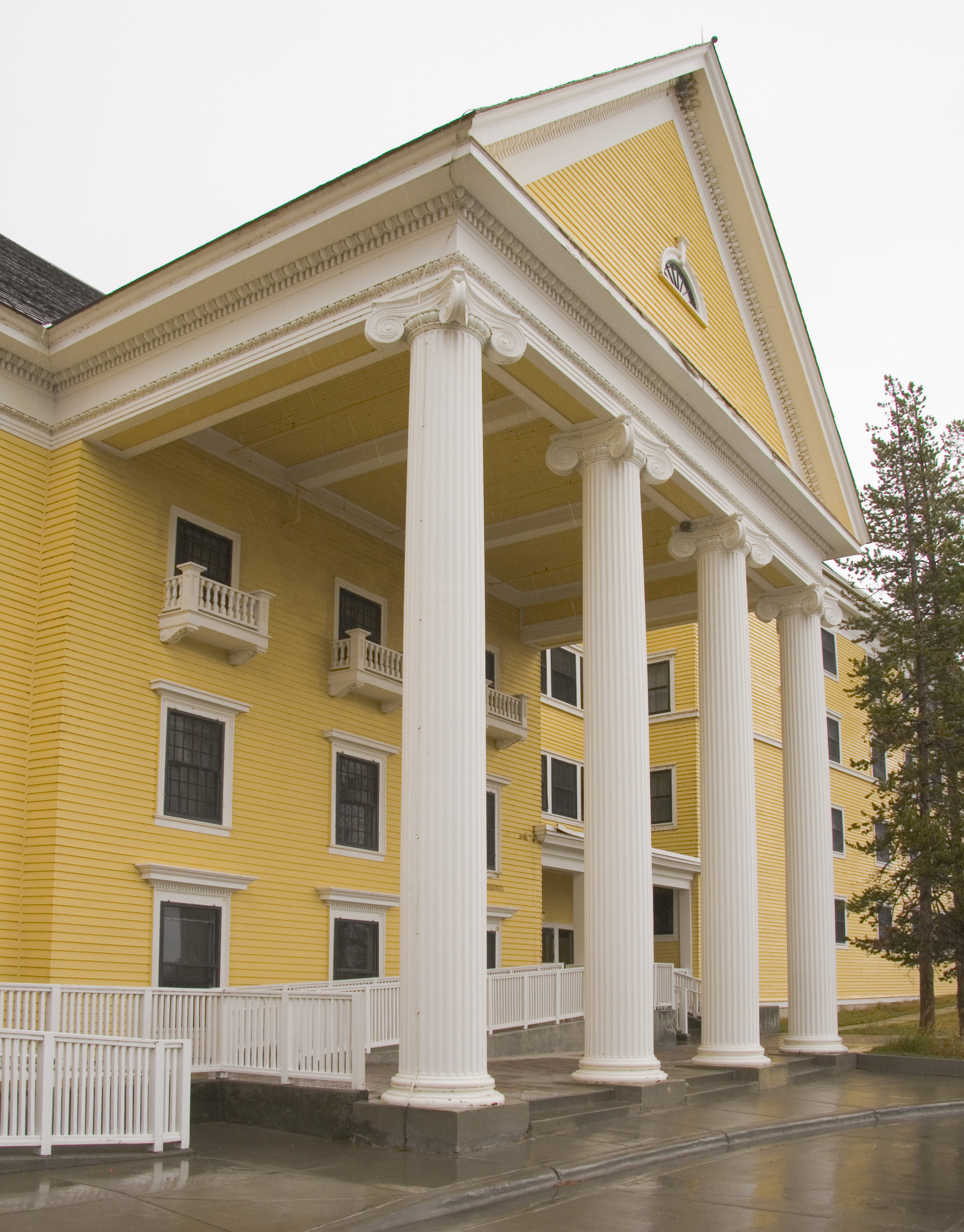

- Location within Wyoming Location within the United States
- Location: Yellowstone National Park, Wyoming
- Coordinates: 44°32′59″N 110°24′0″W
- Area: 6.1 acres (2.5 ha)
- Built: 1891; major redesign 1903
- Architect: Reamer, Robert C.
- Architectural style: Colonial Revival
- NRHP reference No.: 91000637

Significant dates
- Added to NRHP: May 16, 1991
- Designated NHL: February 27, 2015

The Lake Hotel, also known as Lake Yellowstone Hotel, is one of a series of hotels built to accommodate visitors to Yellowstone National Park in the late 19th and early 20th century. Built in 1891, it is the oldest operating hotel in the park. It was re-designed and substantially expanded by Robert Reamer, architect of the Old Faithful Inn in 1903. In contrast to the Old Faithful Inn and many other western park facilities, the Lake Hotel is a relatively plain clapboarded Colonial Revival structure with three large Ionic porticoes facing Yellowstone Lake. It was inducted into Historic Hotels of America in 2012 and designated a National Historic Landmark in 2015.

== Ownership and construction ==
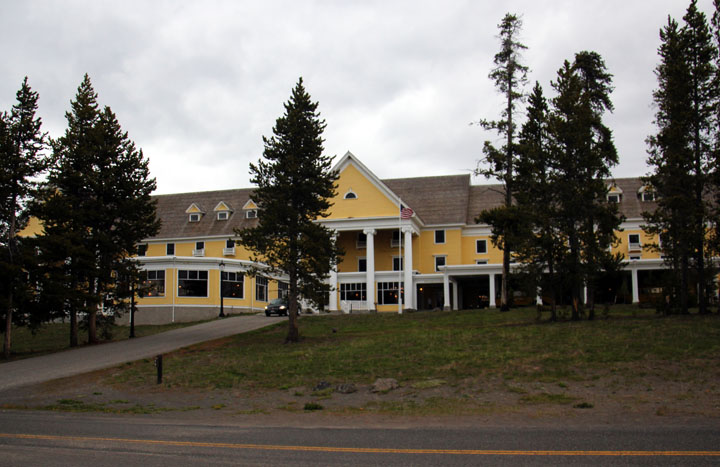
View from the front of the Lake Hotel, showing the iconic porticoes

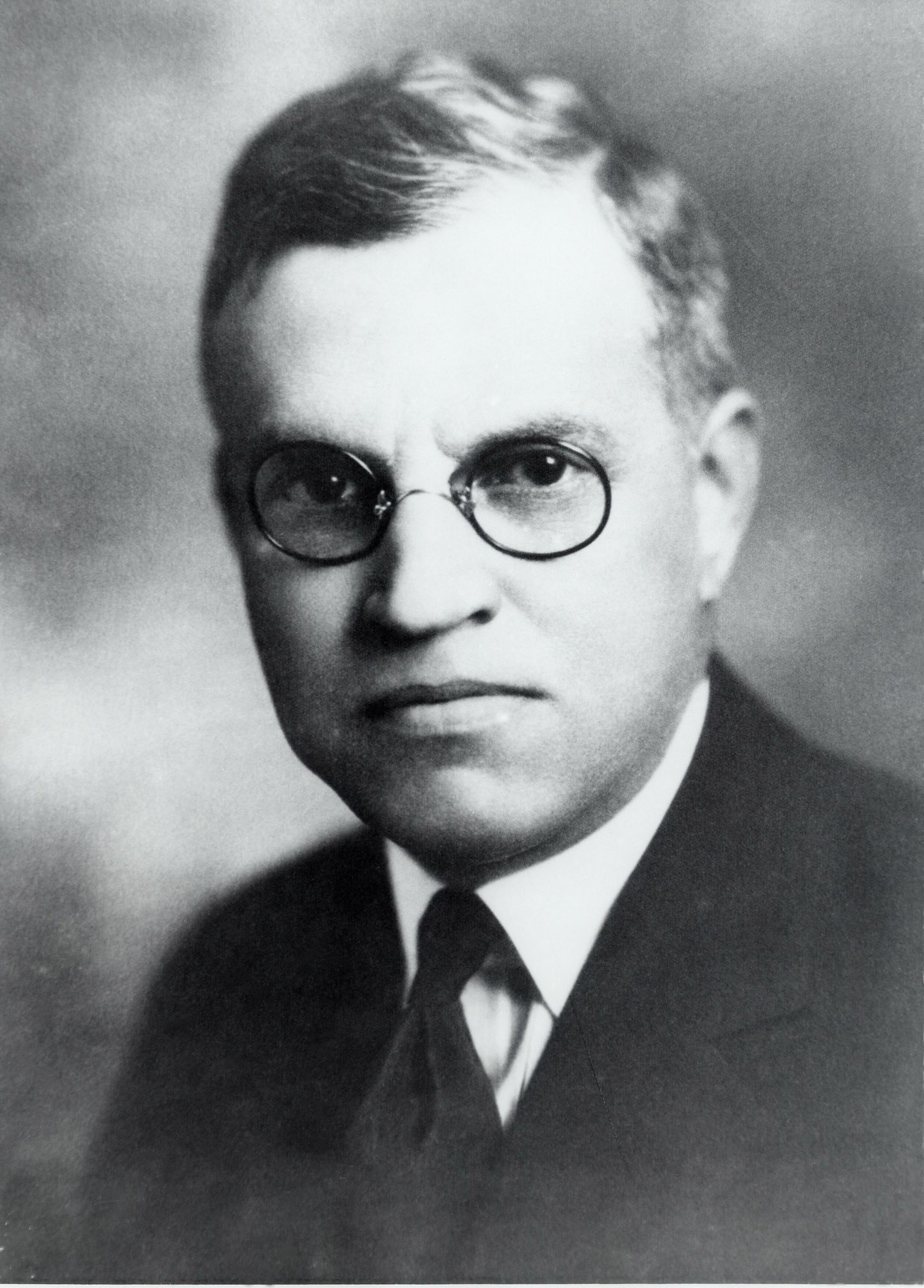
Robert Reamer, the man who gave the Lake Hotel its iconic Neo-Classical look

The initial construction of the Lake Hotel was tumultuous, in 1886 a lease was given to the Yellowstone Park Association (YPA) for the construction of 4 different hotels on 4 different sites, one of those being the Lake Hotel. The lease was granted by Yellowstone National Park, and the YPA, headed by Charles Gibson, was made up of members chosen by the Northern Pacific Railroad (NP). The NP had significant interest in the commercial development of Yellowstone National Park at this time as they had recently constructed their railway to run adjacent to the park. The NP had loaned the YPA money, hoping for hotel development in the Park. The YPA initially made little progress on the Lake Hotel site, 2 years into the lease, construction had yet to begin. Construction on the site proved to be difficult because of the remoteness, lack of labor, and materiel. Slow construction angered the National Park and the lease was adjusted to reduce the acreage of the site to only 1 acre. Forest fires and difficulty with materiel being delivered to the site further slowed construction.

== Early years ==
The Lake Hotel would officially open to visitors in 1891, 5 years after the lease was granted. The hotel was initially very plain, with 3 stories, clapboard siding, and projecting bays at each end. It also included aspects of Queen Anne architecture, characterized by the use of striped wood as ornament throughout the interior. In 1893, rates were 4 dollars a day for the first 6 days. In 1895 the hotel began serving drinks to its patrons, as one of the rooms was converted to a bar area. In 1900 the hotel received a yellow paint job, a similar color to the one currently coating the Lake Hotel.

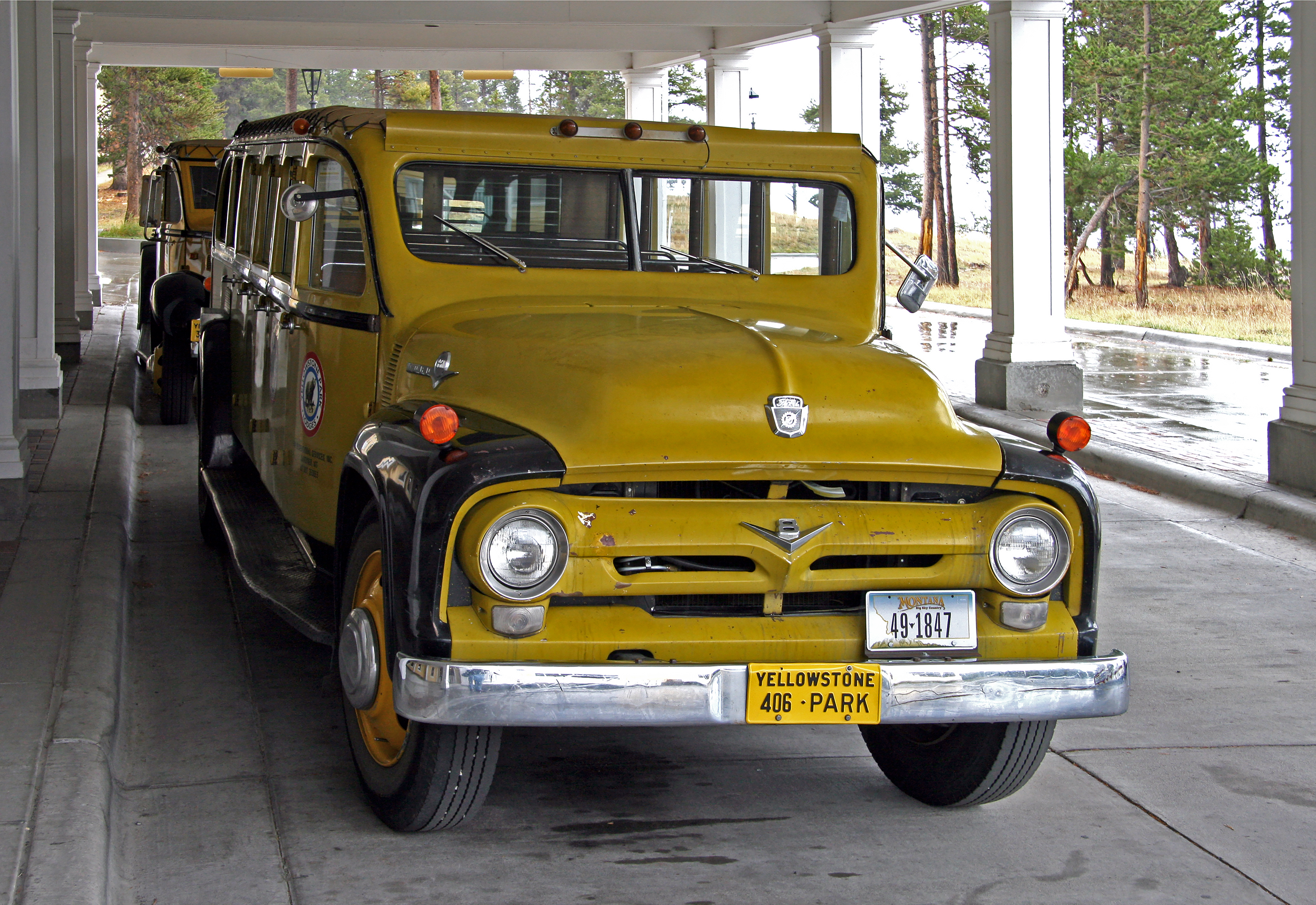
This iconic Ford bus sits out front the Lake Hotel with its matching yellow color

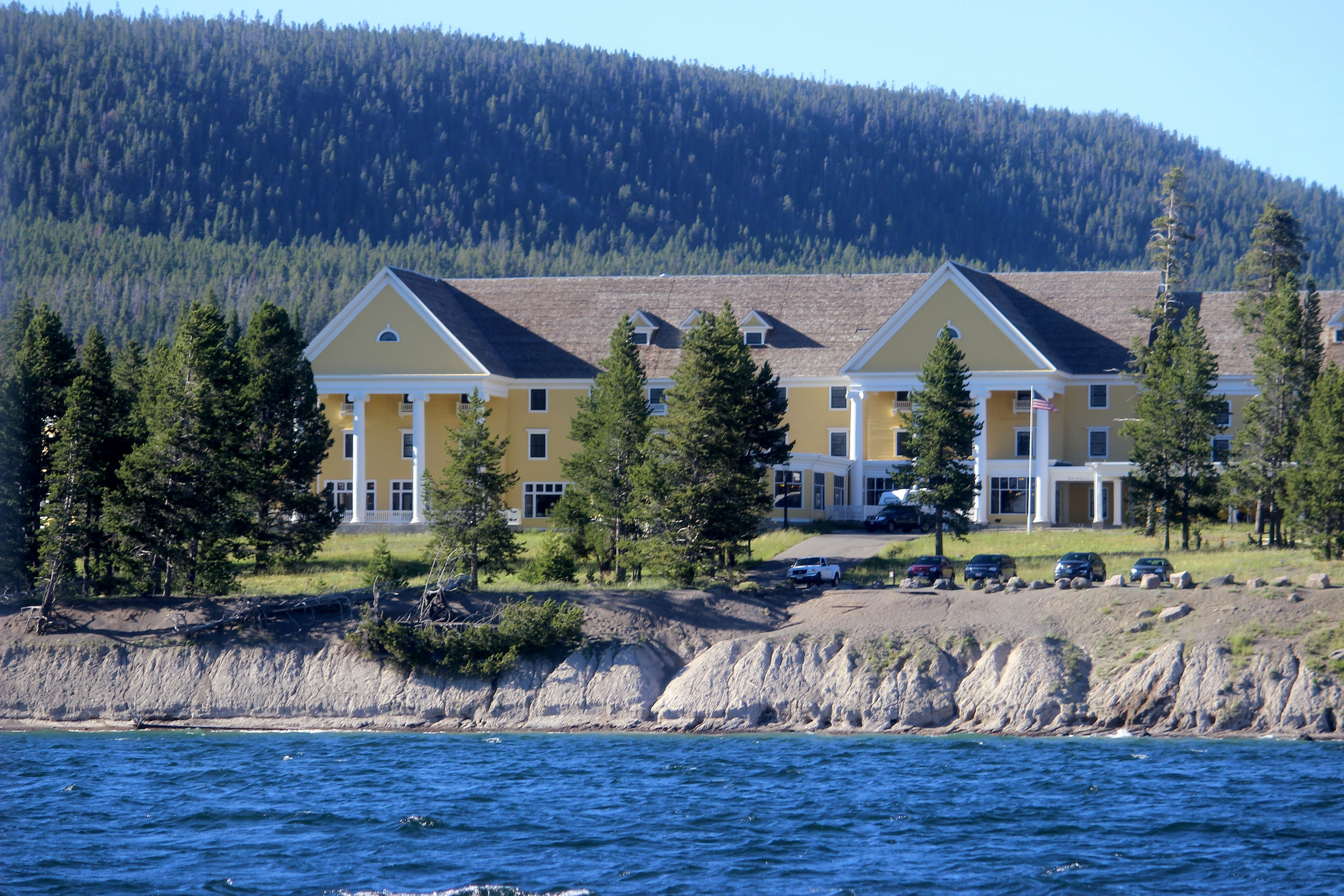
View of the Lake Hotel, from a distance

In 1897, the Hotel only earned $4,200 more than it spent, and this profit was promptly spent on repairs. As the Hotel struggled, the Railroad that owned the hotel did as well. In 1899 in an attempt to liquidate themselves, The Northern Pacific Railroad put the YPA, and thus the Lake Hotel up for sale. Harry Child, a banker would end up as owner of the YPA, with significant financial assistance from the NPs holding company, The Northwest Improvement Company(NIC). It would be Harry Child, who would oversea the operations of the hotel going froward. Child is also credited for bringing on Robert Reamer, to make key renovations to the Lake Hotel.

== Renovations ==
Robert Reamer began work on the Lake Hotel in 1903, he had already gained notoriety in Yellowstone as an architect when he designed the original Old Faithfull Inn, and the second Canyon Hotel, both within Yellowstone National Park. Reamer had large plans for the Lake Hotel, he would extent the hotel farther east, and transform the style into Neo-Classical. At 3 different points on the front of the hotel, Reamer would create a wooden extension on the porch and roofline, connecting these extensions were 4 Neo-Classical columns. These Columns coupled with the extensions on the deck and roof would create the iconic porticoes that the Lake Hotel is known for now. Decorative moldings were also added to the exterior to reinforce the Neo-classical style.

The Last major changes by Reamer happened in 1928, when an extension to the east wing was made, this portion would have a flat roof. Reamer also expanded the lobby by enclosing a portion of the porch. Reamer then repainted columns and added glass light fixtures. These changes would add a Colonial aspect to the style of the architecture. Reamer and Child are credited for giving the Lake Hotel the iconic look that visitors recognize it for now. The renovations aligned perfectly with the introduction of automobiles into the park, visitation to The National Park would grow considerably and with it, patrons of the Lake Hotel. The Lake Hotel would boom in popularity following these renovations. Further renovations that century took place from 1984 to 1990.

In the years following 2012 more extensive renovations began. Renovations attempted to restore the colonial revival architecture, the style of architecture the hotel was originally designed in. Carpeting was replaced with hardwood floors, antique style furniture replaced more modern furniture, and aspects of lighting were changed to fit the style of the period. Construction during this time also ensured the building against seismic activity as the Yellowstone area is a hotspot for earthquakes, experiencing 1,500 to 2,5000 per year. Throughout 2013 and 2014, the emphasis of the renovation was placed on the east wing, where all the rooms were renovated, and office spaces were relocated and turned into rooms. The 2014 renovation included internet, something new and not common to national parks. Computers and printers were also implemented for the first time.

== Historical recognition ==
The Lake Hotel is adjoined by the Lake Fish Hatchery Historic District and the Grand Loop Road Historic District.

Lake Yellowstone Hotel & Cabins is a member of Historic Hotels of America, the official program of the National Trust for Historic Preservation.

== See also ==
- List of Historic Hotels of America
- List of National Historic Landmarks in Wyoming
