= List of Yellowstone geothermal features =

This is a sortable table of the notable geysers, hot springs, and other geothermal features in the geothermal areas of Yellowstone National Park.

Geothermal features of Yellowstone
Name	Location	Image
A-0 Geyser	Lower Geyser Basin; 44.543109°N 110.796341°W	
Abyss Pool	West Thumb Geyser Basin; 44.418250°N 110.572571°W	
Anemone Geyser	Upper Geyser Basin; 44.46273°N 110.8289°W	
Artemisia Geyser	Upper Geyser Basin; 44.478241°N 110.848831°W	
Artesia Geyser	Lower Geyser Basin; 44.544106°N 110.784207°W	
Atomizer Geyser	Upper Geyser Basin; 44.478124°N 110.849104°W	
Aurum Geyser	Upper Geyser Basin; 44.464575°N 110.829458°W	
Azure Spring	Lower Geyser Basin; 44.561028°N 110.832194°W	
Baby Daisy Geyser	Upper Geyser Basin; 44.481796°N 110.850667°W	
Beach Geyser	West Thumb Geyser Basin; 44°24′55″N 110°34′09″W	
Bead Geyser	Lower Geyser Basin; 44.543823°N 110.795211°W	
Beauty Pool	Upper Geyser Basin; 44.468544°N 110.838822°W	
Beehive Geyser	Upper Geyser Basin; 44.462989°N 110.829934°W	
Belgian Pool	Upper Geyser Basin; 44°27′58″N 110°50′13″W	
Bellefontaine Geyser	Lower Geyser Basin; 44°35′00″N 110°49′03″W	
Beryl Spring	Gibbon Geyser Basin; 44.679102°N 110.746877°W	
Big Alcove Spring	Norris Geyser Basin; 44.718889°N 110.706944°W	
Big Cone	West Thumb Geyser Basin; 44°24′38″N 110°34′44″W	
Big Cub Geyser	Upper Geyser Basin; 44.4666°N 110.834100°W	
Bijou Geyser	Upper Geyser Basin; 44.471322°N 110.840489°W	
Black Pool	West Thumb Geyser Basin; 44.417995°N 110.571873°W	
Black Growler Steam Vent	Norris Geyser Basin; 44°43′00″N 110°42′03″W	
Black Opal Pool	Upper Geyser Basin; 44.485077°N 110.853514°W	
Blue Geyser	Norris Geyser Basin; 44.729197°N 110.701349°W	
Blue Star Spring	Upper Geyser Basin; 44.461926°N 110.828638°W	
Bombshell Geyser	Glen Africa Basin	
Botryoidal Spring	Lower Geyser Basin; 44.534882°N 110.799529°W	
Box Spring	Lower Geyser Basin; 44.543425°N 110.795387°W	
Brilliant Pool	Upper Geyser Basin; 44.470113°N 110.844416°W	
Bronze Geyser	Shoshone Geyser Basin; 44°21′13″N 110°47′57″W	
Bulger Geyser	Upper Geyser Basin; 44°27′57″N 110°50′14″W	
Butterfly Spring	Upper Geyser Basin; 44.463678°N 110.827983°W	
Cascade Geyser	Upper Geyser Basin; 44.462471°N 110.828983°W	
Castle Geyser	Upper Geyser Basin; 44°27′49″N 110°50′12″W	
Catfish Geyser	Lower Geyser Basin; 44°31′08″N 110°49′39″W	
Cauliflower Geyser	Upper Geyser Basin; 44.483457°N 110.850398°W	
Chain Lakes	Upper Geyser Basin; 44°28′22″N 110°50′33″W	
Chimney Cone	Upper Geyser Basin; 44°27′43.19″N 110°49′44.41″W	
Chinese Spring	Upper Geyser Basin; 44°29′00″N 110°50′14″W	
Churn Geyser	Upper Geyser Basin; 44°29′00″N 110°50′14″W	
Clepsydra Geyser	Lower Geyser Basin; 44.554100°N 110.810489°W	
Cliff Geyser	Upper Geyser Basin; 44°27′43″N 110°51′15″W	
Comet Geyser	Upper Geyser Basin; 44.470182°N 110.844400°W	
Constant Geyser	Norris Geyser Basin; 44°43′55″N 110°42′33″W	
Coral Geyser	Upper Geyser Basin; 44.462613°N 110.852970°W	
Corporal Geyser	Norris Geyser Basin; 44.723016°N 110.705689°W	
Crested Pool	Upper Geyser Basin; 44°27′50″N 110°50′12″W	
Chromatic Spring	Upper Geyser Basin; 44°28′06″N 110°50′21″W	
Daisy Geyser	Upper Geyser Basin; 44.469933°N 110.844934°W	
Dilemma Geyser	Lower Geyser Basin; 44.535187°N 110.799677°W	
Deluge Geyser	Heart Lake Geyser Basin; 44°18′22″N 110°31′38″W	
Depression Geyser	Upper Geyser Basin; 44.463020°N 110.830488°W	
Dragon's Mouth Spring	Hayden Valley; 44.625156°N 110.434862°W	
Doublet Pool	Upper Geyser Basin; 44.464319°N 110.829624°W	
Ear Spring	Upper Geyser Basin; 44.4645°N 110.8304°W	
Ebony Geyser	Norris Geyser Basin; 44.729535°N 110.705745°W	
Echinus Geyser	Norris Geyser Basin; 44.722435°N 110.70132°W	
Economic Geyser	Upper Geyser Basin; 44°29′00″N 110°50′03″W	
Emerald Spring	Norris Geyser Basin; 44.699936°N 110.684097°W	
Excelsior Geyser	Midway Geyser Basin; 44.526322°N 110.836878°W	
Fan and Mortar Geysers	Upper Geyser Basin; 44°28′28″N 110°50′33″W	
Fearless Geyser	Norris Geyser Basin; 44°42′00″N 110°41′03″W	
Fishing Cone	West Thumb Geyser Basin; 44°25′06″N 110°34′03″W	
Flood Geyser	Midway Geyser Basin; 44°31′45″N 110°49′43″W	
Fountain Geyser	Lower Geyser Basin; 44.554100°N 110.811878°W	
Fountain Paint Pots	Lower Geyser Basin; 44°33′01″N 110°48′24″W	
Giant Geyser	Upper Geyser Basin; 44.471322°N 110.840489°W	
Giantess Geyser	Upper Geyser Basin; 44°28′30″N 110°50′13″W	
Grand Geyser	Upper Geyser Basin; 44.4666°N 110.838267°W	
Great Fountain Geyser	Lower Geyser Basin; 44°32′08″N 110°47′53″W	
Grand Prismatic Spring	Midway Geyser Basin; 44.525028°N 110.838278°W	
Green Dragon Spring	Norris Geyser Basin; 44.720049°N 110.70708°W	
Grotto Fountain Geyser	Upper Geyser Basin; 44°28′20″N 110°50′30″W	
Grotto Geyser	Upper Geyser Basin; 44°28′19″N 110°50′32″W	
Imperial Geyser	Midway Geyser Basin; 44°31′53″N 110°52′40″W	
Infant Geyser	Upper Geyser Basin; 44.463715°N 110.828357°W	
Jet Geyser	Lower Geyser Basin; 44.554100°N 110.811878°W	
Jewel Geyser	Upper Geyser Basin; 44°29′5.66″N 110°51′22.26″W	
Kaleidoscope Geyser	Lower Geyser Basin; 44.554389°N 110.813246°W	
King Geyser	West Thumb Geyser Basin; 44.418942°N 110.572004°W	
Labial Geyser	Lower Geyser Basin; 44.543674°N 110.795283°W	
Lakeshore Geyser	West Thumb Geyser Basin; 44.416765°N 110.569894°W	
Ledge Geyser	Norris Geyser Basin; 44.727691°N 110.703178°W	
Lion Geyser	Upper Geyser Basin; 44.46408°N 110.83102°W	
Lioness Geyser	Upper Geyser Basin; 44°28′00″N 110°50′03″W	
Little Cub Geyser	Upper Geyser Basin; 44°28′00″N 110°50′03″W	
Little Giant Geyser	Shoshone Geyser Basin; 44°21′23″N 110°47′51″W	
Lone Star Geyser	Lone Star Geyser Basin; 44°25′05″N 110°48′26″W	
Mammoth Hot Springs	44.969094°N 110.707769°W	
Midget Geyser	Upper Geyser Basin; 44.462830°N 110.82933°W	
Minute Geyser	Norris Geyser Basin; 44.725029°N 110.706171°W	
Minute Man Geyser	Shoshone Geyser Basin; 44.354755°N 110.798413°W	
Model Geyser	Upper Geyser Basin; 44.463438°N 110.829607°W	
Monarch Geyser Crater	Norris Geyser Basin; 44°43′00″N 110°42′03″W	
Monument Geyser	Gibbon Geyser Basin; 44°41′00″N 110°45′13″W	
Morning Geyser	Lower Geyser Basin; 44°33′5″N 110°48′30″W	
Morning Glory Pool	Upper Geyser Basin; 44.475°N 110.843611°W	
Mud Geyser	Hayden Valley; 44°37′29″N 110°26′03″W	
Mud Volcano	Hayden Valley; 44°37′23″N 110°25′55″W	
Narcissus Geyser	Lower Geyser Basin; 44.543865°N 110.800247°W	
Oblong Geyser	Upper Geyser Basin; 44°28′09″N 110°50′25″W	
Occasional Geyser	West Thumb Geyser Basin; 44°25′20″N 110°34′27″W	
Ojo Caliente Spring	Lower Geyser Basin; 44°33′46″N 110°50′19″W	
Old Faithful Geyser	Upper Geyser Basin; 44.459167°N 110.826111°W	
Opal Pool	Midway Geyser Basin; 44.526673°N 110.83879°W	
Opalescent Pool	Upper Geyser Basin; 44.463176°N 110.853363°W	
Orange Mound Spring	Mammoth Hot Springs; 44.966474°N 110.714887°W	
Pearl Geyser	Norris Geyser Basin; 44°44′00″N 110°42′03″W	
Penta Geyser	Upper Geyser Basin; 44°27′57″N 110°50′12″W	
Pink Geyser	Lower Geyser Basin; 44.543375°N 110.796335°W	
Pink Cone Geyser	Lower Geyser Basin; 44.543823°N 110.795211°W	
Porkchop Geyser	Norris Geyser Basin; 44.722124°N 110.708103°W	
Pump Geyser	Upper Geyser Basin; 44.463941°N 110.82937°W	
Rainbow Pool	Upper Geyser Basin; 44°28′15″N 110°51′33″W	
Riverside Geyser	Upper Geyser Basin; 44.473544°N 110.840489°W	
Roaring Mountain	Norris-Mammoth Corridor; 44°46′38″N 110°43′39″W	
Rocket Geyser	Upper Geyser Basin; 44.471913°N 110.841761°W	
Rosette Geyser	Lower Geyser Basin; 44.56963°N 110.865182°W	
Rustic Geyser	Heart Lake Geyser Basin; 44°16′56″N 110°30′23″W	
Sapphire Pool	Upper Geyser Basin; 44°29′07″N 110°51′20″W	
Sawmill Geyser	Upper Geyser Basin; 44°27′55″N 110°50′13″W	
Semi-Centennial Geyser	Norris-Mammoth Corridor; 44°47′09″N 110°44′26″W	
Silex Spring	Lower Geyser Basin; 44.550186°N 110.805849°W	
Shield Geyser	Shoshone Geyser Basin; 44°21′18″N 110°47′53″W	
Shield Spring	Upper Geyser Basin; 44.463502°N 110.837161°W	
Snort Geyser	Lower Geyser Basin; 44.29056°N 108.22806°W	
Solitary Geyser	Upper Geyser Basin; 44.468826°N 110.828362°W	
Spa Geyser	Upper Geyser Basin; 44.472443°N 110.841919°W	
South Scalloped Spring	Upper Geyser Basin; 44.465123°N 110.837054°W	
Spasm Geyser	Lower Geyser Basin; 44.551041°N 110.808642°W	
Spasmodic Geyser	Upper Geyser Basin; 44.46556°N 110.83528°W	
Spindle Geyser	Lower Geyser Basin; 44.531601°N 110.795488°W	
Splendid Geyser	Upper Geyser Basin; 44.470205°N 110.844653°W	
Sponge Geyser	Upper Geyser Basin; 44°27′49″N 110°49′46″W	
Spouter Geyser	Upper Geyser Basin; 44°28′00″N 110°52′03″W	
Spray Geyser	Lower Geyser Basin; 44°31′53″N 110°52′27″W	
Steady Geyser	Lower Geyser Basin; 44°32′41″N 110°47′15″W	
Steamboat Geyser	Norris Geyser Basin; 44.7243°N 110.7054°W	
Surprise Pool	Lower Geyser Basin; 44°32′10″N 110°48′02″W	
Sulphur Spring	Hayden Valley; 44°39′15″N 110°28′53″W	
Tardy Geyser	Upper Geyser Basin; 44.465373°N 110.83645°W	
Turban Geyser	Upper Geyser Basin; 44.4666°N 110.834100°W	
Turquoise Pool	Midway Geyser Basin; 44.526631°N 110.837675°W	
Twin Geyser	West Thumb Geyser Basin; 44°25′00″N 110°34′19″W	
Union Geyser	Shoshone Geyser Basin; 44°21′09″N 110°47′58″W	
Valentine Geyser	Norris Geyser Basin; 44°43′40″N 110°42′04″W	
Vent Geyser	Upper Geyser Basin; 44.466877°N 110.837156°W	
Veteran Geyser	Norris Geyser Basin; 44.723044°N 110.705635°W	
Vixen Geyser	Norris Geyser Basin; 44°44′00″N 110°42′03″W	
West Sprinkler Geyser	Lower Geyser Basin; 44.554255°N 110.811075°W	
West Triplet Geyser	Upper Geyser Basin; 44.466378°N 110.836998°W	
Whirligig Geyser	Norris Geyser Basin; 44°44′00″N 110°42′03″W	
Whistle Geyser	Upper Geyser Basin; 44.462281°N 110.852532°W	
Whistler Geyser	Joseph's Coat Springs Thermal Area; 44°44′17″N 110°19′37″W	
White Dome Geyser	Lower Geyser Basin; 44°32′20″N 110°48′10″W	
Young Hopeful and Grey Bulger Geysers	Lower Geyser Basin; 44.549934°N 110.817433°W	
