= Chinese Spring =

Chinese Spring may refer to:

- Chinese Spring Festival
- Chinese spring money
- Chinese spring offensive
- Chinese Spring (Wyoming), a hot spring in Yellowstone National Park
