= Ojo Caliente Spring =

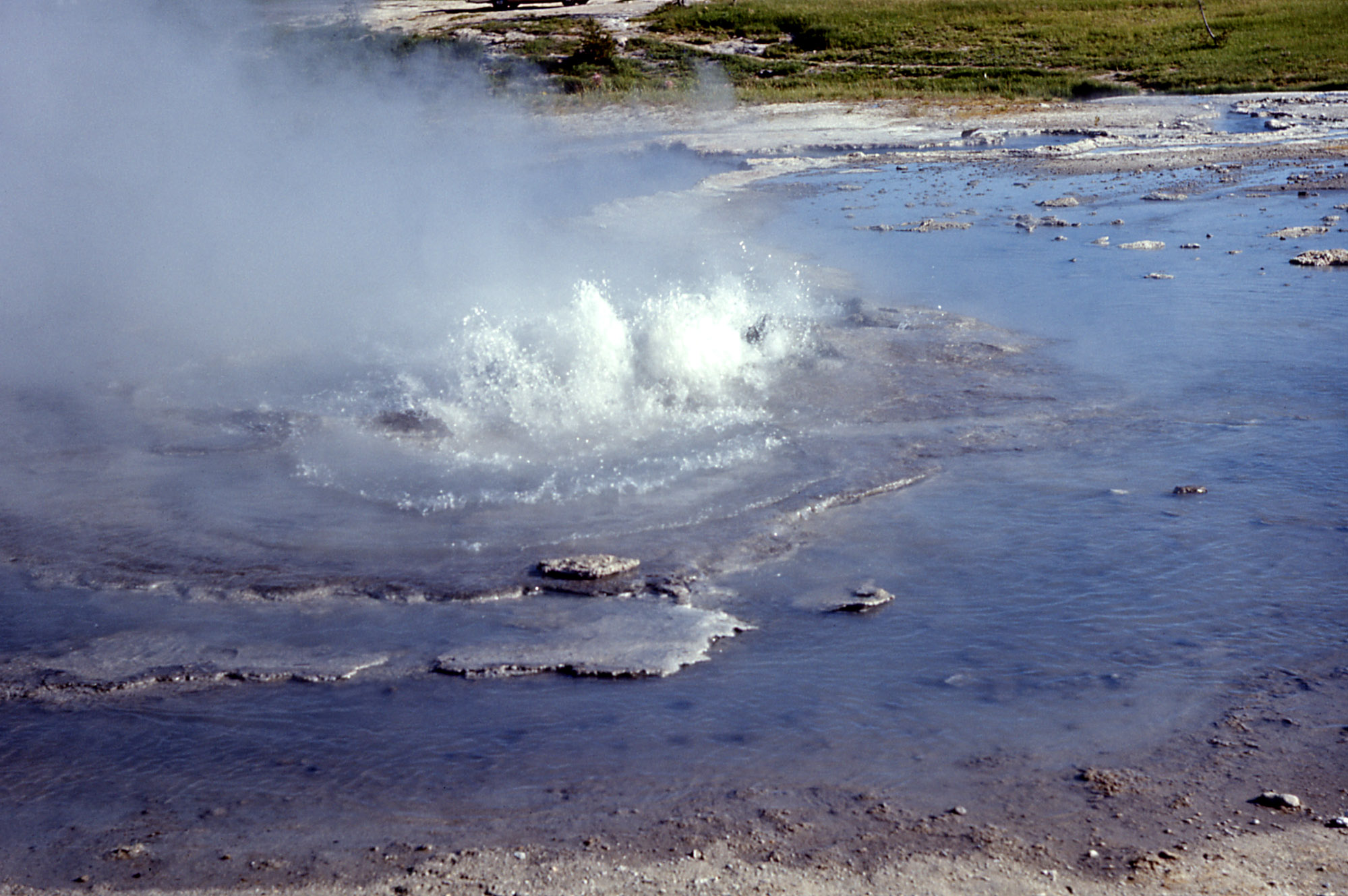
- Ojo Caliente Spring, 1967
- Interactive map of Ojo Caliente Spring
- Location: Lower Geyser Basin, Yellowstone National Park, Wyoming
- Coordinates: 44.5629852°N 110.8388101°W
- Elevation: 7,182 feet (2,189 m)
- Temperature: 94 °C (201 °F)

Ojo Caliente Spring is a hot spring in Lower Geyser Basin, of Yellowstone National Park. It is in the River Group which includes Azure Spring, and is located a few yards off the Fountain Flats Freight Road on the northern bank of the Firehole River.

In Spanish Ojo Caliente means "hot eye". It is a superheated, alkaline spring which, on its northern end, boils constantly to a height of 12 to 20 inches (30 to 51 cm).
