= Opal Pool =

Hot spring in the Midway Geyser Basin of Yellowstone National Park, Wyoming

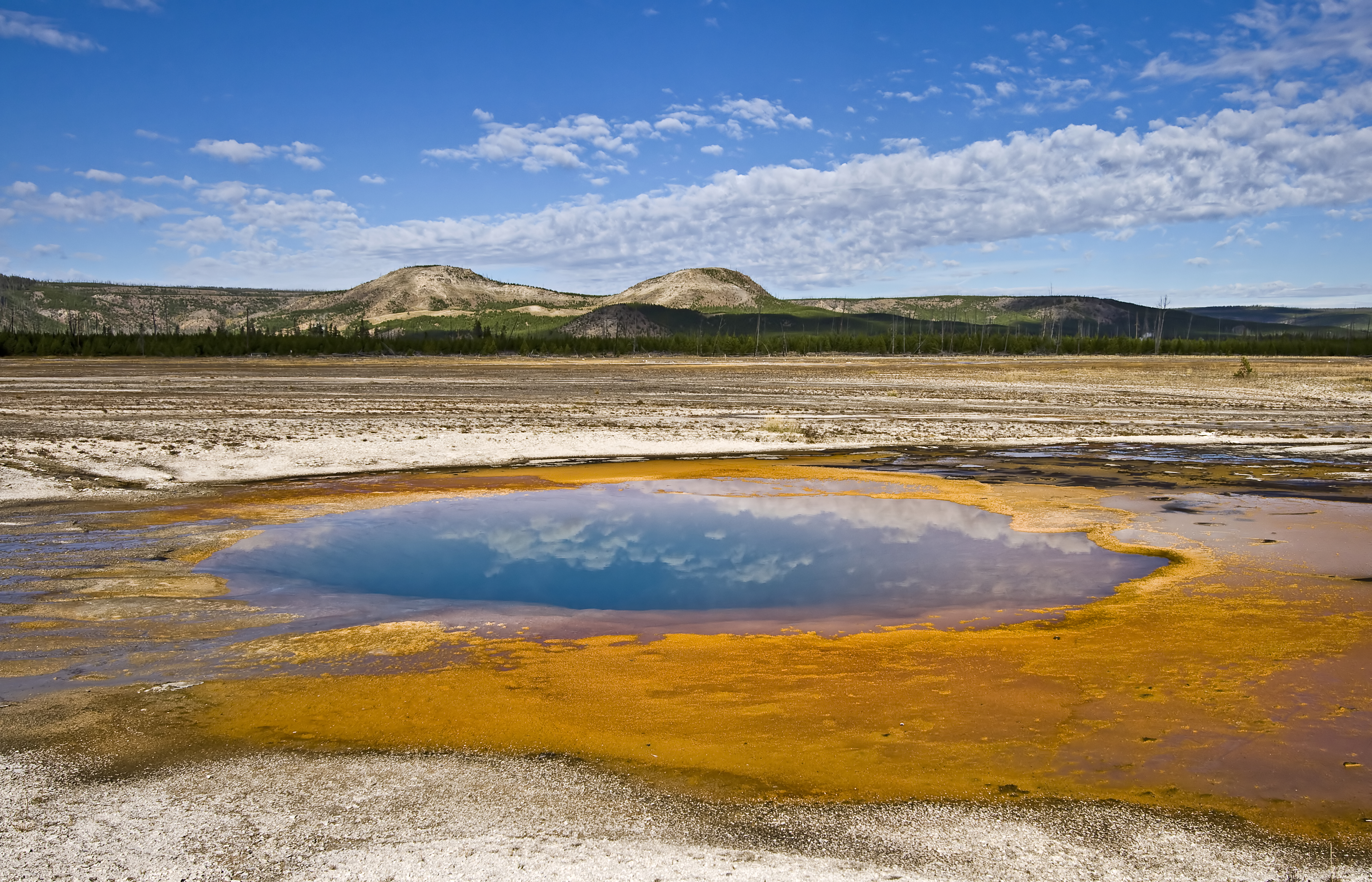
- Opal Pool
- Interactive map of Opal Pool
- Location: Yellowstone National Park, Teton County, Wyoming, USA
- Coordinates: 44.526673°N 110.83879°W
- Elevation: 7,250 feet (2,210 m)
- Type: Fountain geyser
- Eruption height: 20–70 ft (6.1–21.3 m)
- Frequency: Rare
- Duration: 1 minute
- Temperature: 132 °F (56 °C)

Opal Pool is a hot spring in the Midway Geyser Basin of Yellowstone National Park, Wyoming. Opal Pool usually has a temperature of approximately 132 °F (56 °C). Though usually active as a hot spring, Opal Pool is considered a fountain-type geyser.

The first recorded eruption of Opal Pool was in 1947, recurring in 1949, 1952 and 1953, then ceasing. Eruptions resumed in 1979, happening at least once in most following years. Eruption heights are typically under 30 feet (9.1 m) in height, but some eruptions have been seen with heights of 70 feet (21 m) to 80 feet (24 m). Eruptions occur suddenly following visible convection in the pool, but are unpredictable. An eruption consists of one huge burst that throws water 20–80 feet high, making Opal Pool the largest active geyser at Midway Geyser Basin. Much smaller splashes seconds apart stretch the total duration to about 1 minute. In 2005 Opal completely drained, but refilled as a vivid green pool in 2008.

== See also ==
- List of Yellowstone geothermal features
- Yellowstone National Park
- Geothermal areas of Yellowstone
