= Bulger Geyser =

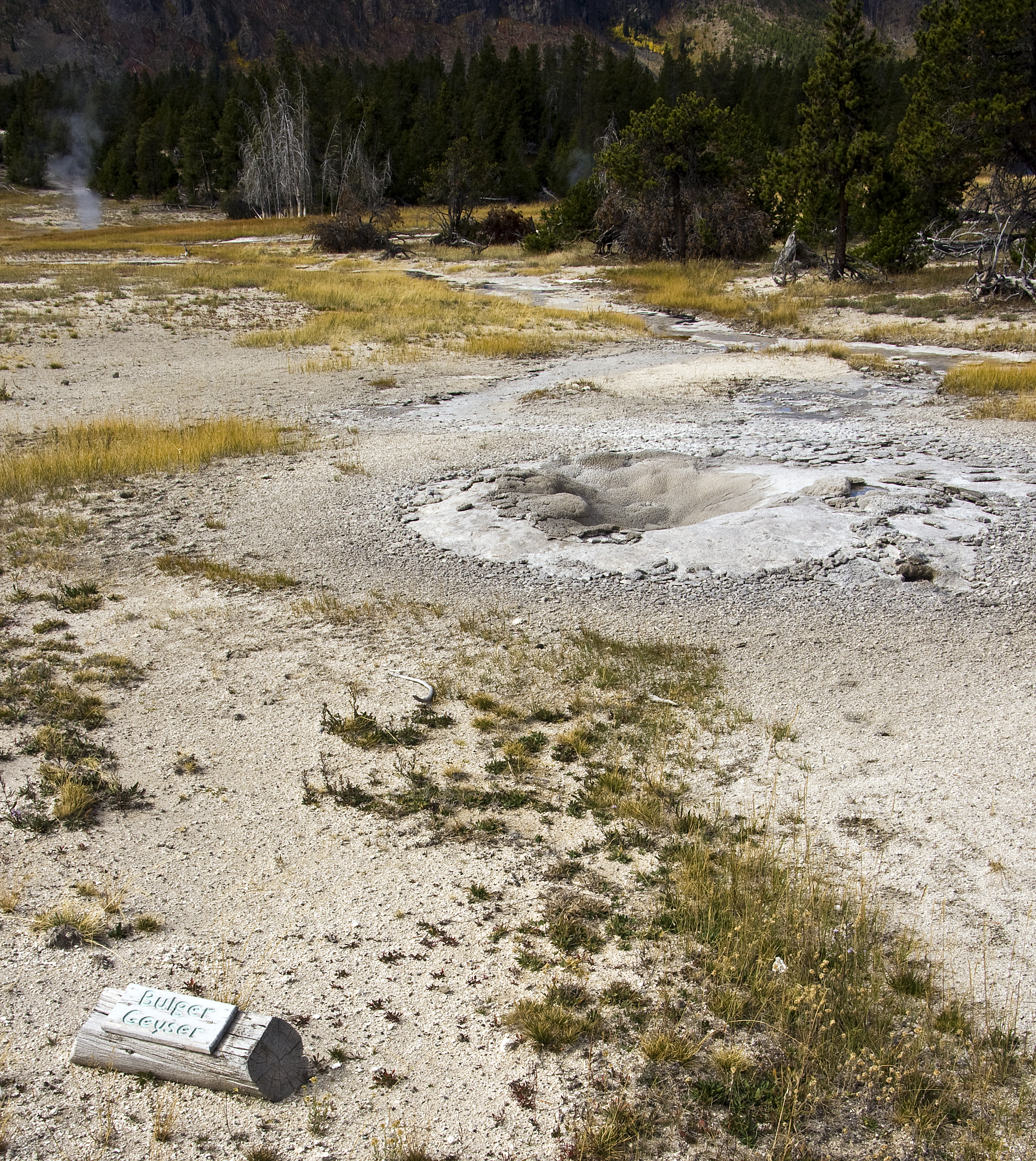
- Bulger Geyser's crater in 2010
- Interactive map of Bulger Geyser
- Location: Yellowstone National Park, Teton County, Wyoming, USA
- Coordinates: 44°27′58″N 110°50′13″W
- Elevation: 7,333 feet (2,235 m)
- Type: Fountain geyser
- Eruption height: 1–12 feet (0.30–3.66 m)
- Frequency: Frequent
- Duration: Seconds to Minutes
- Temperature: 198 °F (92 °C)

Bulger Geyser is located in the Upper Geyser Basin of Yellowstone National Park, Wyoming. Bulger Geyser is 200 feet (61 m) south of Grand Geyser. It erupts frequently, with both major and minor eruptions. As with most geysers, the minor eruptions are the most common. They have a duration of seconds. Major eruptions are infrequent, but they have durations as long as 12 minutes. Either way, the play consists of somewhat vigorous bursting 1–12 feet high.

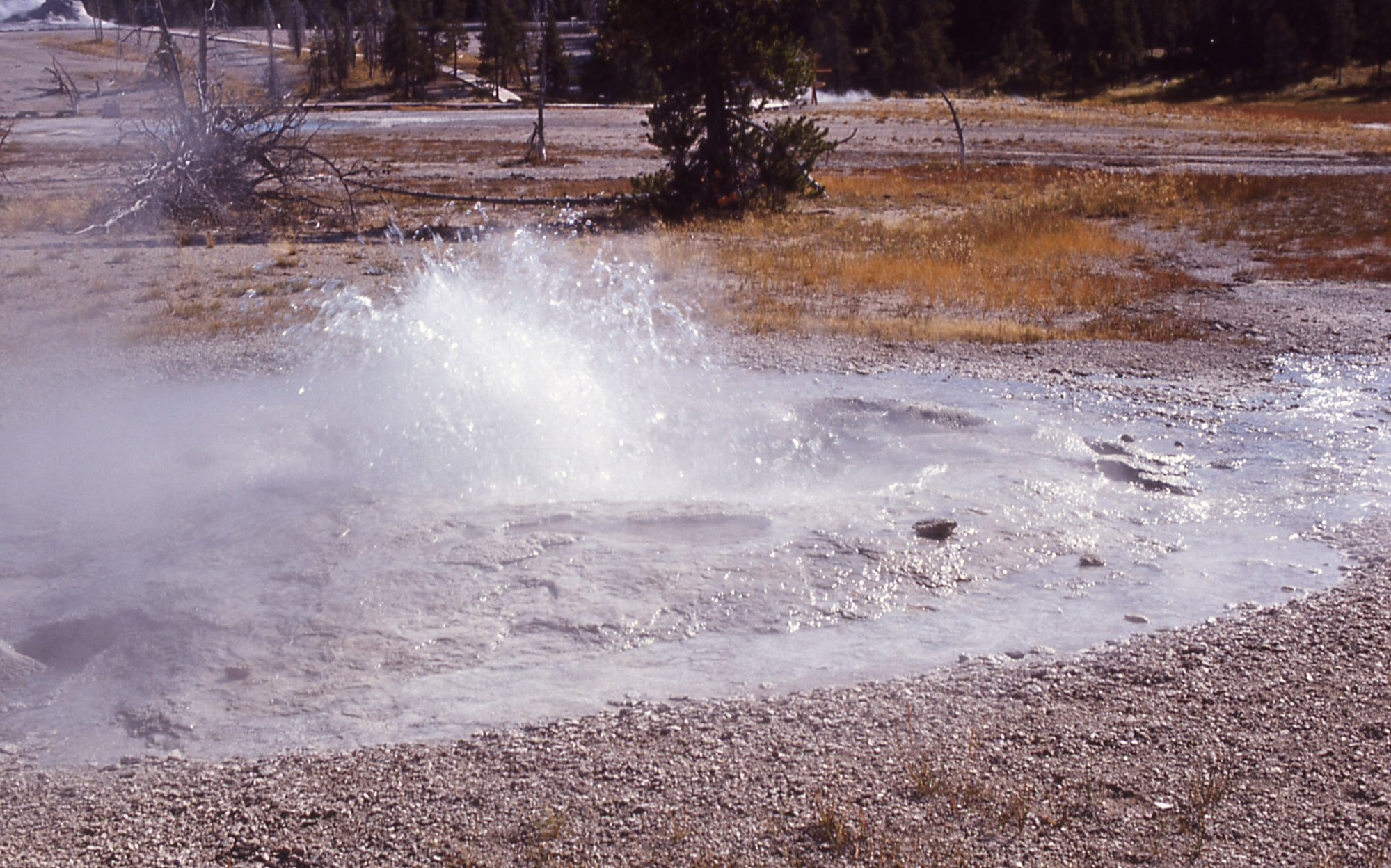
Bulger Geyser during an eruption in 1964

== See also ==
- List of Yellowstone geothermal features
- Yellowstone National Park
- Geothermal areas of Yellowstone
