= Belgian Pool =

Hot spring in Yellowstone National Park

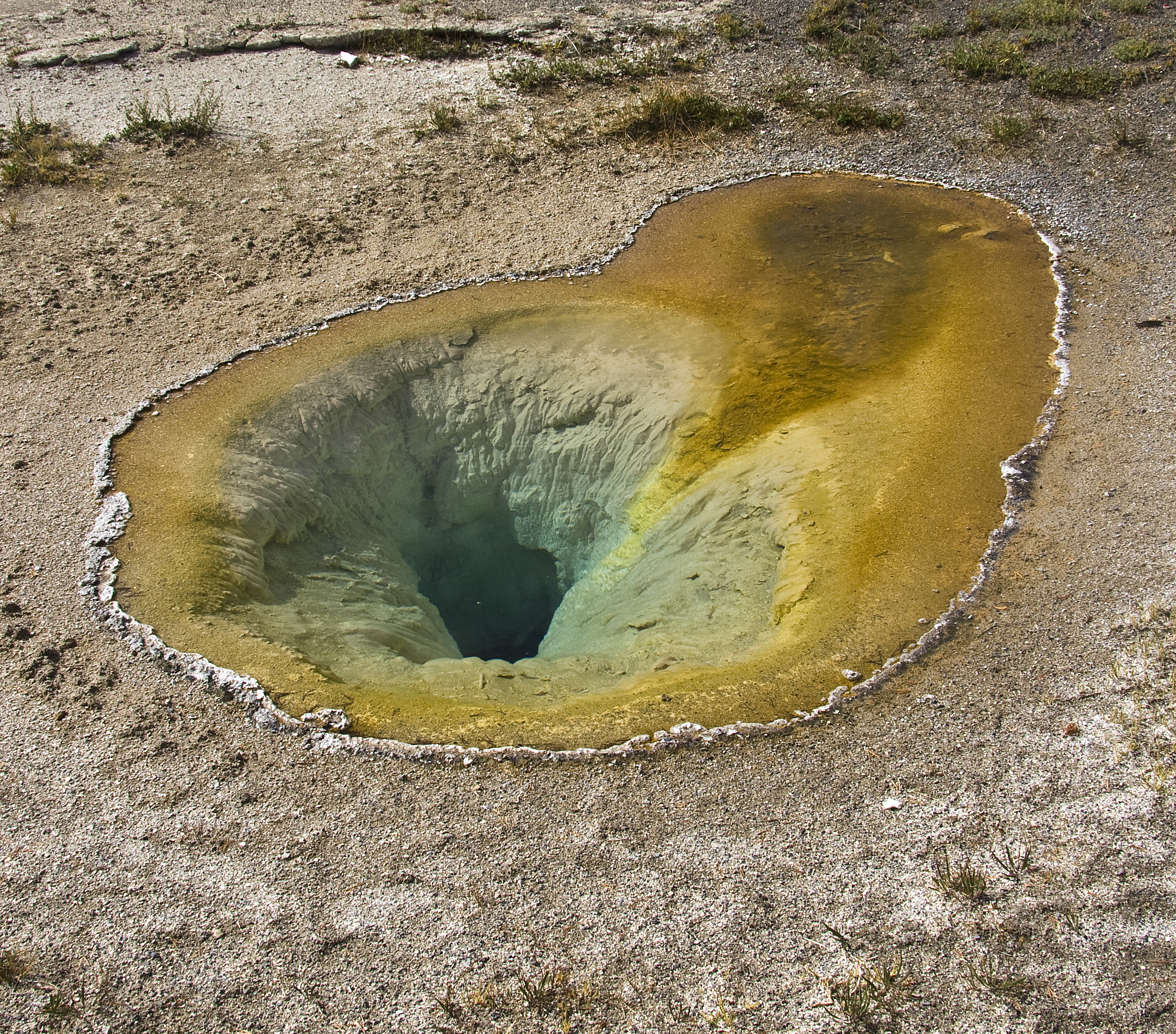
- Belgian Pool
- Interactive map of Belgian Pool
- Location: Yellowstone National Park, Teton County, Wyoming, USA
- Coordinates: 44°27′58″N 110°50′12″W
- Elevation: 7,339 feet (2,237 m)
- Type: Hot Spring
- Temperature: 180 °F (82 °C)

Belgian Pool is a hot spring in the Upper Geyser Basin of Yellowstone National Park, Wyoming. Originally named Oyster Spring, it was renamed after a visitor from Belgium fell into it in 1929 with fatal results. The spring is less hot than other features in the area, at about 180 °F (82 °C), but still sufficiently hot for severe thermal burns. References to a "Belgian Geyser" in the 1930s may refer to this feature.

== See also ==
- List of Yellowstone geothermal features
- Yellowstone National Park
- Geothermal areas of Yellowstone
