= Anemone Geyser =

Geyser in the Upper Geyser Basin of Yellowstone National Park

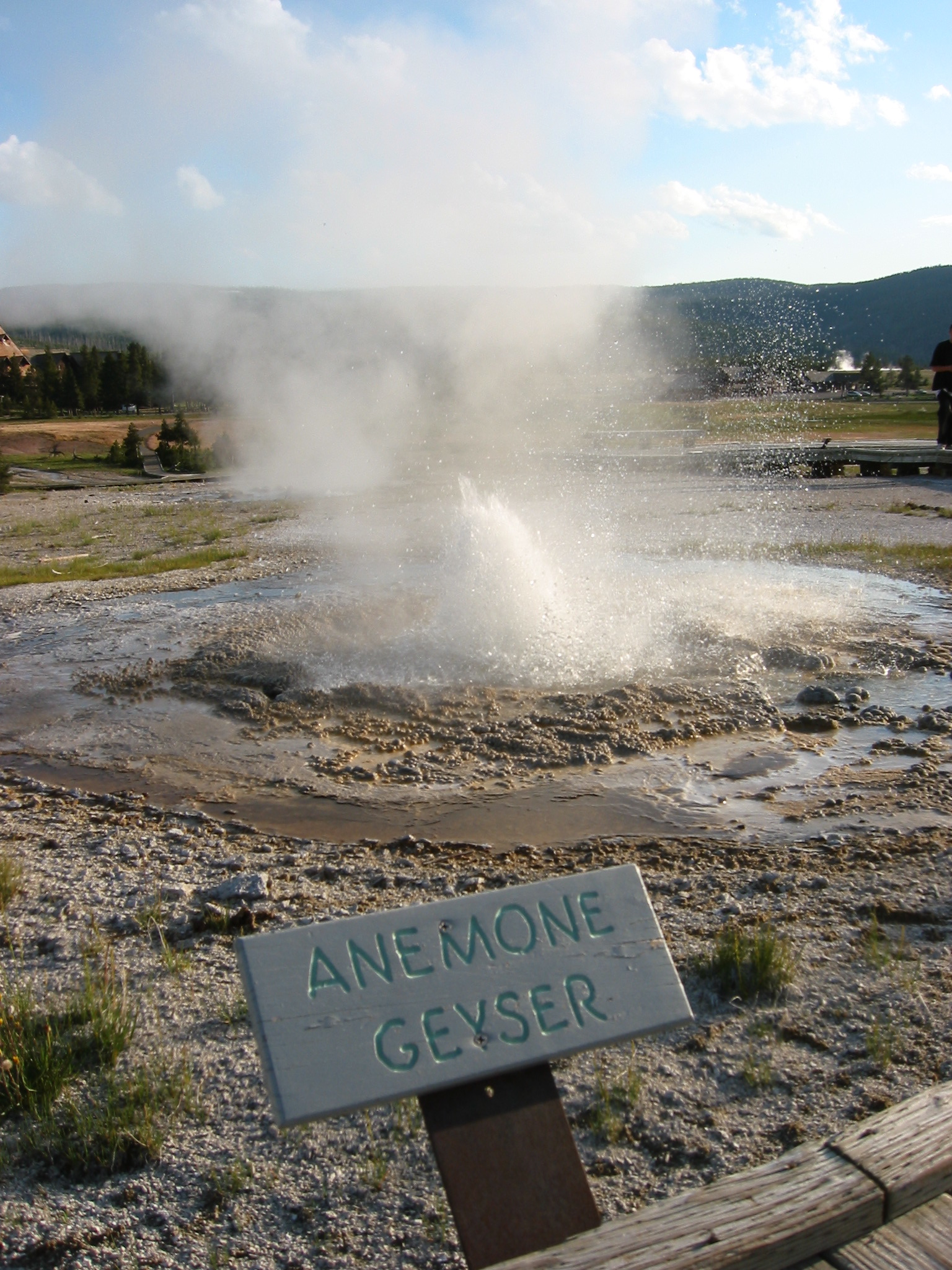
- Anemone Geyser
- Interactive map of Anemone Geyser
- Name origin: Hague Party, 1904
- Location: Upper Geyser Basin, Yellowstone National Park, Teton County, Wyoming
- Coordinates: 44°27′46″N 110°49′44″W
- Type: Fountain geyser
- Eruption height: 6 feet (1.8 m) - 8 feet (2.4 m) (Big Anemone); 4 feet (1.2 m) (Little Anemone)
- Frequency: 6–10 minutes (Big Anemone); 6–35 minutes (Little Anemone)
- Duration: 25–45 seconds (Big Anemone); 1–30 minutes (Little Anemone)
- Temperature: 193 °F (89 °C)

The Anemone Geysers are two geysers in the Upper Geyser Basin of Yellowstone National Park, alongside the majority of the world's active geysers, including Old Faithful, in the United States. They are located ten feet from each other, sometimes appearing independent, but with behavior that suggests both geysers are connected. The geysers are often compared to sea anemones, displaying pools with smooth, round sinter in them.

The larger geyser is known as Big or North Anemone. The smaller geyser is known as Little or South Anemone. Both geysers were named after the anemone flower by the Hague Party in 1904. Both vents have a pale yellow color and a shape similar to the anemone flower.

== Geology ==
Big Anemone has eruptions lasting 25 to 45 seconds every 6 to 10 minutes, reaching a height of 6 to 8 feet (1.8 to 2.4 m). Water can be heard rising in the crater prior to eruption. After an eruption, the water quickly retreats into the crater.

Little Anemone has less vigorous but longer-lasting eruptions. The interval between eruptions can vary from 6 to 35 minutes, and eruptions can last from less than a minute to more than 30 minutes. Eruptions from Little Anemone rarely reach more than 4 feet (1.2 m) in height. On occasion, the crater will fill with water, then drain without erupting.

Little Anemone also experiences near non-stop activity. This causes Big Anemone to experience long intervals and weak eruptions. The Anemone geysers are part of the weekly Geyser Hill wave, increasing and decreasing their interval and duration over the course of a week or multiples of one week.

== See also ==
- List of Yellowstone geothermal features
