= Abyss Pool =

Hot spring in Yellowstone National Park, US

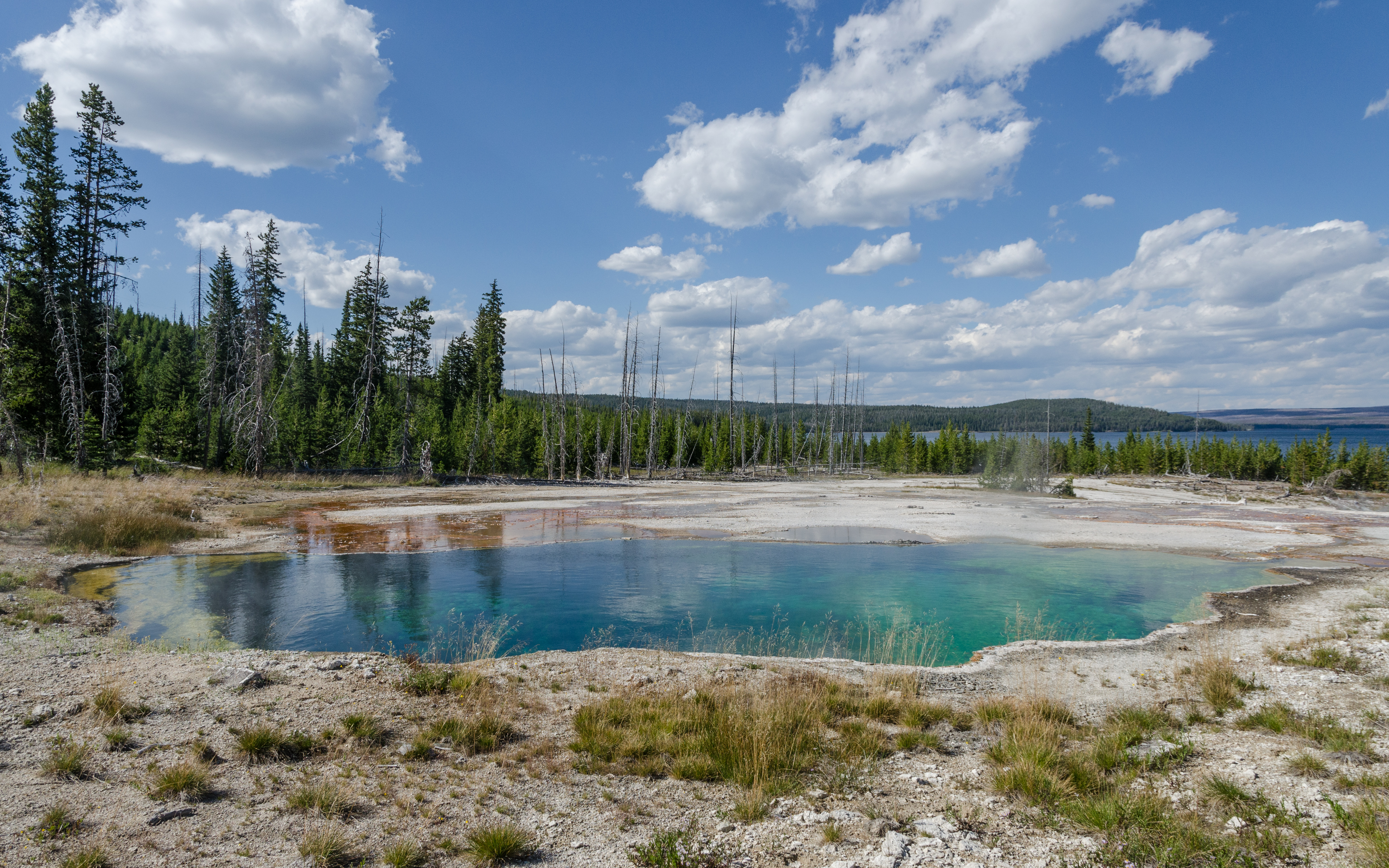
- Abyss Pool

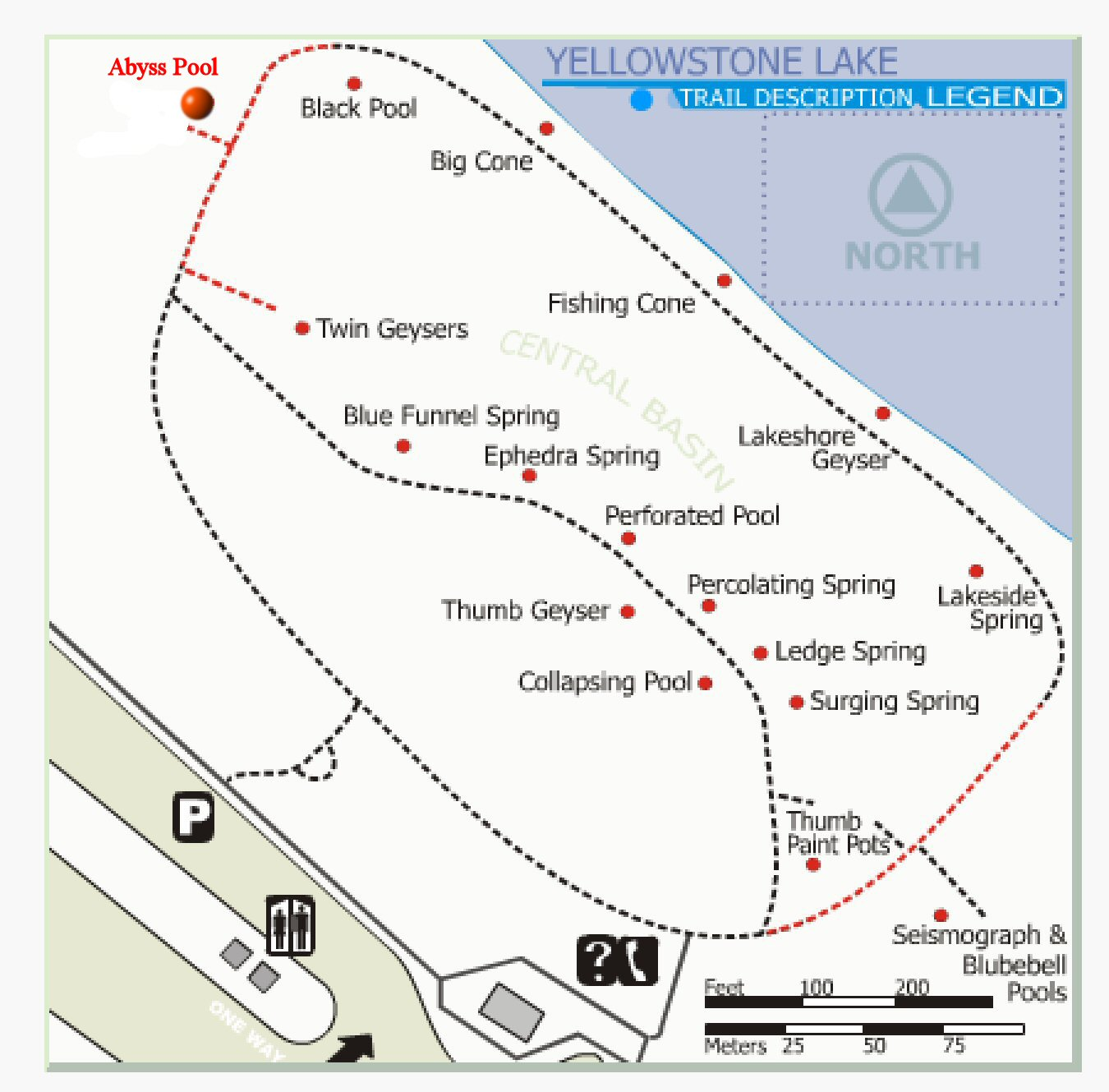
- West Thumb Geyser Basin
- Name origin: Chief Park Naturalist Clyde M. Bauer
- Location: West Thumb Geyser Basin, Yellowstone National Park, Teton County, Wyoming
- Coordinates: 44°25′06″N 110°34′21″W
- Type: Hot spring pool
- Temperature: 181 °F (83 °C)
- Depth: 53 feet (16 m)

Abyss Pool is a hot spring in the West Thumb Geyser Basin of Yellowstone National Park in the United States.

== History ==
The pool was named by Chief Park Naturalist Clyde M. Bauer, possibly after a reference to Lieutenant G.C. Doane's 1870 description of a spring in this area which spoke of the visibility of objects in the "deep abysses" of the pool. A visitor in 1883 described it as "a great, pure, sparkling sapphire rippling with heat.".

== Geology ==
Abyss Pool has a depth of 53 feet (16 m). The pool erupted for the first time in recorded history between August 1987 and September 1991 and again between December 1991 and June 1992. The eruptions were between 30 feet (9.1 m) and 100 feet (30 m) high. Since 1992, the pool has returned to its non-eruptive state.

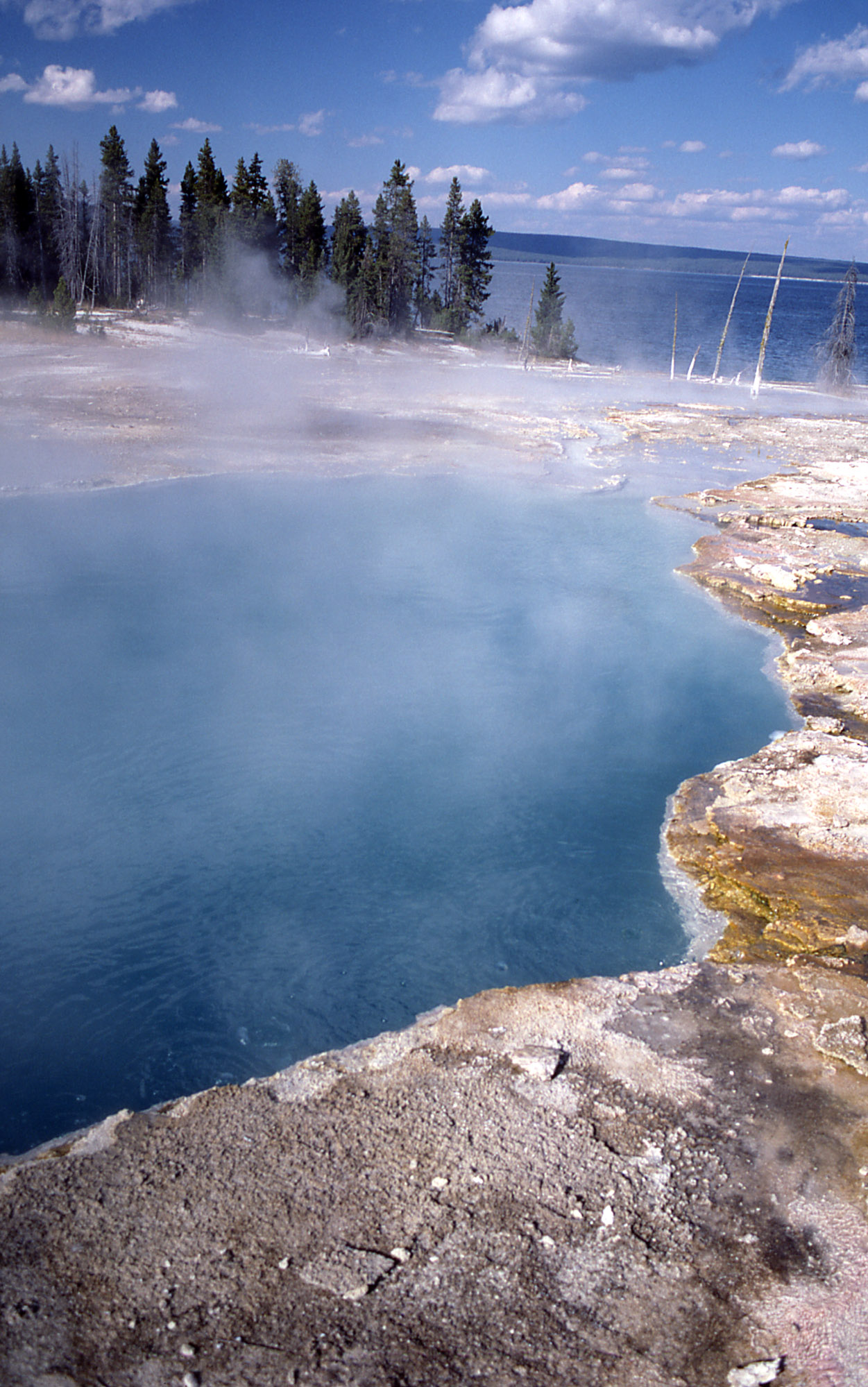
Abyss Pool with Yellowstone Lake in the background.

== See also ==
- List of Yellowstone geothermal features
