= West Triplet Geyser =

Geyser in the Upper Geyser Basin of Yellowstone National Park

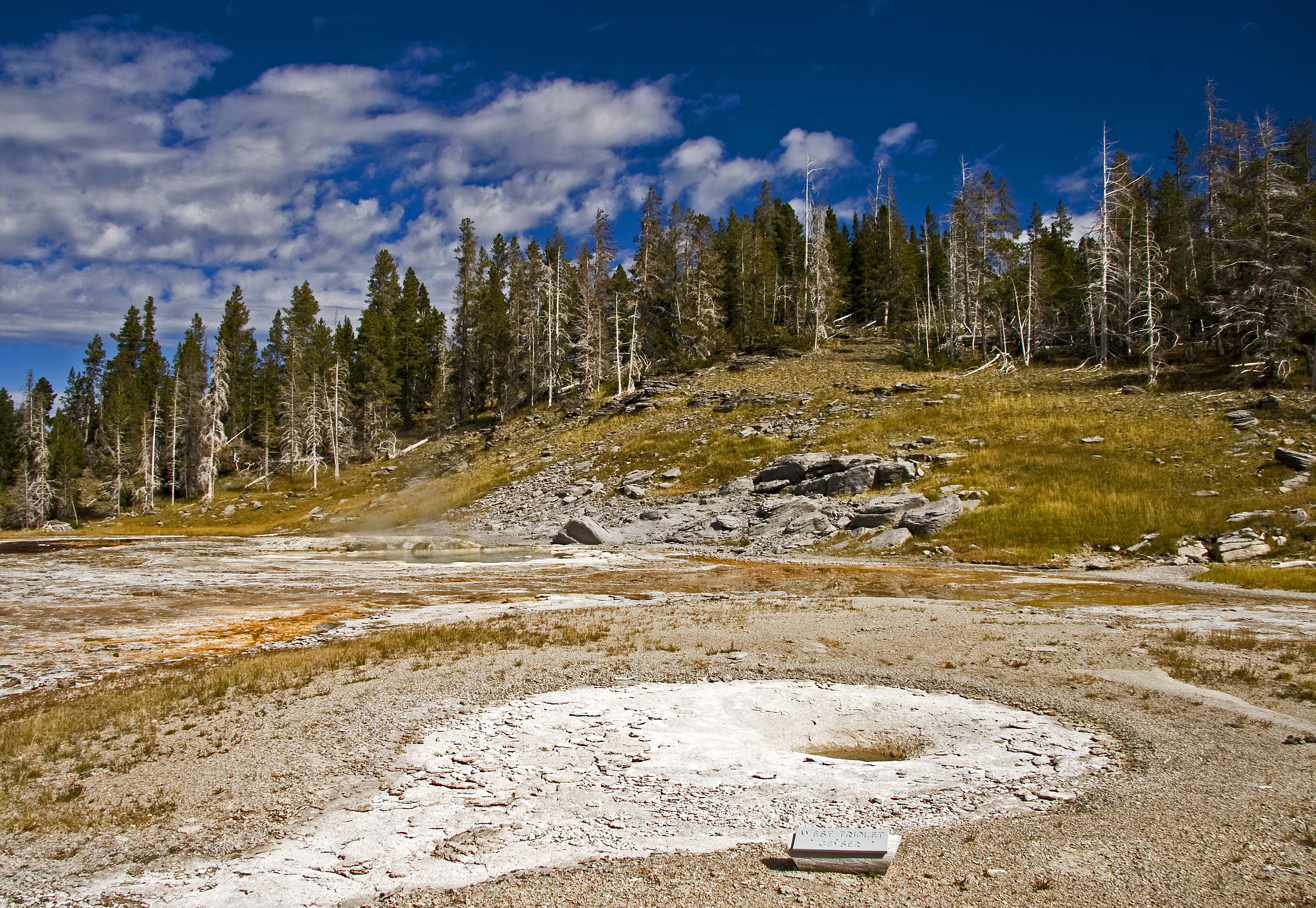
- West Triplet Geyser's crater
- Interactive map of West Triplet Geyser
- Location: Yellowstone National Park, Teton County, Wyoming, USA
- Coordinates: 44.466378°N 110.8369979°E
- Elevation: 7,342 feet (2,238 m)
- Type: Fountain geyser
- Eruption height: 1–10 ft (0.30–3.05 m)
- Frequency: hours to days
- Duration: minutes to hours
- Temperature: 87 °C (189 °F)

West Triplet Geyser is a geyser in the Upper Geyser Basin of Yellowstone National Park, Wyoming. West Triplet Geyser is 85 feet (26 m) south of Grand Geyser. Its activity is related to that of Grand and Rift geysers. West Triplet erupts to a height of about 10 feet (3.0 m), usually during Grand's quiet periods. Before 1947 it displayed regular activity, erupting about every three hours.

== See also ==
- List of Yellowstone geothermal features
- Yellowstone National Park
- Geothermal areas of Yellowstone
