= Ear Spring =

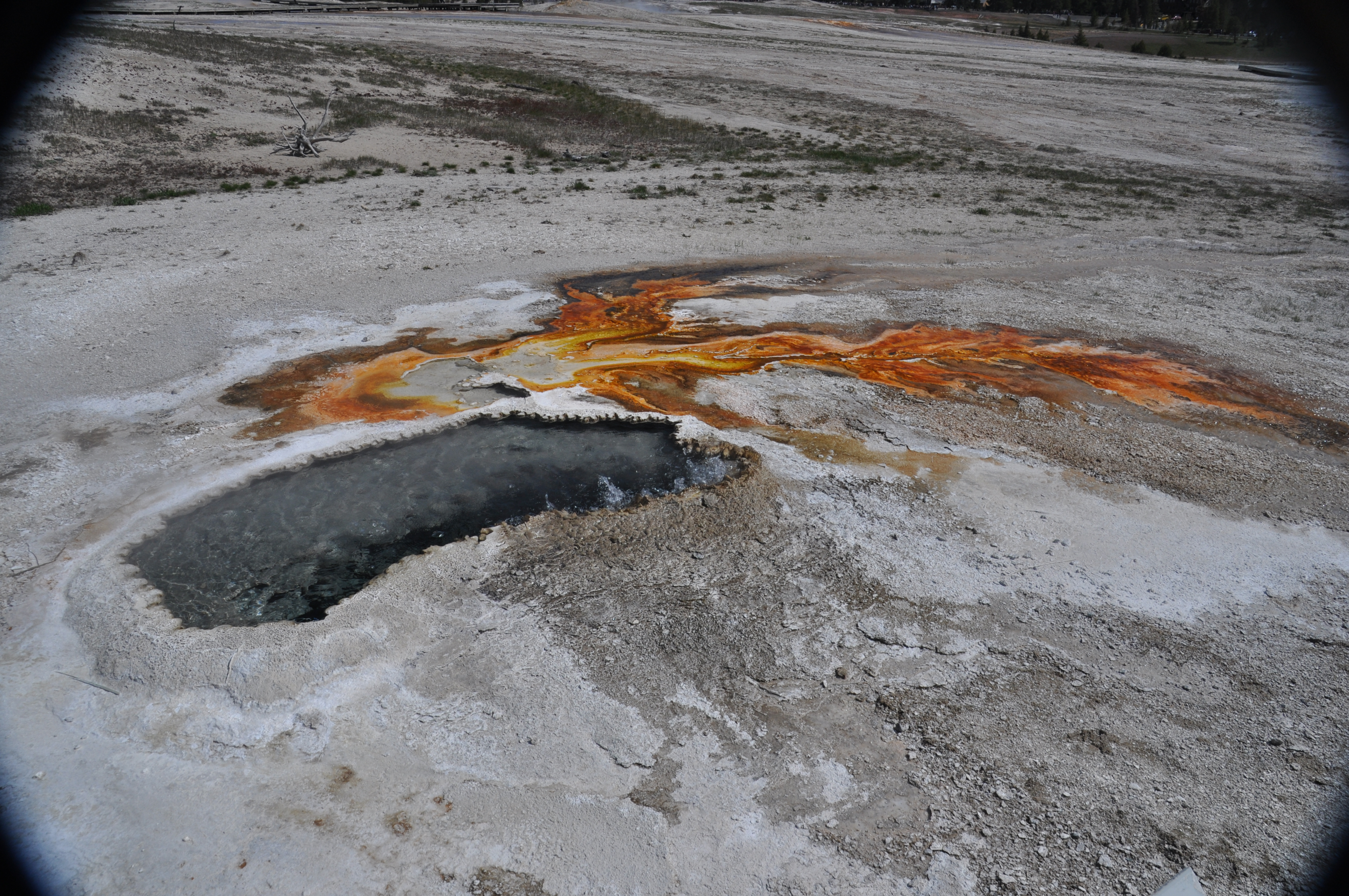
- Ear Spring in 2013
- Interactive map of Ear Spring
- Location: Upper Geyser Basin, Yellowstone National Park, Teton County, Wyoming
- Coordinates: 44°27′50″N 110°49′51″W
- Elevation: 7,356 feet (2,242 m)
- Type: Hot Spring
- Eruption height: 1–30 ft (0.30–9.14 m)
- Frequency: rare

Ear Spring is a hot spring in the Upper Geyser Basin of Yellowstone National Park in the United States. Located close to Old Faithful, on rare occasions Ear Spring will erupt as a geyser, and can shoot rocks and debris as well as water more than 25 feet (7.6 m) for a few minutes. On September 15, 2018, Ear Spring was seen on the National Park Service webcam at Old Faithful erupting for a minute and reached heights of 20 to 30 ft (6.1 to 9.1 m). This was the largest eruption the pool may have had since 1957. The eruption tossed small rocks out along with trash that people had thrown in it over the years and the heated water killed the surrounding bacterial mats that normally thrive in less heated conditions. Likely related to the eruption of Ear Spring, a new thermal feature opened up under the pedestrian boardwalk near Pump Geyser which resulted in the National Park Service temporarily closing off the boardwalk. This new thermal feature was spouting water the night of September 18–19, 2018. Additionally, Doublet Pool and North Goggles Geyser have both been more active in the period immediately after the rare eruption of Ear Spring.

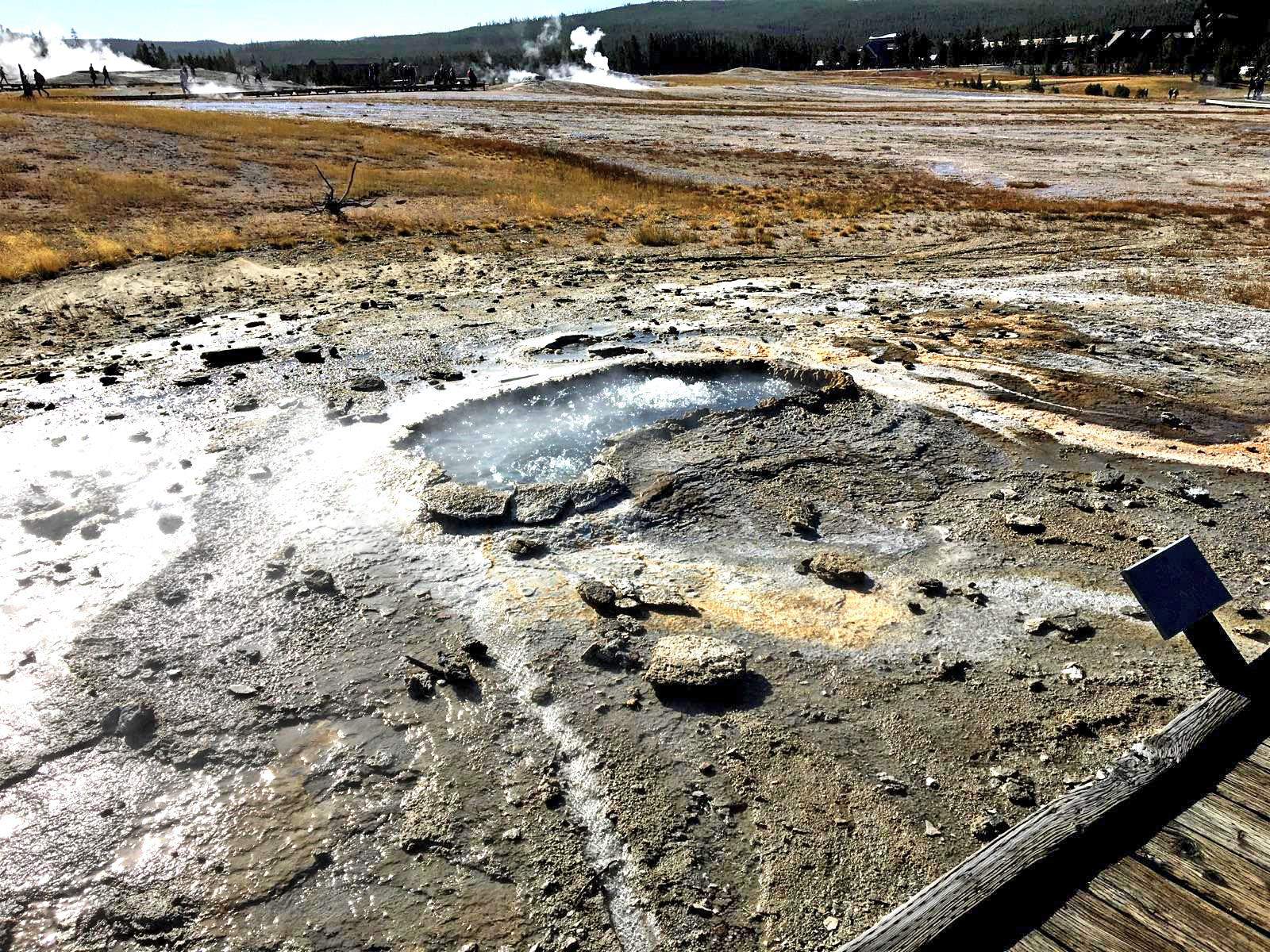
Ear Spring in September 2018 showing areas where bacterial mats had been killed (compared to image of 2013) and rocks spouted out of the spring after a rare eruption on September 15, 2018

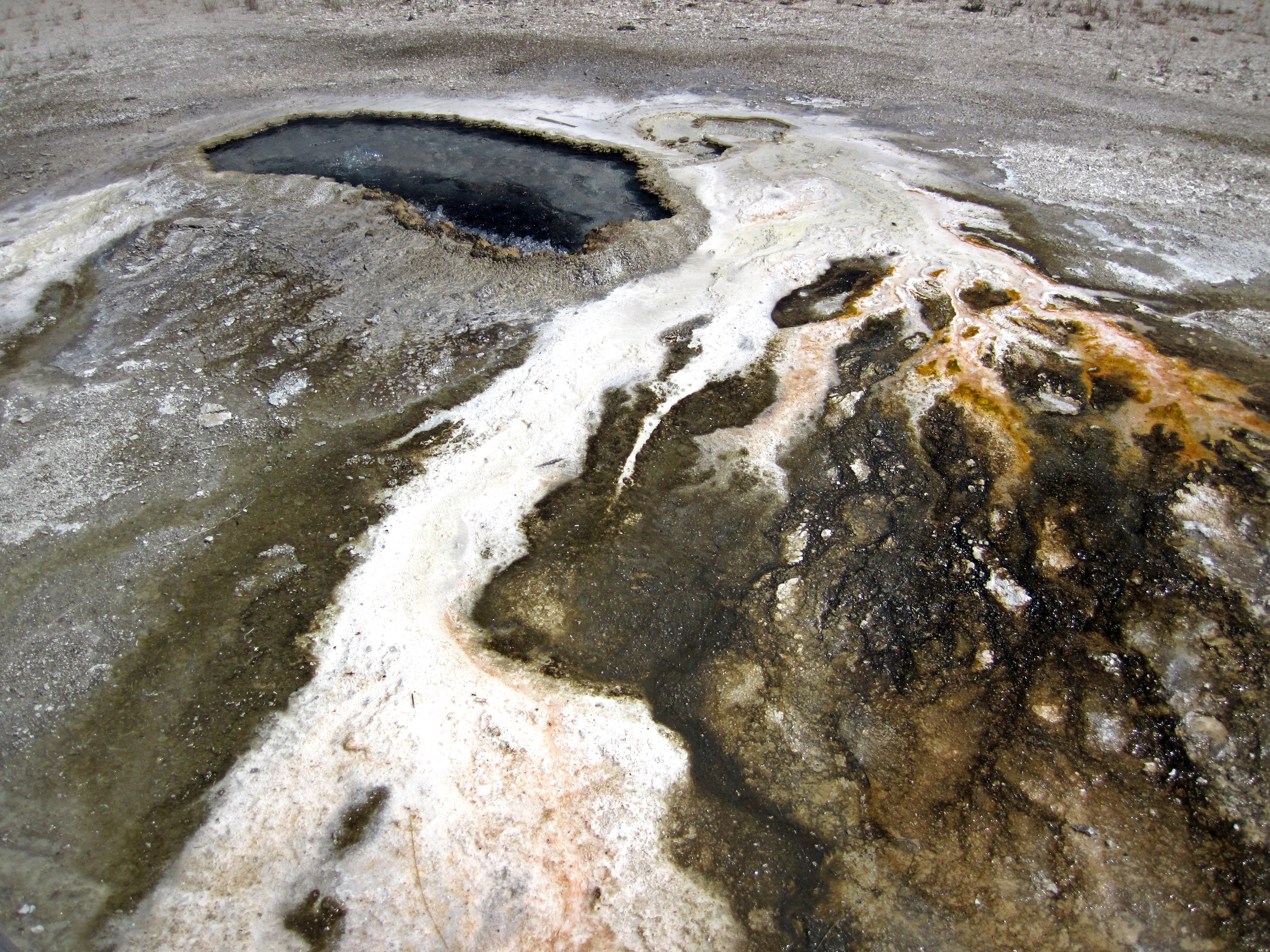
Ear Spring in August 2018, a month before its eruption. Note the white areas where there used to be bacterial mats in the image of 2013
