= Lone Star Geyser =

Geyser in Yellowstone National Park

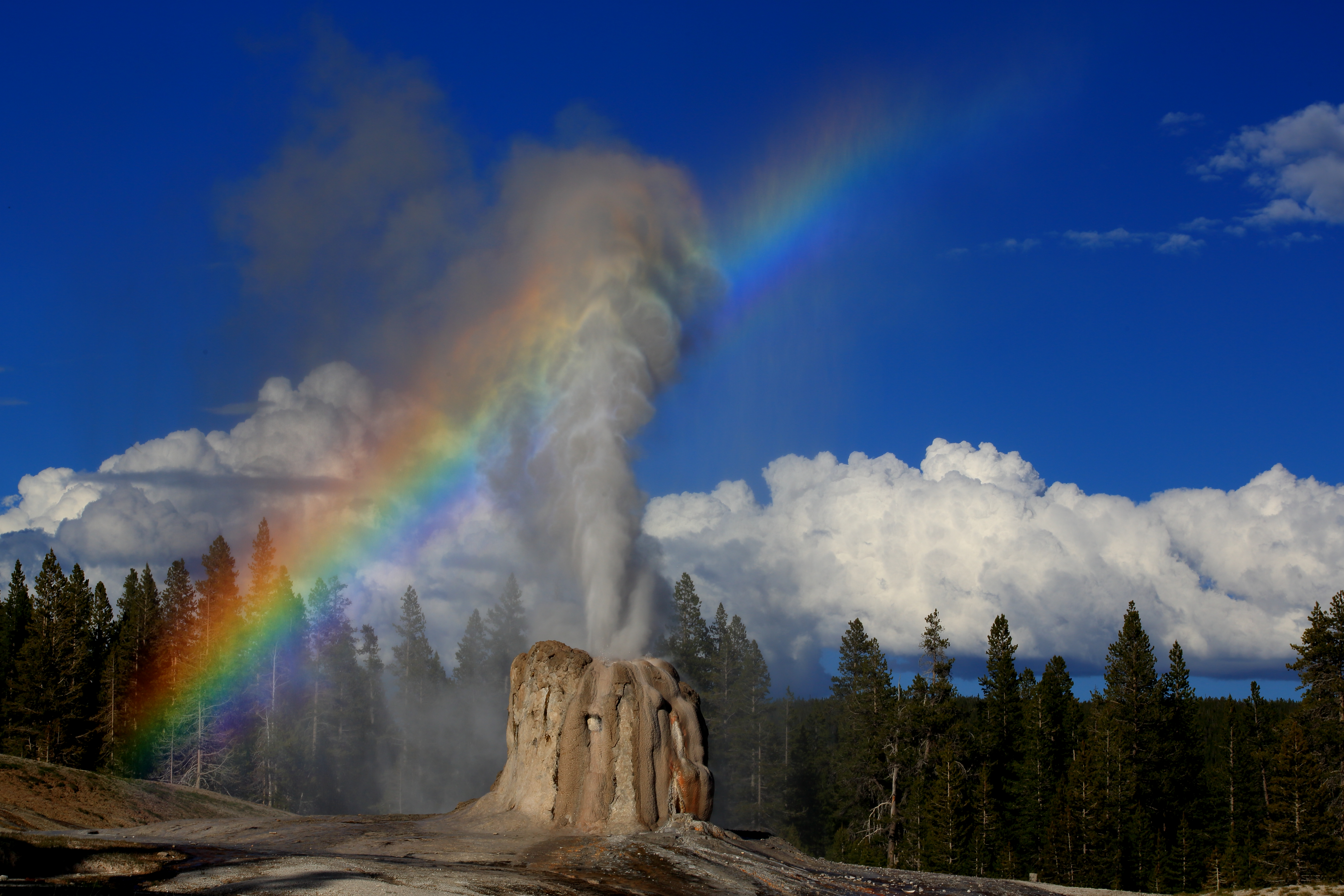
- Lone Star Geyser
- Interactive map of Lone Star Geyser
- Location: Lone Star Geyser Basin, Yellowstone National Park, Teton County, Wyoming
- Coordinates: 44.4183461°N 110.8067286°W
- Elevation: 7,644 feet (2,330 m)
- Type: Cone type geyser
- Eruption height: 35–40 ft (11–12 m)
- Frequency: 3 hours
- Duration: 30 minutes

Lone Star Geyser is a cone-type geyser located in the Lone Star Geyser Basin of Yellowstone National Park. The basin is a backcountry geyser basin located 3 miles (4.8 km) southeast of Old Faithful geyser and the Upper Geyser Basin. The geyser is reached via an old service road open to hikers and biking, with the trailhead near Kepler Cascades on the Grand Loop Road.

Lone Star erupts about every 3 hours. Eruptions last about 30 minutes and reach heights of 35 to 40 feet (11 to 12 m).

== History ==
Aubrey L. Haines, the Yellowstone park historian from 1960 to 1969, relates three stories as to how this geyser was named:

- In 1882, two Northern Pacific Railway surveyors working in the Upper Geyser Basin region came upon the geyser and assumed because of its remote location that they were the first to discover it. They named it "Lone Star Geyser" in their notes.
- In 1879, Colonel W. D. Pickett and J.M.V. Cochran, two hunters who had camped near Old Faithful, referred to the geyser as "Lone Star" during a discussion they had with Henry Bird Calfee, a noted Yellowstone photographer, during a later part of their hunting trip.
- The Hayden Geological Survey of 1872 named this geyser Solitary Geyser, but that name was later given to another geyser northeast of Old Faithful.
Images of Lone Star Geyser
Video of a major eruption of Lone Star Geyser

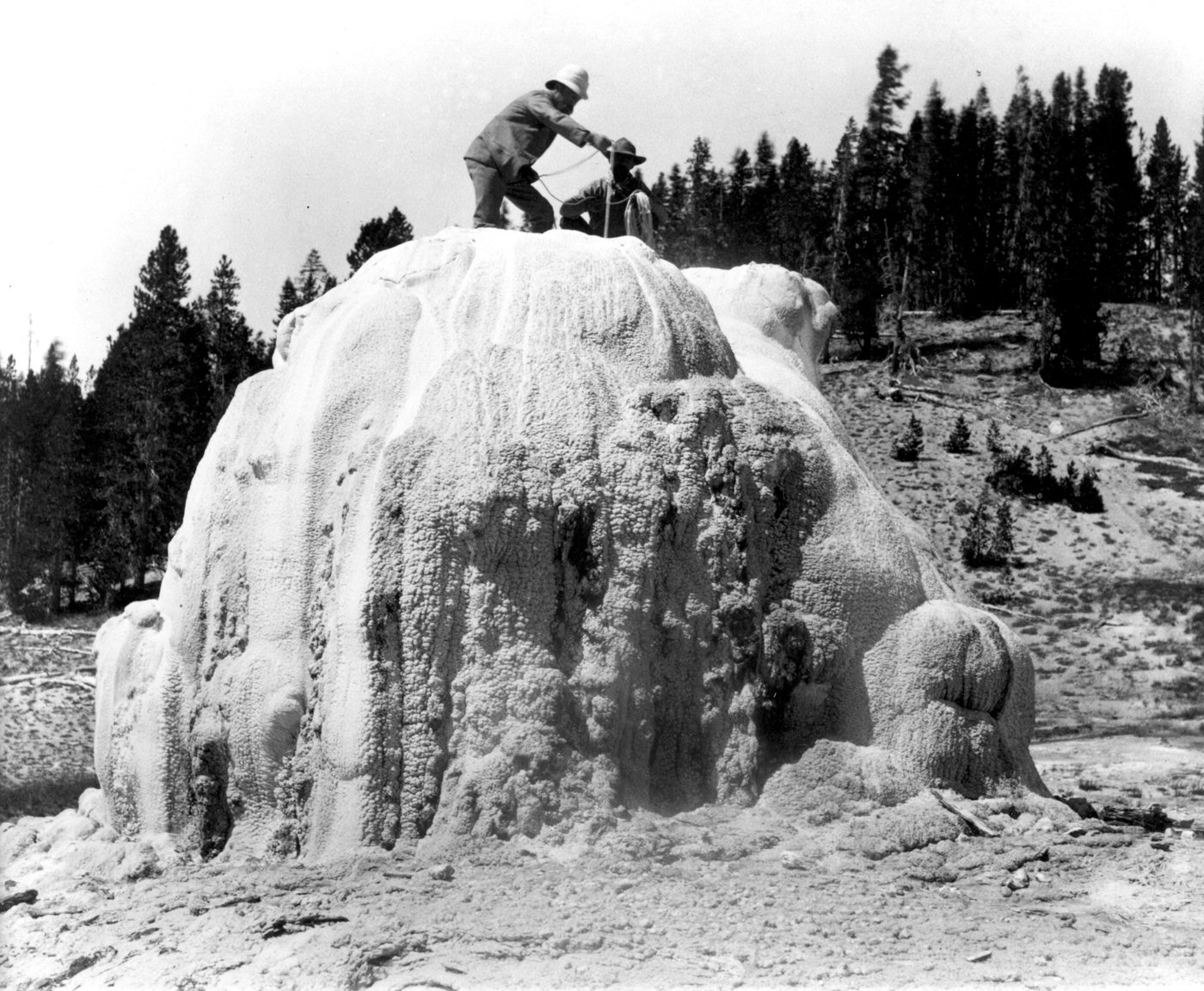
Lone Star Geyser, 1878 William Henry Jackson

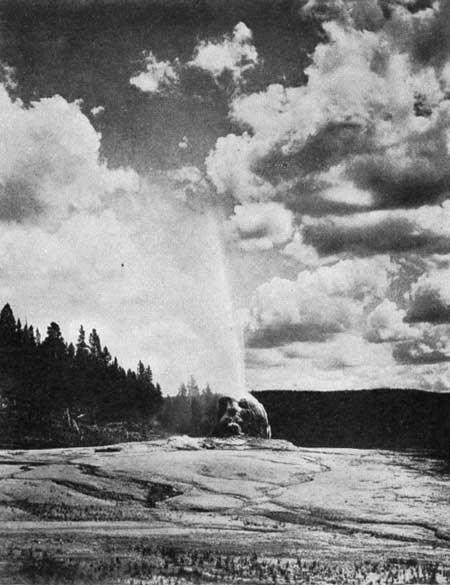
Lone Star Geyser, c. 1900 Frank Jay Haynes

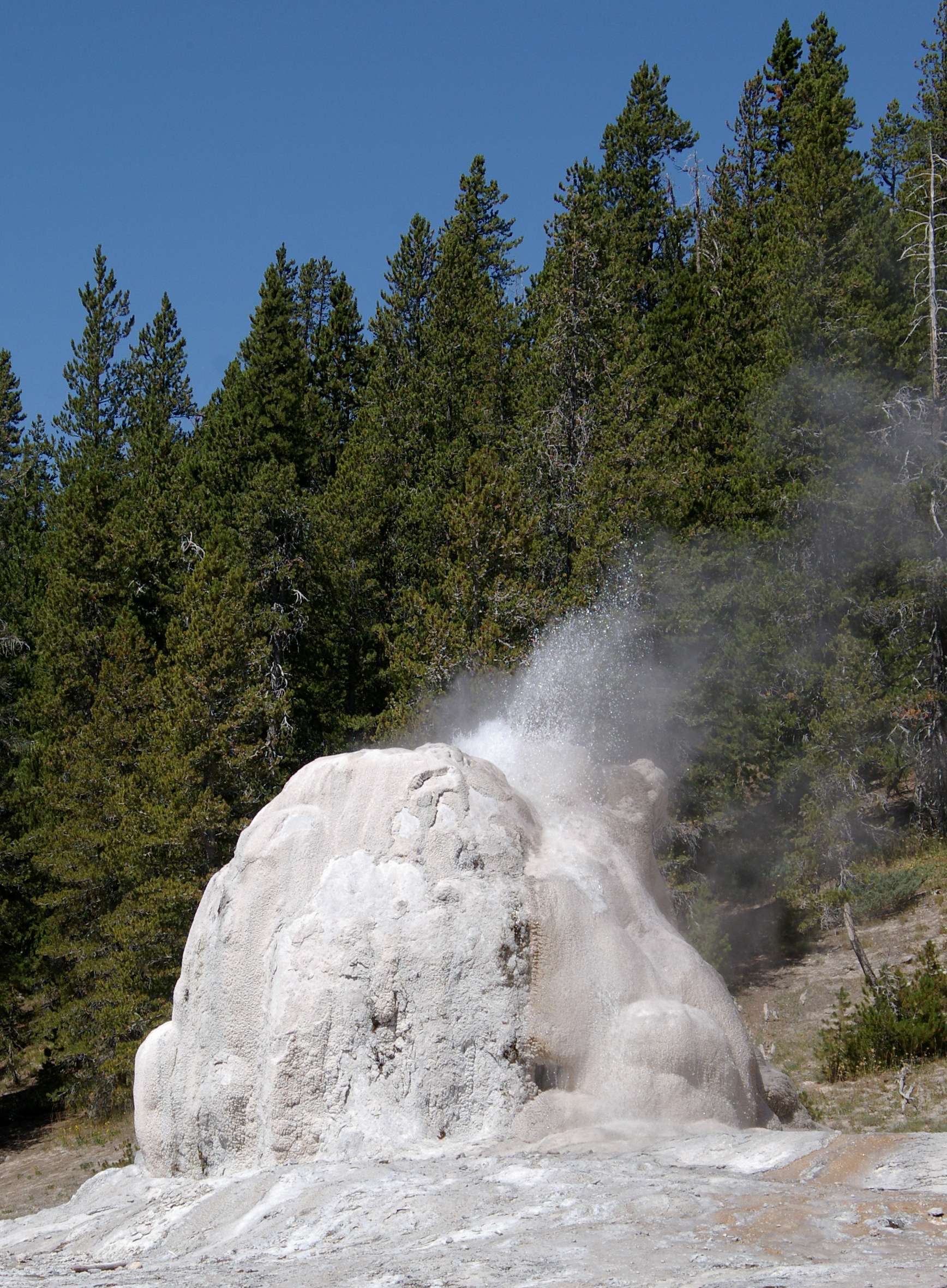
Pre-eruption phase, 2008
