= Turquoise Pool =

Hot spring in the Midway Geyser Basin of Yellowstone National Park, Wyoming

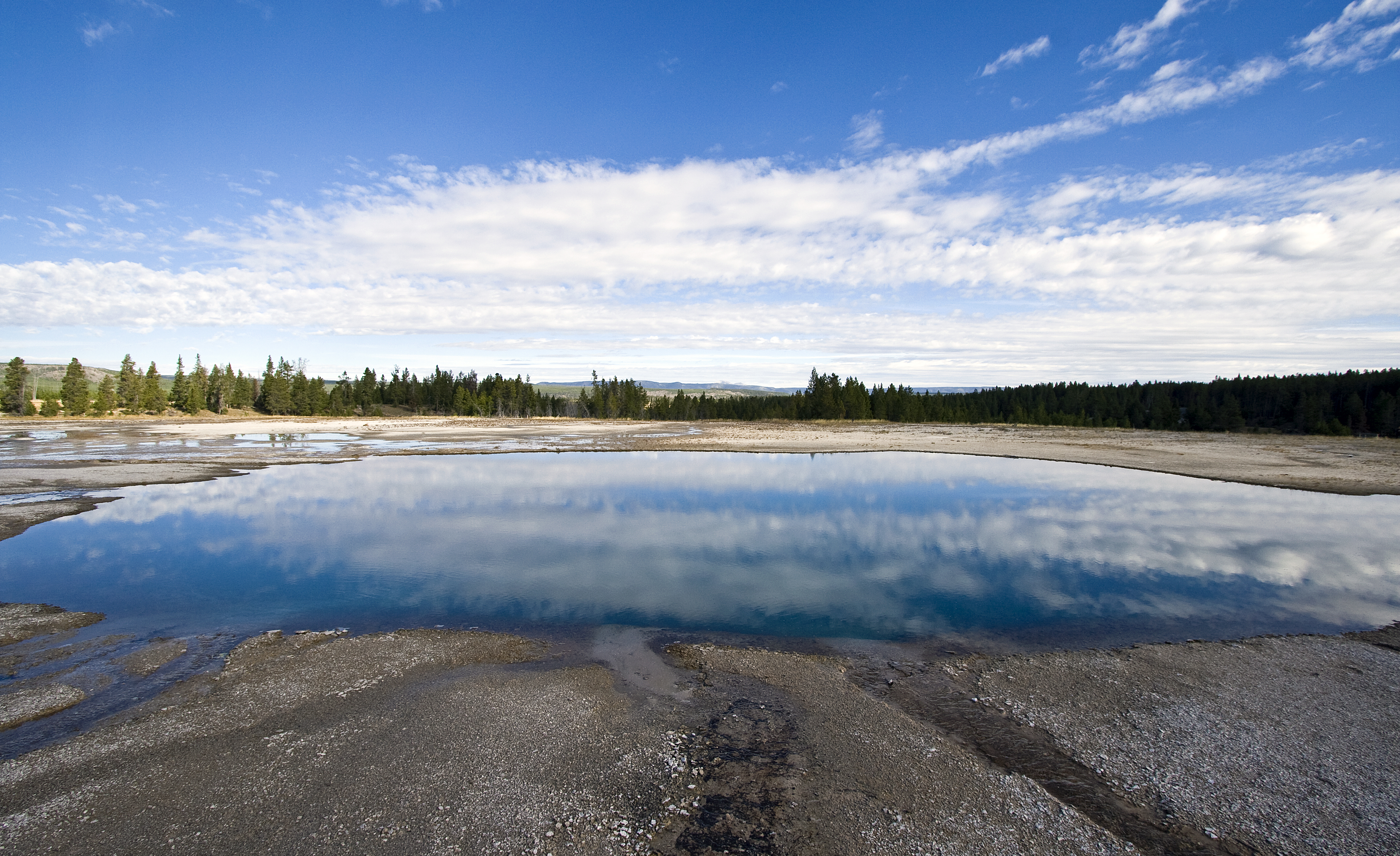
- Turquoise Pool
- Interactive map of Turquoise Pool
- Name origin: Hayden Expedition (1878)
- Location: Yellowstone National Park, Teton County, Wyoming, USA
- Coordinates: 44.52667°N 110.83768°W
- Elevation: 7,250 feet (2,210 m)
- Type: Hot Spring
- Temperature: 142 to 160 °F (61 to 71 °C)

Turquoise Pool is a hot spring in the Midway Geyser Basin of Yellowstone National Park, Wyoming. Turquoise Pool has a temperature between 142 and 160 °F (61 and 71 °C) and was named by members of the Hayden Expedition of 1878.

== See also ==
- Geothermal areas of Yellowstone
- Hayden Geological Survey of 1871
- List of Yellowstone geothermal features
- Yellowstone National Park
