= Big Cone =

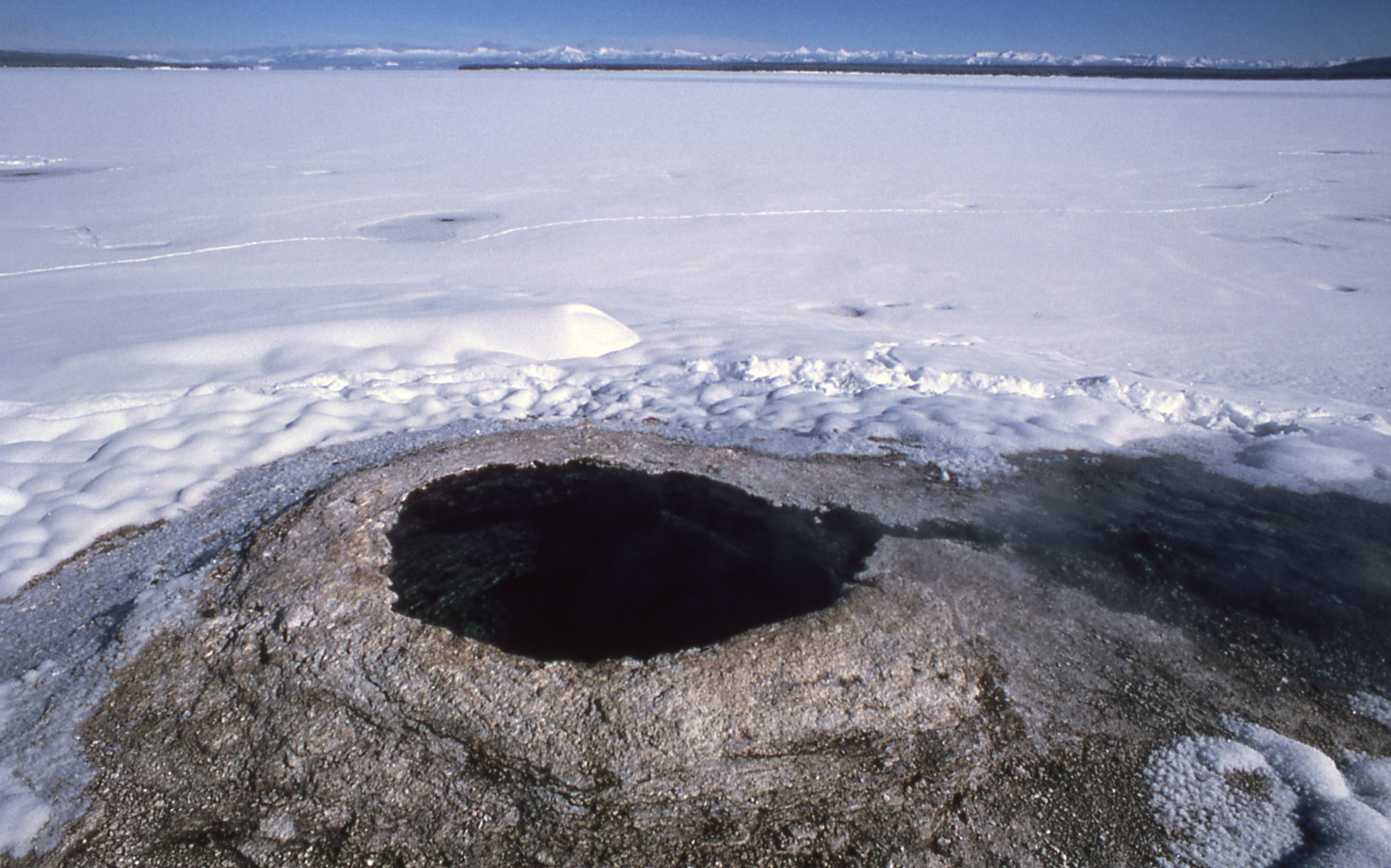
- Big Cone Geyser

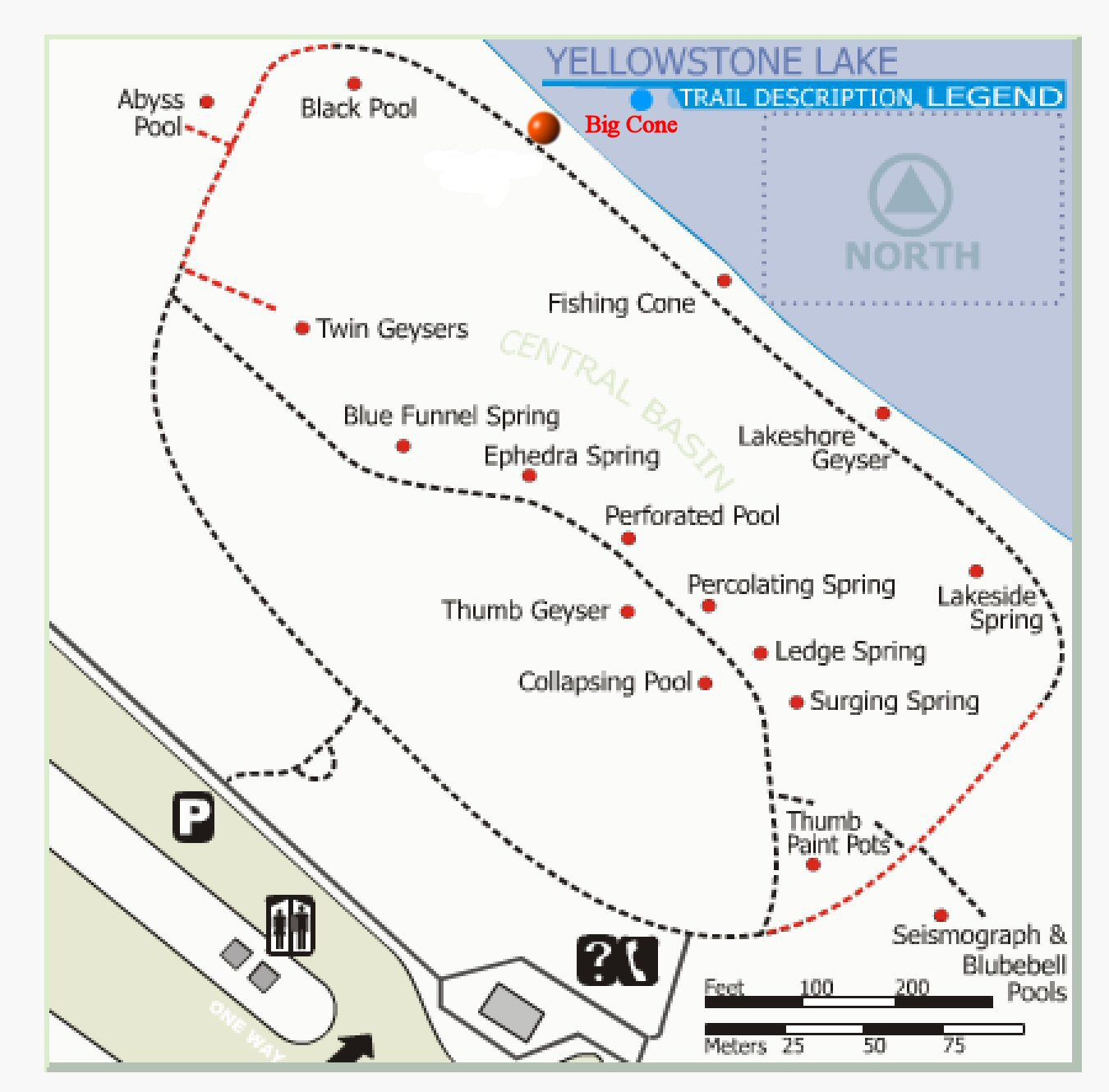
- West Thumb Geyser Basin
- Location: West Thumb Geyser Basin, Yellowstone National Park, Teton County, Wyoming
- Coordinates: 44°25′03″N 110°34′14″W
- Elevation: 7,864 feet (2,397 m)
- Type: Cone-type Geyser
- Eruption height: <1 foot
- Frequency: Rare
- Discharge: Seeping

Big Cone is a geyser in the West Thumb Geyser Basin of Yellowstone National Park in the United States.

Big Cone is a 7 metres (23 ft) wide sinter cone that rises from Yellowstone Lake about 7 metres (23 ft) from the shoreline. The vent of the cone is 80 centimetres (31 in) wide. At times of increased water level in the lake, the cone may be submerged completely. Big Cone is known to undergo rare eruptions 1 foot high or less.
