= Doublet Pool =

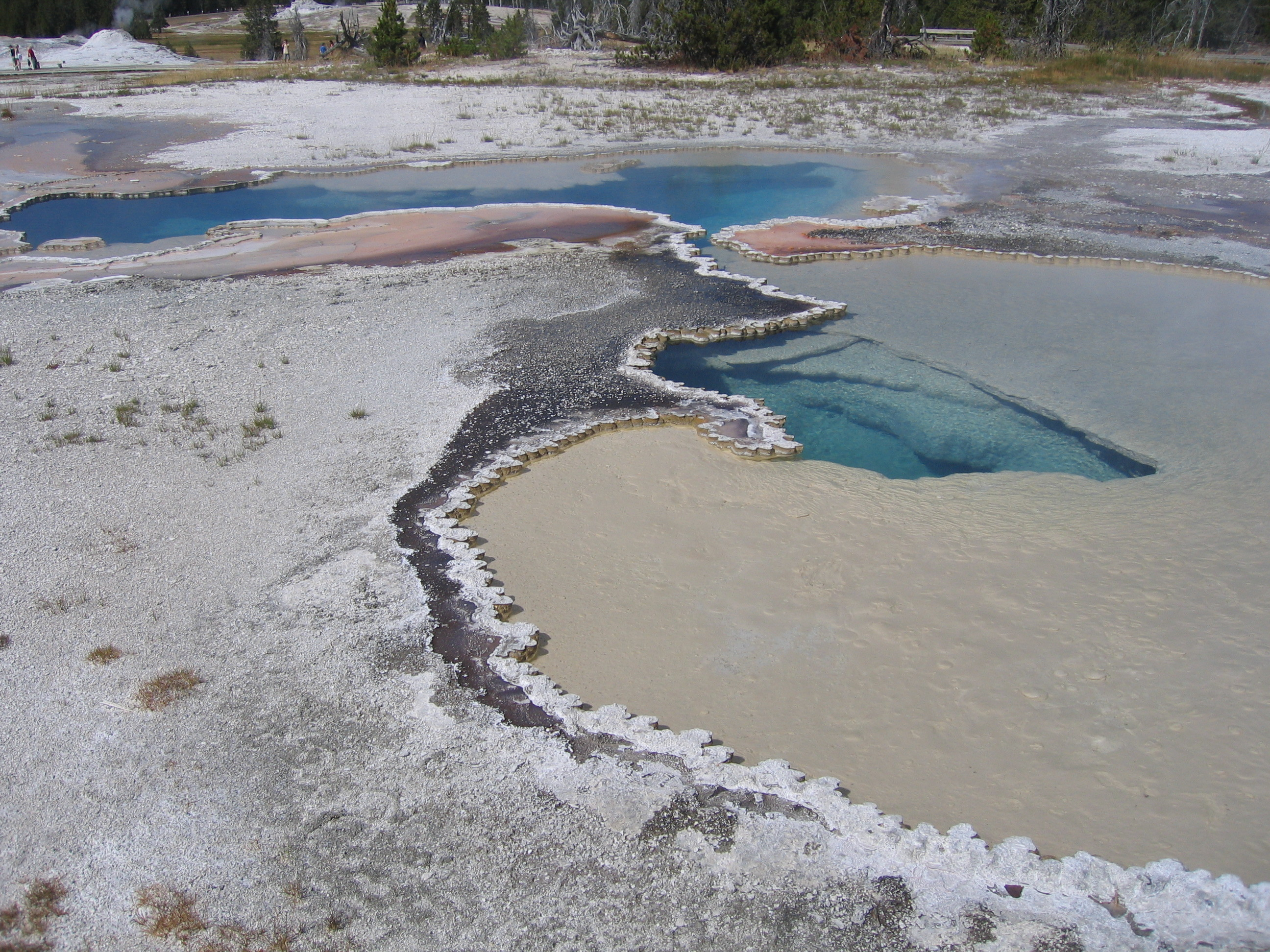
- Doublet Pool
- Interactive map of Doublet Pool
- Location: Yellowstone National Park, Teton County, Wyoming, USA
- Coordinates: 44°27′52″N 110°49′47″W
- Elevation: 7,356 feet (2,242 m)
- Type: Hot spring
- Temperature: 194.4 °F (90.2 °C)
- Depth: 8 feet (2.4 m)

Doublet Pool is a hot spring in the Upper Geyser Basin of Yellowstone National Park, Wyoming.

Doublet Pool is 8 feet (2.4 m) deep and its temperature is approximately 194.4 °F (90.2 °C). Its scalloped edge is made of geyserite. Eruptions can occur in Doublet Pool, but only last up to 8 minutes. The pool on the right pulses over the vents about every two hours. Occasionally there will be vibrations, surface wave motion, and thumping; these effects are caused by collapsing gas and steam bubbles deep underground.

== See also ==
- List of Yellowstone geothermal features
- Yellowstone National Park
- Geothermal areas of Yellowstone
