= Economic Geyser =

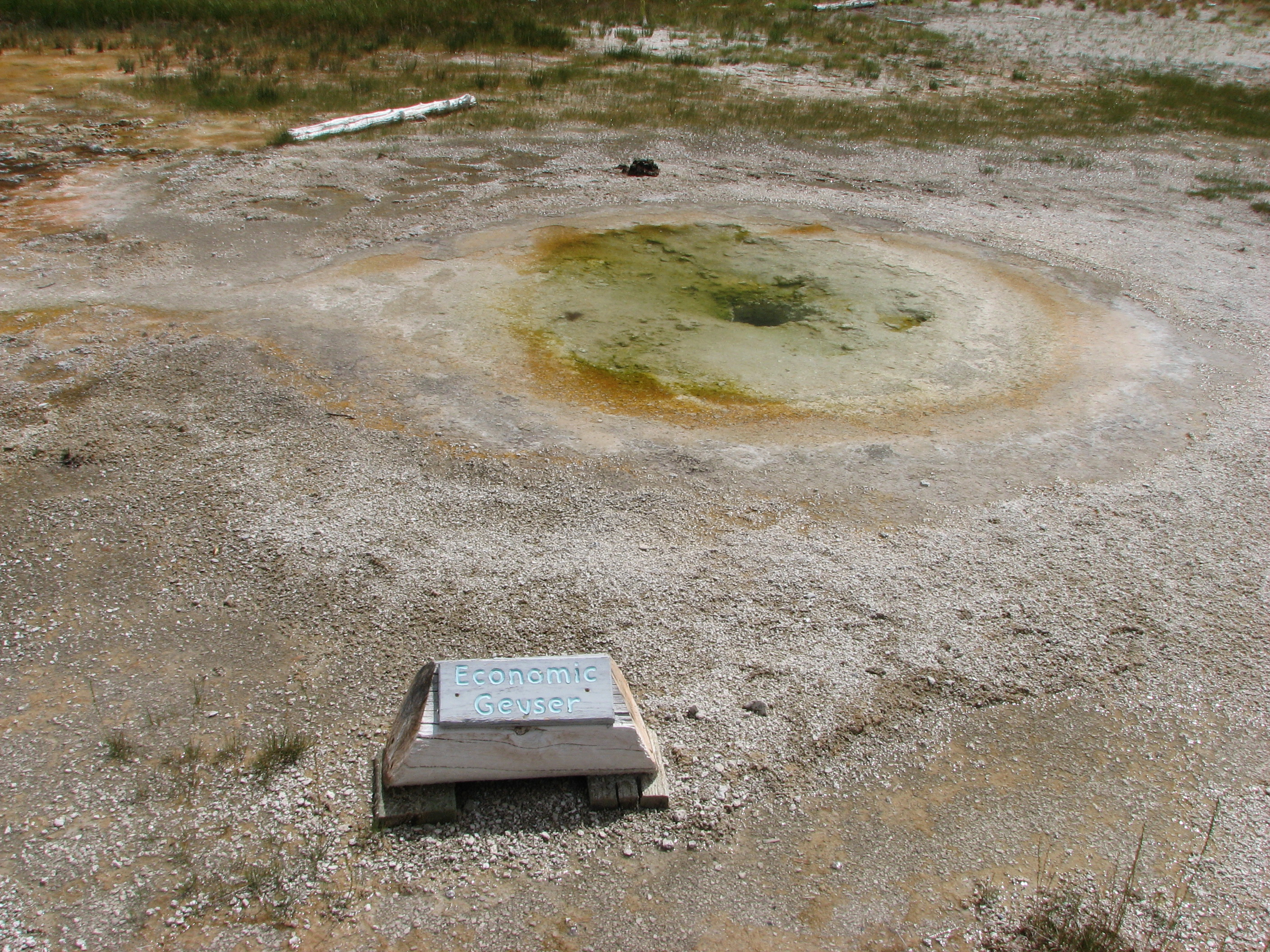
- Economic Geyser's Pool
- Interactive map of Economic Geyser
- Name origin: Named by Frank Jay Haynes between 1883 and 1916
- Location: Upper Geyser Basin, Yellowstone National Park, Teton County, Wyoming
- Coordinates: 44°28′4″N 110°50′16.4″W
- Type: Fountain geyser
- Eruption height: 10–25 feet (3.0–7.6 m)
- Frequency: Last erupted in 1996
- Duration: Seconds
- Discharge: small

Economic Geyser is a geyser in the Upper Geyser Basin of Yellowstone National Park in the United States.

Economic Geyser is a small, usually inactive geyser located between the Giant Geyser group and the Grand Geyser group. Economic Geyser was once a popular, frequently-erupting geyser until it became essentially dormant in the 1920s.

Economic Geyser is believed to be named for its behavior during its active days. It is reported that most of the water ejected drained back into the vent after the eruption, thus making the geyser appear to conserve its water. It was most likely named by Frank Jay Haynes, the park photographer from 1883 to 1916.

The temperature of the water in geyser pools and other geothermal features can be judged by the color of the bacteria living in the water. Changes in the size and color of bacteria mats at Economic Geyser imply that the geyser is heating up. Photographs of the geyser vent taken in the 1990s show a quiet pool very dark with algae. Photographs of the vent taken in 2006 show a pool of clear water with traces of the bacterial colors associated with higher temperatures.
