= Artesia Geyser =

Geyser in Yellowstone National Park, US

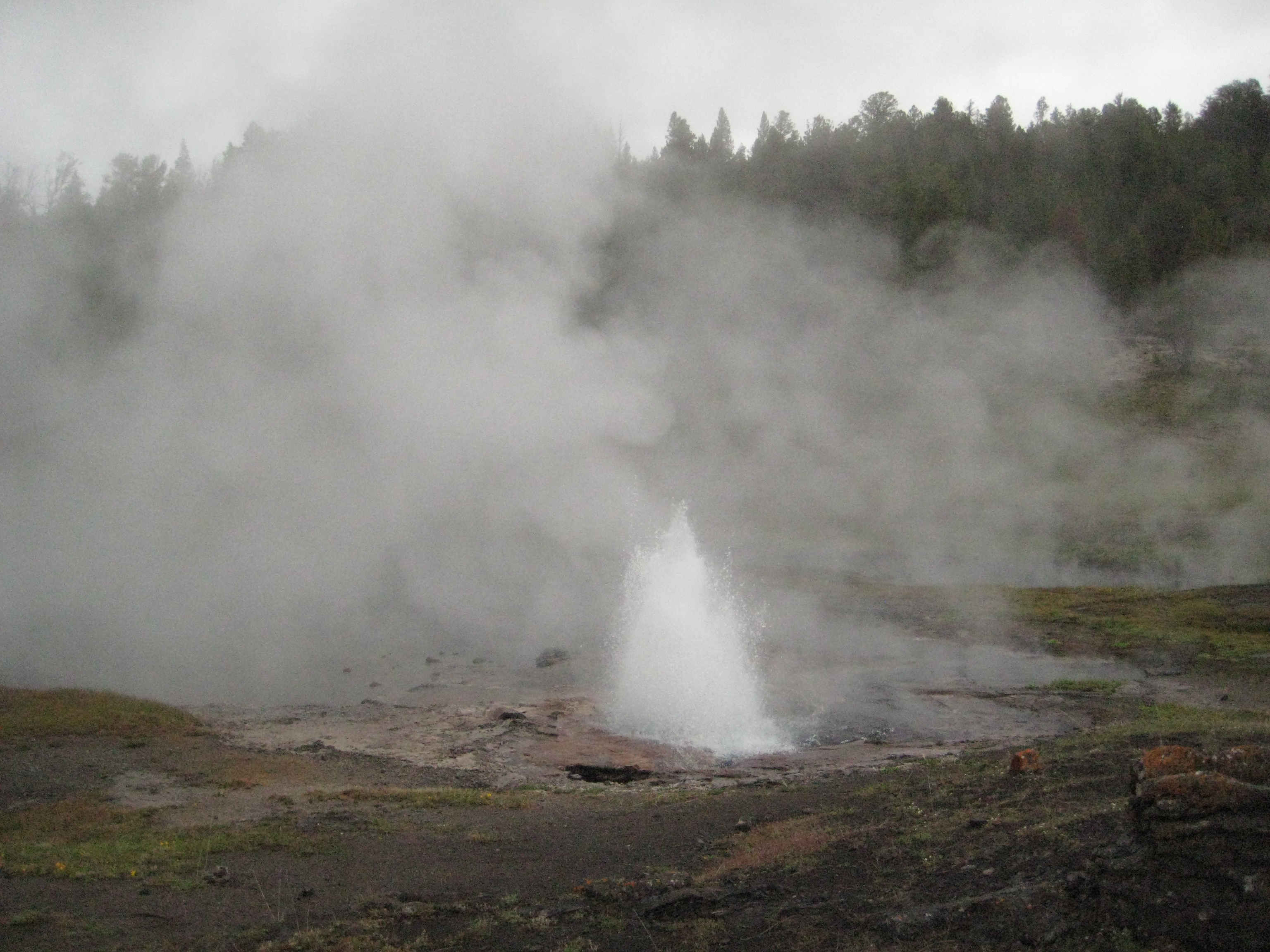
- Interactive map of Artesia Geyser
- Location: Lower Geyser Basin, Yellowstone National Park, Teton County, Wyoming
- Coordinates: 44°32′39″N 110°47′03″W
- Type: Geyser
- Eruption height: 4 to 5 meters
- Duration: Perpetual
- Temperature: 190 °F (88 °C)

Artesia Geyser is a geyser in the Lower Geyser Basin of Yellowstone National Park in the United States. Artesia Geyser is located on the edge of Firehole Lake and is part of the Black Warrior Group which includes Young Hopeful Geyser, Grey Bulger Geyser, and Steady Geyser.

== Geology ==
Artesia is a perpetual geyser that never stops ejecting water from at least one of its two vents, usually no more than 5 ft (1.5 m). One vent is angled toward the boardwalk that passes the geyser and the other is angled toward Firehole Lake.

During a period in 1999, one of the vents jetted to a distance of 12 ft (3.7 m) while the other emitted only steam.

In 2012, Artesia was having prominent, vertical eruptions about once a minute, with minimal activity between. From 2014 to 2017, it was a low perpetual spouter only. In summer 2018, Artesia resumed having prominent eruptions once a minute, with column heights reaching four to five meters high.
