= Beauty Pool =

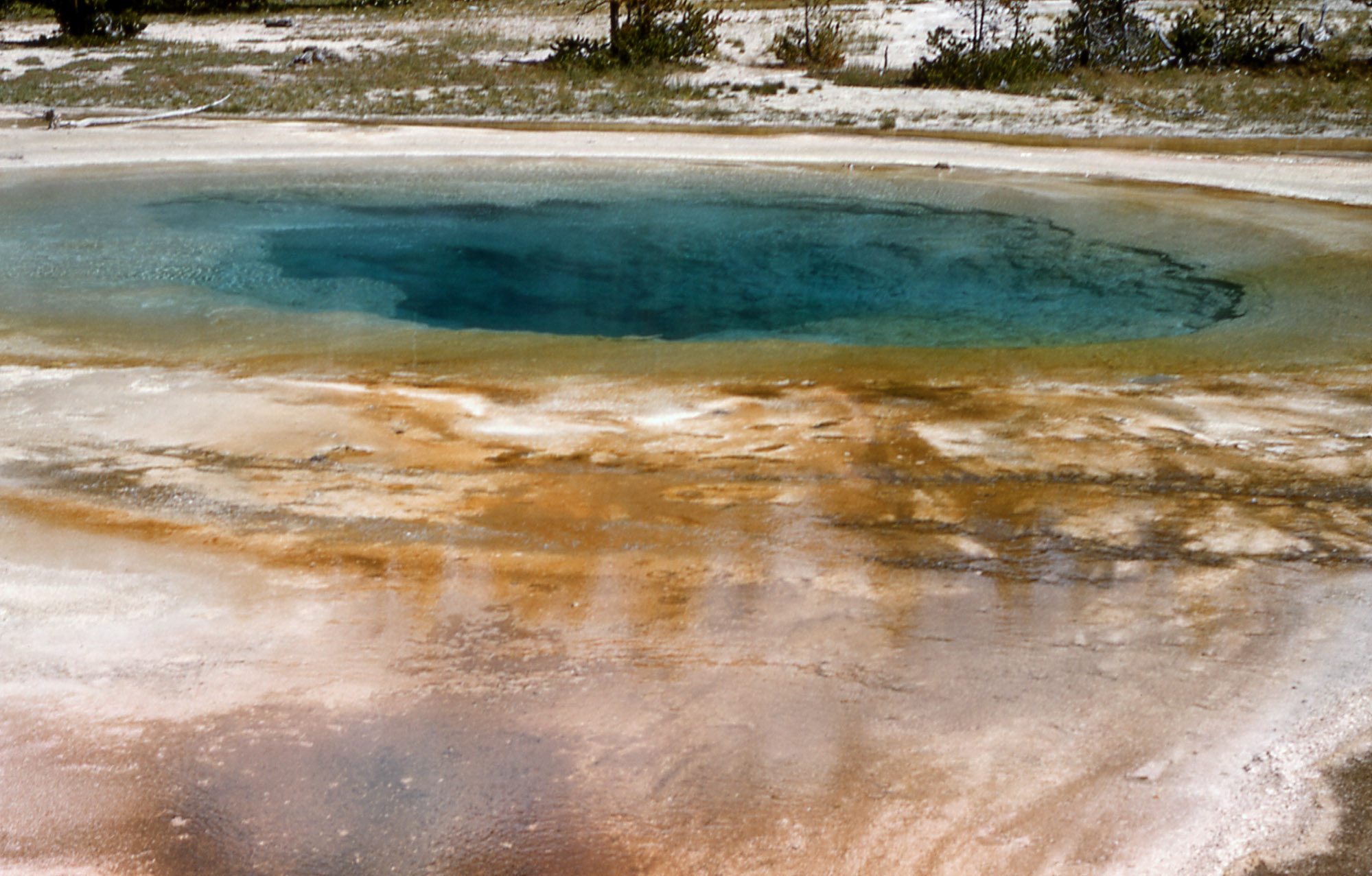
- Beauty Pool
- Interactive map of Beauty Pool
- Location: Upper Geyser Basin, Yellowstone National Park, Teton County, Wyoming
- Coordinates: 44°28′06″N 110°50′20″W
- Elevation: 7,336 feet (2,236 m)
- Type: Hot Spring
- Temperature: 164–175 °F (73–79 °C)
- Depth: 25 feet (7.6 m)

Beauty Pool is a hot spring in the Upper Geyser Basin of Yellowstone National Park in the United States.

It is connected to the nearby Chromatic Spring. When the water level in one of the two pools rises and overflows, the water level in the other decreases. These fluctuations in water level take place over periods ranging from a few weeks to several years. During this energy shift, the temperatures can change about 10 °F. Its temperature ranges from 164 to 175 °F (73 to 79 °C)
