= Young Hopeful and Grey Bulger Geysers =

Geysers in Yellowstone National Park

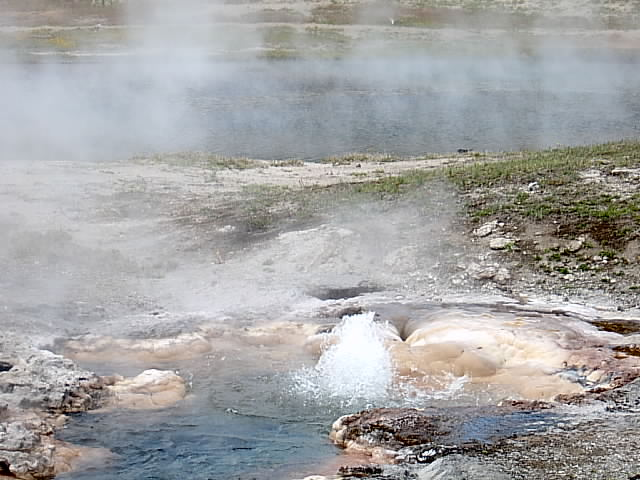
- Grey Bulger's main vent
- Interactive map of Young Hopeful and Grey Bulger Geysers
- Location: Lower Geyser Basin, Yellowstone National Park, Teton County, Wyoming
- Coordinates: 44°33′00″N 110°49′03″W
- Type: Perpetual spouter geyser
- Eruption height: 2–6 ft (0.61–1.83 m)
- Temperature: 89 °C (192 °F)

Young Hopeful Geyser and Grey Bulger Geyser are two separate geysers that share the same pool in the Lower Geyser Basin of Yellowstone National Park in the United States. Both geysers are part of the Black Warrior Group which includes Artesia Geyser and Steady Geyser.

Grey Bulger Geyser is a single geyser that erupts out of multiple vents, which depending on the seasonal water table, can erupt either continuously or intermittently. The two largest vents often reach about 2 feet (0.61 m) but sometimes surge to 6 feet (1.8 m). All of Grey Bulger's vents are located in or around the "top" of the J-shaped pool. At least 10 active or potentially active vents are present. Eight simultaneously erupting vents were reported in August 2018.

Young Hopeful Geyser is another single geyser that erupts from multiple vents. Young Hopeful is currently dormant. The vents are located in and around the end of the J-shaped pool. The main vent of Young Hopeful is a tiny pool next to the "bottom" of the J-shaped pool.
