= Whistler Geyser =

- Interactive map of Whistler Geyser
- Location: Joseph's Coat Springs Thermal Area, Yellowstone National Park
- Coordinates: 44°44′17″N 110°19′37″W
- Elevation: 8,107 feet (2,471 m)

Whistler Geyser is a series of small steaming holes in the Joseph's Coat Springs Thermal Area on the western edge of the Mirror Plateau at the head of Broad Creek in Yellowstone National Park. The Joseph's Coat Springs Thermal Area is an isolated thermal feature not accessed by any marked trail. The Whistler Geyser was discovered by Capt W. A. Jones in 1873 during the Hayden Geological Survey of 1873. In 1884, Arnold Hague and Walter Weed visited the area and documented the thermal features during the Hague Geological Survey. Hague named the vent Whistler because of the noise it made.
