= Chromatic Spring =

Hot spring in Yellowstone National Park, US

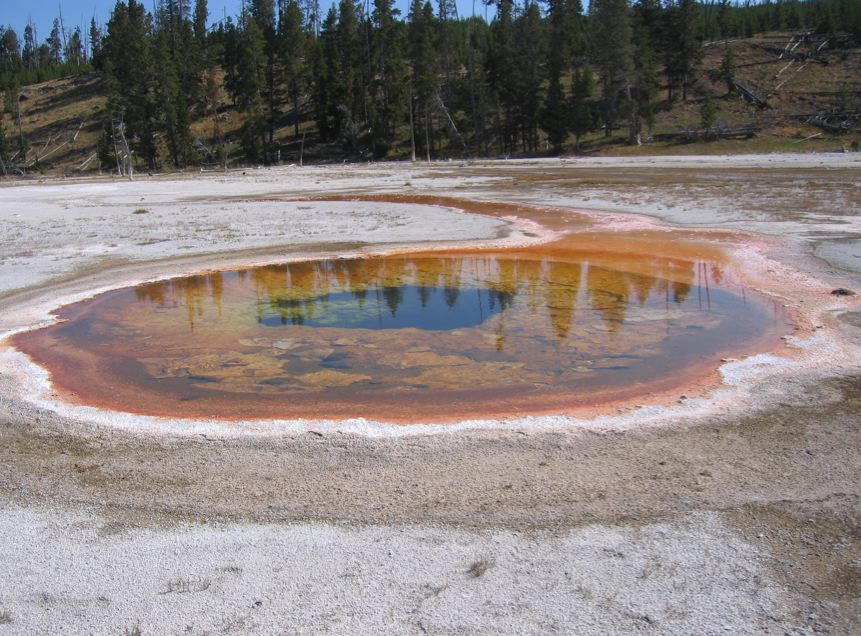
- Chromatic Spring
- Interactive map of Chromatic Spring
- Location: Upper Geyser Basin, Yellowstone National Park, Teton County, Wyoming
- Coordinates: 44°28′07″N 110°50′21″W
- Elevation: 7,331 feet (2,234 m)
- Type: Hot Spring
- Temperature: 164 to 175 °F (73 to 79 °C)

Chromatic Spring is a hot spring in the Upper Geyser Basin of Yellowstone National Park in the United States.

It is connected to the nearby Beauty Pool. When the water level in one of the two pools rises and overflows, the water level in the other decreases. These fluctuations in water level take place over periods ranging from a few weeks to several years. During this energy shift, the temperatures can change about 10 °F (5.6 °C). Its temperature ranges from 164 to 175 °F (73 to 79 °C).
