= Baby Daisy Geyser =

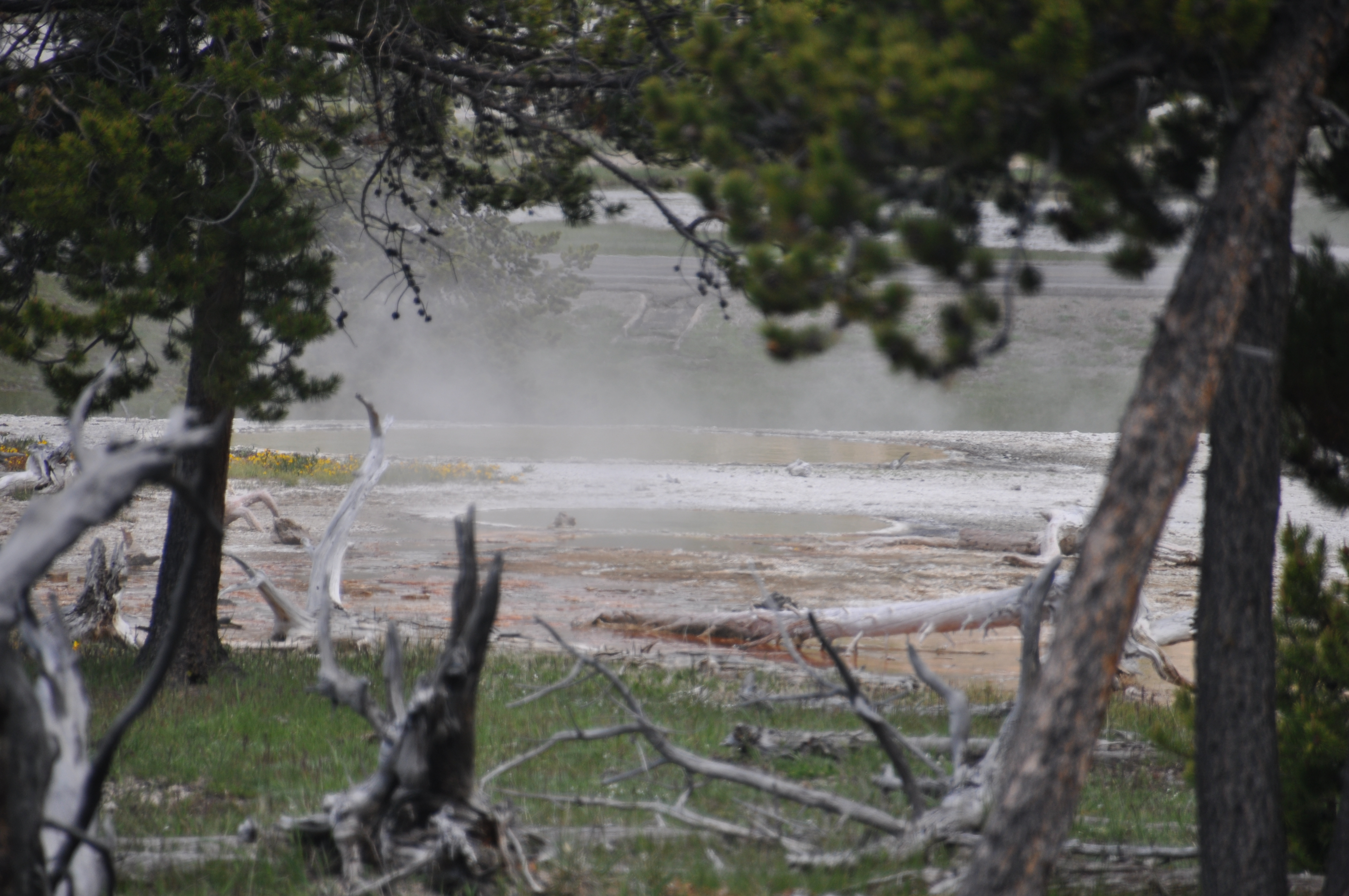
- Baby Daisy Geyser is the smaller pool in front, while the larger pool in back is Baby Splendid Geyser.
- Interactive map of Baby Daisy Geyser
- Location: Upper Geyser Basin, Yellowstone National Park, Teton County, Wyoming
- Coordinates: 44°28′54″N 110°51′02″W
- Elevation: 2,220 metres (7,280 ft)
- Type: Cone geyser
- Eruption height: 20 to 25 feet (6.1 to 7.6 m)
- Frequency: 33 to 39 minutes
- Duration: 2 to 3 minutes
- Temperature: 60 °C (140 °F)

Baby Daisy Geyser is a geyser in the Upper Geyser Basin of Yellowstone National Park in the United States. It is part of the Old Road group of geysers.

Baby Daisy goes through periods of activity with years of inactivity in between. The most recent active period occurred from 2003 to 2004. During this time, it erupted for a duration of two and three minutes, with intervals of 33 to 39 minutes between eruptions. The height of its eruptions are 20 to 25 feet (6.1 to 7.6 m).

Baby Daisy received its name from the fact that its eruptions are nearly identical to the Daisy Geyser although on a smaller scale. Eruptions fountain water at about 30 degrees from vertical, the same angle as Daisy Geyser.
