= Big Alcove Spring =

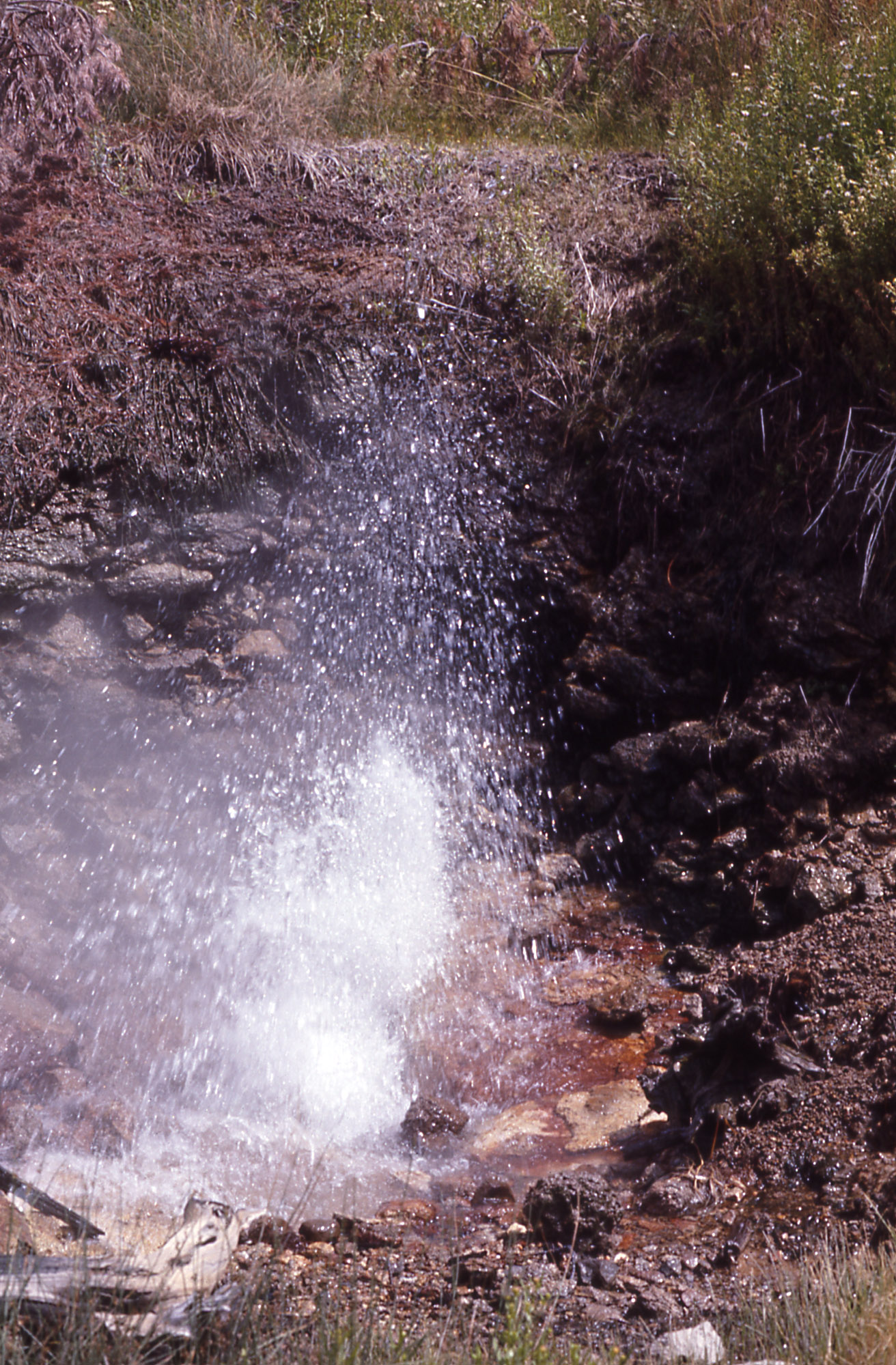
- Big Alcove Spring
- Interactive map of Big Alcove Spring
- Location: Norris Geyser Basin, Yellowstone National Park, Park County, Wyoming
- Coordinates: 44°43′08″N 110°42′25″W
- Elevation: 7,524 feet (2,293 m)
- Type: Hot Spring
- Temperature: 92.4 °C (198.3 °F)

Big Alcove Spring is a hot spring in Norris Geyser Basin, Yellowstone National Park in the United States. In 1996 the water temperature was 92.4 °C (198.3 °F).
