= Solitary Geyser =

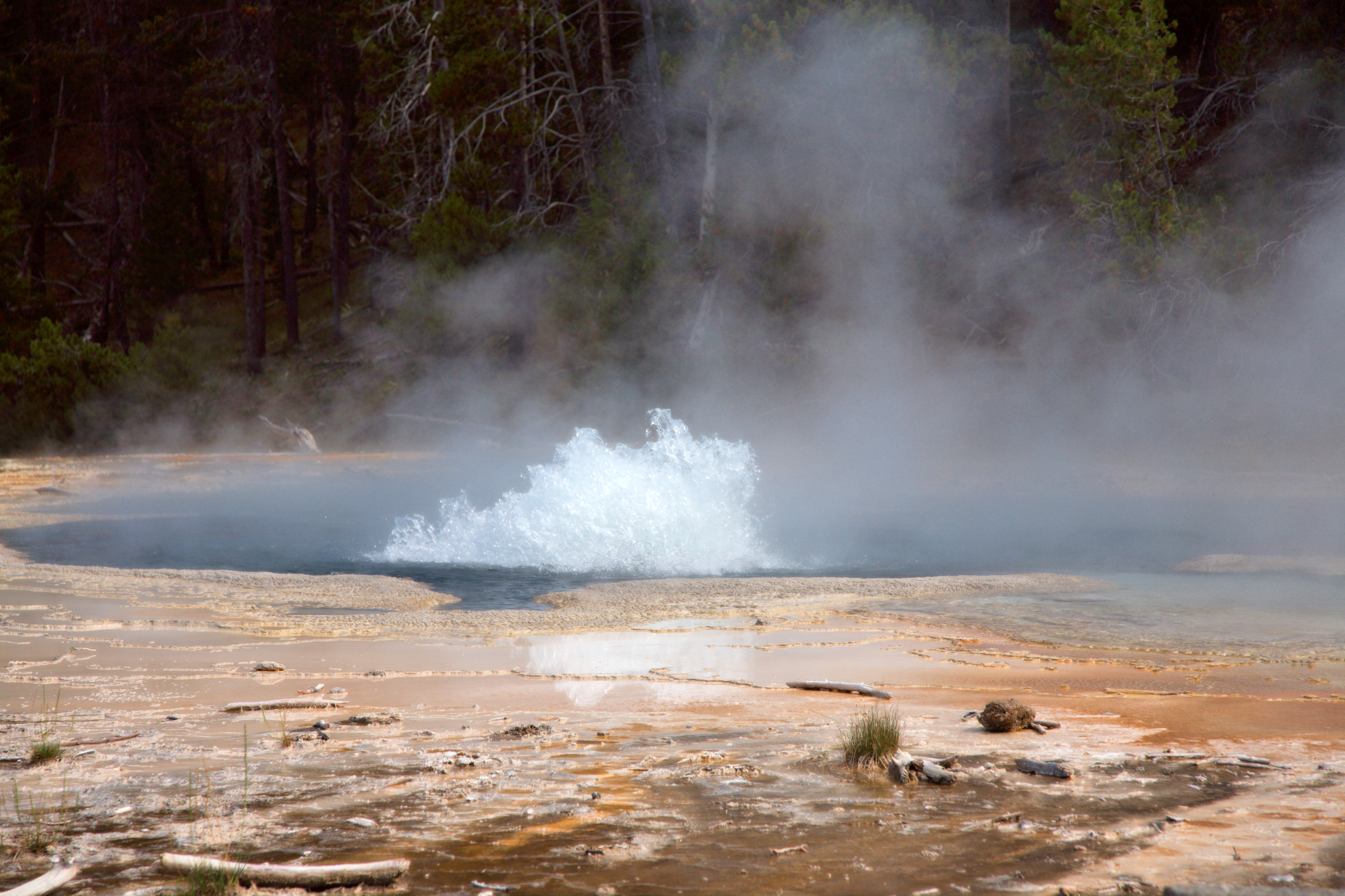
- Interactive map of Solitary Geyser
- Location: Upper Geyser Basin, Yellowstone National Park, Teton County, Wyoming
- Coordinates: 44°28′08″N 110°49′42″W
- Elevation: 7,543 feet (2,299 m)
- Type: Fountain geyser
- Eruption height: 6 ft (1.8 m)
- Frequency: 4-8 minutes
- Duration: 1 minute

Solitary Geyser is a fountain-type geyser in Yellowstone National Park, located above the Upper Geyser Basin. Eruptions last about a minute and are four to eight minutes apart; most eruptions are less than 6 feet (1.8 m) in height. It is very distinctive with clear blue water underneath and a base that is tinted orange. Solitary Geyser is accessible via the Observation Point loop trail behind Old Faithful.

Originally this geyser was a hot spring known as Solitary Spring, which did not erupt. In 1914, water was diverted to heat a swimming pool, resulting in the water level being lowered, allowing boiling to occur at depth. This resulted in the geyser erupting regularly. In 1951, the pool was removed, the diversion of water was stopped, and the water has returned to its previous level, but eruptions continue.
