= Chinese Spring (Wyoming) =

Hot spring in Teton County, Wyoming, United States

Coordinates: 44°27′43.19″N 110°49′44.41″W

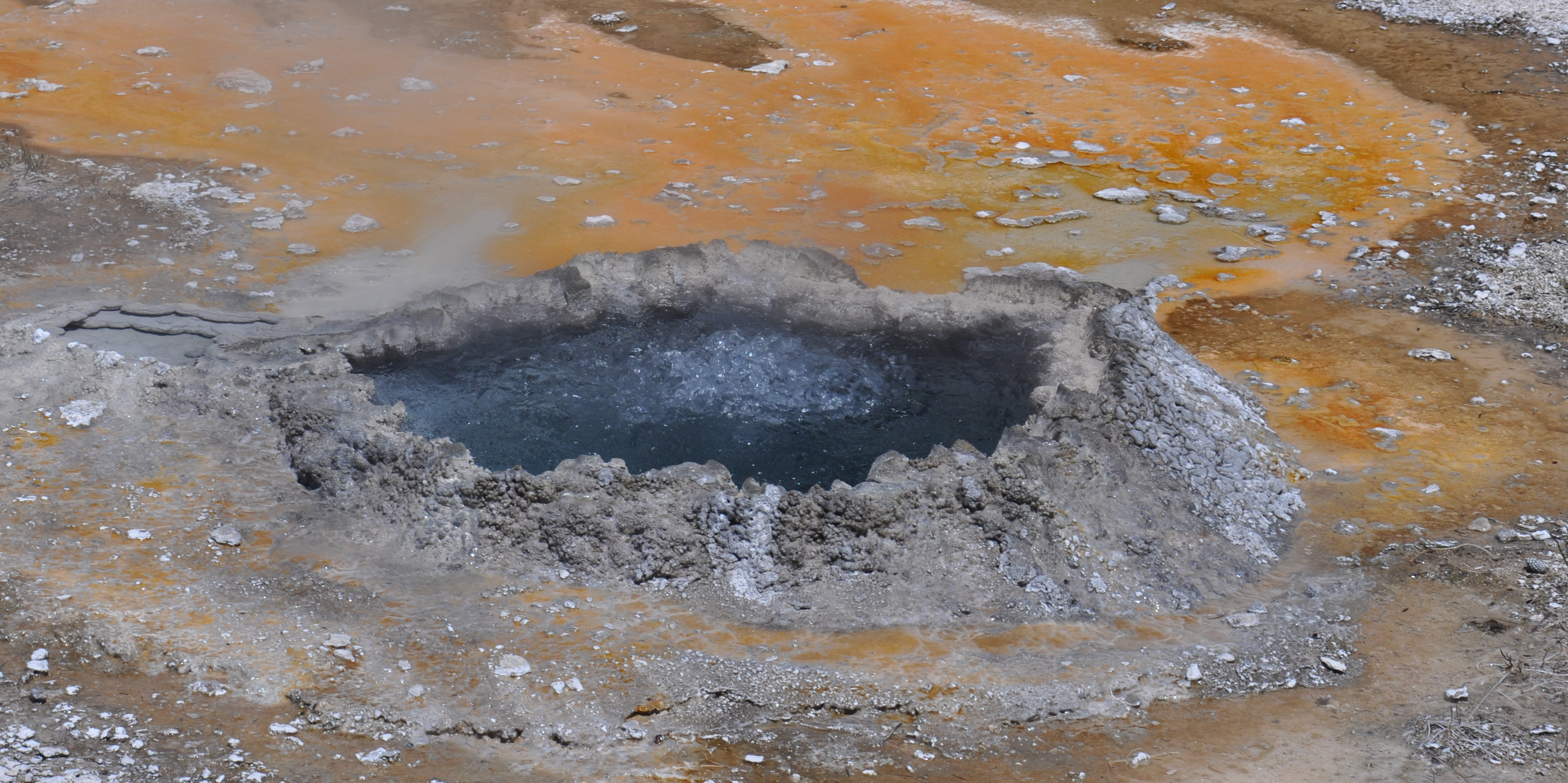

Chinese Spring (formerly called Chinaman Spring) is a hot spring in the Upper Geyser Basin in Yellowstone National Park, Teton County, Wyoming, in the United States. The spring was named Chinaman Spring until 1990 when it was changed to the current less offensive name.

Chinese Spring was named for a Chinese immigrant who often washed laundry in the spring in the 1850s. Reportedly it may have actually been two Japanese men who ran a laundry service at the spring, though it is unclear when or whether they were really the reason for the spring's (possibly incorrect) name. It is located in the Old Faithful group, near Blue Star Spring on the south side of the Firehole River. In 1885, Chief Justice Morrison R. Waite wrote in a letter to geologist Arnold Hague that he had witnessed an eruption of the spring. Modern eruptions are rare but can reportedly be as high as 20 feet lasting for two minutes.
