= Azure Spring =

Hot spring located in Yellowstone National Park

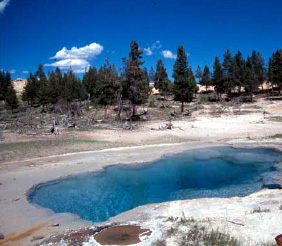
- Azure Spring
- Interactive map of Azure Spring
- Location: Lower Geyser Basin, Yellowstone National Park, Teton County, Wyoming
- Coordinates: 44°33′39″N 110°49′59″W
- Elevation: 2,193 metres (7,195 ft)
- Type: Hot spring pool
- Temperature: 79 °C (174 °F)

Azure Spring is a hot spring in the Lower Geyser Basin of Yellowstone National Park in the United States. The water temperature in the spring is 79 °C (174 °F). Azure spring is also close to Pocket basin geyser.
