= List of geysers =

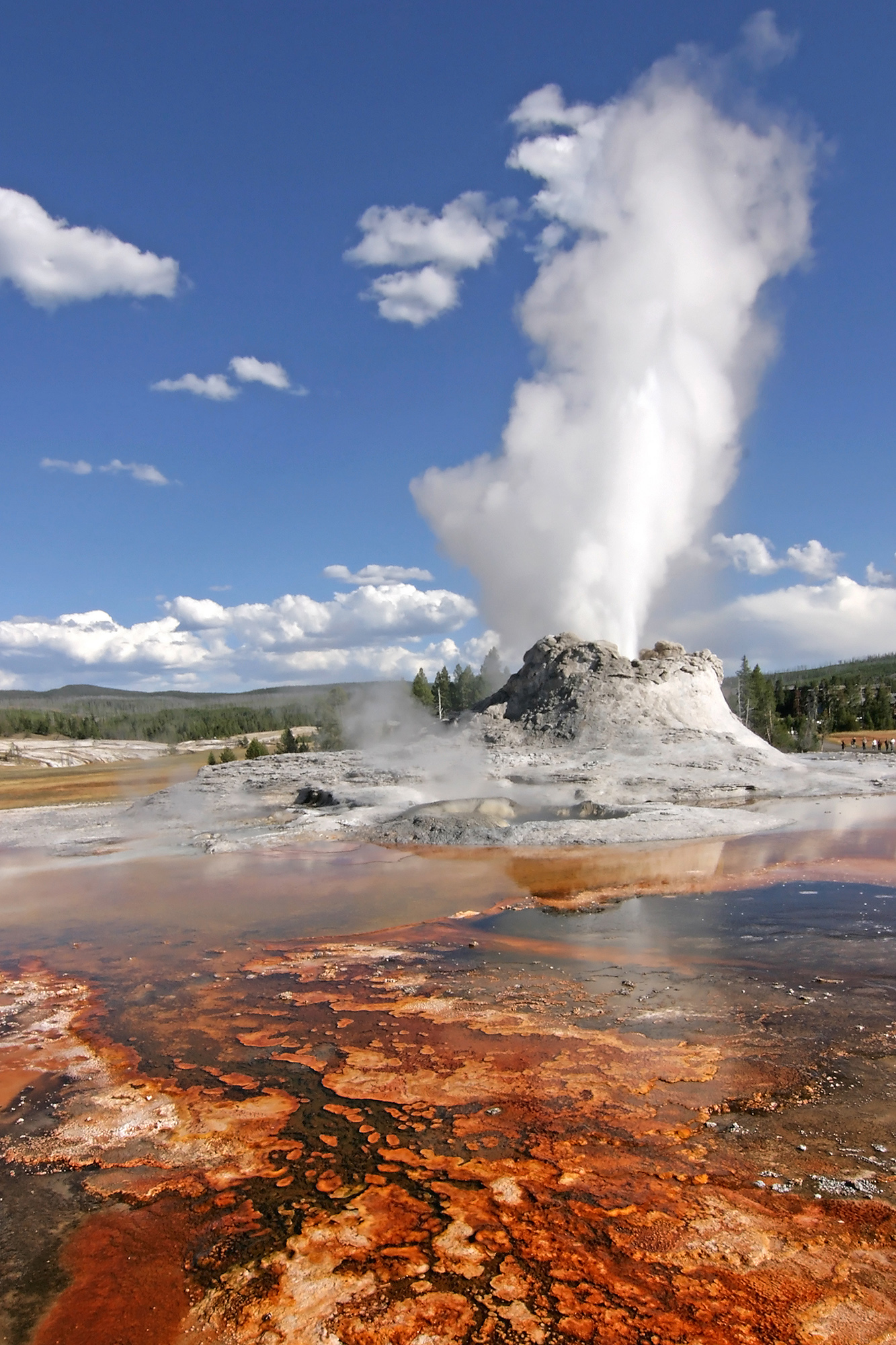
Castle Geyser, Yellowstone

This is a list of notable geysers, a type of erupting hot spring.

== Argentina ==
- Coronel Mollinedo Geyser (Salta)
- Varvarco (Neuquén)

== Brazil ==
- Floriano de Lemos Geyser (Minas Gerais)

== Bulgaria ==
- Sapareva Geyser (Sapareva Banya)

== Chile ==
- El Tatio, Northern Chile

== Iceland ==
- Geysir
- Strokkur
- Gámur

== Mexico ==
- Maguarichi (Chihuahua)

== New Zealand ==
- Diamond Geyser (Orakei Korako)
- Kereru Geyser (Whakarewarewa)
- Lady Knox Geyser (Waiotapu)
- Minguini Geyser (Orakei Korako)
- Pōhutu Geyser (Whakarewarewa)
- Prince of Wales Feathers Geyser (Whakarewarewa)
- Waimangu Geyser (Rotorua)

== Russia ==
- Bolshoi (Greater) Geyser
- Maly (Lesser) Geyser
- Sakharny (Sugar) Geyser
- Zhemchuzhny (Pearl) Geyser
- Velikan (Giant) Geyser

== Serbia ==
- Sijarinska Geyser (Sijarinska Banja)

== United States ==
=== Wyoming ===
- Artemisia Geyser
- Beehive Geyser
- Castle Geyser
- Daisy Geyser
- Excelsior Geyser
- Fan & Mortar Geysers
- Fountain Geyser
- Giant Geyser
- Giantess Geyser
- Grand Geyser
- Great Fountain Geyser
- Ledge Geyser
- Monarch Geyser
- Morning Geyser
- Old Faithful Geyser
- Riverside Geyser
- Splendid Geyser
- Steamboat Geyser
- White Dome Geyser

=== Nevada ===
- Beowawe
- Fly Geyser (Black Rock Desert)
- Steamboat Springs

=== California ===
- Old Faithful Geyser, Calistoga

== Cold water ==
The following are carbon dioxide-generated cold water geysers:

- Andernach Geyser (aka Namedyer Sprudel), (Eifel, Germany)
- Crystal Geyser (near Green River, Utah, United States)
- Herľany geyser (World Heritage Site) (Herľany, Slovakia)
- Mokena Geyser (Te Aroha, New Zealand)
- Saratoga springs
- Soda Springs Geyser, (Idaho, United States)
- Wallender Born (aka Brubbel), (Eifel, Germany)
- Geyser of Vuchkove (Vuchkove, Ukraine)
- Gêiser Floriano de Lemos, (Caxambu, Brazil)
