= Jet Geyser =

Geyser in the Lower Geyser Basin of Yellowstone National Park

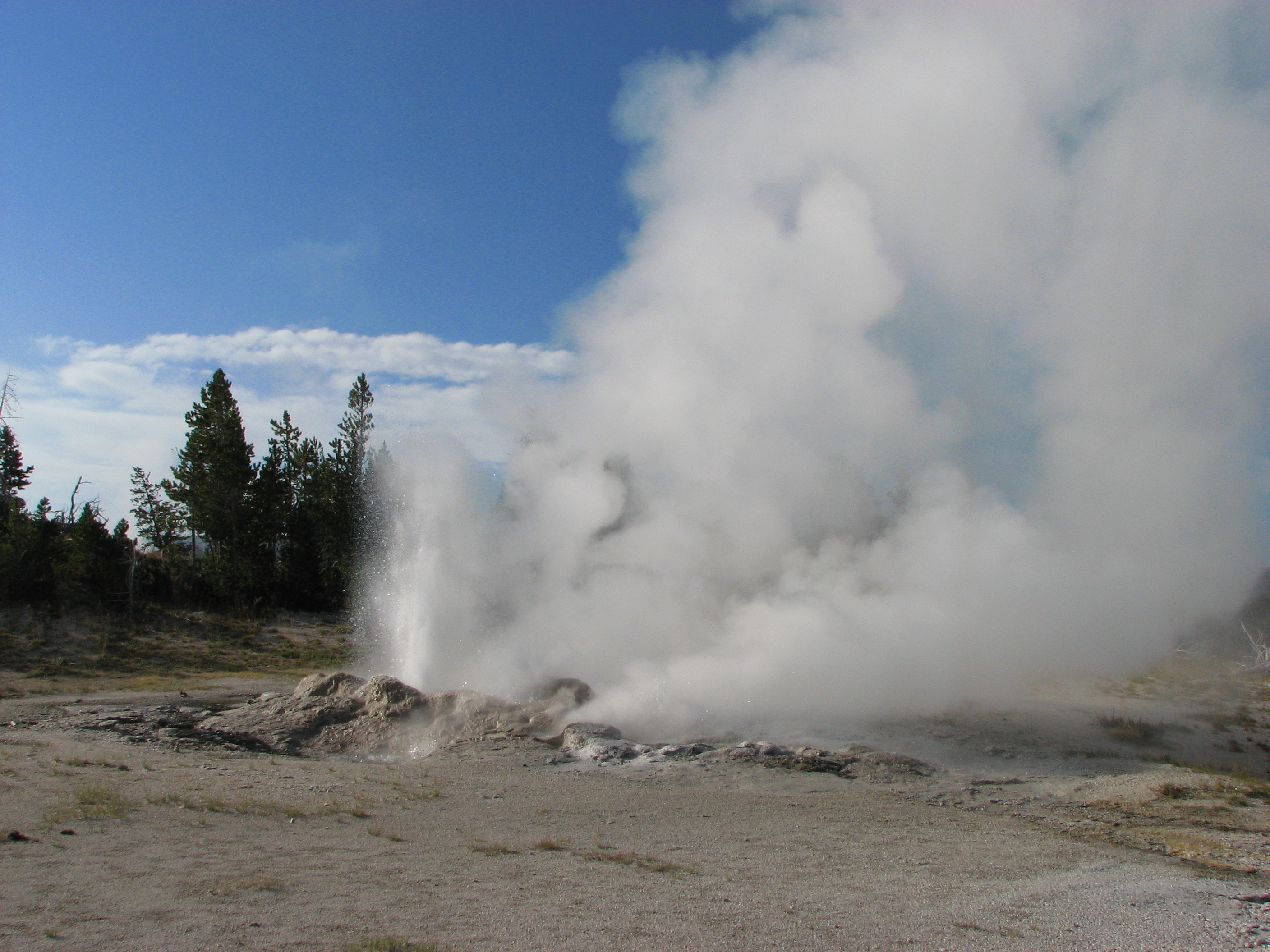
- Jet Geyser

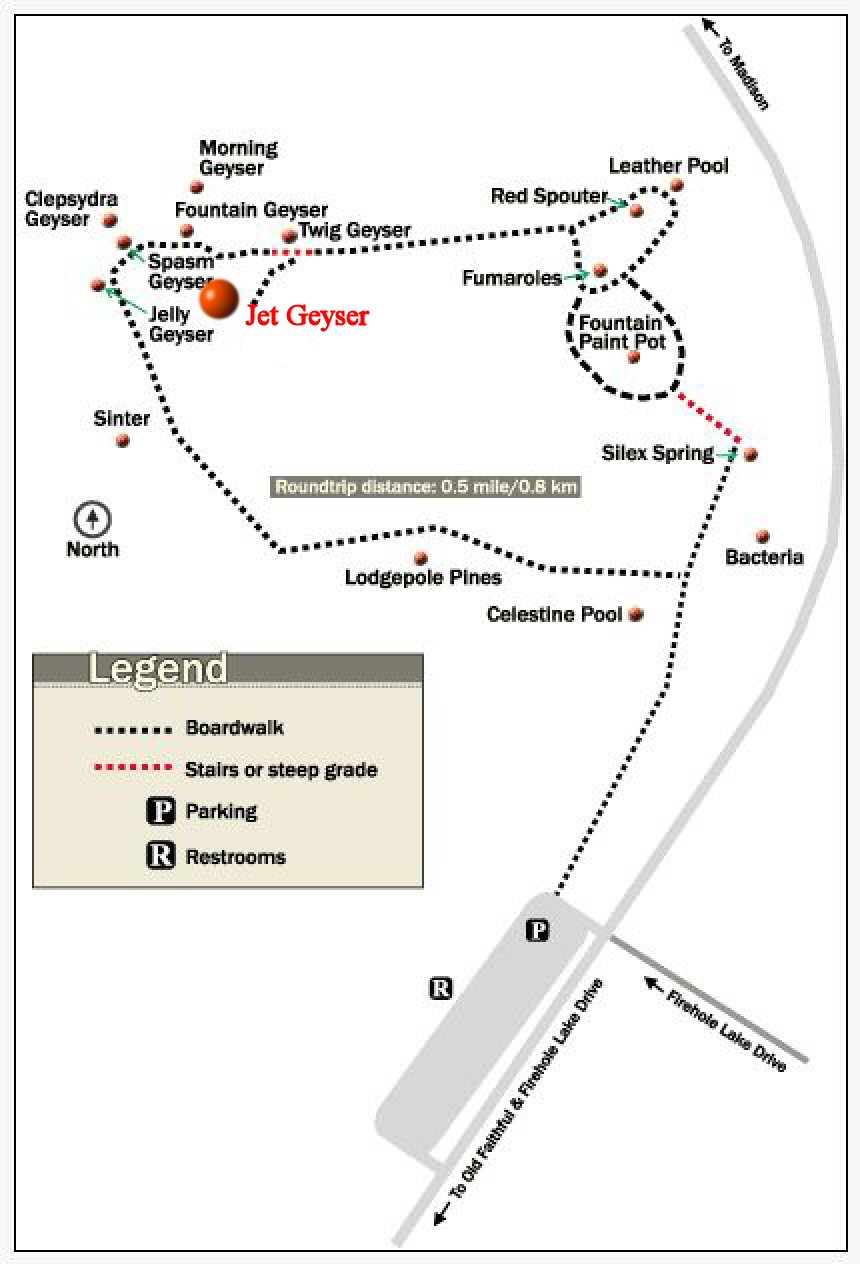
- Jet Geyser location
- Location: Fountain Paint Pots, Lower Geyser Basin, Yellowstone National Park, Teton County, Wyoming
- Coordinates: 44.5509084°N 110.8082818°W
- Elevation: 8,087 feet (2,465 m)
- Type: Cone geyser
- Eruption height: 20 feet (6.1 m)
- Frequency: every 30 minutes
- Duration: 1 minute
- Temperature: 34.4 °C (93.9 °F)

Jet Geyser is a geyser in the Lower Geyser Basin of Yellowstone National Park in the United States. Jet Geyser is in the Fountain Group that includes Fountain Geyser, Morning Geyser, Red Spouter and Silex Spring.

Jet Geyser is a very accessible and intimate geyser, being close to a park road and alongside a boardwalk.

Jet usually erupts in long-duration series. During series, eruptions are relatively frequent and less than one minute in duration. Jet Geyser's behavior is influenced by nearby (and much bigger) Fountain Geyser. Jet eruptions usually occur every 7 to 30 minutes, with the frequency increasing as a Fountain Geyser eruption nears. Jet erupts every 1 to 4 minutes during most Fountain Geyser eruptions. After Fountain has quit, Jet usually quits. Approximately mid-way through a Fountain Geyser interval, Jet often starts a new eruption series.

Jet is a cone-type geyser with at least five vents that erupt in different directions (vertical, angled, and subhorizontal). The vents produce varying quantities of water and steam for about 0.25 to 1 minute. The central vent will usually erupt to about 20 feet (6.1 m).
