= Comet Geyser =

Geyser in Yellowstone National Park

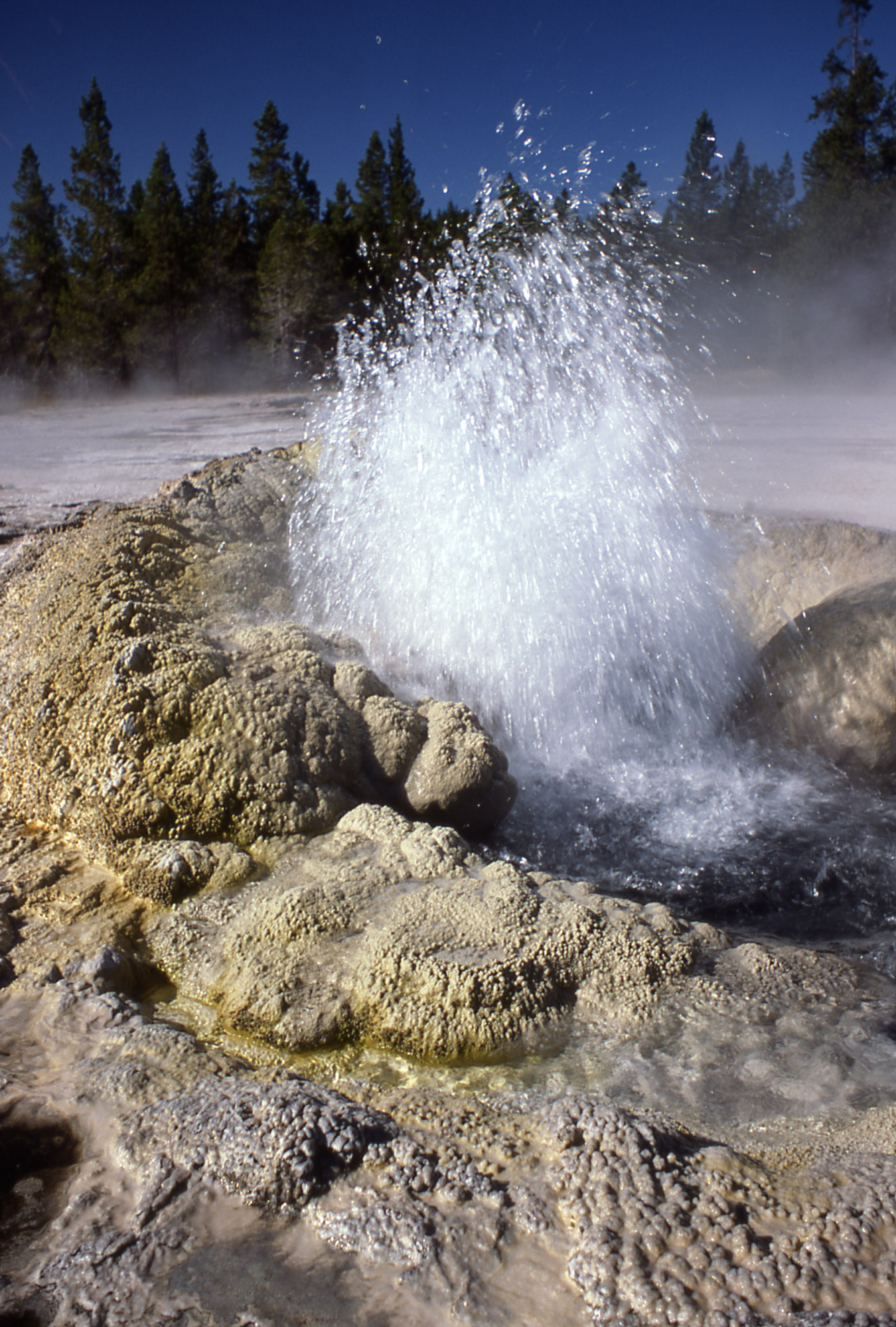
- Comet Geyser
- Interactive map of Comet Geyser
- Location: Upper Geyser Basin, Yellowstone National Park, Teton County, Wyoming
- Coordinates: 44°28′13″N 110°50′40″W
- Elevation: 7,336 feet (2,236 m)
- Type: Cone geyser
- Eruption height: < 6 feet (1.8 m)
- Duration: Constant
- Temperature: 88.5 °C (191.3 °F)

Comet Geyser is a geyser in the Upper Geyser Basin of Yellowstone National Park in the United States.

Comet Geyser is part of the Daisy Group which includes Daisy Geyser, Splendid Geyser and Brilliant Pool. As opposed to the other features in this group, Comet erupts almost continuously. Every few minutes it surges to a height of 6 feet (1.8 m). This constant eruption has led to it having the biggest sinter cone of any of the geysers in this group.

Comet might be interconnected with Daisy and Splendid Geysers, albeit to a lesser degree than Brilliant Pool. After an eruption of Splendid and sometimes after Daisy, the action of Comet slows but quickly returns to its normal level.

Comet Geyser was named by the Hague Party in 1904.
