= Fountain Paint Pot =

Mud pot located in Lower Geyser Basin in Yellowstone National Park

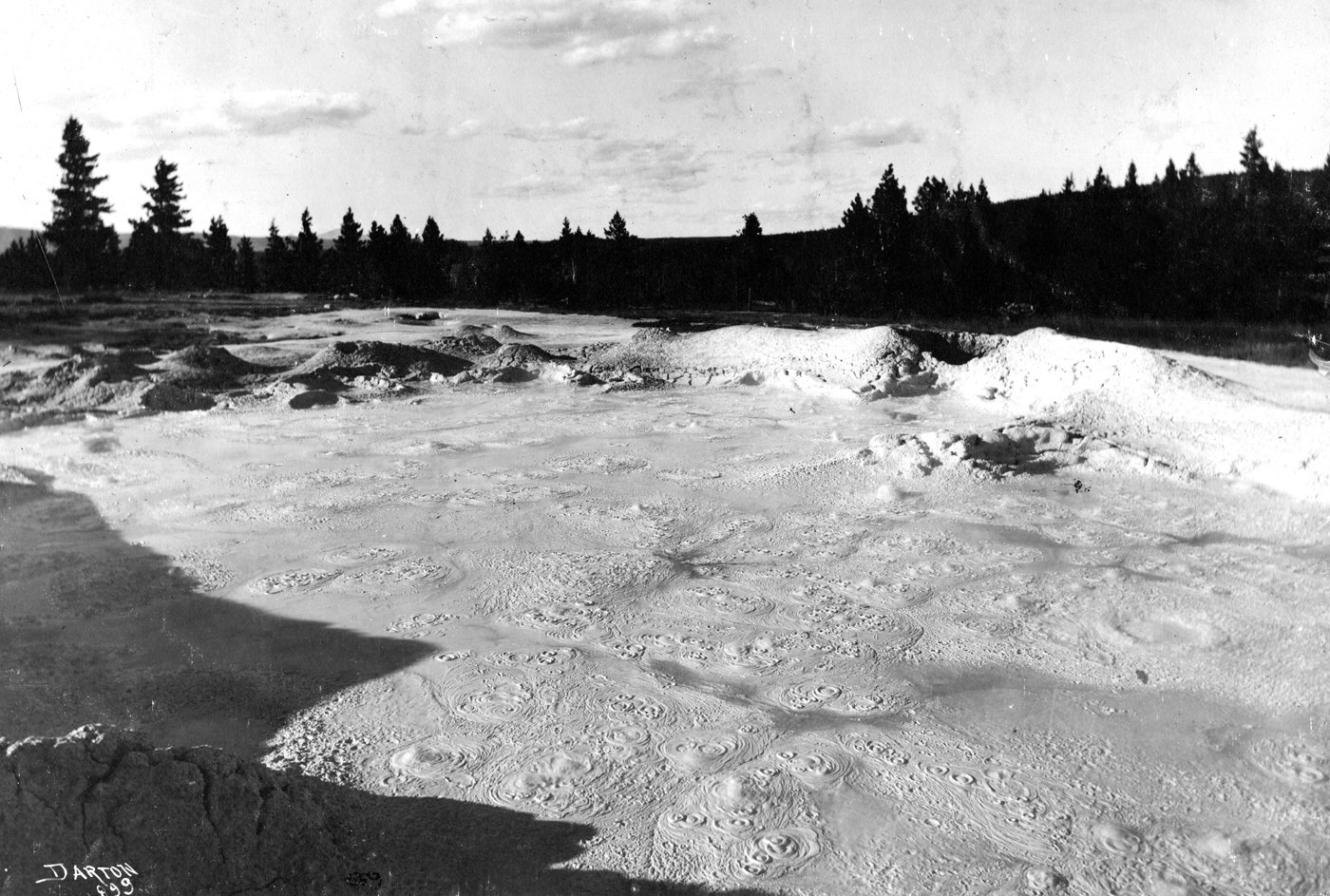
- Fountain Paint Pot, 1899

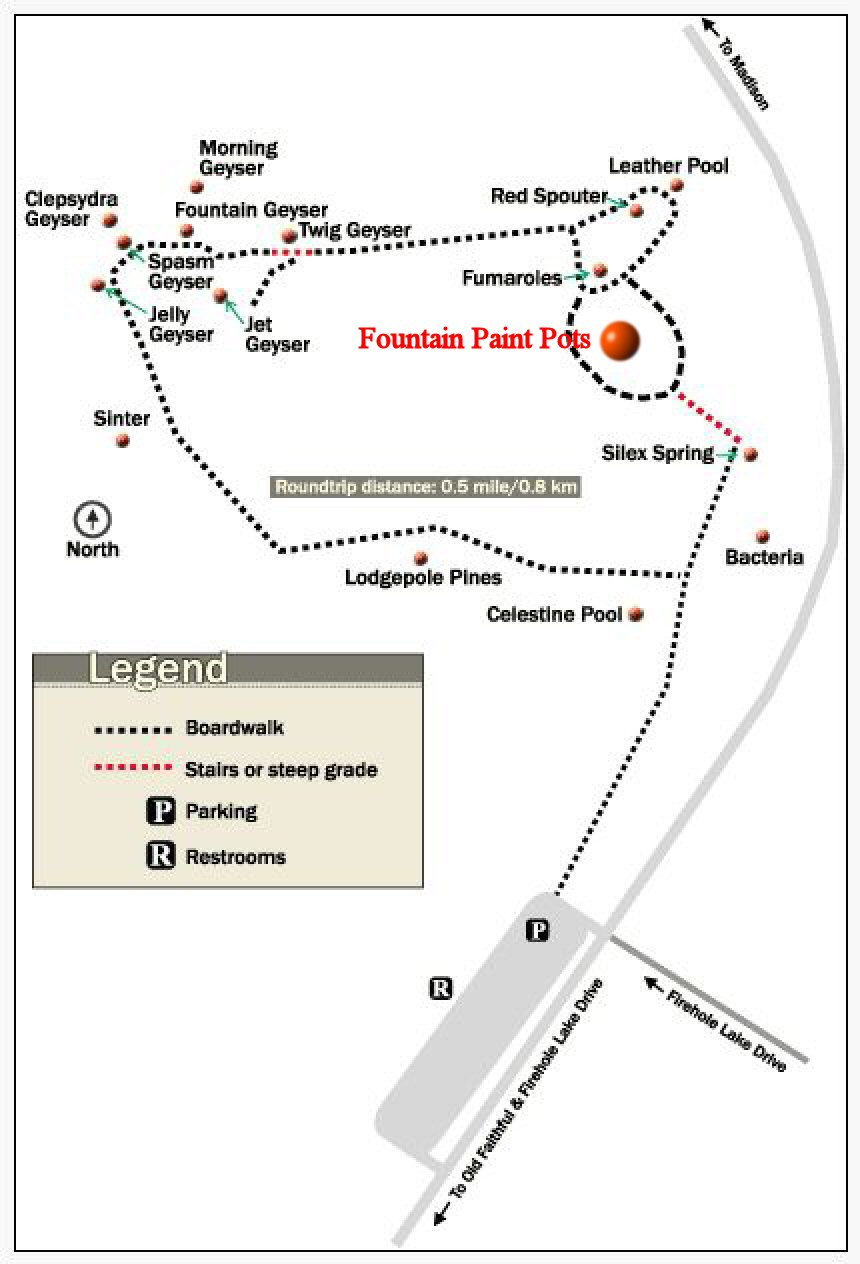
- Fountain Paint Pot
- Location: Lower Geyser Basin, Yellowstone National Park
- Coordinates: 44.550578°N 110.8062419°W
- Elevation: 7,306 feet (2,227 m)
- Type: Mud pot

The Fountain Paint Pot (often pluralized) is a mud pot located in Lower Geyser Basin in Yellowstone National Park.

The Fountain Paint Pot is named for the reds, yellows and browns of the mud in this area. The differing colors are derived from oxidation states of the iron in the mud. As with all hot springs, the heat in the caldera forces pressurized water up through the ground, which is expelled here. Also, rising gasses cause the bubbling action. The bubble action in the mud varies with the seasons. In the early summer, the mud is watery from the high water table due to rain and snow melt. By the end of summer, the mud is much thicker as the water table drops.

Several significant geysers erupt near the Paint Pots, notably Fountain Geyser, which usually has several large eruptions a day; Clepsydra Geyser, which is active most of the time except following an eruption of Fountain; and powerful but erratic Morning Geyser, active in the latter part of 2018 following a dormancy of nearly five years. These features and others are reachable by a short boardwalk trail from the parking lot on the main road through Lower Geyser Basin. Off-trail travel in this area is prohibited due to hazardous conditions.

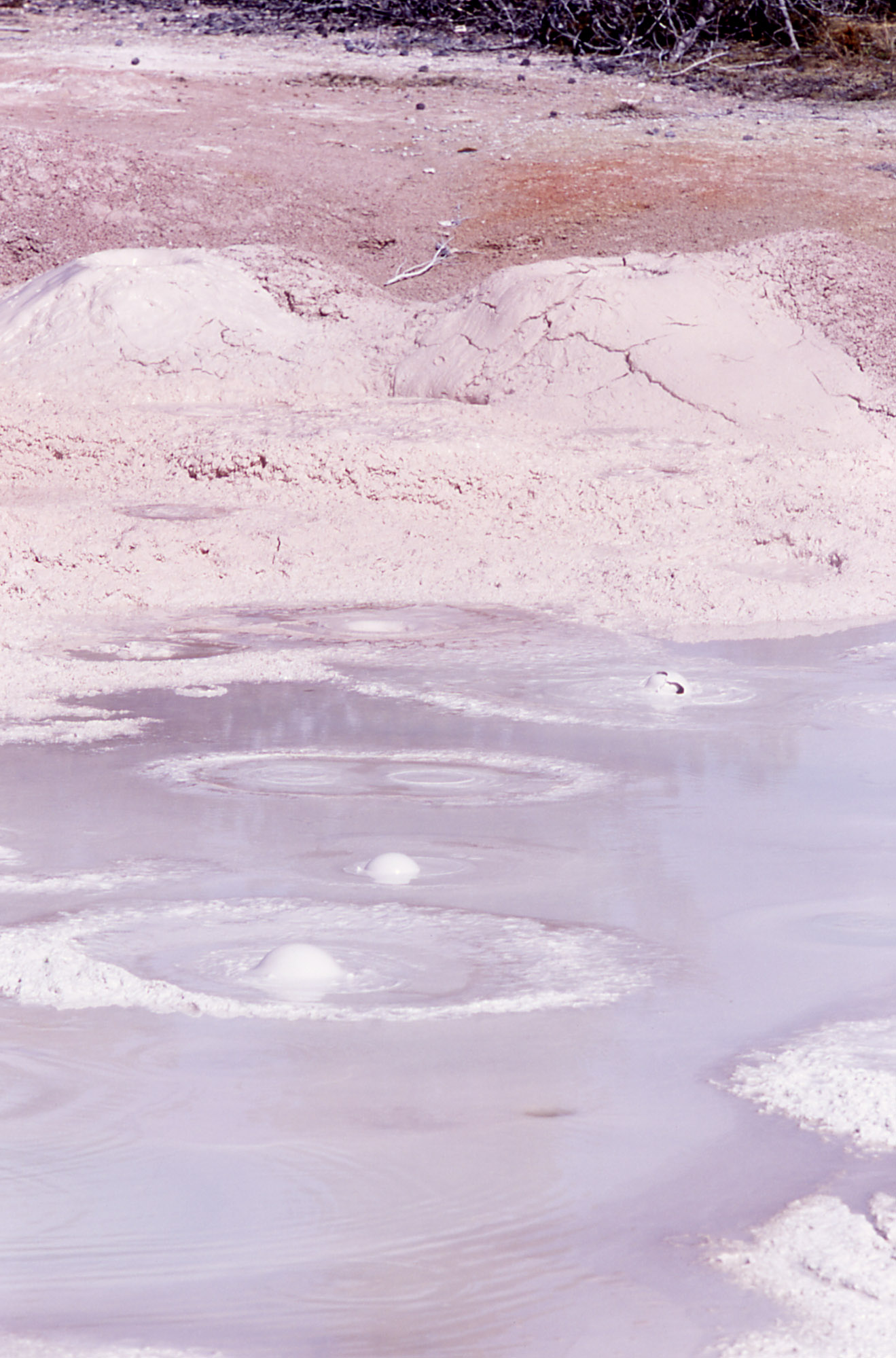
Closeup of the paintpots

Two large paintpots

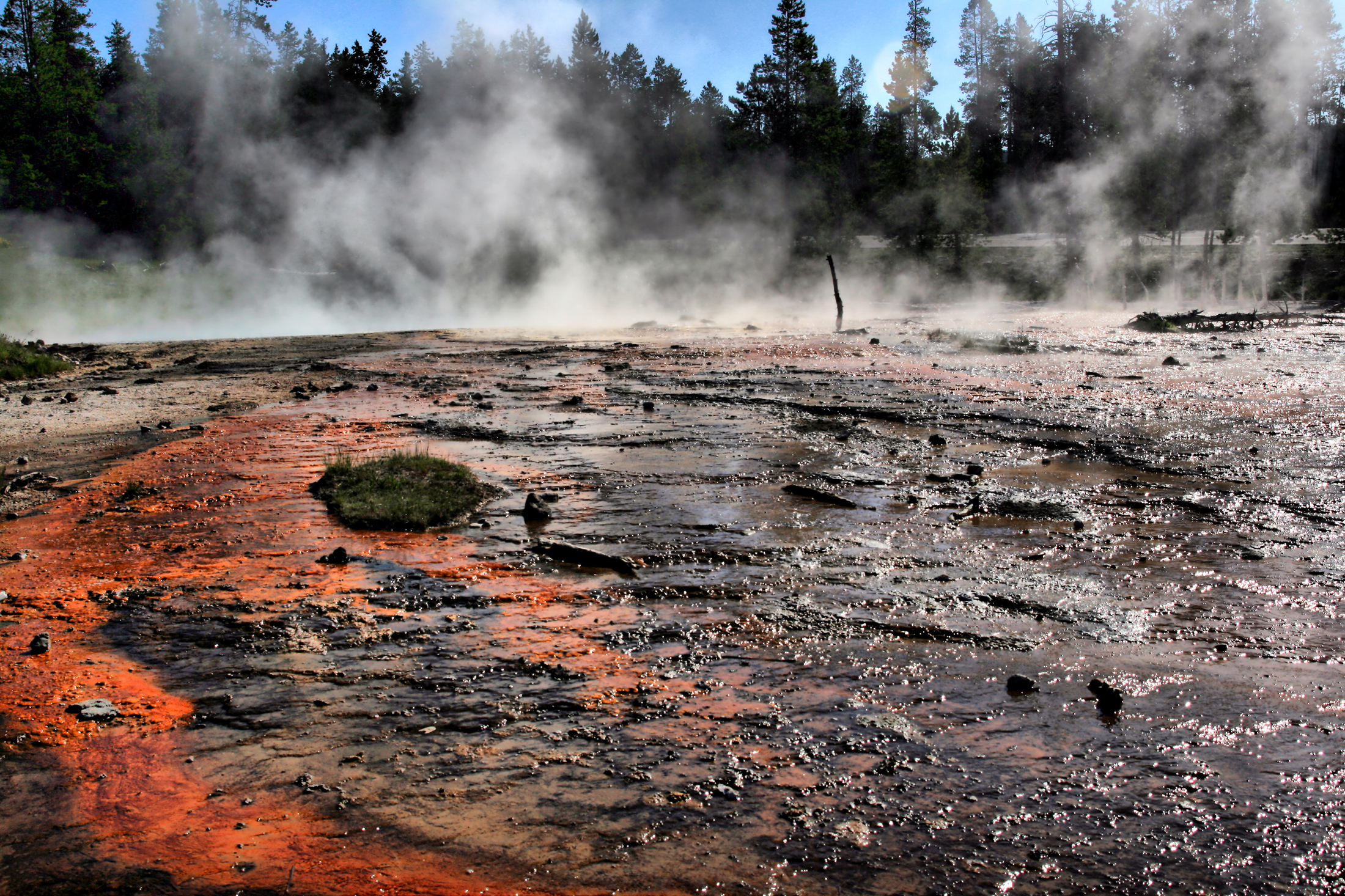
Overflow of Silex Spring
