= Vent Geyser =

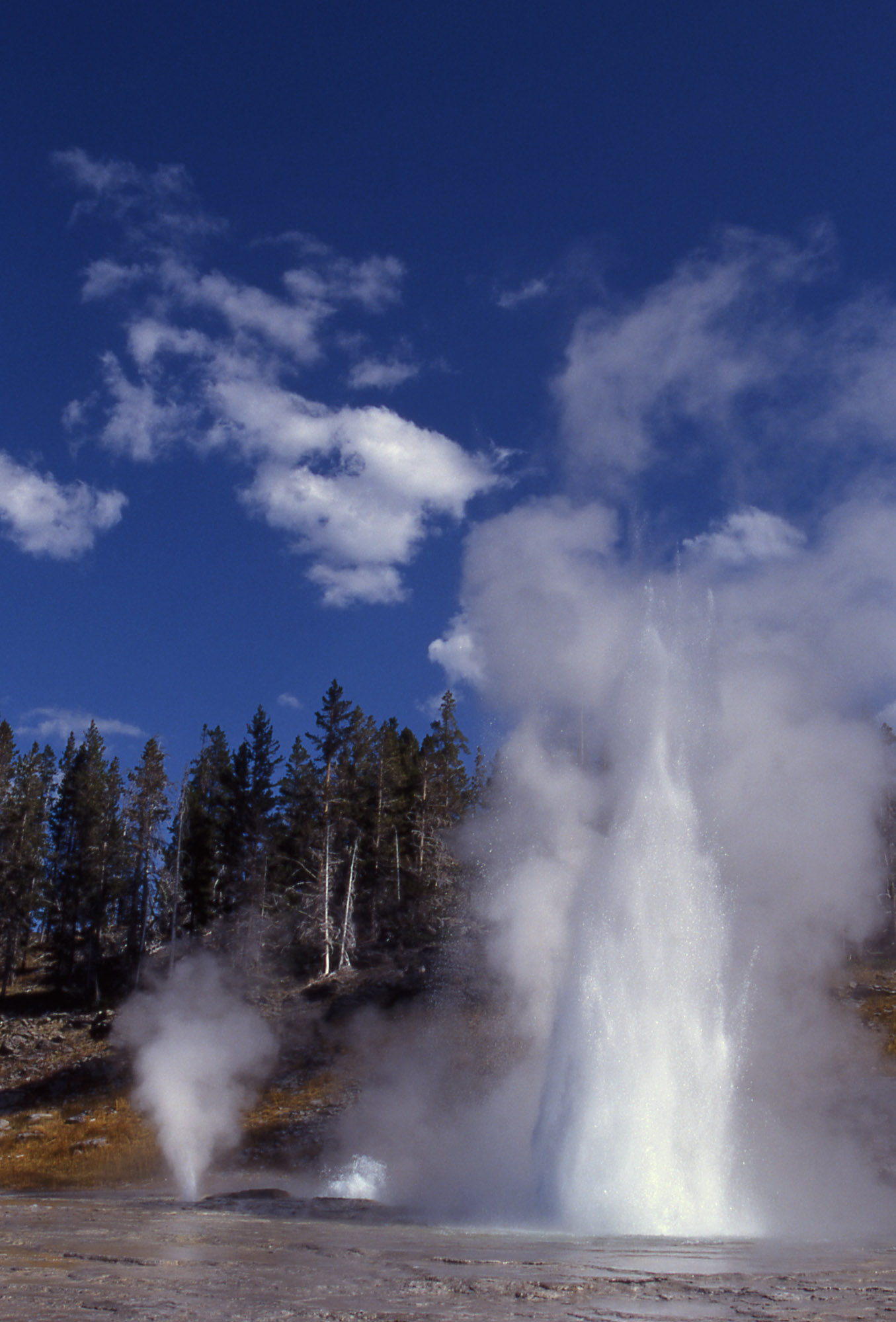
- Grand, Turban and Vent Geysers. Vent Geyser is the smaller fountain at the far left
- Interactive map of Vent Geyser
- Location: Upper Geyser Basin, Yellowstone National Park, Teton County, Wyoming
- Coordinates: 44°28′01″N 110°50′14″W
- Elevation: 7,346 feet (2,239 m)
- Type: Cone geyser
- Temperature: 79.9 °C (175.8 °F)

Vent Geyser is a geyser in the Upper Geyser Basin of Yellowstone National Park in the United States.

Vent Geyser belongs to the Grand Group (or Grand Geyser Complex), and its eruption is tied to Grand Geyser. Normally, it erupts immediately after Grand and continues to erupt intermittently for about an hour afterward along with Turban Geyser. On rare occasions, it has erupted before Grand or completely by itself. Its fountain reaches a height of 75 feet (23 m) initially then subsides to 20 to 40 feet (6–12 m). At times, it is not possible to see Vent erupting through the steam and spray of Grand Geyser.
