= Crystal Geyser =

Geyser in Utah

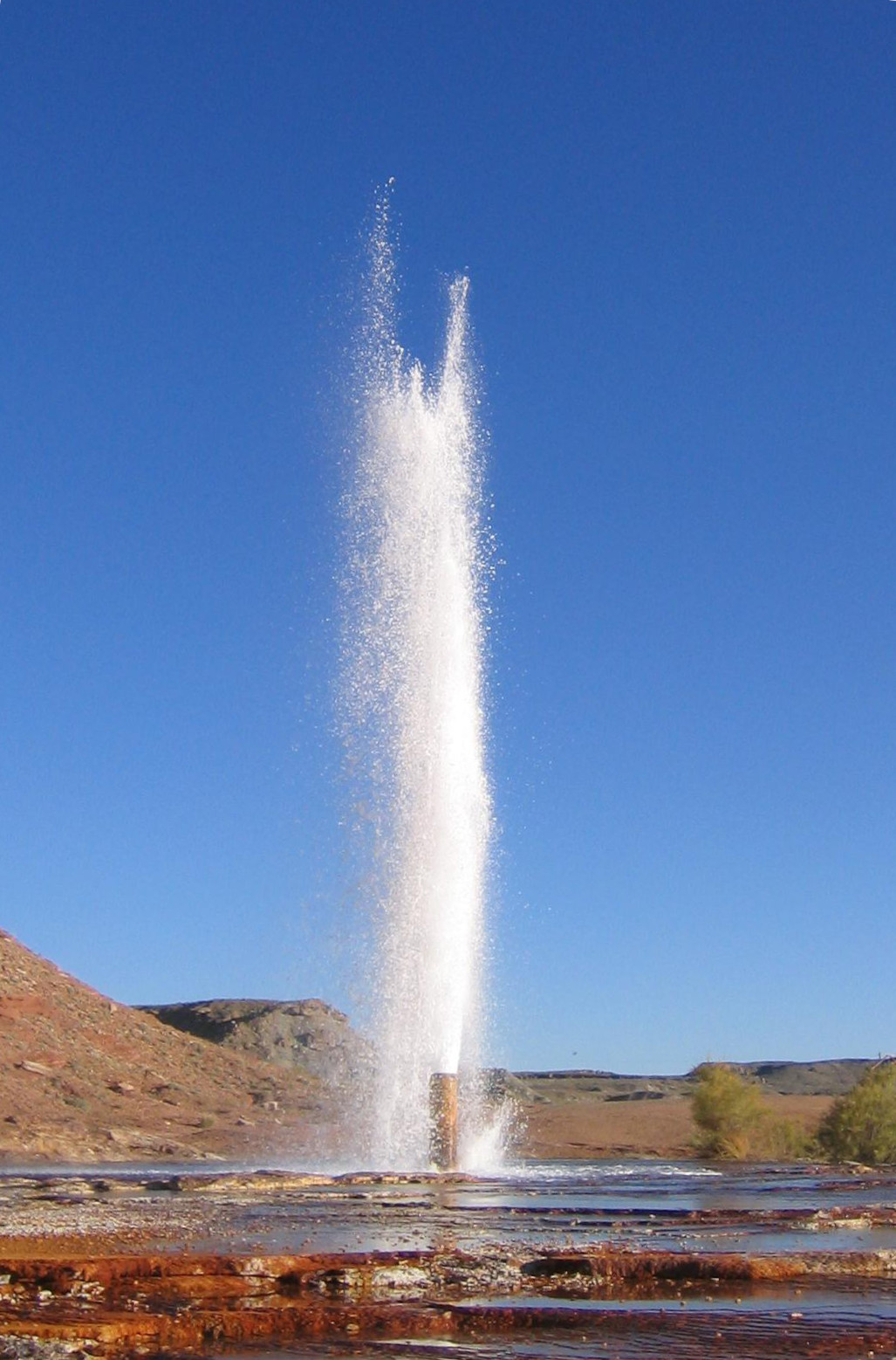
- Crystal Geyser erupting on October 11, 2005.

- Location within Utah
- Coordinates: 38.938253°N 110.135440°W
- Elevation: 4,062 feet (1,238 m)
- Type: Cold-water geyser

Crystal Geyser is a cold-water, carbon dioxide-driven geyser located on the east bank of the Green River about 9 miles (14 km) downstream from Green River, Utah, United States.

== History ==
The first written record of Crystal Geyser comes from the July 13, 1869, entry for the Powell Geographic Expedition of 1869 as reported in Powell's book, The Exploration of the Colorado River and Its Canyons:

An hour later we run a long rapid and stop at its foot to examine some interesting rocks, deposited by mineral springs that at one time must have existed here, but which are no longer flowing.

== Geology ==
Crystal Geyser is a cold-water geyser located just above the east bank of the Green River, roughly 9 miles (14 km) downstream from Green River, Utah. It is around 4,062 feet (1,238 m) above mean sea level. The area surrounding the modern geyser is covered in a thick layer of orange travertine, which is composed of couplets of highly porous, micritic laminae alternating with iron oxide-rich laminae. Aragonite is present near the vent and is replaced by magnesium-poor calcite farther away. Bacteria of the genus Leptothrix are probably responsible for the Frutexites‐like, iron-rich laminae. Pisoids ("pearls") form in pools near the vent.

It is a rare example of a cold-water, carbon dioxide-driven geyser; geothermal activity does not play a role in its activity. The groundwater near the geyser has significant quantities of dissolved carbon dioxide, along with substantial underground gas accumulations in the surrounding area. Saturation of the aquifer with CO_{2} creates enough pressure to force groundwater through the geyser and out on to the surface. The source of the groundwater is the nearby Green River, which flows along the Little Grand Wash Fault and dissolves the calcium carbonate from the underlying Middle Jurassic strata, particularly the Summerville Formation. The average geyser water temperature is 64.4 °F (18.0 °C)

== Eruptions ==
Historically, the geyser erupted to a height of 130 feet (40 m) or more. During 2005, a study of the timing of the eruptions found them to be bimodal. About 66% of eruptions in the study occurred about 8 hours after the previous eruption, and the rest about 22 hours after. The geyser erupts for an average of 100 minutes a day, with eruptions either lasting 7–32 minutes, or 98–113 minutes. The bimodal distribution of eruptions is not a well-understood pattern, but is found in other geysers, both cold-water and otherwise.

Between eruption events, the water level is about 17 feet below the surface of the geyser—at the level of the water table. In the preface to an eruption, water surfaces, fills the pond around the geyser, and begins to bubble. Bubbling events occur with increasing frequency in the time leading up to an eruption, but are not constant; bubbling events last for a few minutes, with a few minutes of calm in between. Bubbling events at the main geyser also frequently alternate with bubbling events at natural sidepools.

The current form of the geyser was created by an exploration well drilled in 1935 in attempt to locate oil. The well was originally 2,600 feet (790 m) deep, but an earlier owner of the land partially filled it in, meaning that the well is now only a few hundred feet deep.

The area surrounding the modern geyser is covered in a thick layer of orange travertine. Near the river, adjacent to the modern orange travertine, are substantial deposits of white travertine, perhaps reflecting the original depositional environment of the geyser (before the exploratory well was drilled.)

The average height of modern eruptions are less than 10 feet (3 m) in height. Speculation is that a geological event changed the geyser's underground structure. Some believe people filled the geyser with rocks in an effort to provoke eruptions.

== See also ==
- List of geysers
- Soda Springs, Idaho
- Wirthbacteria
