= Turban Geyser =

Geyser in Yellowstone National Park

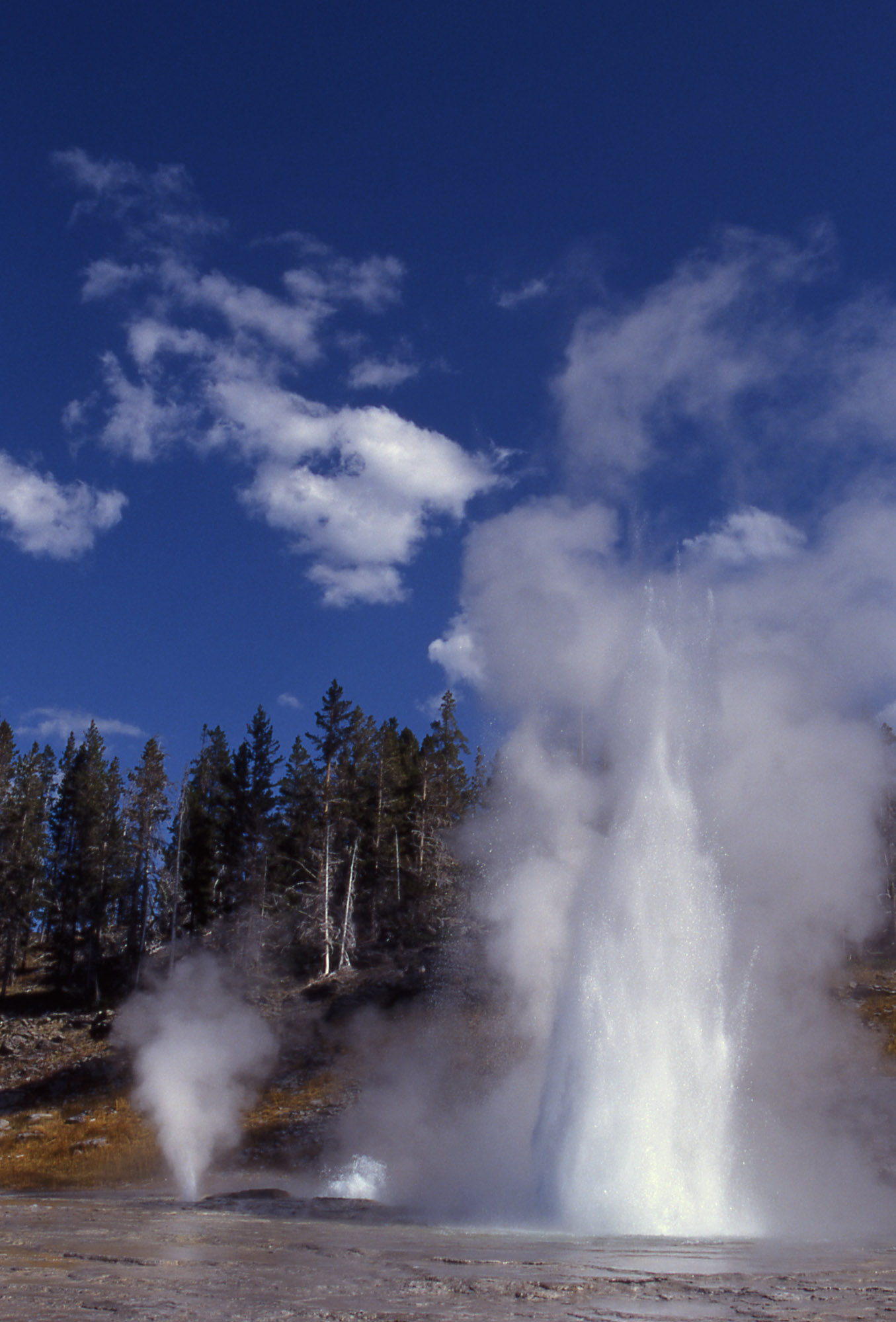
- Grand, Vent and Turban Geysers. Turban Geyser is the small bubbling geyser in the middle between Vent (left) and Grand (right)
- Interactive map of Turban Geyser
- Name origin: Dr. A.C. Peale, 1872
- Location: Upper Geyser Basin, Yellowstone National Park, Teton County, Wyoming
- Coordinates: 44.4666°N 110.834100°W
- Elevation: 7,405 feet (2,257 m)
- Type: Fountain geyser
- Temperature: 82 °C (180 °F)

Turban Geyser is a geyser in the Upper Geyser Basin of Yellowstone National Park in the United States.

Turban Geyser belongs to the Grand Group (or Grand Geyser Complex), and its eruption is tied to Grand Geyser. In the hours prior to Grand's eruption, Turban will have five-minute eruptions every 15–25 minutes. These eruptions measure 5–10 feet (2–3 m) in height. During Grand's eruption, Turban erupts continuously reaching up to 20 feet (6 m). Following an eruption of Grand, Turban will continue to erupt intermittently for an hour or so along with Vent Geyser. At times, it is not possible to see Turban erupting through the steam and spray of Grand Geyser.

Turban Geyser was named for the similarity in appearance of the sinter deposits in its basin to the turban headpiece. Dr. A.C. Peale named the geyser in 1872.
