= Brilliant Pool =

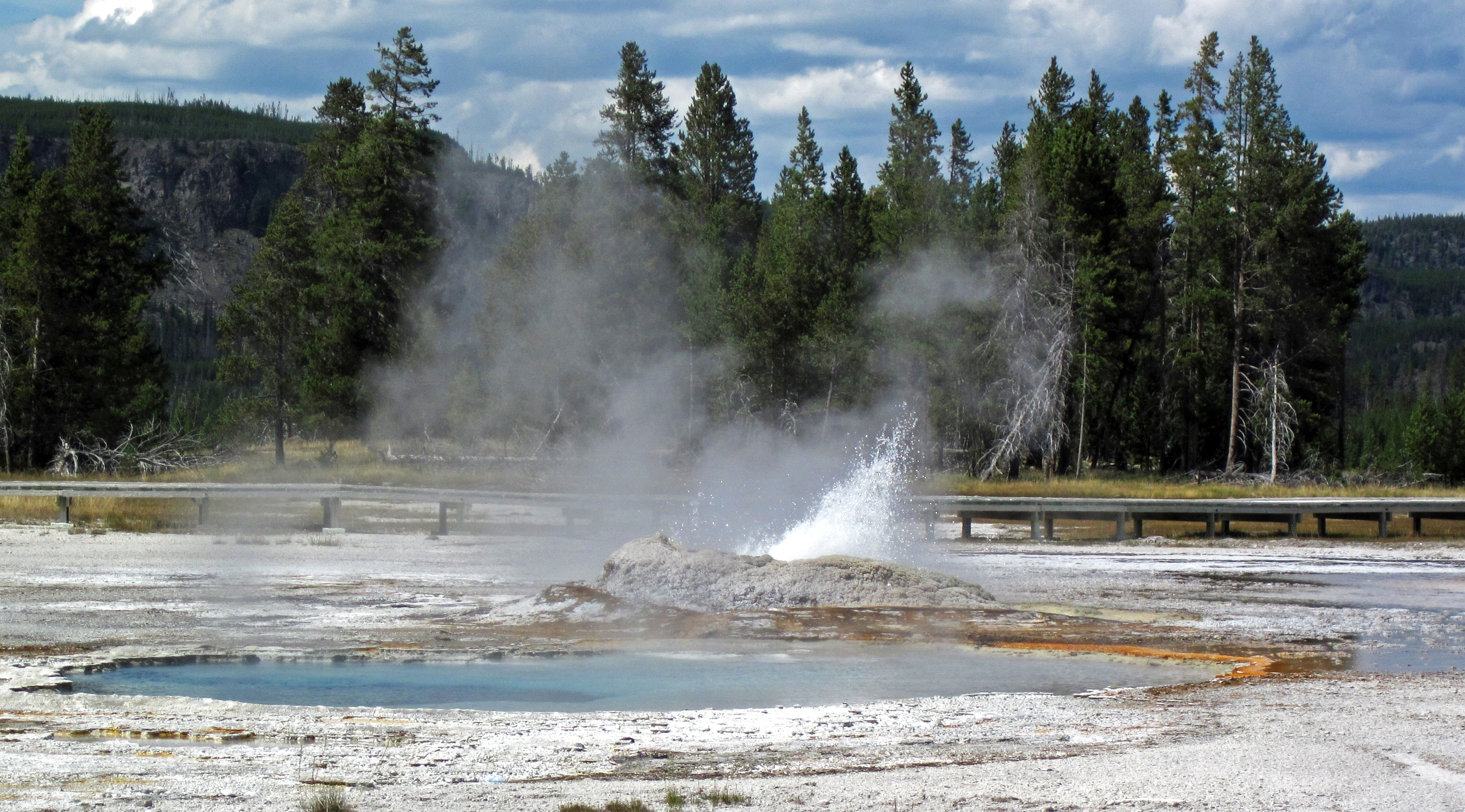
- Comet Geyser & Brilliant Pool (14 August 2015)
- Interactive map of Brilliant Pool
- Location: Upper Geyser Basin, Yellowstone National Park, Teton County, Wyoming
- Coordinates: 44°28′12″N 110°50′40″W
- Elevation: 7,336 feet (2,236 m)
- Temperature: 83.8 °C (182.8 °F)

Brilliant Pool is a hot spring in the Upper Geyser Basin of Yellowstone National Park in the United States. Brilliant Pool is part of the Daisy Group and is interconnected with the Daisy and Splendid Geysers. Prior to an eruption by Daisy or Splendid, the pool is filled.

When Daisy erupts, the water level in Brilliant Pool drops a few inches then is refilled as Daisy refills. A Splendid eruption has a larger effect on Brilliant Pool, dropping the level lower than a Daisy eruption. On occasion, Splendid will have a series of eruptions, preventing Brilliant Pool from refilling completely before the next eruption. In the event of a sustained series of Splendid eruptions or a dual Daisy/Splendid eruption, the water level in Brilliant Pool may drop low enough that it will have its own eruptions. These eruptions are short, usually lasting a few seconds, spaced a few minutes apart. The size of the fountain can reach as much as 15 feet but usually just breaks the surface of the pool.

Most of the time, the two geysers influence the behavior of the pool. On occasion, however, the pool can have an effect on a geyser. In the early 1950s, Brilliant Pool experienced a phase where it was overflowing. During this time, Daisy was dormant until the pool returned to its normal behavior.
