= Herľany geyser =

Geyser in Herľany, Slovakia

Geyser in Herľany
- Geyser
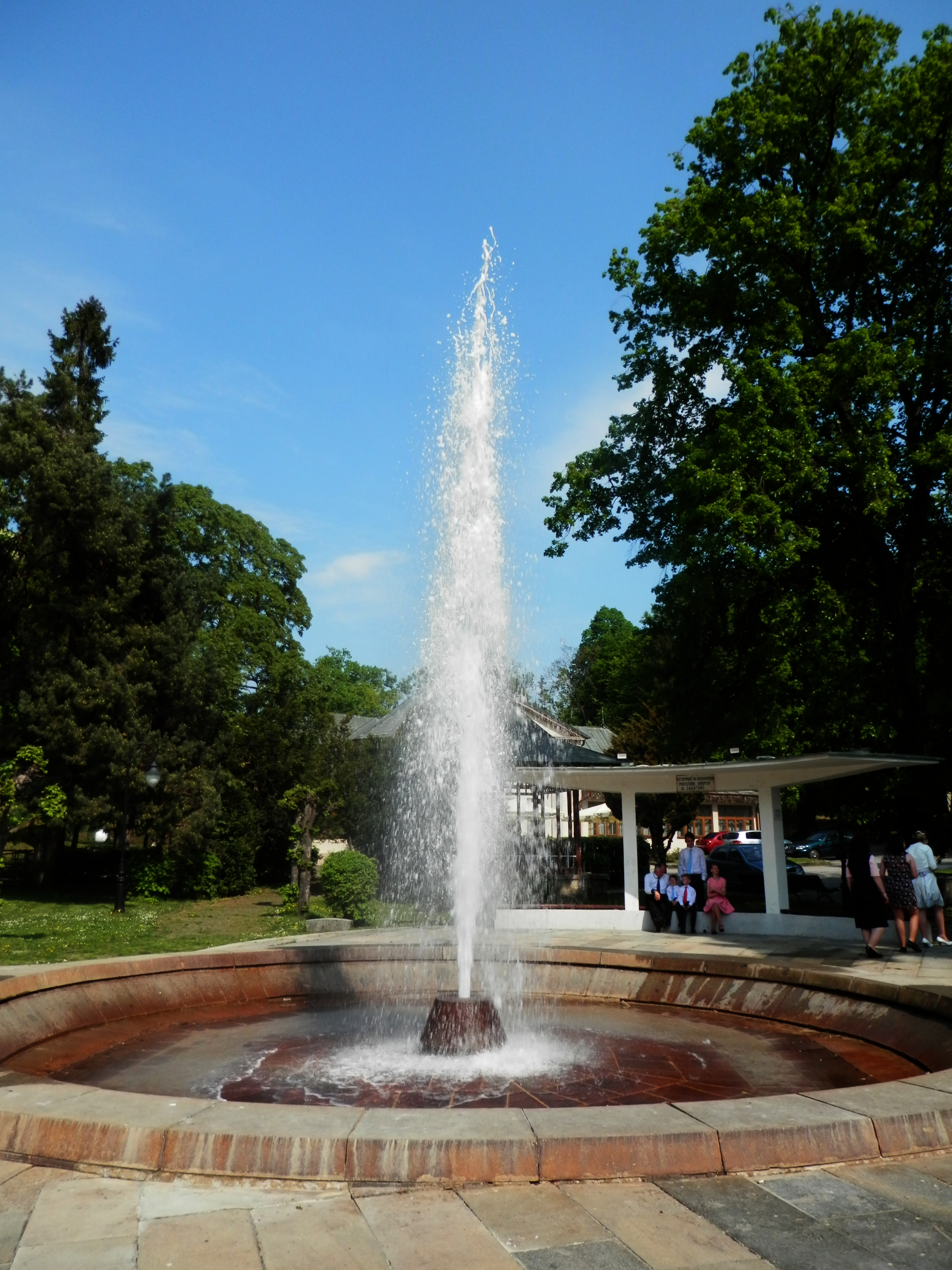
- Eruption of the Herľany Geyser in 2018

- Location within Slovakia
- Coordinates: 48°48′04″N 21°28′39″E
- Location: Herľany, Košice-okolie District, Slovakia

Herľany geyser (Slovak: Herliansky gejzír) is a geyser located in the village of Herľany in Slovakia. The geyser is a natural phenomenon activated by human activity, but the eruption is influenced by nature, including recent rainfall.

The Herľany Geyser is a rare cold geyser located at the foot of the Slanské vrchy Mountains, in the old spa area of the Herľany-Rankovce spa. It has been active continuously since 1872, and until 1903 and in the years 1957-2006 it was the only cold geyser in Europe.

The geyser was declared a national natural monument in 1987, and since 2002 it has been on the tentative list of UNESCO World Heritage Sites.

The geyser is a natural phenomenon activated by human activity by drilling a 404.5-meter-deep well. It sprays up to a height of 22 meters with a period of 34-36 hours, the eruption lasts approximately 25 minutes. The village's official website gives the time of the next expected eruption. According to a chemical analysis carried out in 1995, the water from the Herlany geyser is moderately mineralized, of the sodium-chloride-bicarbonate type. It is a natural bicarbonate-chloride, sodium, carbonic, sulfur hypotonic water. The average yield is 25-30 liters of water per second.

== History ==
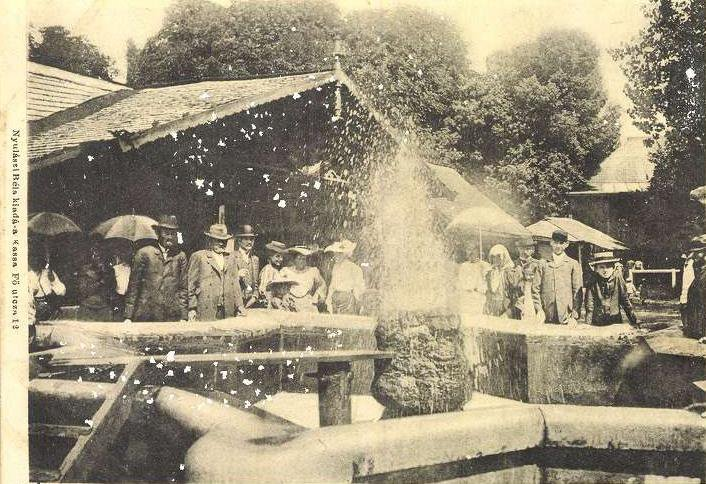
The geyser in the early 20th century.

In the 19th century, the demand for water was so high that the water from the springs in Herľany was not enough. Therefore, in 1870, officials began to dig a well, which was supposed to provide enough water.

The first significant eruption occurred in 1872 after drilling to a depth of 172 meters. A year later, water gushed from a depth of 275 meters, up to a height of 20 meters. A repeated eruption (7-8 hours) occurred after drilling to a depth of 330 meters. Drilling work continued until May 1875 (drilling to a depth of 404.5 meters). Initially, water from the geyser was collected in tanks, then heated and used in medicinal baths. By the end of the 19th century, more than 40 tanks were allegedly filled with it.

== See also ==
- List of geysers
- List of World Heritage Sites in Slovakia
