= Herľany =

Herľany Ránkfüred
- Municipality
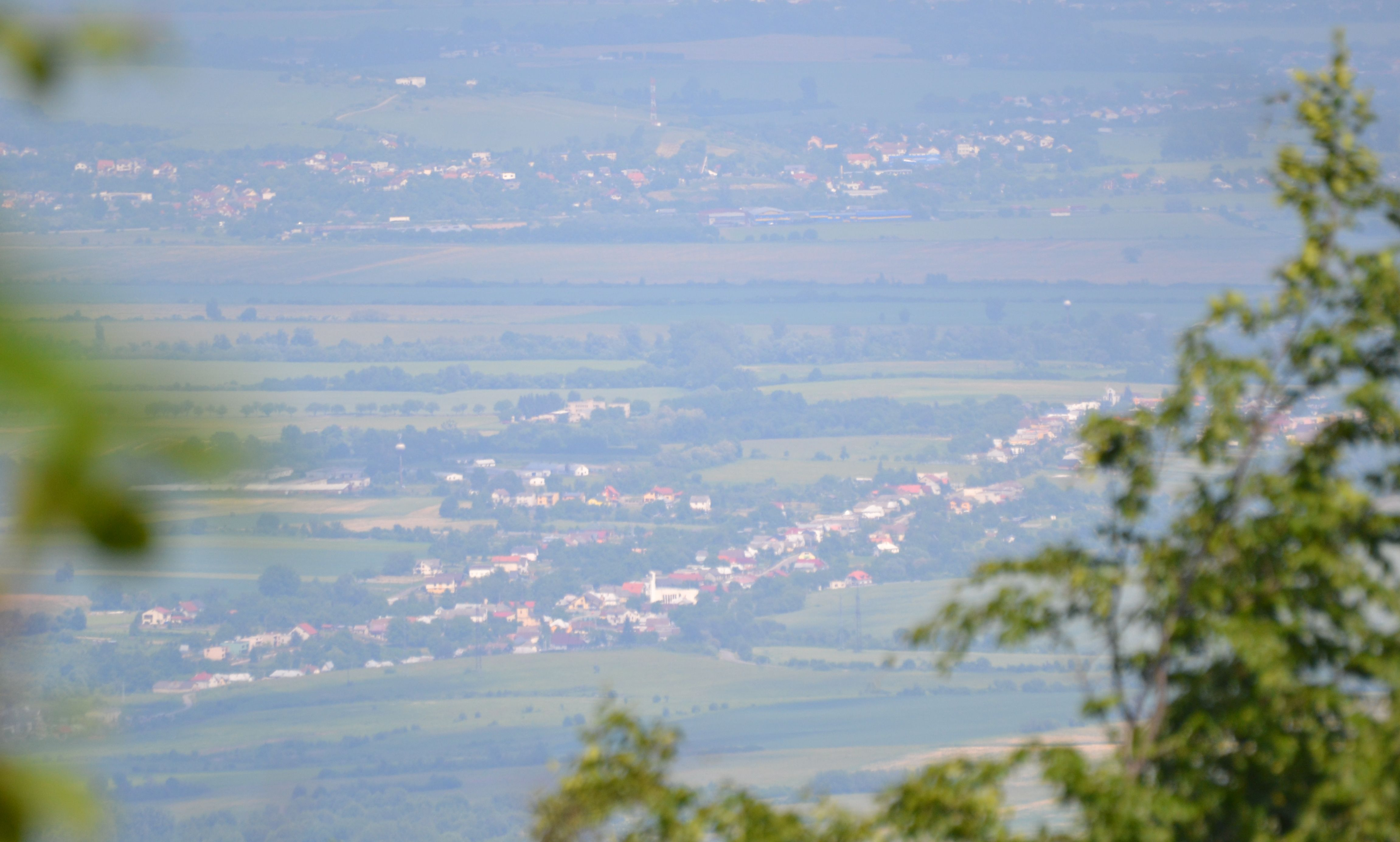

- Flag

- Location of Herľany in the Košice Region Location of Herľany in Slovakia
- Coordinates: 48.78°N 21.48°E
- Country: Slovakia
- Region: Košice Region
- District: Košice-okolie District
- First mentioned: 1487

Area
  - Total: 9.90 km^{2} (3.82 sq mi)
- Elevation: 361 m (1,184 ft)

Population (2025)
  - Total: 287
- Time zone: UTC+1 (CET)
  - Summer (DST): UTC+2 (CEST)
- Postal code: 444 6
- Area code: +421 55
- Vehicle registration plate (until 2022): KS
- Website: www.herlany.sk

Herľany (German: Herlein; Hungarian: Ránkfüred) is a village and municipality in Košice-okolie District in the Košice Region of eastern Slovakia.

== Geography ==
The municipality lies at an altitude of 361 metres (1,184 ft) and covers an area of 9.90 km^{2} (3.82 sq mi) (2025).

== Sights ==
The village is known for the Herľany geyser, the only full-scale geyser in Slovakia, and one of the few cold water geysers in the world. It erupts periodically every 34–36 hours, with the water reaching a height of 10–15 m since 1872. An eruption lasts around 25 minutes.

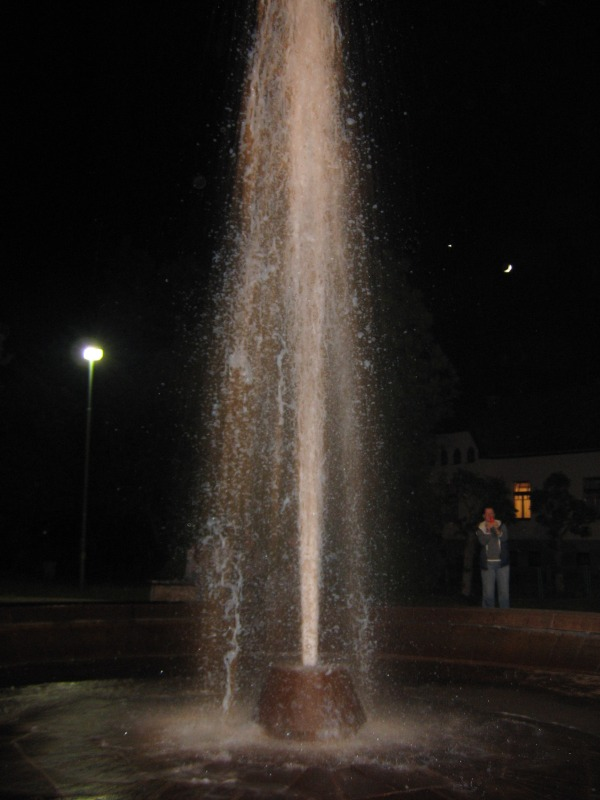

== Population ==
Population statistic (10 years)
Year	1995	2005	2015	2025
Count	298	287	289	287
Difference		−3.69%	+0.69%	−0.69%

Population statistic
Year	2024	2025
Count	286	287
Difference		+0.34%

It has a population of 287 people (31 December 2025).

=== Ethnicity ===
Census 2021 (1+ %)
Ethnicity	Number	Fraction
Slovak	279	97.55%
Rusyn	6	2.09%
Total	286	

In year 2021 was 286 people by ethnicity 279 as Slovak, 6 as Rusyn, 2 as Not found out, 2 as Hungarian, 1 as Czech and 1 as Other.

Note on population: The difference values of population numbers in the table "Population statistic" and in the sections "Ethnicity" & "Religion" is caused by the use of various statistical methods.

=== Religion ===
Census 2021 (1+ %)
Religion	Number	Fraction
Roman Catholic Church	139	48.6%
Evangelical Church	65	22.73%
None	39	13.64%
Greek Catholic Church	25	8.74%
Calvinist Church	11	3.85%
Eastern Orthodox Church	5	1.75%
Total	286	

In year 2021 was 286 people by religion 139 from Roman Catholic Church, 65 from Evangelical Church, 39 from None, 25 from Greek Catholic Church, 11 from Calvinist Church, 5 from Eastern Orthodox Church, 1 from Not found out and 1 from Ad hoc movements.

== Genealogical resources ==
The records for genealogical research are available at the state archive "Statny Archiv in Kosice, Slovakia"

- Roman Catholic church records (births/marriages/deaths): 1755-1895 (parish B)
- Greek Catholic church records (births/marriages/deaths): 1788-1912 (parish B)
- Lutheran church records (births/marriages/deaths): 1775-1895 (parish B)

== See also ==
- Herľany geyser
- List of municipalities and towns in Slovakia
- Sivá Brada
