= Grand Geyser =

Fountain geyser in the Upper Geyser Basin of Yellowstone National Park

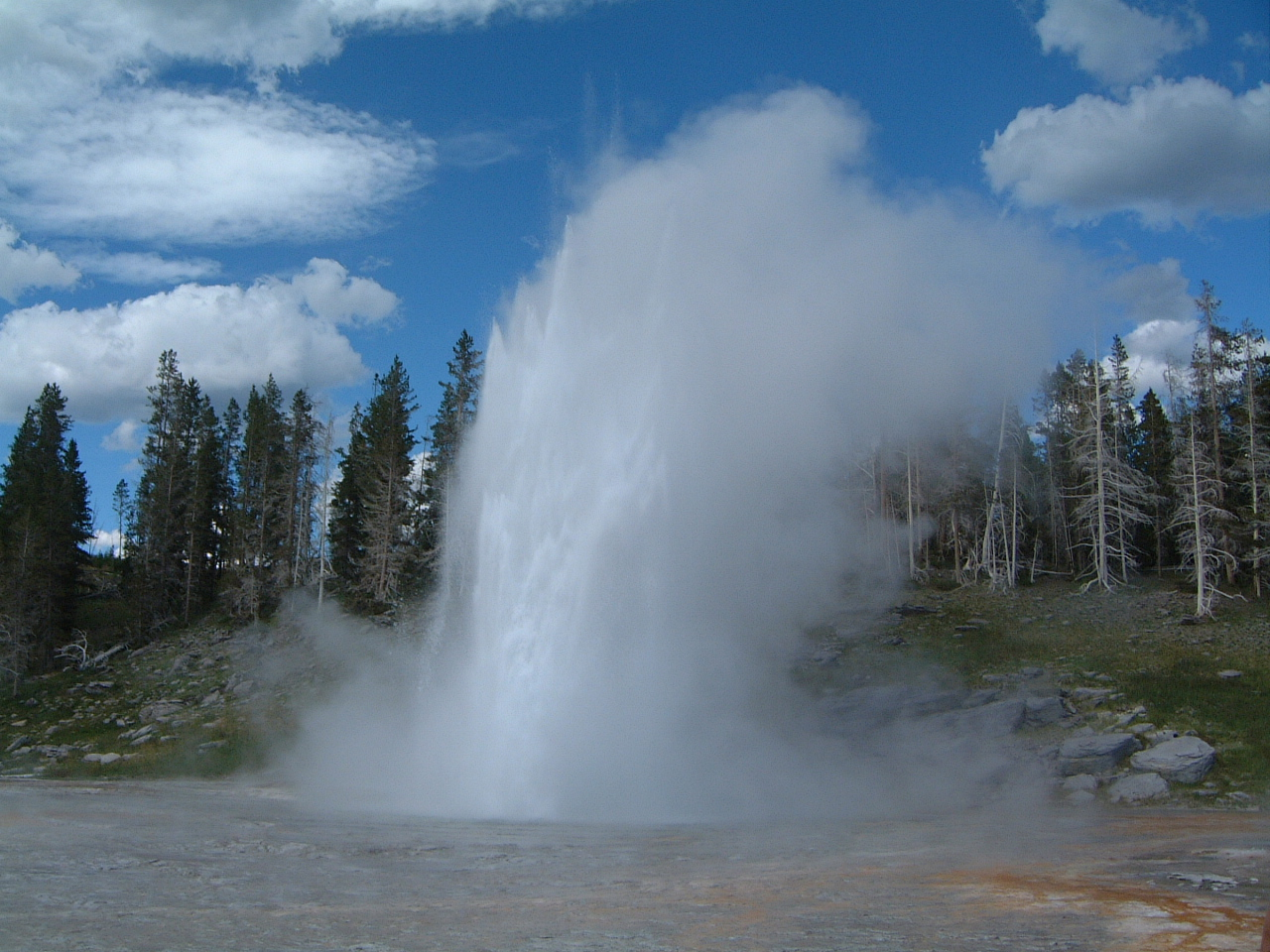
- Grand Geyser

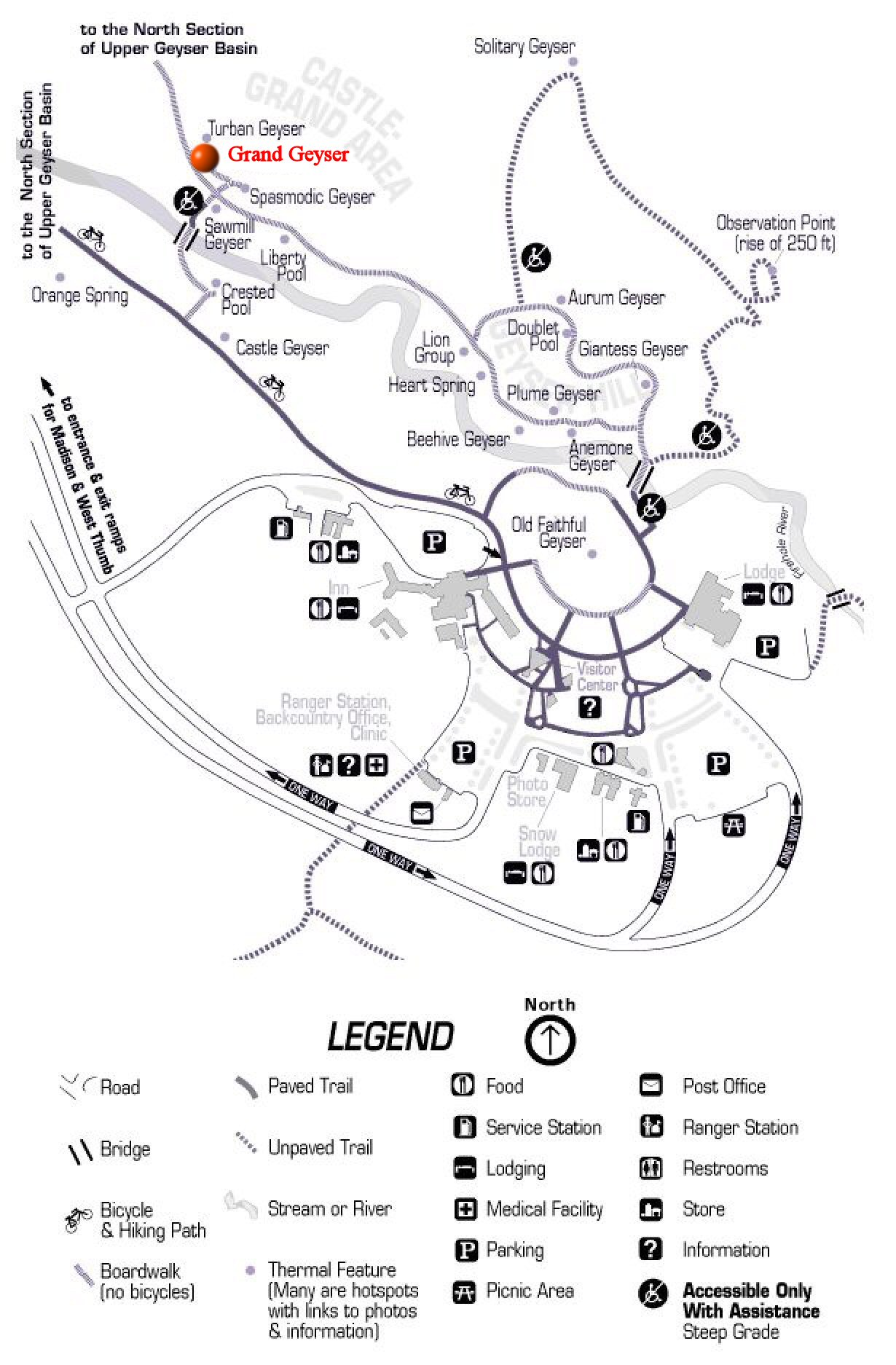
- Southern section of Upper Geyser Basin
- Name origin: Named during 1871 Hayden Geological Survey
- Location: Upper Geyser Basin, Yellowstone National Park, Teton County, Wyoming
- Coordinates: 44.4665996°N 110.8382669°W"Grand Geyser". Yellowstone Geothermal Features Database. Montana State University.
- Elevation: 7,329 feet (2,234 m)
- Type: Fountain geyser
- Eruption height: 200 feet (61 m)
- Frequency: 6 to 7 hours
- Duration: 9 to 12 minutes

Grand Geyser is a fountain geyser in the Upper Geyser Basin of Yellowstone National Park in the United States. It is the tallest predictable geyser known. It was named by Ferdinand Vandeveer Hayden in 1871.

== Eruptions ==
Grand's fountain reaches a height of as much as 200 feet (61 m), with a duration of 9 to 12 minutes. Its eruptions occur in a series of 1 to 4 (rarely as many as 5) bursts.

== Sequence ==
Grand erupts every 4 to 8 hours. It belongs to the Grand Group (or Grand Geyser Complex), and its eruption is connected to those of the other geysers in the group, especially the adjacent Vent Geyser and Turban Geyser.

For a few hours before an eruption by Grand, Turban Geyser erupts for a duration of five minutes about every 17 to 22 minutes. Grand's eruption begins within 1 to 2 minutes of the start of one of Turban's eruptions, it can also erupt just before Turban's eruption begins, with Vent Geyser erupting shortly after Grand starts erupting. On occasion, Grand will stop erupting after 7 to 9 minutes, only to restart with a usually taller fountain a minute or two later. Grand has been known to rarely experience over half a dozen restarts in a single eruption period. After Grand ceases its eruption, Vent and Turban can continue to erupt for another hour. As of 2018, Grand Geyser has become extremely predictable, with nearly every eruption being 6–7 hours apart.

Upon the finish of an eruption, Grand's pool is empty and takes about five hours to refill.

Images of Grand Geyser
Grand Geyser erupting in 2019

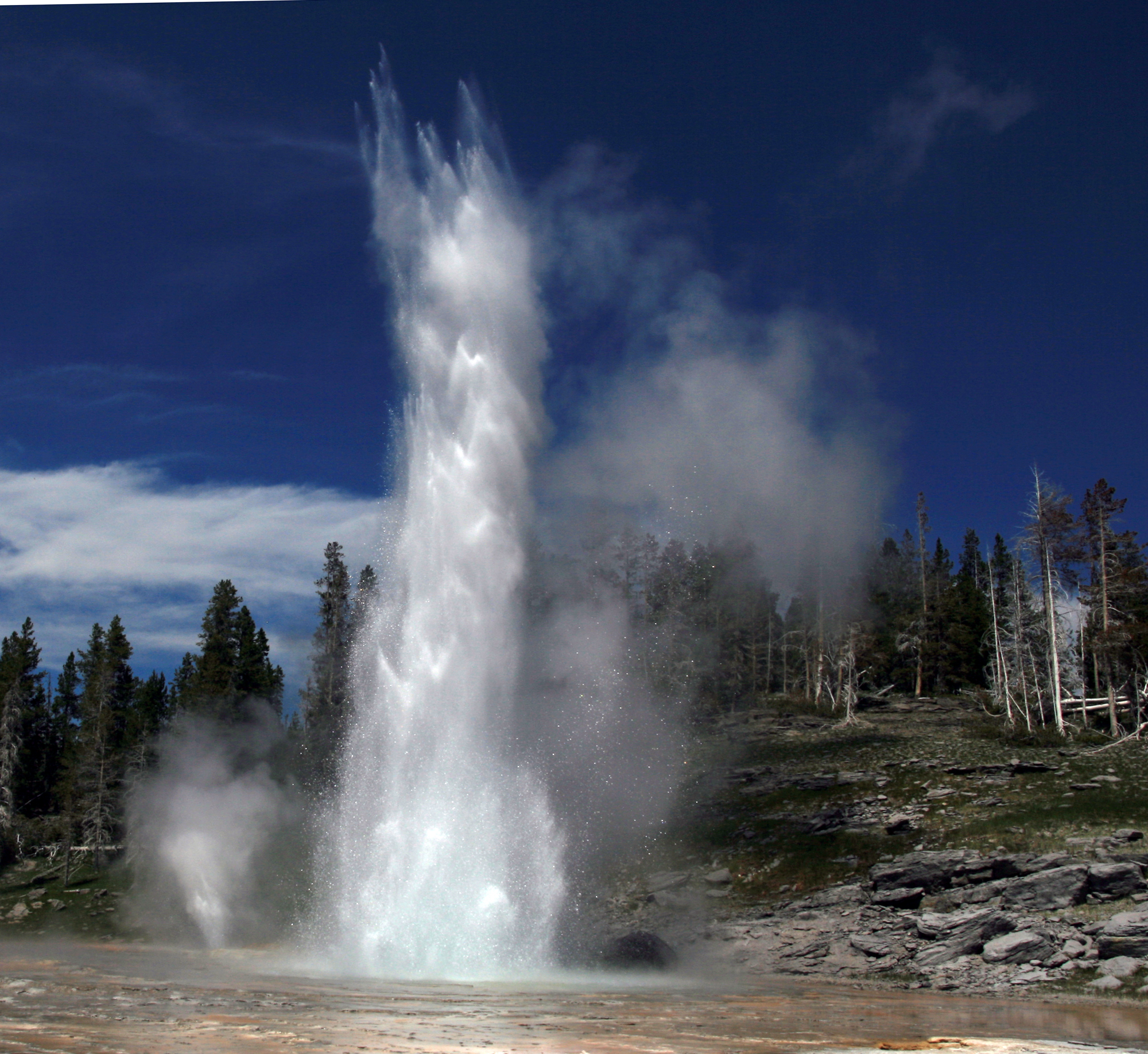
Grand Geyser. The small geyser on the left is Vent Geyser. 2008

Grand Geyser in 2005

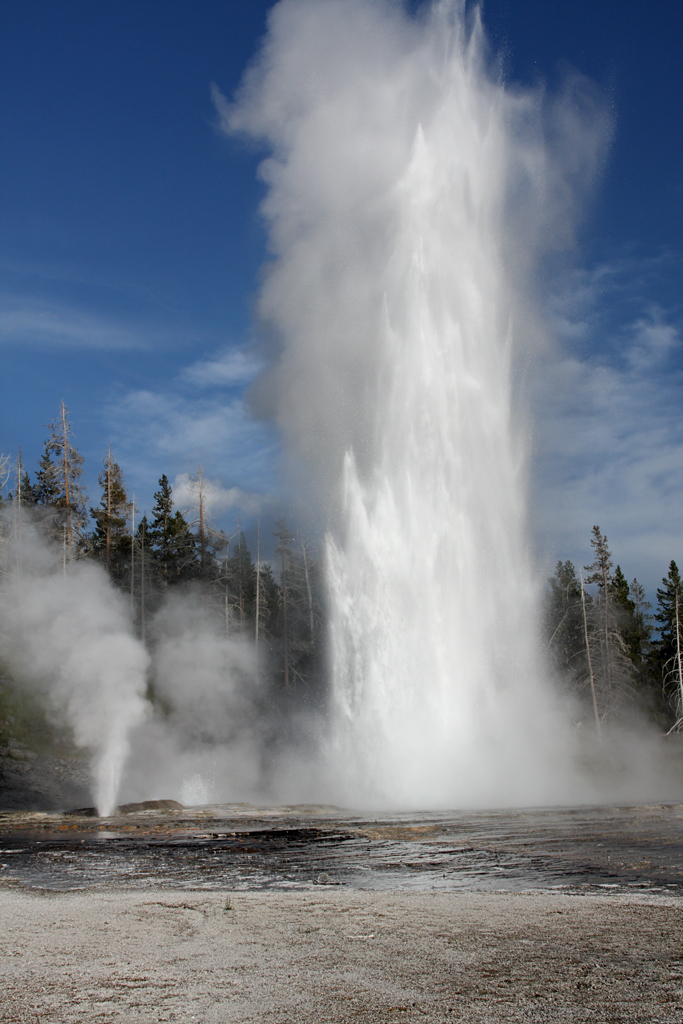
Grand Geyser in 2009
