= Varvarco =

- Municipality and village
- Location within Neuquén Province Location within Argentina
- Coordinates: 36°48′S 70°42′W
- Country: Argentina
- Province: Neuquén Province
- Time zone: UTC−3 (ART)
- Climate: Csb

Varvarco is a village and municipality in Neuquén Province in southwestern Argentina.

== History ==
During the final stages of the independence wars Varvarco, located in indigenous territory, became the main base of the Pincheira brothers, a royalist outlaw gang. More than a hideout the operations of the Pincheiras and their indigenous allies effectively turning Varvarco into a large town with 2,000 Chilean women and 40,000 heads of cattle grazing in the nearby countryside.
