= Daisy Geyser =

Geyser in the Upper Geyser Basin of Yellowstone National Park

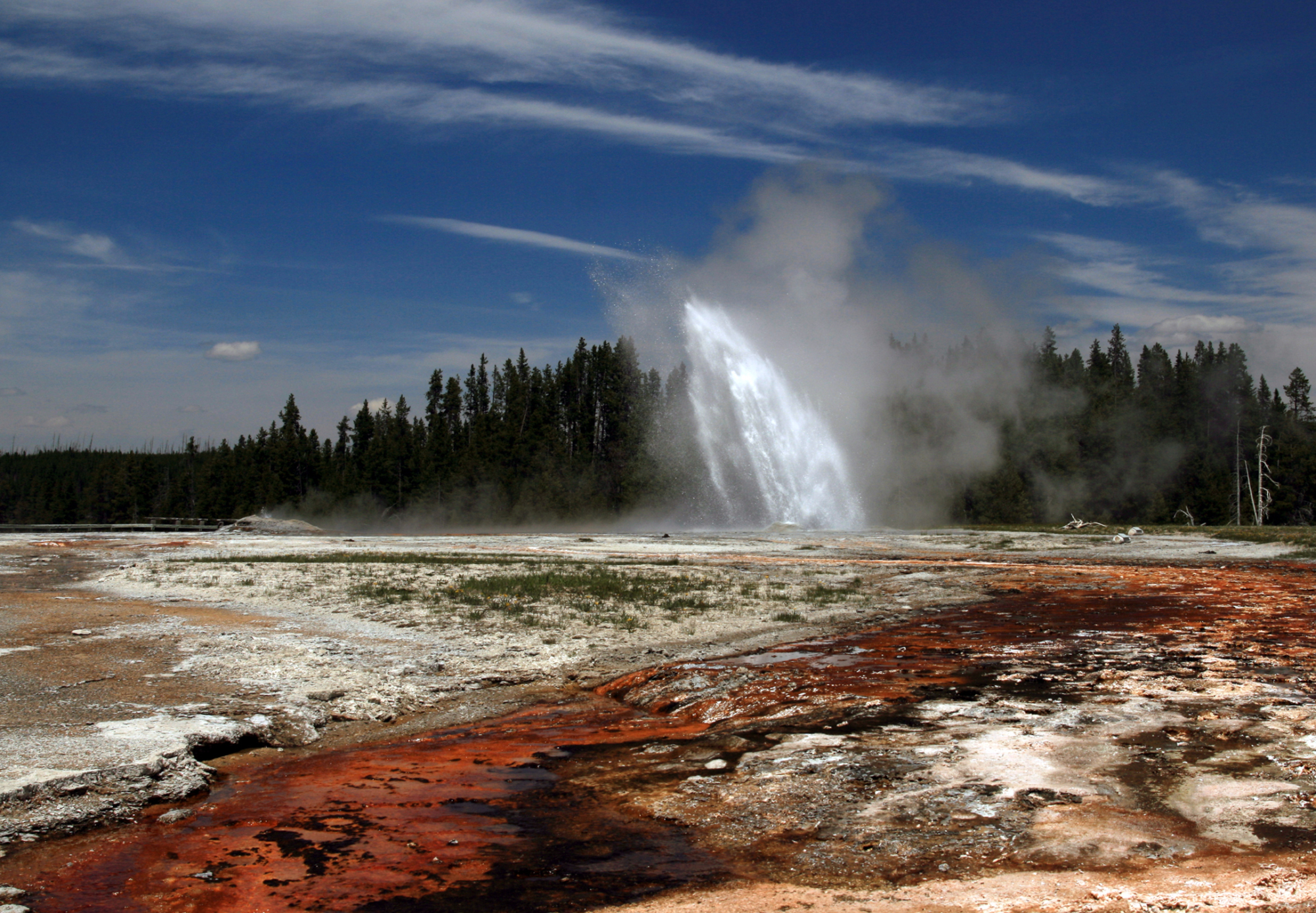
- Daisy Geyser during an eruption

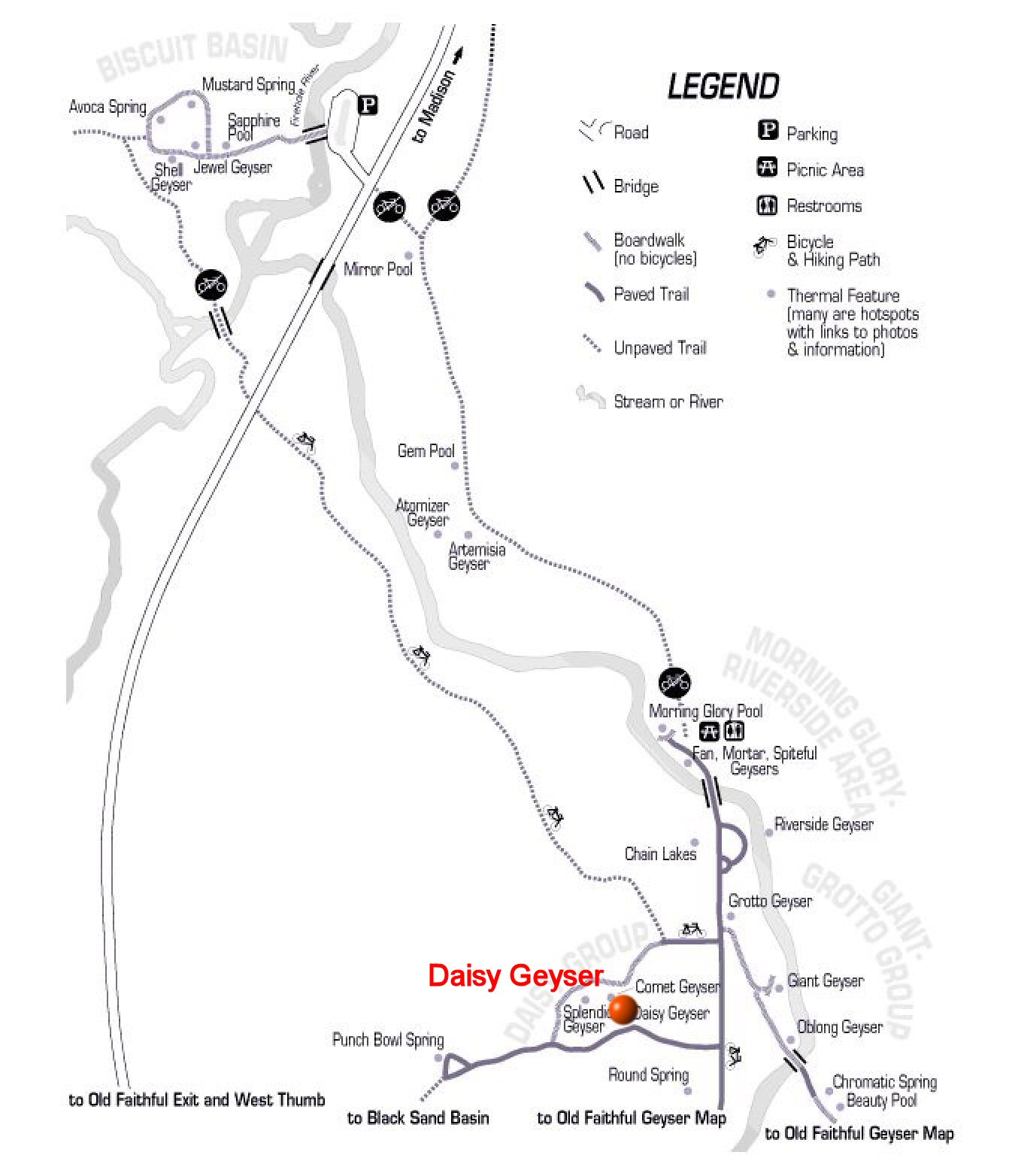
- Map of Upper Geyser Basin
- Name origin: Hague Geological Surveys, 1880s
- Location: Upper Geyser Basin, Yellowstone National Park, Teton County, Wyoming
- Coordinates: 44°28′12″N 110°50′42″W
- Elevation: 7,339 feet (2,237 m)
- Type: Cone geyser
- Eruption height: 60–75 feet (18–23 m)
- Frequency: 120 to over 200 minutes
- Duration: 3-4 minutes
- Temperature: 84.5 °C (184.1 °F)

Daisy Geyser is a geyser in the Upper Geyser Basin of Yellowstone National Park in the United States.

Daisy Geyser is part of the Daisy Group. It was named prior to 1890 by the Hague Party. It erupts every 110 to 240 minutes for a period of 3 to 5 minutes and is one of the most predictable geysers in the park. Its fountain erupts at an angle to the ground and reaches a height of 75 feet (23 m). The interval between eruptions can be temporarily altered by an eruption of nearby Splendid Geyser. To a smaller degree, Brilliant Pool and Comet Geyser are influenced by Splendid and Daisy.

Daisy Geyser was one of the Yellowstone geysers that had its eruption interval disrupted by the 2002 Denali earthquake, in Alaska. Immediately after the quake, the interval rapidly decreased but returned to previous intervals over the course of a few weeks.

Images of Daisy Geyser
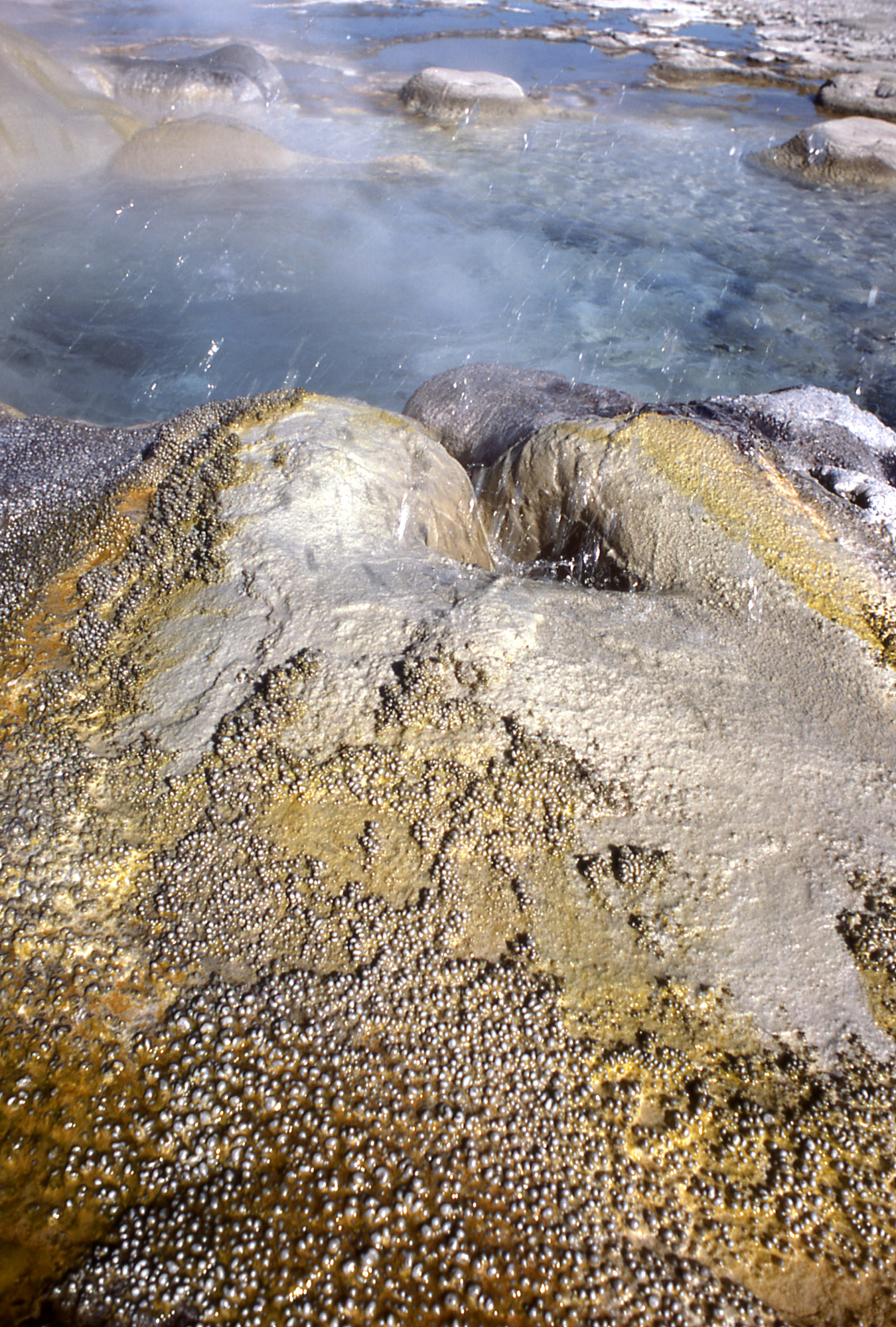
Daisy Geyser's Vent
