= Morning Geyser =

Geyser in the Lower Geyser Basin of Yellowstone National Park

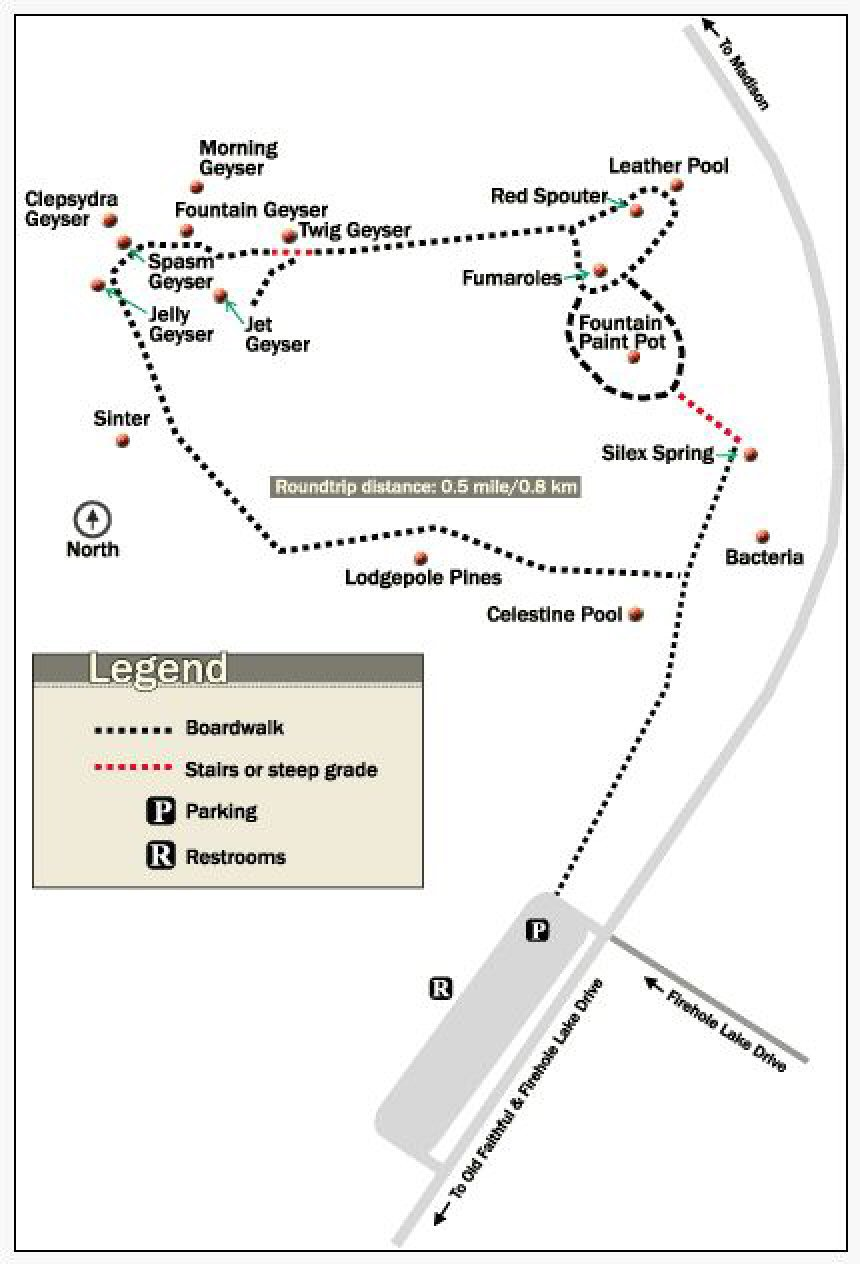
- Map of the Fountain Paint Pots group showing the location of Morning Geyser
- Location: Lower Geyser Basin, Yellowstone National Park, Wyoming
- Coordinates: 44.5514313°N 110.8082572°W
- Type: Fountain geyser
- Eruption height: 75 feet (23 m) to 200 feet (61 m), and just as wide.
- Frequency: 5 hours to 7 days when active, long dormancies
- Duration: approx. 30 minutes

Morning Geyser is a fountain-type geyser located in the Fountain Paint Pots area of Lower Geyser Basin of Yellowstone National Park, Wyoming. When active it is the largest geyser in the Fountain Paint Pots area, but in most years it is inactive.

== Eruption ==
Morning Geyser plays from a pool just beyond that of more frequently active Fountain Geyser, as seen from the boardwalk trail through the Fountain Paint Pots. Morning's maximum height may reach 200 feet (61 m) and just as wide, although most eruptions are smaller. Its duration is usually about 30 minutes, but durations of over one hour have been seen. Eruptions take the form of successive jets of water rather than a constant stream, many starting from a "blue bubble" resembling those observed at Fountain. Morning is sometimes observed to erupt simultaneously with Fountain, although most eruptions are independent.

The first recorded eruptions of Morning Geyser were in 1899, at which time it was called "New Fountain Geyser." Eruptions were rare until 1959, when the 1959 Hebgen Lake earthquake (just outside the park) caused significant changes in the activity in the Fountain Paint Pots group of springs. Morning was comparatively active from 1991 through 1993 but then erupted only rarely until 2012. Reactivation occurred in that year, and eruptions were more frequent in late 2012 and 2013, with intervals as short as 6 hours, although more typical intervals ranged from 11 hours to several days. No eruptions were recorded between October 2013 and August 2018; however, the geyser has again been active in the second half of 2018.

A less powerful geyser known as "Morning's Thief" erupts from a vent adjacent to Morning's pool. Morning's Thief has erupted frequently during the last ten years, and has been thought to rob Morning of the energy necessary for an eruption. However, a simultaneous eruption of Morning and Morning's Thief was observed during the former's 2013 active cycle.
