= Splendid Geyser =

Geyser in Yellowstone National Park

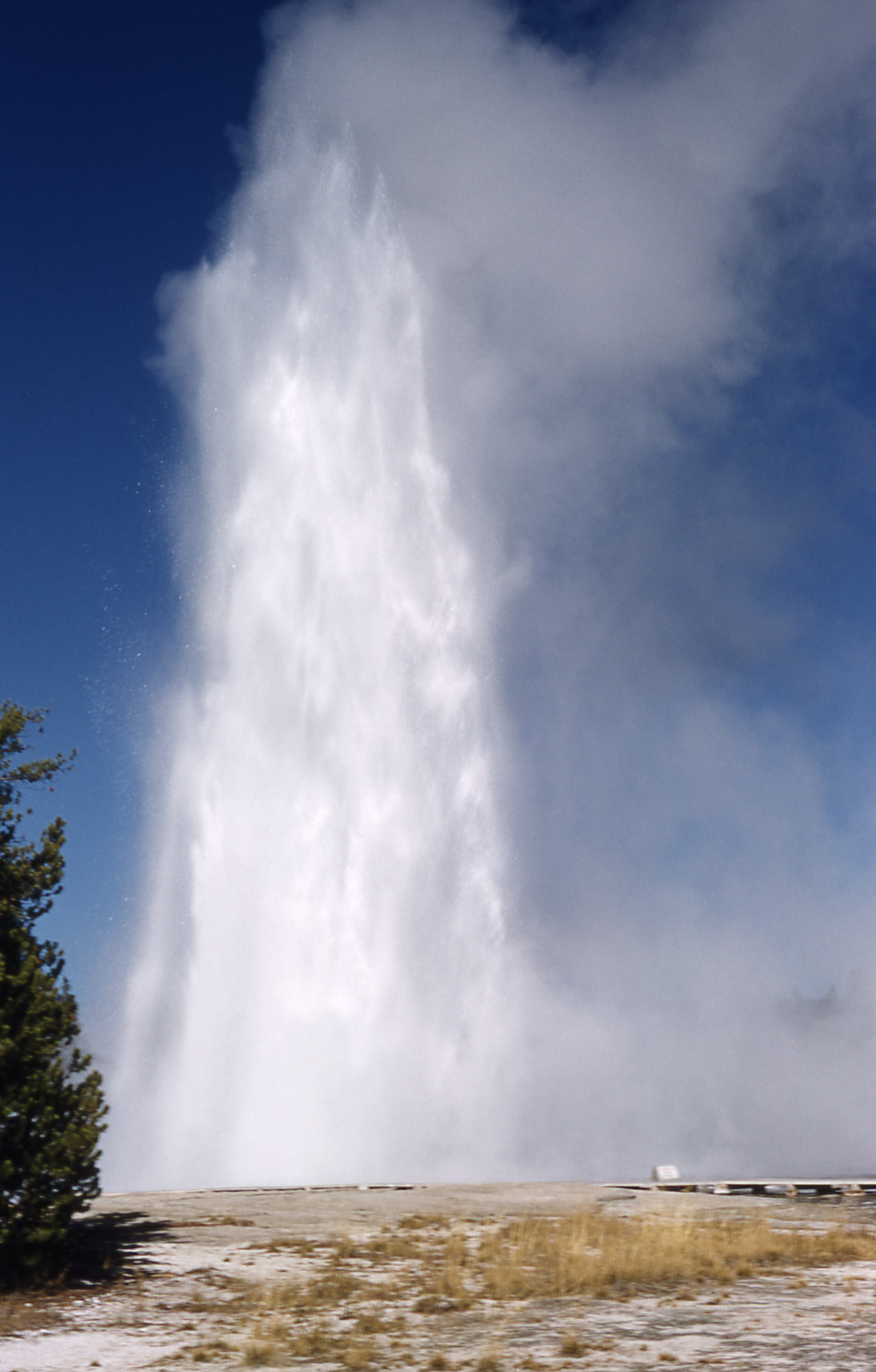
- Splendid Geyser during an eruption

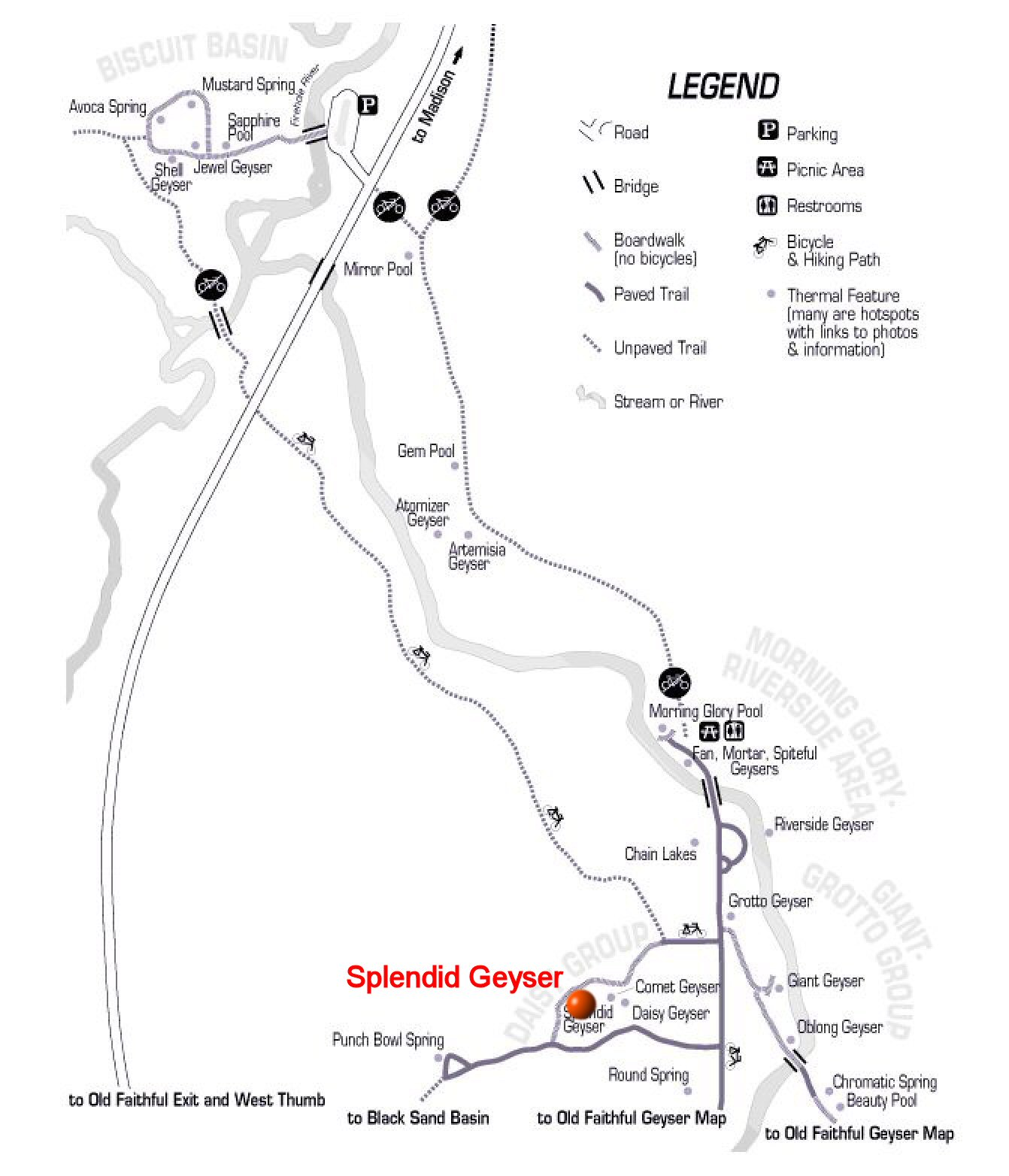
- Map of Upper Geyser Basin
- Location: Upper Geyser Basin, Yellowstone National Park, Teton County, Wyoming
- Coordinates: 44°28′13″N 110°50′41″W
- Type: Fountain geyser
- Eruption height: 200 ft (61 m)
- Frequency: 35 minutes to 20+ years
- Duration: 9 minutes+
- Temperature: 84 °C (183 °F)

Splendid Geyser is a geyser in the Upper Geyser Basin of Yellowstone National Park in the United States.

Splendid Geyser is part of the Daisy Group. Its eruptions are infrequent and unpredictable, unless it is active. When it does erupt, its fountain can reach a height of 200 feet (60 m). Eruptions are more likely if a storm front reduces barometric pressure and lowers the boiling point of water around the geyser. Splendid's eruptions are very rare with intervals between eruptions lasting decades. In the early to mid 1970s, the geyser was very active. Splendid came alive again in 1992. Splendid Geyser was last active in 1998. Eruptions last between 1 and 9 minutes.

Splendid Geyser is closely linked to Daisy Geyser. Most often, when Daisy is active, Splendid is inactive. In times when Daisy goes dormant, Splendid becomes very active. In rare occasions, both geysers will be active at the same time, leading to a "dual eruption". During a concert (dual) eruption Daisy and Splendid are both much stronger than usual. Then Splendid erupts to about 250 feet, The dual eruptions last from 30 to 120 minutes.

Splendid Geyser has not erupted since May 13, 1998.
