= Fountain Geyser =

Geyser in the Lower Geyser Basin of Yellowstone National Park

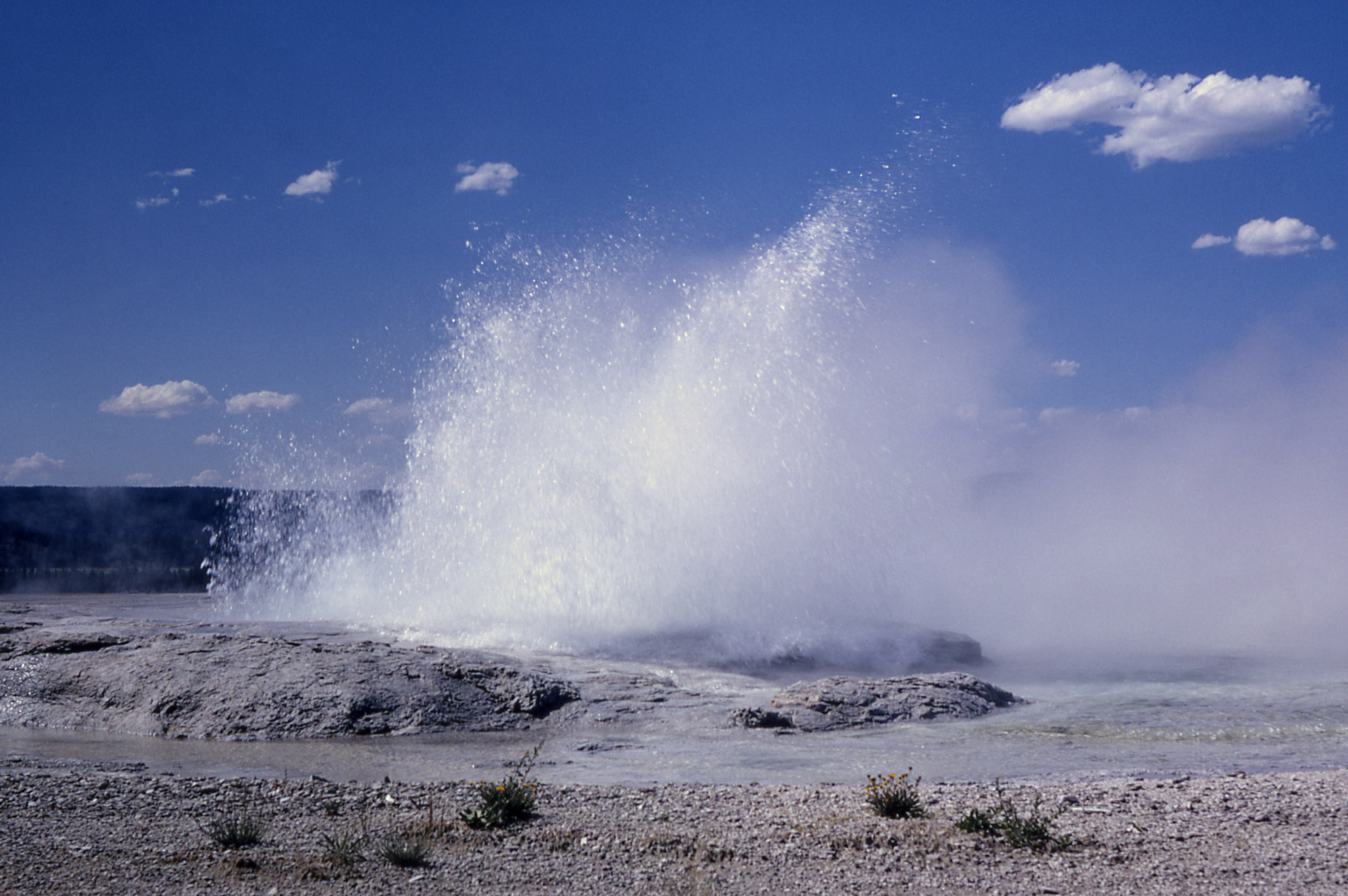
- Fountain Geyser
- Interactive map of Fountain Geyser
- Location: Lower Geyser Basin, Yellowstone National Park, Teton County, Wyoming
- Coordinates: 44°33′15″N 110°48′43″W
- Elevation: 7,254 feet (2,211 m)
- Type: Fountain geyser
- Eruption height: 75 feet (23 m)
- Frequency: 4-15 hours
- Duration: 30 minutes
- Temperature: 83.4 °C (182.1 °F)

Fountain Geyser is a geyser in the Lower Geyser Basin of Yellowstone National Park in the United States.

Fountain is the dominant member of a group of geysers at the Fountain Paint Pots thermal area. Morning Geyser, which erupts from a vent close to Fountain's, is larger, but is inactive during most years. Fountain, by contrast, is usually active. It is a fountain-type geyser that erupts jets ranging in height up to 80 feet (24 m) or more, with most eruptions containing at least a few bursts that reach 40 to 50 feet. Intervals (= eruption start to eruption start) vary from year to year but are commonly about 4.5 to 6 hours, with occasional longer intervals of 11 to 12 hours. Durations of eruptions are typically about 30 minutes. Occasionally, Fountain departs from its usual behavior and enters so-called "wild-phase" eruption, during which the height is much reduced but the duration can be as long as two weeks.

Fountain is not to be confused with similarly named, and nearby (and larger), Great Fountain Geyser, another of the major features of Lower Geyser Basin, adjacent to the Firehole Lake road.

Images of Fountain Geyser
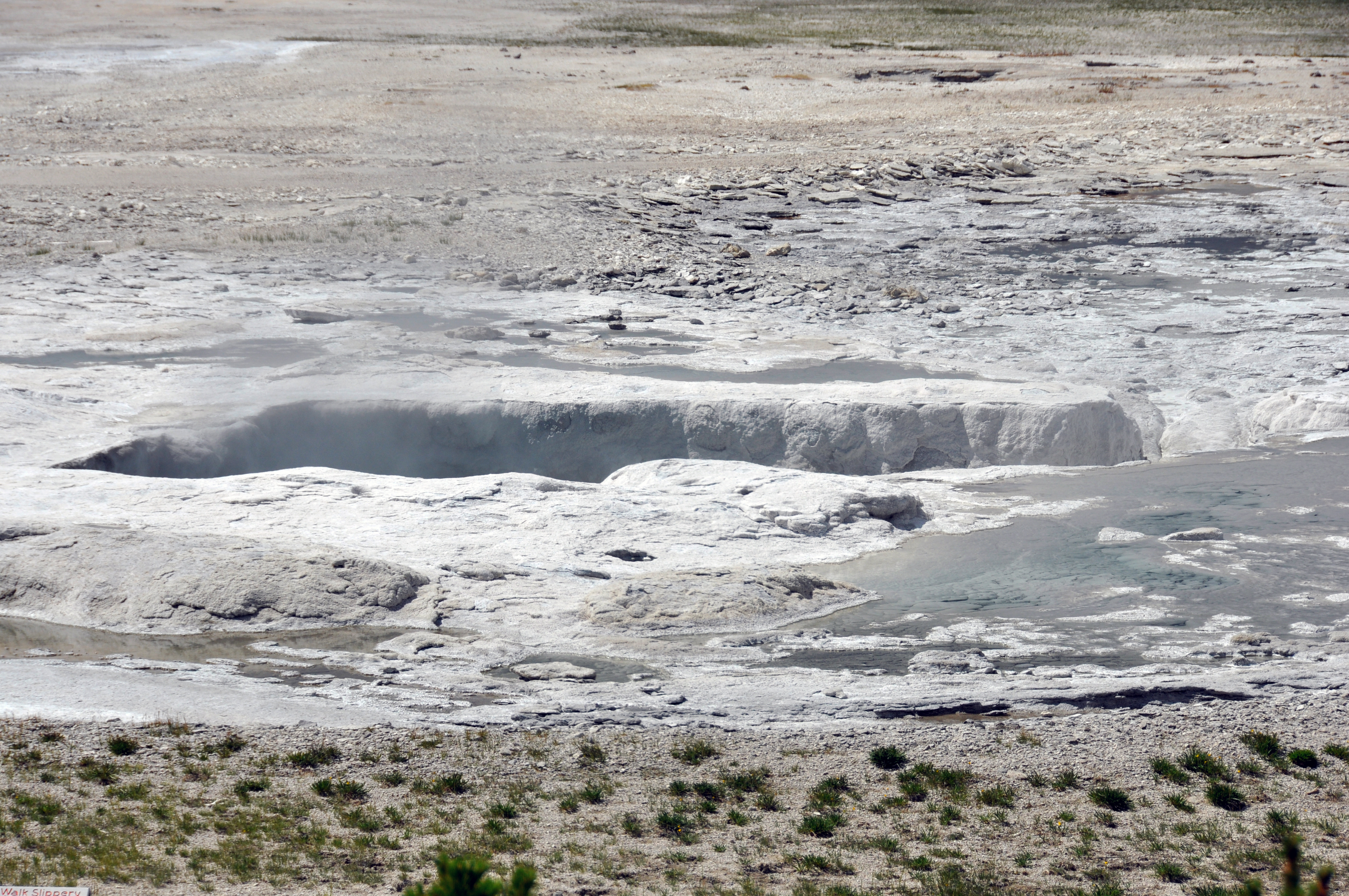
At rest, 2014

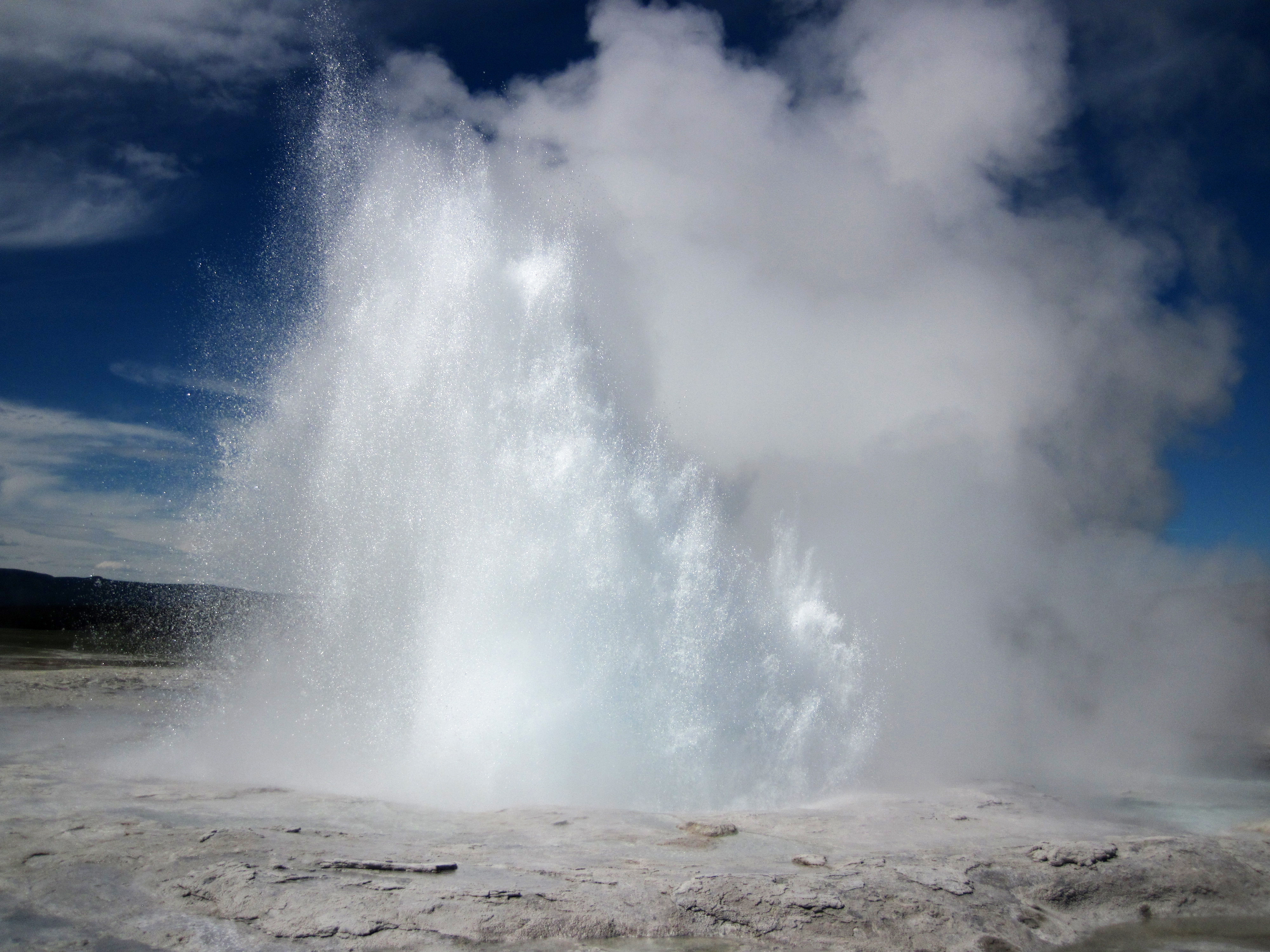
2017

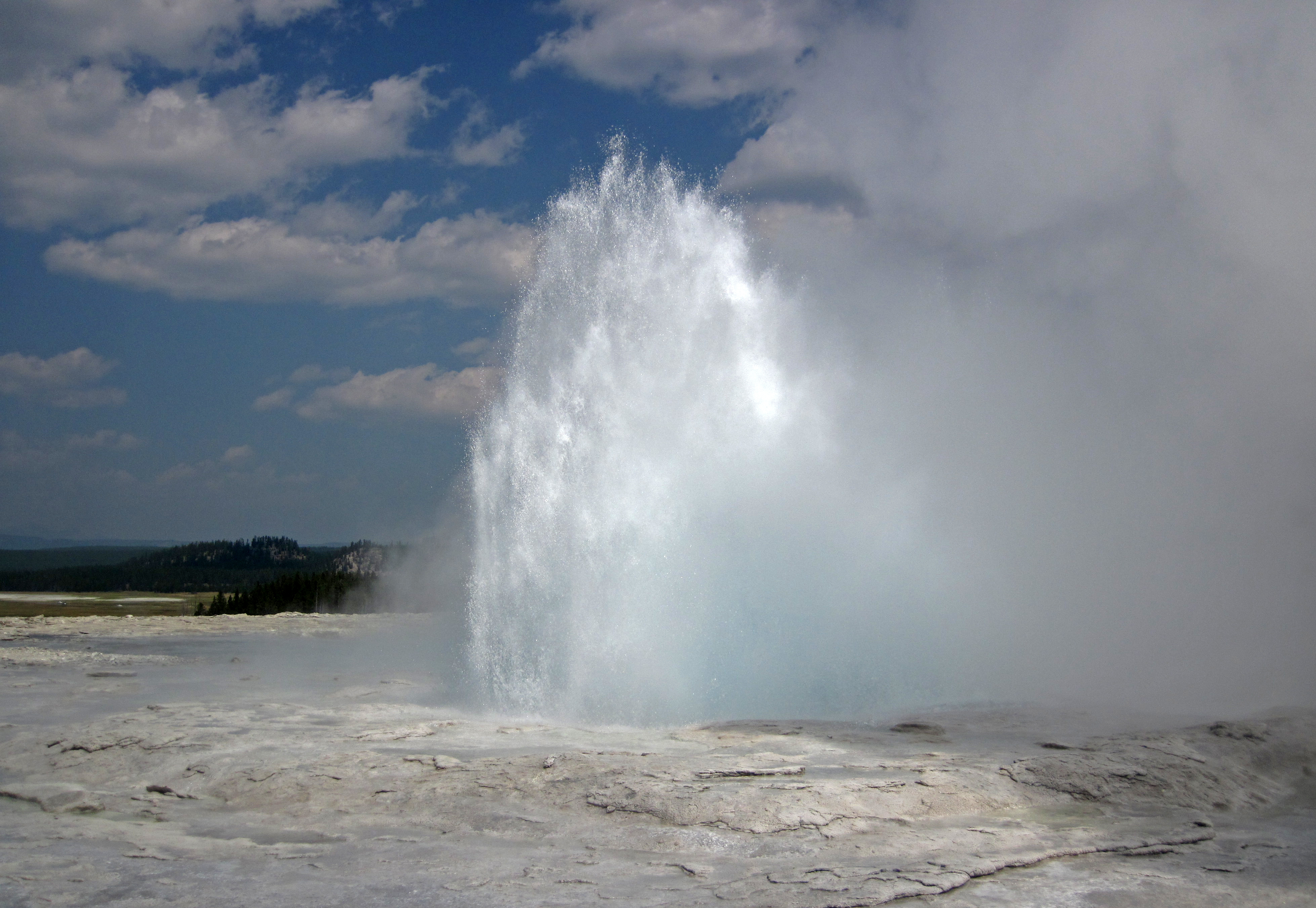
2017

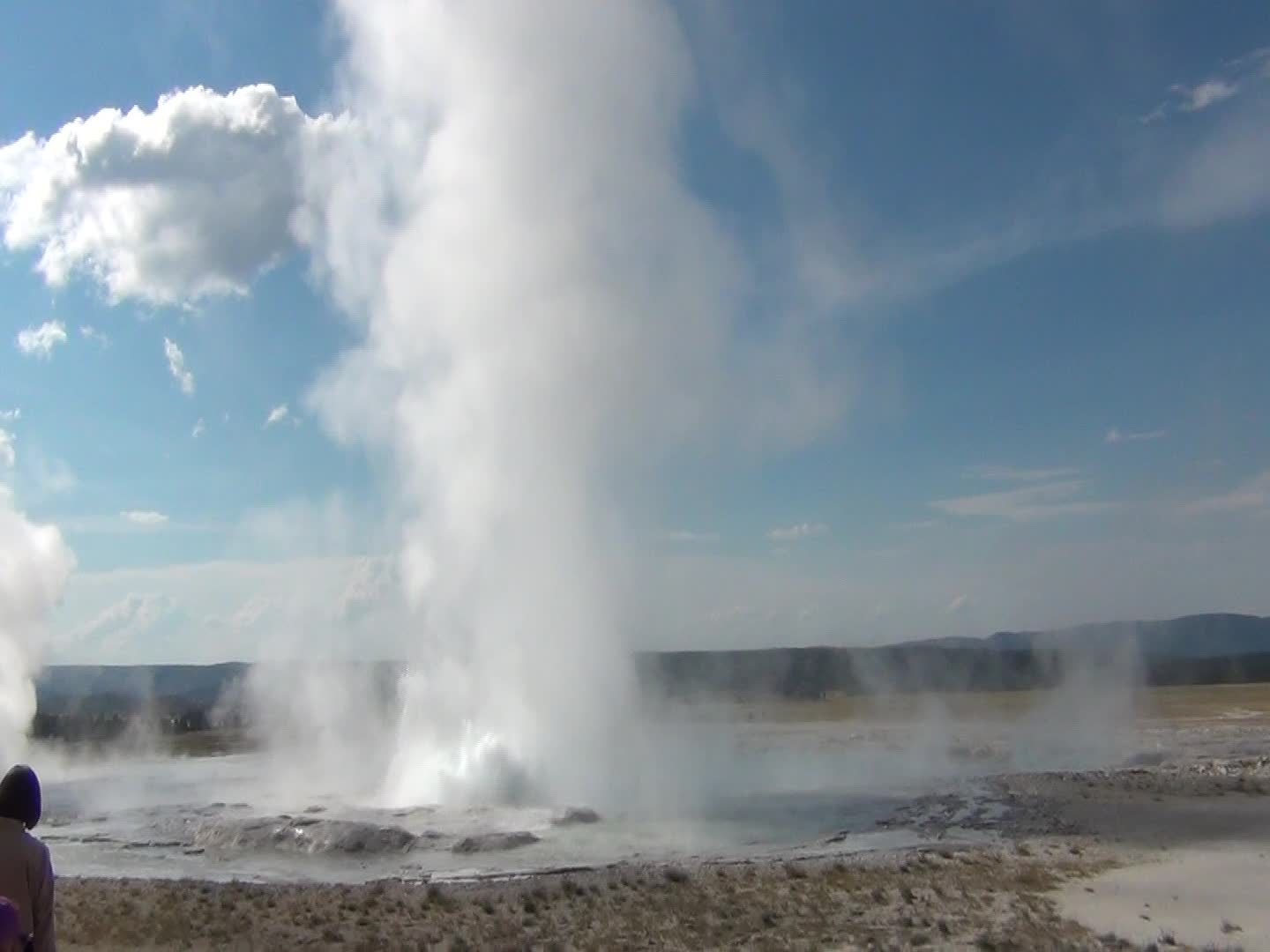
geyser and surrounding area, 2013
