= Penta Geyser =

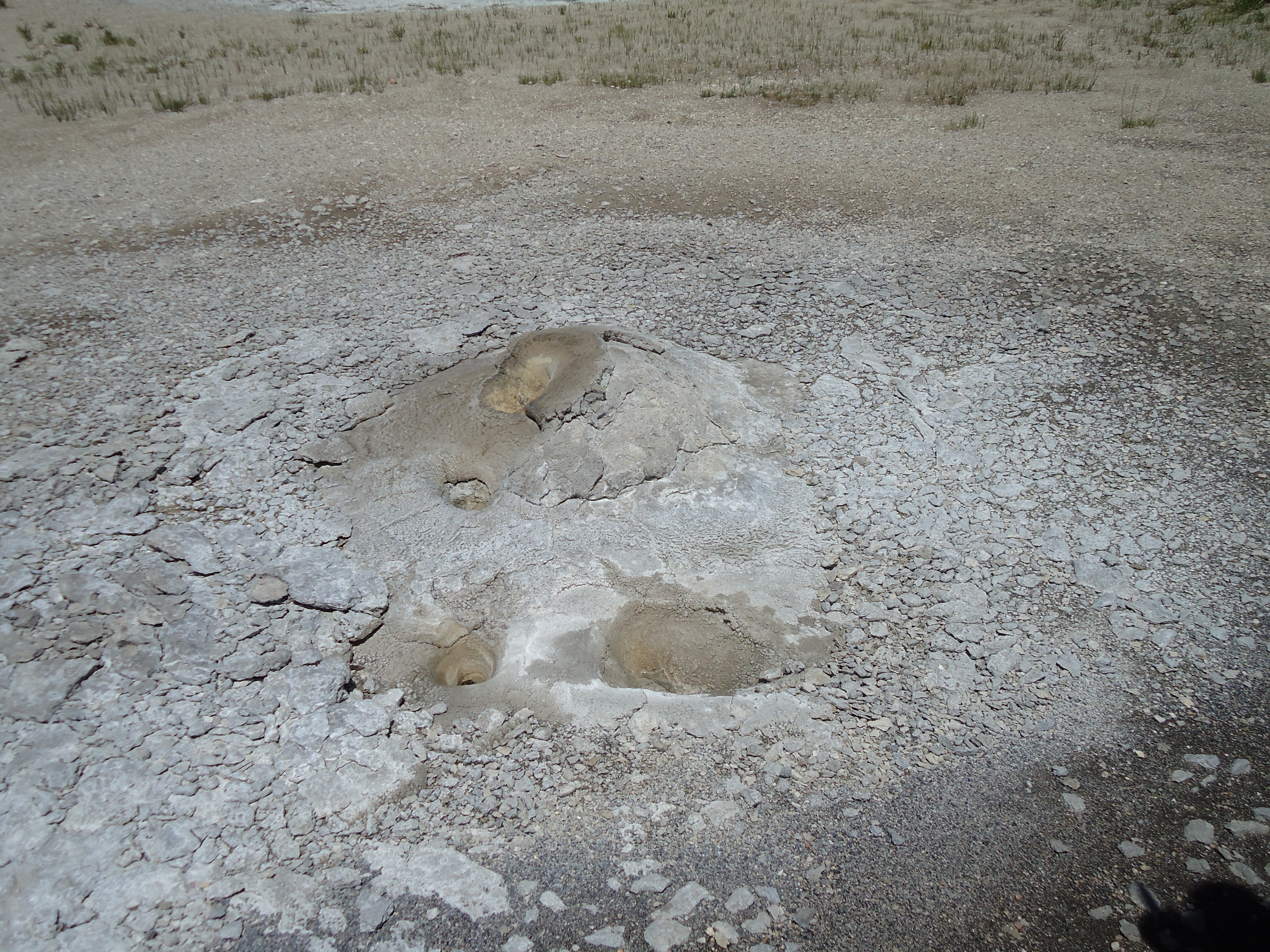
- Penta Geyser in Yellowstone, dry due to Sawmill's current eruption.
- Interactive map of Penta Geyser
- Name origin: the five vents that it erupts from
- Location: Upper Geyser Basin, Yellowstone National Park, Teton County, Wyoming
- Coordinates: 44°27′57″N 110°50′12″W
- Elevation: 7,336 feet (2,236 m)
- Type: Cone geyser
- Eruption height: up to 25 feet (7.6 m)
- Frequency: up to 2 times a day
- Duration: 30 minutes - 2 hours

Penta Geyser sits a few feet off the path adjacent to Spasmodic Geyser in the Upper Geyser Basin of Yellowstone National Park, Wyoming, United States.

Penta is located in the Sawmill Complex with geysers such as Sawmill Geyser, and Spasmodic Geyser. Penta Geyser has five vents, providing the basis of its name. Due to its location in the Sawmill Complex, Penta has a very close relation to the activity of Sawmill and the other geysers in the area. Penta's eruptions usually begin when the water levels in the complex are rising. This usually occurs after Spasmodic, and sometimes Tardy Geyser's eruptions begin. Before an eruption, water pools up near Penta. It can flow down toward Sawmill. Even very late in these stages, Sawmill can begin to erupt and cut off Penta, causing it to drain without an eruption. Penta Geyser usually erupts with Spasmodic, and ends a few minutes after Spasmodic stops. The eruptions are more common when the Sawmill Complex is in "Penta-Churn" mode.

Penta was known at one time as "the Handsaw."

== See also ==
- Sawmill Geyser
- Yellowstone National Park
- Geyser
