= Spasmodic Geyser =

Geyser in Yellowstone National Park, Wyoming

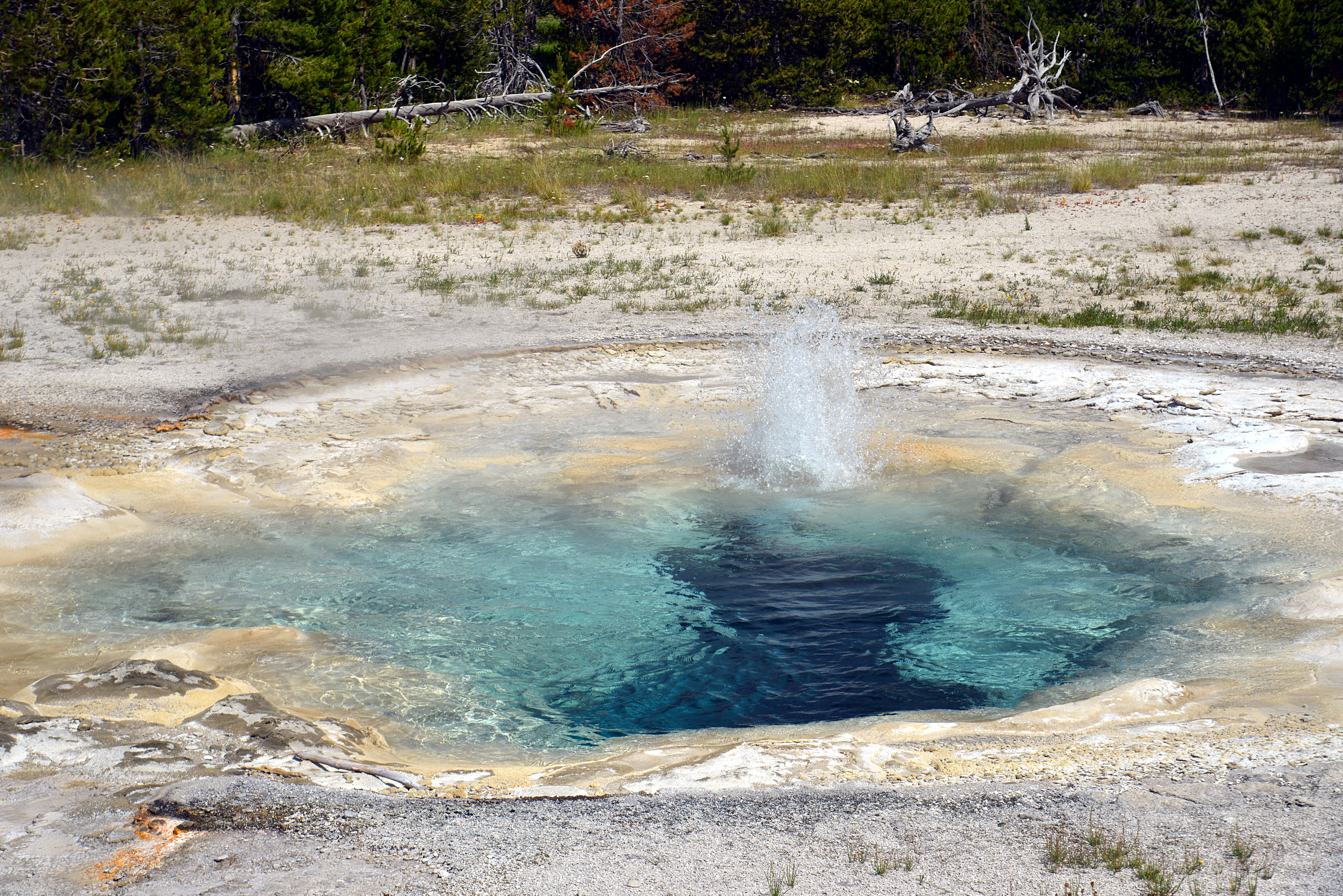
- East vent of Spasmodic geyser
- Interactive map of Spasmodic Geyser
- Name origin: Named by A. C. Peale, U.S. Geological Survey, 1878
- Location: Upper Geyser Basin, Yellowstone National Park, Teton County, Wyoming
- Coordinates: 44.46556°N 110.83528°W
- Elevation: 7,336 feet (2,236 m)
- Type: fountain geyser and cone geyser
- Eruption height: subterranean to 15 feet (4.6 m)
- Frequency: 1-3 hours
- Duration: minutes - hours
- Temperature: 92 °C (198 °F)

Spasmodic Geyser is a geyser located in the Upper Geyser Basin in Yellowstone National Park in the United States.

Spasmodic Geyser's eruptions from the two craters can be up to 15 feet (4.6 m) high. Water can also erupt from a few inches to ten feet high from the approximately 20 vents. The intervals between eruptions are irregular, but most are in the 1-3 hour range. Spasmodic Geyser was named by A.C. Peale, from the 1878 Hayden survey team, for its erratic eruptions. Its temperature is about 92 °C (198 °F). Spasmodic Geyser is also connected to the nearby Penta Geyser, which is smaller. While Penta Geyser is erupting, there is no activity from Spasmodic Geyser. Activity from Spasmodic Geyser usually precede eruptions from Sawmill Geyser and Penta Geyser.

== See also ==
- List of Yellowstone geothermal features
