= Sawmill Geyser =

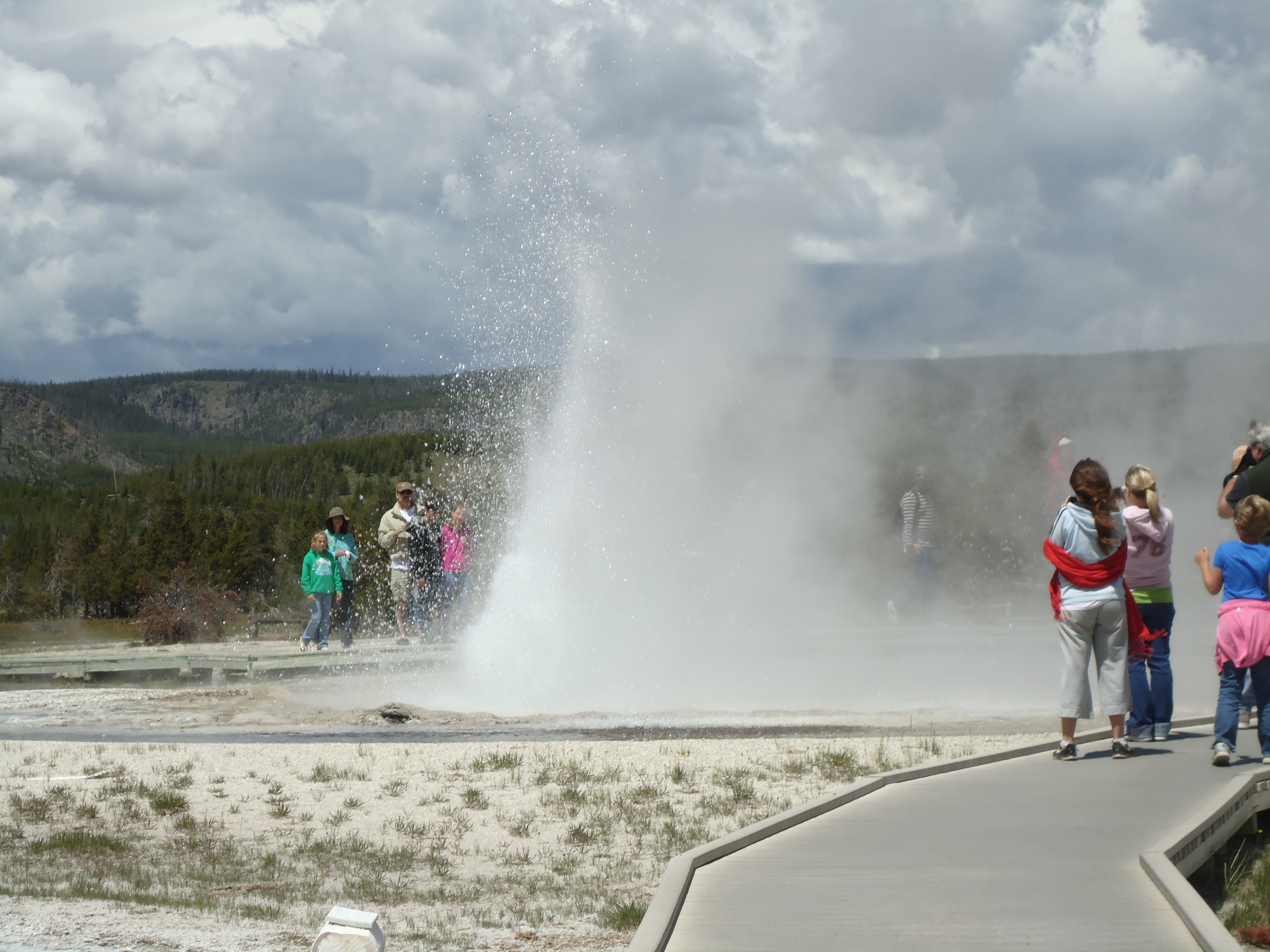
- Sawmill erupting

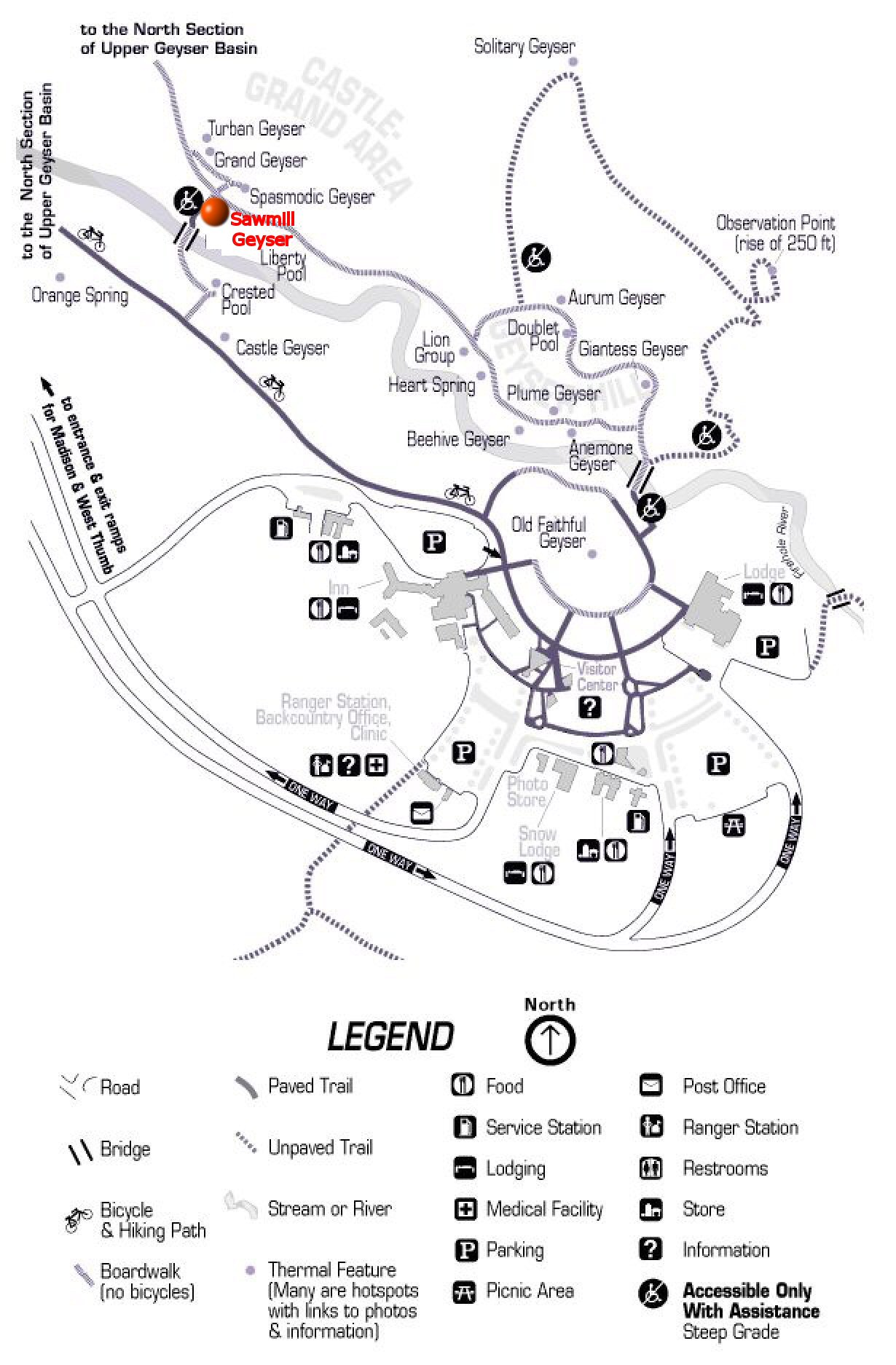
- Sawmill Geyser location in southern portion of Upper Geyser Basin.
- Name origin: Named by Antoine Schoenborn during the 1871 Hayden Survey
- Location: Upper Geyser Basin, Yellowstone National Park, Teton County, Wyoming
- Coordinates: 44°27′56″N 110°50′12″W
- Type: Fountain geyser
- Eruption height: up to 35 feet (11 m)
- Frequency: 1 - 3 hours
- Duration: 30 - 50 mins
- Temperature: 92 °C (198 °F)

Sawmill Geyser, named because water spins in its crater as it erupts looking somewhat like the rotating circular blade of a lumber mill, is a geyser in Yellowstone National Park, Wyoming, United States. The geyser was named by Antoine Schoenborn of the Hayden Geological Survey of 1871.

Sawmill is the largest geyser in the Sawmill Complex, a region of geothermal features located in Upper Geyser Basin approximately 10 feet off the path. The geyser has an irregular pattern of eruption due to the underground structural interconnectivity which is characteristic of geyser complexes. Despite this, it tends to have a delay around 1 to 3 hours between eruptions. Often, Sawmill will erupt after the nearby Spasmodic Geyser, but only if Penta Geyser, another significant geyser in the complex, does not erupt first. If Penta erupts before Sawmill, Sawmill is cut off from water, and cannot erupt until the basin is reloaded, indicated by an eruption by Spasmodic. Another eruption indicator is when Sawmill fills with the rest of the geyser's water in the Sawmill Complex or starts to overflow, bubbles tend to rise to the surface. This indicates that an eruption is near. Sawmill drains after its eruptions, and if it had a large eruption prior, unusual behavior can occur in other geysers in the area.

Sawmill was a frequent eruptor in recent years prior to January or February 2017, when it suddenly ceased eruptive activity for over four years. According to reports submitted to GeyserTimes.org, Sawmill's last observed eruption for over four years occurred during the morning hours of January 29, 2017. Sawmill Geyser resumed eruptive activity with an eruption at 2:00 AM on June 24, 2021.

== Gallery ==
Images of Sawmill Geyser
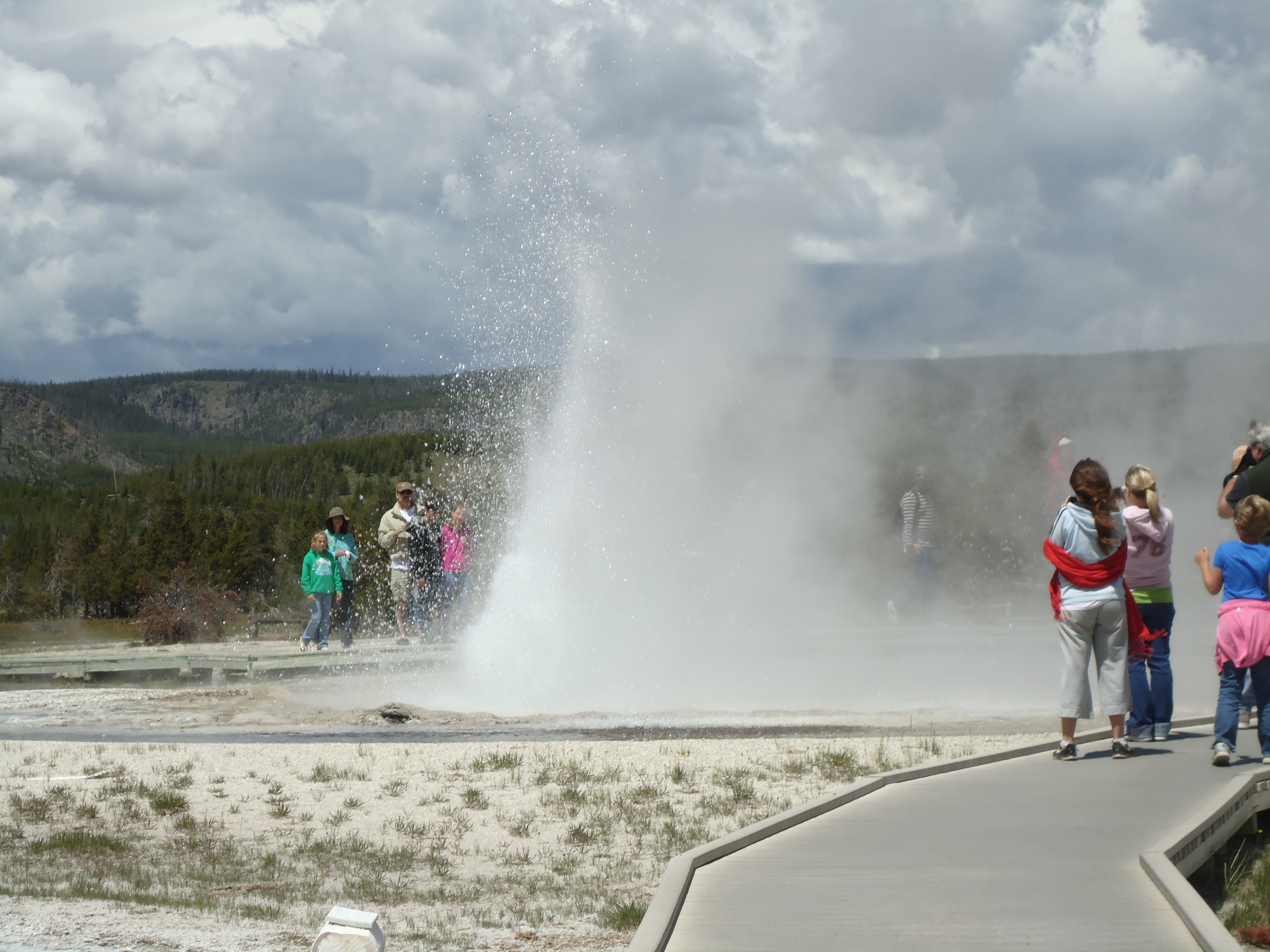
Approaching Sawmill - July 5, 2010

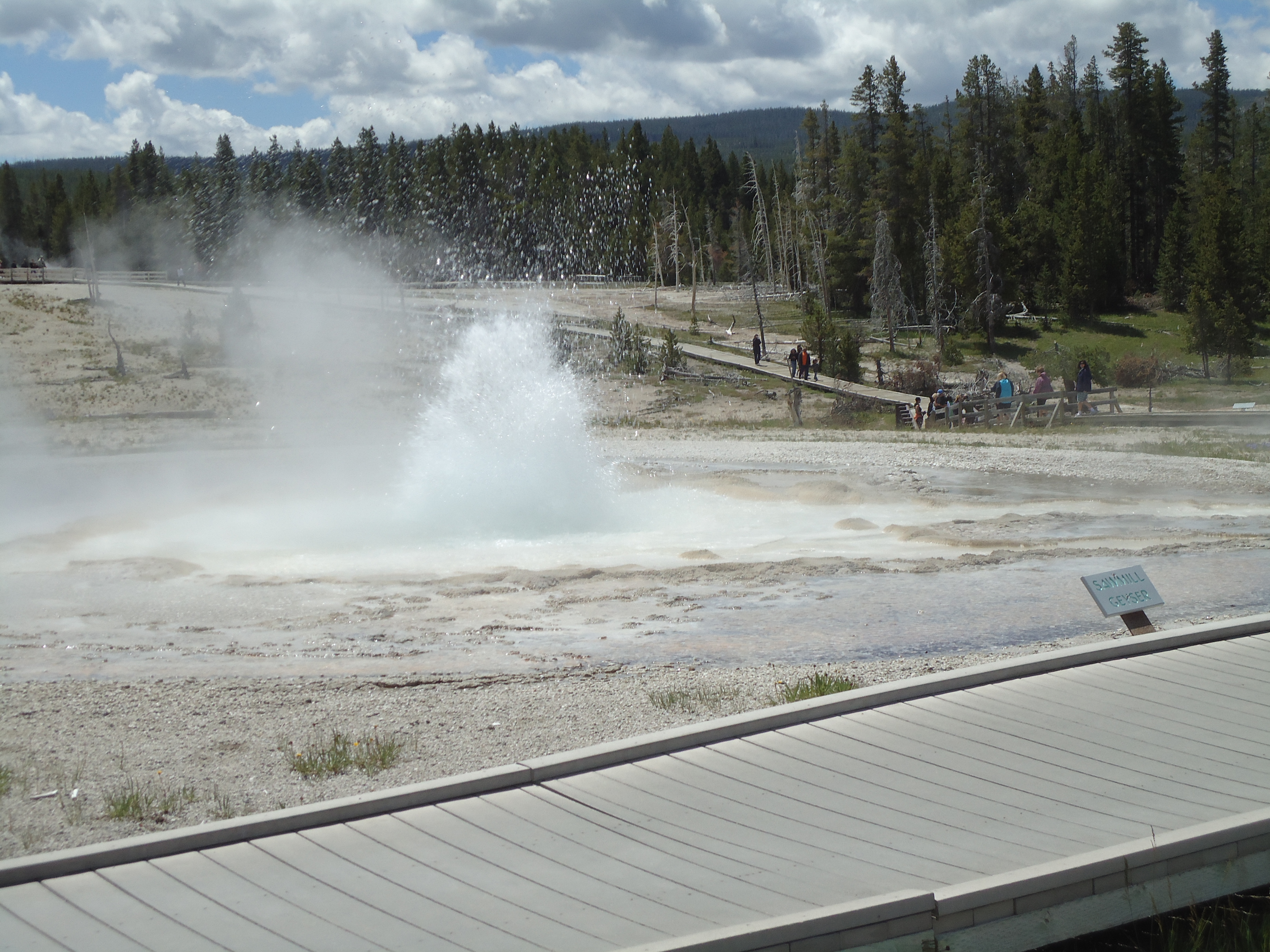
Near Sawmill - July 5, 2010

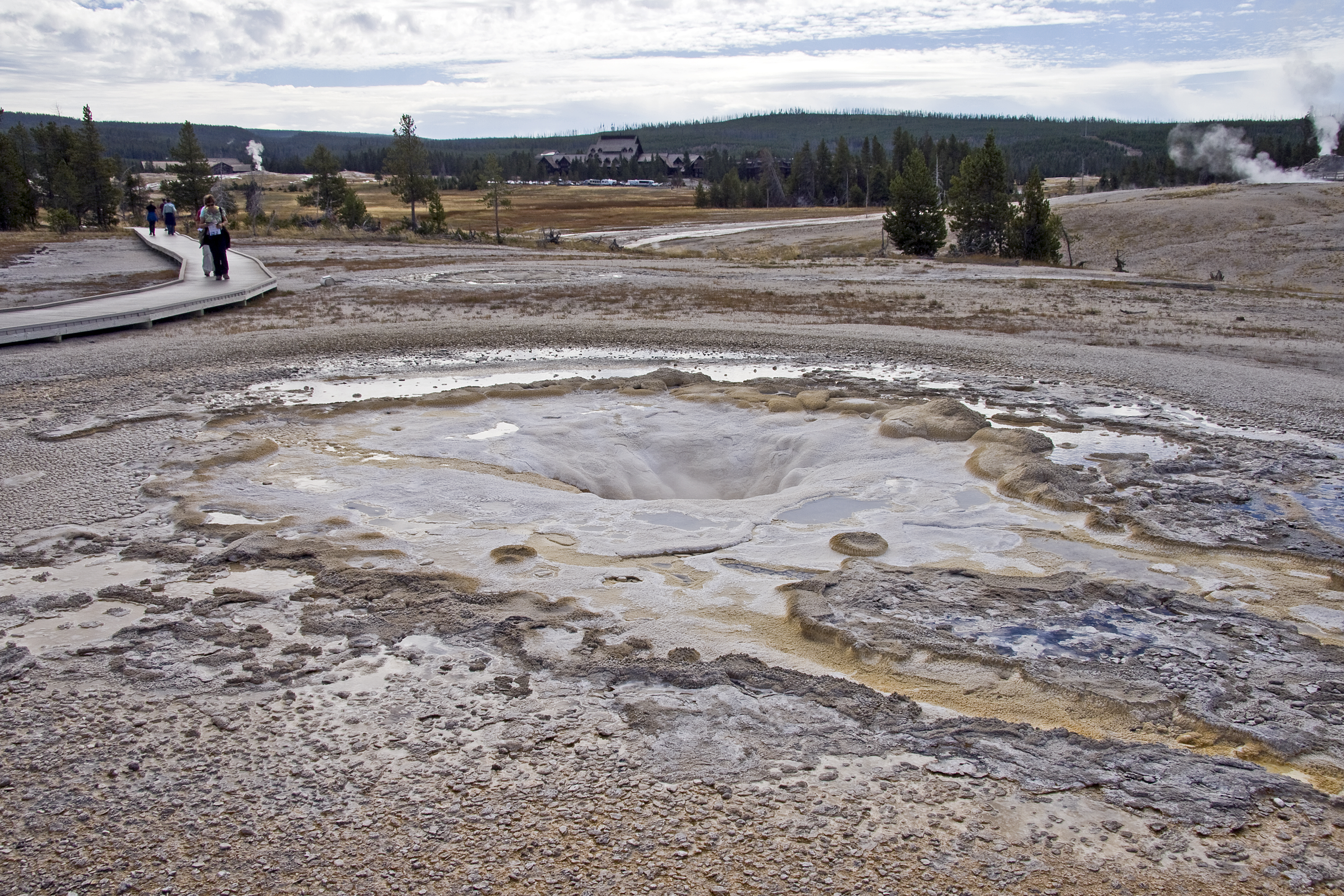
Sawmill Geyser spout - September 17, 2010

== See also ==
- List of Yellowstone geothermal features
- Spasmodic Geyser
- Geyser
- Hot springs
