= Angling in Yellowstone National Park =

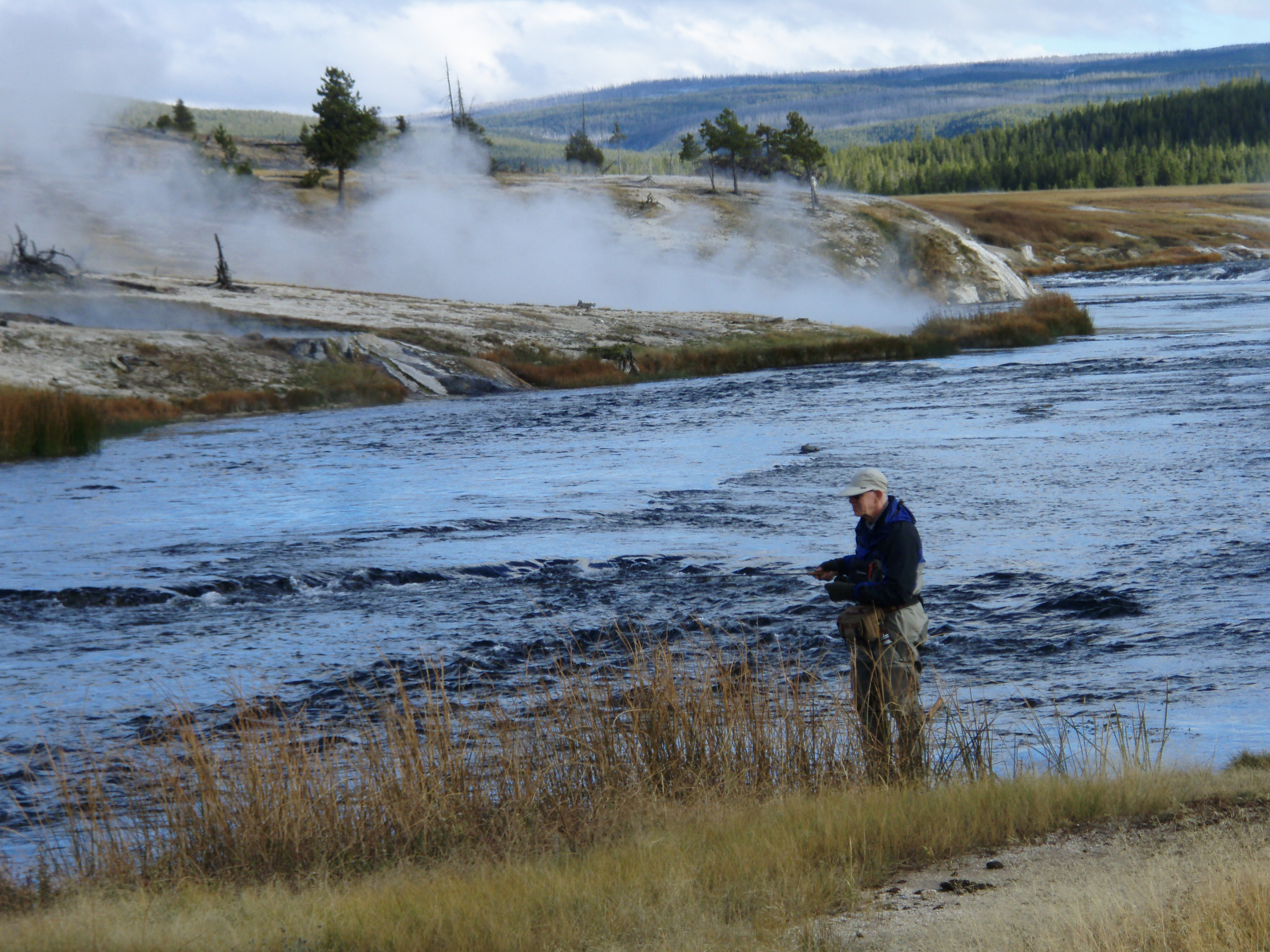
Fly fishing in the Firehole River

Angling in Yellowstone National Park is a major reason many visitors come to the park each year and since it was created in 1872, the park has drawn anglers from around the world to fish its waters. In 2006, over 50,000 park fishing permits were issued to visitors. The park contains hundreds of miles of accessible, high-quality trout rivers containing wild trout populations—over 200 creeks, streams and rivers are fishable. There are 45 fishable lakes and several large lakes are easily accessible to visitors. Additionally, the park's remote sections provide anglers ample opportunity to visit rivers, streams, creeks and lakes that receive little angling pressure. With the exception of one specially designated drainage, all the park's waters are restricted to artificial lures and fly fishing. The Madison, Firehole and a section of the Gibbon rivers are restricted to fly fishing only.

Anglers visiting the park to fish will encounter westslope cutthroat, Yellowstone cutthroat, rainbow, brown, brook and lake trout, mountain whitefish and Arctic grayling. The park's fishing season runs from the Saturday in May associated with Memorial Day to October 31st each year. The National Park Service regulates angling in the park and classifies different fish available to the angler as either native or non-native species. Any native species—cutthroat trout, grayling and whitefish—caught must be immediately released unharmed. Non-natives—rainbow, brown, brook and lake trout—have different bag limits depending on the waters fished. Some non-natives are also subject to catch and release regulations and all lake trout caught in Yellowstone Lake or river must be killed. All hooks used in the park must be barbless or have their barbs pinched down. Many specific waters or sections of waters are closed either permanently for either safety reasons, wildlife management or to protect thermal features. The National Park Service may also enact emergency closures and restrictions because of low water, high temperatures or fires.

Anglers should always be familiar with the most current regulations, restrictions and closures. A Yellowstone National Park fishing permit is required to fish in the park. State licenses are not required.

Angling supplies are available in the park's concession stores and in the towns associated with major entrances to the park—West Yellowstone, Montana; Gardiner, Montana; Jackson, Wyoming; Cody, Wyoming and Cooke City, Montana

== History ==
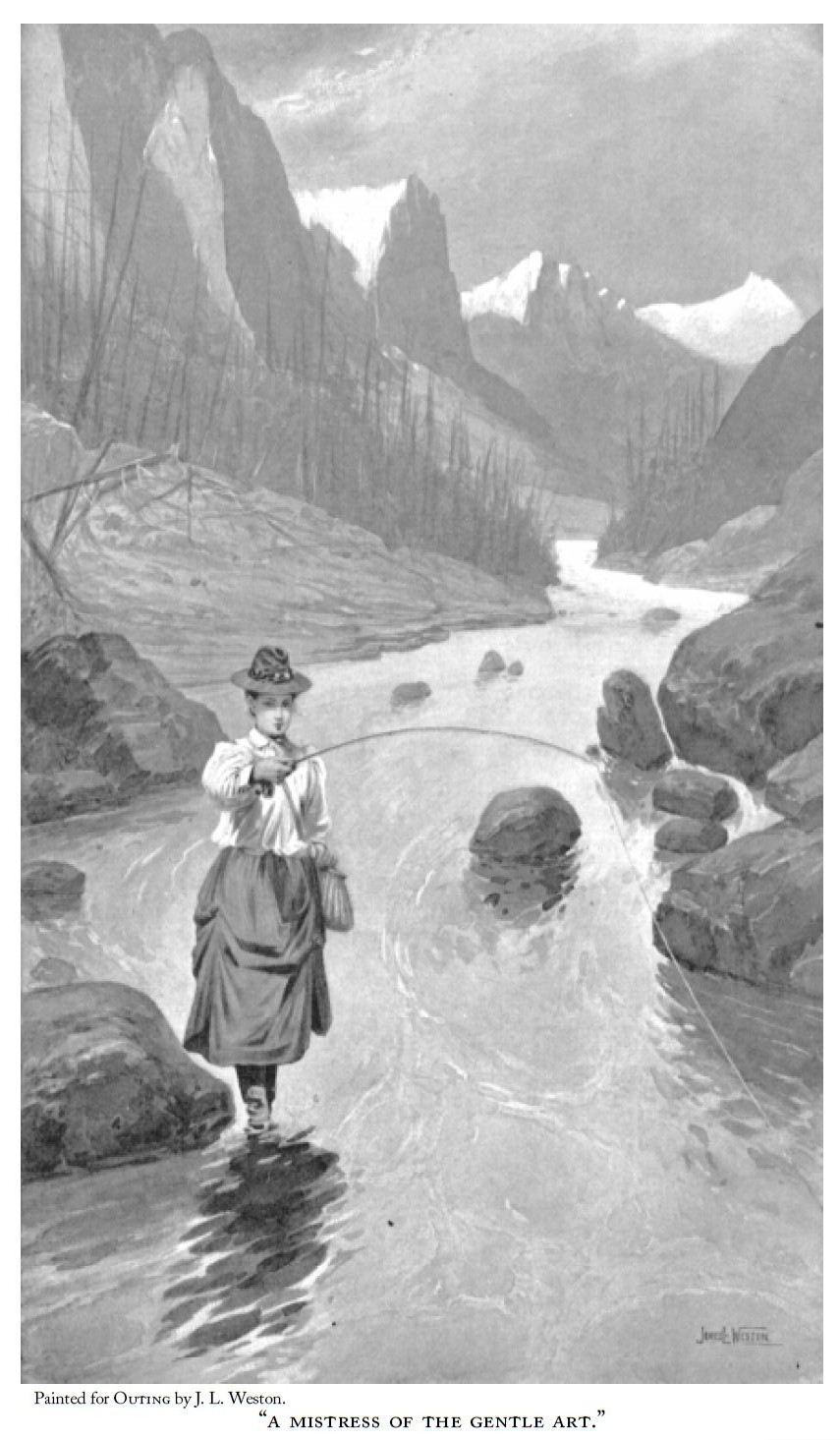
A Mistress of the Gentle Art from A Woman's Trout Fishing in Yellowstone Park, 1897

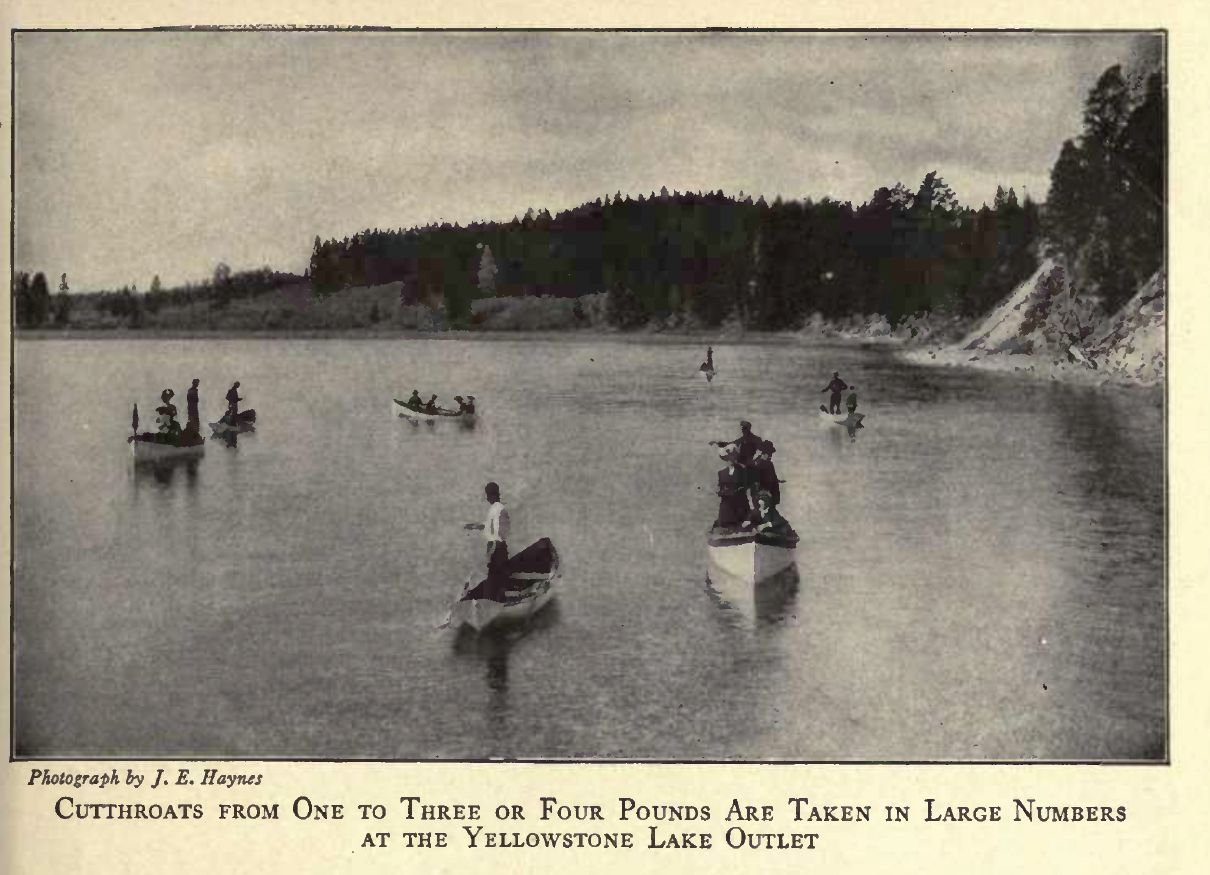
Cutthroat trout fishing at the outlet of Yellowstone Lake circa 1916

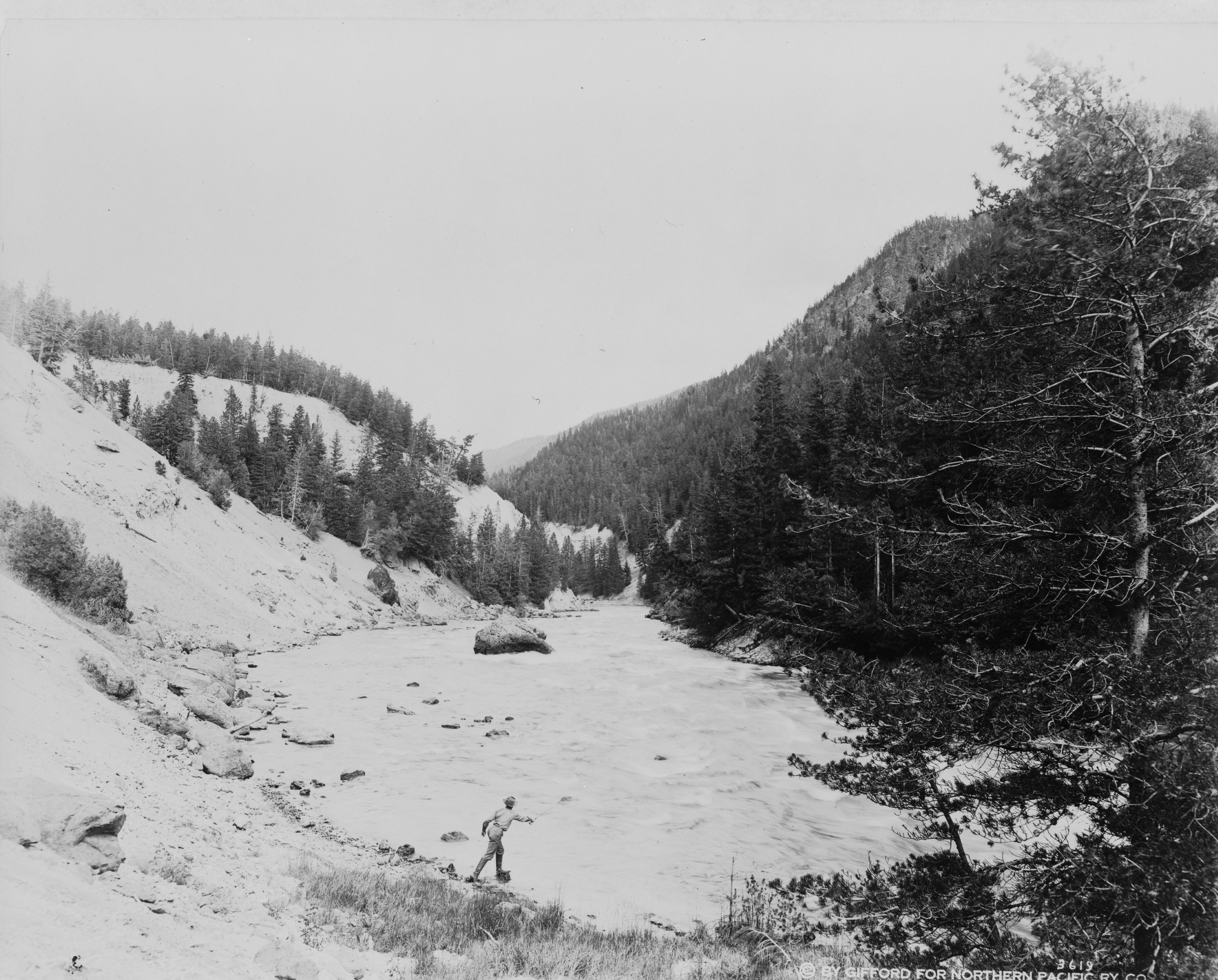
Man fishing in the Yellowstone River, 1909

The original expeditions that explored the regions that ultimately became Yellowstone National Park in 1872 caught fish in many of its waters to supply themselves with fresh provisions. It wasn't long after the creation of the park, that park officials understood the importance of angling to visitors and the importance of creating a ready resource to supply hotels and camps within the park with fresh fish. This resulted in the first government stocking of native and non-native species in 1889 and continued with a variety of successful and unsuccessful stocking efforts until 1955 when all stocking programs in the park were discontinued. Today's park trout are completely wild populations. Many of the park's waters held no fish prior to government stocking operations which introduced mainly non-native species to the rivers and lakes and redistributed native species. In fact, with the exception of the upper Yellowstone River drainage, all the lakes and streams above major waterfalls were devoid of game fish prior to government stocking operations.

Trout have been planted in nearly all streams in the park except those that are tributary to Yellowstone River, and the experiment has been so successful that there are now but few places in this country where better sport can be had by the fisherman...In order that it may never be necessary to make any restrictions it is strongly urged that a small fish hatchery be established here. If this can be done the streams can be kept so full of trout that it will be impossible for the tourists to deplete them.

— Captain John Pitcher, Acting Superintendent, 1901,

Probably the most dramatic example of this is the Firehole River above Firehole Falls. When the Washburn-Langford-Doane Expedition camped on the shores of the upper Firehole in the fall of 1870, the river was barren of trout. The same was true of the Gibbon River and Gibbon Falls. Today, the upper Firehole is one of the premier angling destinations in North America. One of the earliest accounts of trout fishing in the park is from Mary Trowbridge Townsend's 1897 article in Outing Magazine A Woman's Trout Fishing in Yellowstone Park in which she talks about catching the Von Behr trout in the Fire Hole [sic] river.

Long dashes down stream taxed my unsteady footing; the sharp click and whirr of the reel resounded in desperate efforts to hold him somewhat in check; another headlong dash, then a vicious bulldog shake of the head as he sawed back and forth across the rocks. Every wile inherited from generations of wily ancestors was tried until, in a moment of exhaustion, the net was slipped under him. Wading ashore with my prize, I had barely time to notice his size—a good four-pounder, and unusual markings, large yellow spots encircled by black, with great brilliancy of iridescent color—when back he flopped into the water and was gone. However, I took afterward several of the same variety, known in the Park as the Von Baer [sic] trout, and which I have since found to be the Salmo fario, the veritable trout of Izaak Walton

— Mary Towbridge Townsend, 1897, Outing Magazine, .

In the early days of government stocking operations, all types of attempts were made to introduce desirable species for the angler. In the case of Yellowstone, both landlocked Atlantic salmon and largemouth bass were introduced but never established themselves in the park. Yellow perch were inadvertently introduced, established themselves in a few lakes, and were later poisoned out. By the early 20th century, a number of hatcheries were established in the park by the U.S. Bureau of Fisheries. These hatcheries not only produced stocks for the park, but also took advantage of the great spawning stock of cutthroat trout to supply eggs to hatcheries around the U.S. Between 1901 and 1953, 818 million trout eggs were exported from the park to hatcheries throughout the U.S.

The hatcheries and stocking operations had both positive and negative impacts on the quality of angling in Yellowstone National Park in the first half of the 20th century. Many native populations were displaced by non-natives, but there was quality brown and rainbow trout fishing in the Firehole, Madison and Gibbon river drainages. Stocking and hatchery operations had had an overall negative impact on the Yellowstone cutthroat and Westslope cutthroat populations and in 1953 the National Park Service began closing the hatcheries and stopping stocking operations. The last fish stocked for the benefit of anglers was in 1955 after some 310 million fish had been released in park waters since 1889.

The regulation of anglers in the park also evolved significantly since the park's creation. Original angling was a subsistence affair to fill a camp's larder and feed visitors to the park. Although fishing methods were limited to hook and line early in the park's history, there were no limits. In the 1920s, a daily limit of 20 fish was set. This was reduced to 10, then five and then three in 1954. Limits have fluctuated based on waters and species ever since then. Until 1969, bait could be used in most waters. In 1950, the Madison and Firehole rivers were designated as "Fly Fishing Only". The lower Gibbon River was given that designation in 1968. In 1970, regulation turned to minimum size limits for cutthroat trout and there began an era where the emphasis of regulation became the protection of native species. Angling permits were free in the park until 1994, when a $10 fee was charged for a seven-day permit. In 2013, the National Park Service began allowing unlimited taking of non-native species in some waters and required mandatory killing of rainbow and brook trout caught in the Lamar River drainage to protect native cutthroat trout.

=== Outfitters and writers ===
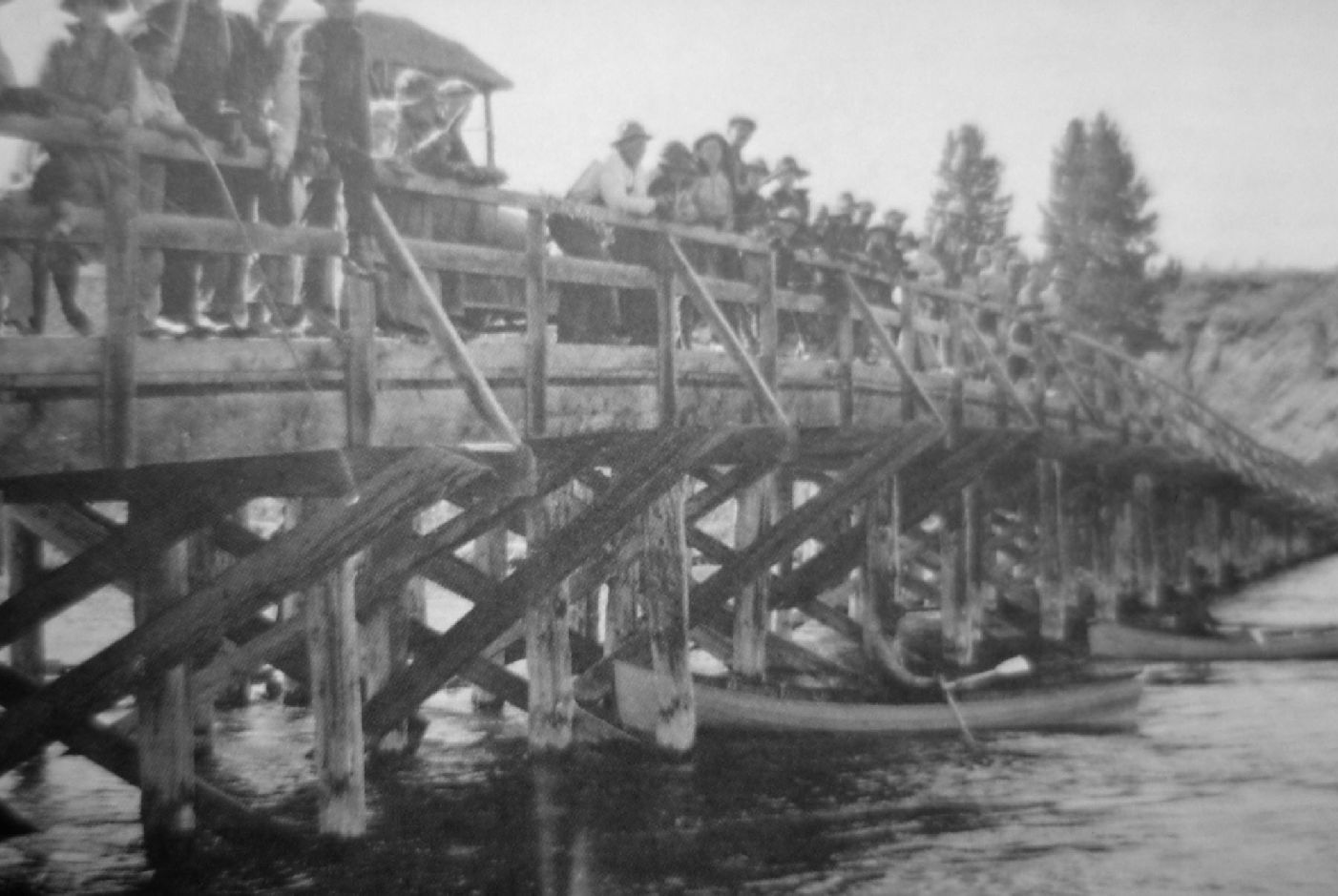
Original Fishing Bridge at the Yellowstone Lake outlet. Built in 1901

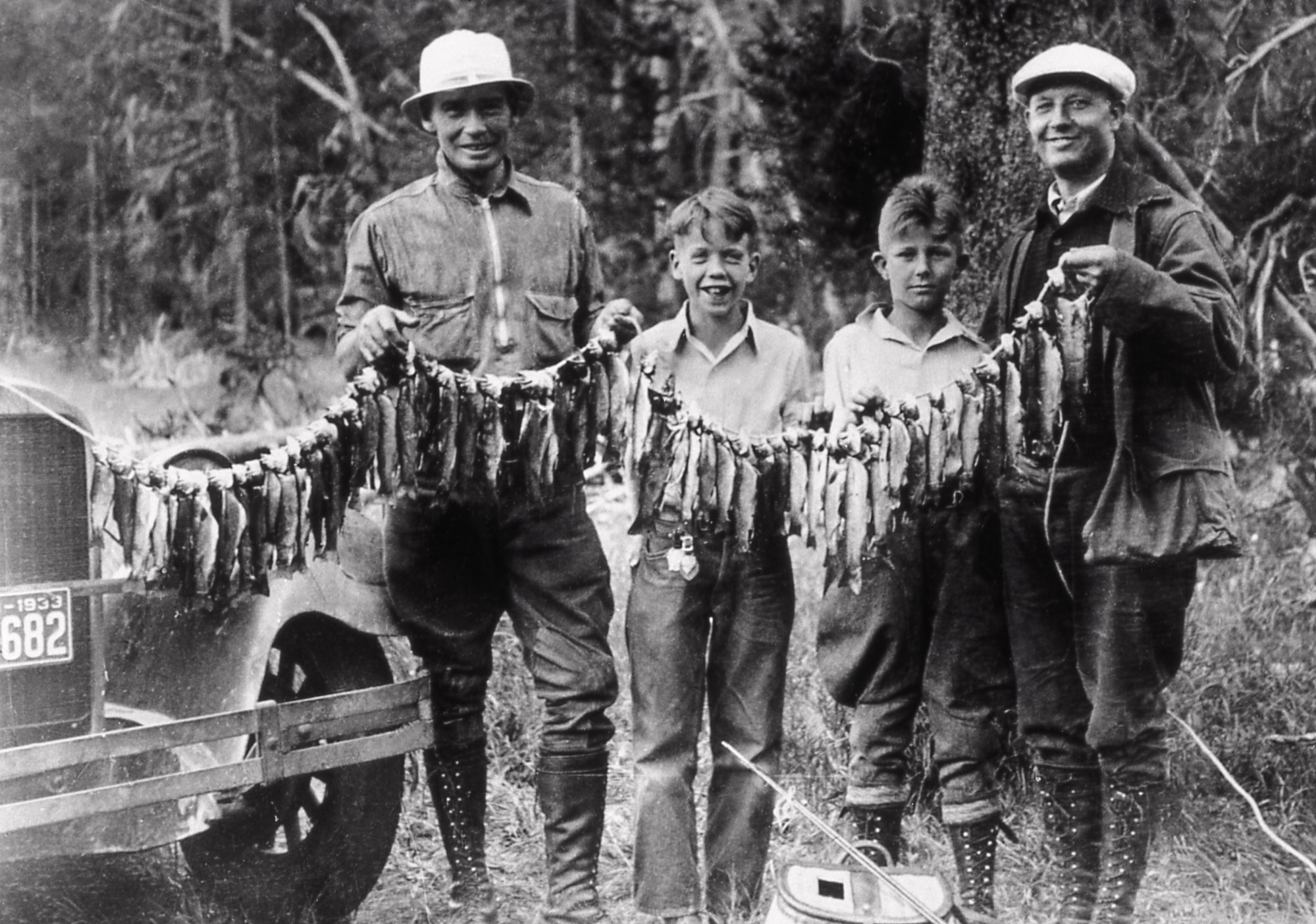
Typical Yellowstone fish catch (1923)

Yellowstone National Park and its rivers and lakes have always been a mecca for serious fishermen, especially fly fishermen. The literature and popular press of the sport has extensive references to fishing adventures in park waters. Many of the serious writers in the sport used park waters to test, prove and write about new techniques, equipment and fly patterns. The great angling in the park spawned outfitters in the towns outside the park such as West Yellowstone, Livingston, Gardiner and Jackson.

In 1936 and 1937, a British businessman and fly fisherman who emigrated to New York in 1930 by the name of Howard Back visited the park and compiled the first real assessment of the various waters and what the fly fisherman could expect from them. In his The Waters of the Yellowstone with Rod and Fly (1938), Back described his fishing experiences on what he called the Four Rivers which include the Madison, Firehole and Gibbon rivers, as well as the Yellowstone River. Prior to Back's work, the only available serious reference for anglers was a 1921 Bureau of Fisheries publication entitled The Fishes of the Yellowstone National Park—With Description of Park Waters and Notes on Fishing, a publication that Back encouraged all prospective anglers visiting Yellowstone to read, In 1938, at the same time Back was publishing his work, Dan Bailey, another eastern angler was opening Dan Bailey's fly shop in Livingston, Montana 55 miles (89 km) north of the Gardiner park entrance. Although Dan Bailey guided and serviced fly fisherman throughout South Central Montana, much of his business was guiding and outfitting fishermen in Yellowstone National Park. Dan Bailey's Fly Shop is still in business today servicing anglers visiting Yellowstone.

Although West Yellowstone had become the major tourist entrance to the park since the Oregon Short Line began operations in 1907, the establishment of serious fly fishing outfitters in West Yellowstone didn't occur until the mid-1930s when Don Martinez, the fly tier who popularized the Woolly Worm, opened a seasonal, one-room fly shop. In 1947, a fly fisherman and tier who worked for Martinez, Pat Barnes, opened a full-time fly shop, which today is Bob Jacklin's Fly Shop on the corner of Yellowstone and Canyon streets. The real landmark came in 1952 when a young man from Manhattan, Montana by the name of Bud Lilly opened Bud Lilly's Trout Shop on the corner of Madison and Canyon Streets (formerly Don Martinez's Tackle Shop). Lilly guided anglers, taught fly casting and outfitted anglers in Yellowstone for 35 years and did more than anyone else in the 1950–70s to promote fly fishing and fisheries conservation in Yellowstone throughout North America. Many of the great post-WWII era anglers first came to Yellowstone and the West because of Bud Lilly's Trout Shop and his writings.

Gardiner, Montana, although not the size or draw of West Yellowstone, got its own local fly fishing shop in 1953 when Merton J. Parks opened Parks' Fly Shop. Still operating today and run by his son, Richard Parks, Parks' Fly Shop and its guides have contributed significantly to the angling history of the park with the publication of Fishing Yellowstone National Park—An Angler's Complete Guide to More than 100 streams, rivers and lakes (1998).

Many well-known angling authors have written about their experiences in Yellowstone National Park. Howard Back was the first, but many influential anglers used Yellowstone as a backdrop for their angling stories, adventures and technical work.

Ray Bergman, the angling editor of Outdoor Life magazine, was a fan of the Firehole River and gave it many pages of coverage in his work Trout (1938, 1952). Here's a typical passage describing his fishing experiences in the Midway Geyser Basin section of the Firehole:

...Then came an experience that was new to me. By this time I had reached within casting distance of a sizable boiling spring and could see its waters mingling with those of the stream. Close to the wrinkle caused by the meeting of the hot spring and the cold water I saw a trout rise. It was only a dimple, but from the suction I thought it was a good fish. Conditions couldn't have been better for the float of the fly. When the little Royal dropped to the water it drifted along in a lifelike manner until it reached the place where I had seen the dimple, and then it disappeared. I raised the rod and was fast to what felt like the best fish of the day. Vint came along just as the hook went home, and some minutes later I had the satisfaction of having him take my picture as I held up the seventeen-incher with white steam of the boiling spring for a background. It wasn't the best fish of the day, but it was the first time I had ever taken a trout where I could have boiled it within a few feet.

— Ray Bergman, Trout, 1952

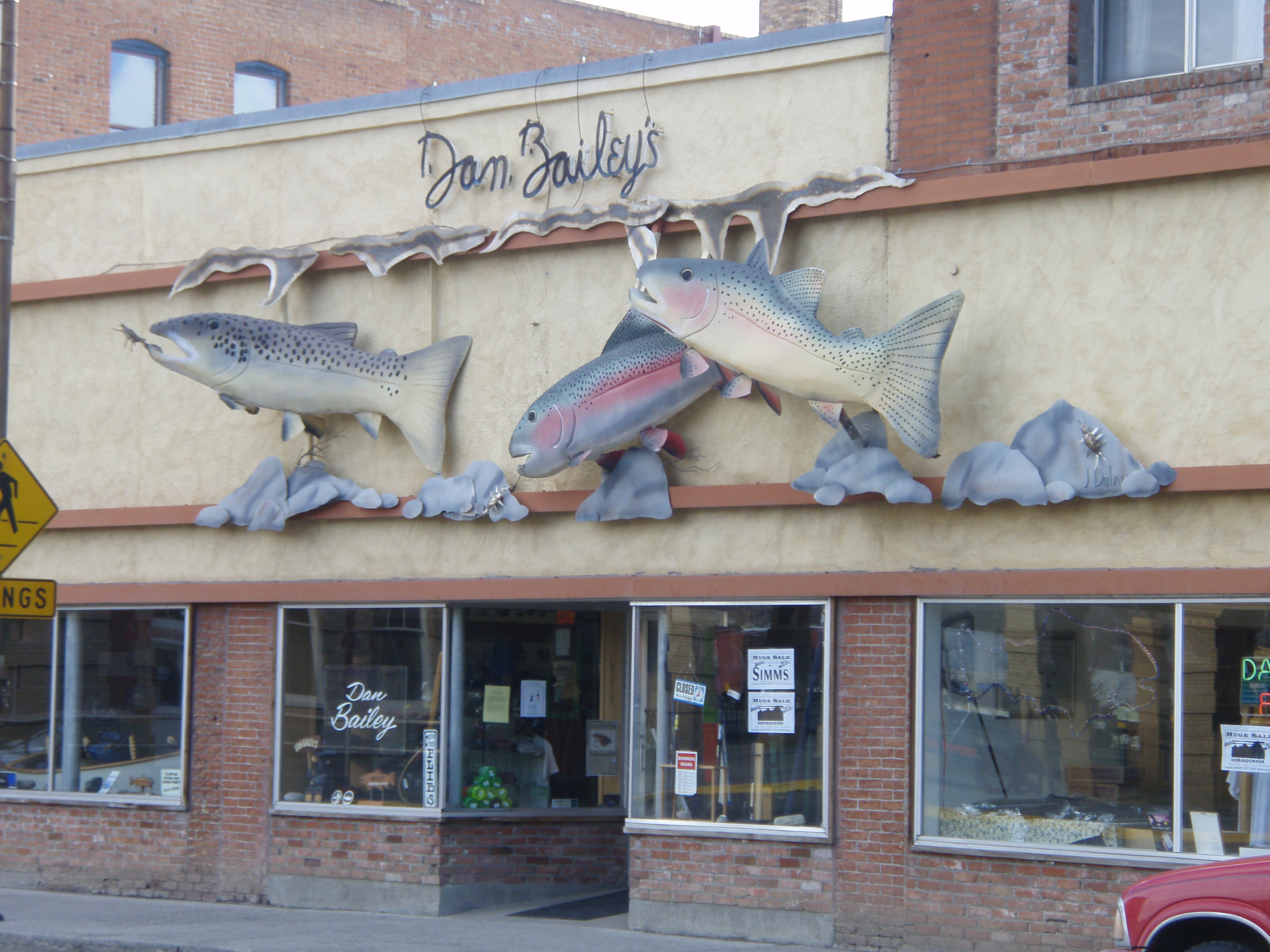
Dan Bailey's Fly Shop, Livingston, Montana (2008)

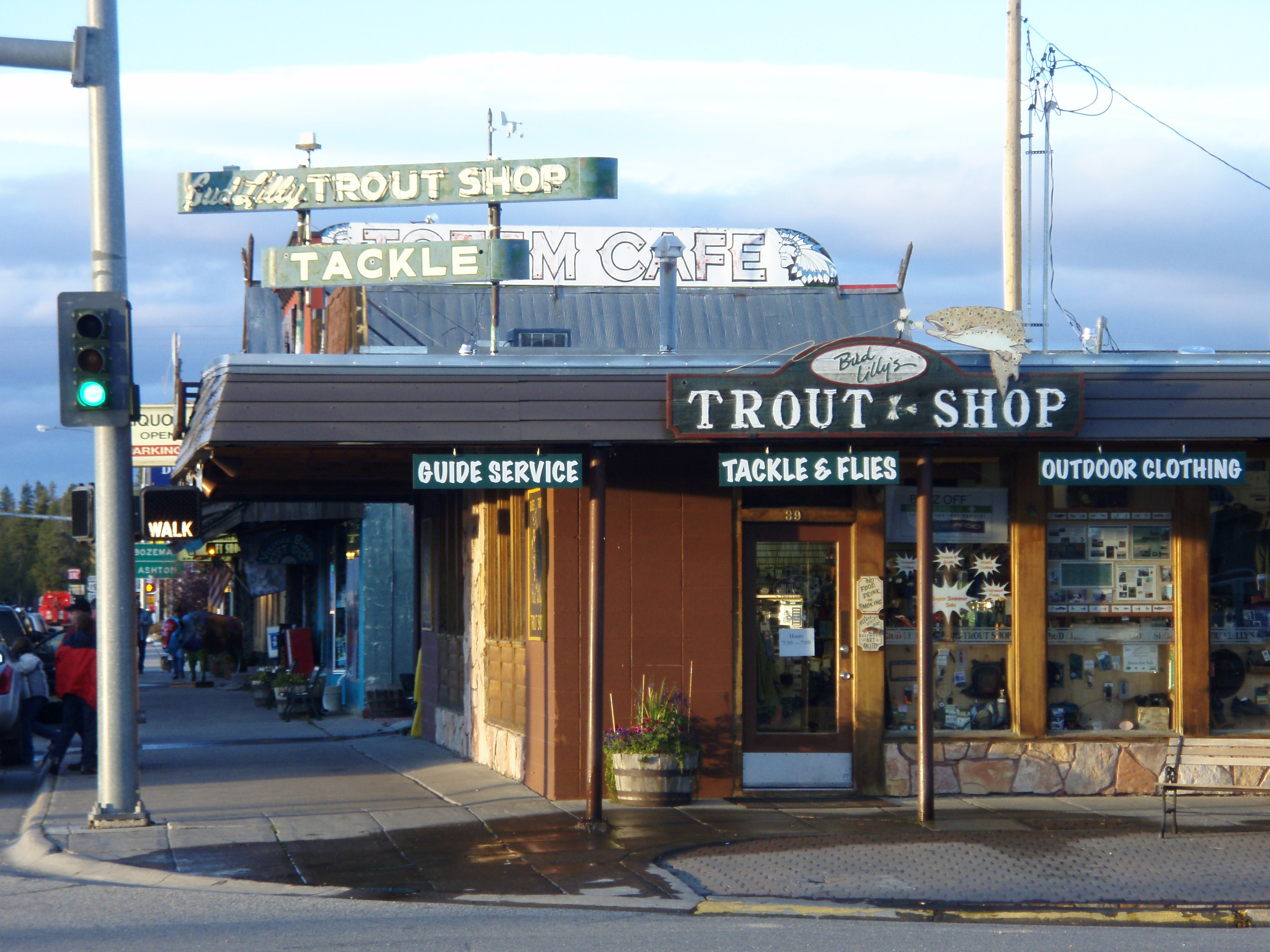
Bud Lilly's Trout Shop, West Yellowstone, Montana (2007)

Charles Brooks was a trout fishing technician whose works Larger Trout for the Western Fly Fisherman (1970), The Trout and the Stream (1974) and Nymph Fishing for Larger Trout (1976) were largely based on research and fishing experiences in Yellowstone and adjacent waters. Brooks was a retired Air Force officer who settled in West Yellowstone in 1961 and began a quest to understand the entomology of Yellowstone's rivers, especially the imitation and presentation of nymphs. Brooks immortalized the Madison River as an angling icon in his The Living River—A Fisherman's Intimate Profile Of The Madison River Watershed—Its History, Ecology, Lore, and Angling Opportunities (1979).

One cannot own a river or even part of it, except in one's heart. But if affection, pride, knowledge, and experience for and about a river counts for anything, the part of the Madison River in Yellowstone Park belongs to me. It also belongs to 220 million other Americans, but few know and love it as I do.

== Fly fishing in Yellowstone ==
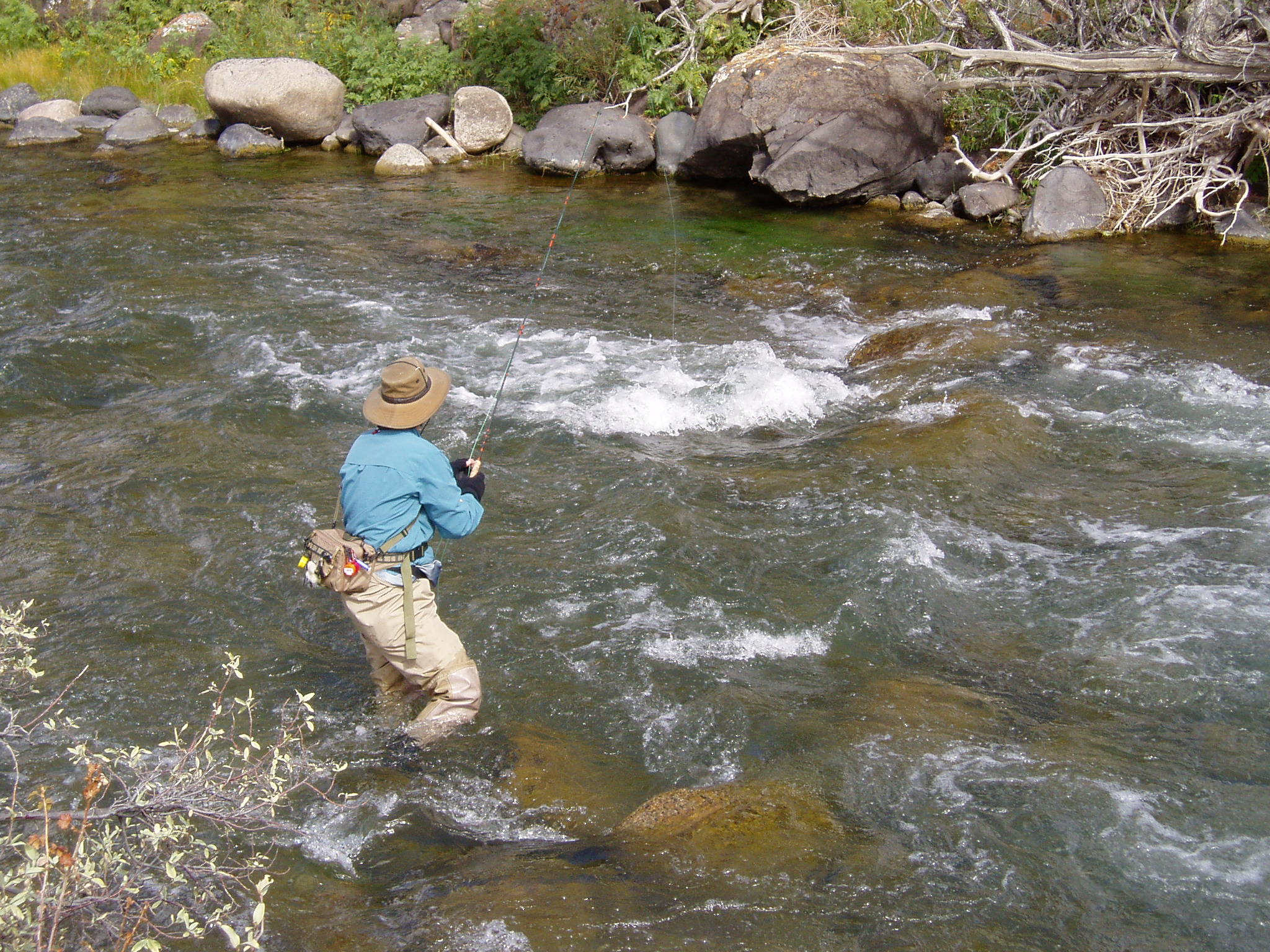
Nymphing in the Gardner River

Today, Yellowstone National Park is a fly fishing destination. Although artificial lures are allowed in some waters, most anglers, especially in the rivers and streams are fly fishermen. The accessible, insect rich rivers and streams provide reliable hatches and allow both novice and accomplished anglers alike a wide variety of opportunities for both technical and easy dry fly, wet fly, nymph or streamer fly fishing. There are nearly 50 outfitters in Montana, Wyoming, and Idaho licensed to provide guided fly fishing experiences in the park and operate fly shops outside the park.

Major hatches and typical patterns used
Hatch	Typical Patterns
Mayflies
Baetidae (Blue-Winged Olives); Ephemerellidae (Hendricksons, Sulphurs, Pale Morning Duns); Drunella (Green drakes); Siphlonuridae (Gray drakes); Heptageniidae (March Browns, Cahills, Quill Gordons, Pink Ladys)	Adams; Sparkle Dun; Green Drake Emerger; Blue Wing Olive; Pheasant Tail Nymph; Prince Nymph
Caddisflies
Brachycentridae (Apple caddis and grannoms); Hydropsychidae (Spotted sedges); Glossosomatidae (Little black caddis); Lepidostomatidae (Little brown-green sedges); Rhyacophilidae (Green sedges)	Soft hackle nymphs; Elk hair caddis; Sparkle pupa
Stoneflies
Pteronarcys california (Salmon Fly); Hesperoperla pacifica (Golden Stone); Suwallia pallidula, Isoperla sp. (Little Yellow Stoneflies)	Sofa Pillow; Salmon Fly nymph; Brook's Montana Stone; Golden Stone Nymph; Little Yellow Stone
Terrestrials
Ants; Grasshoppers, Crickets; Worms	Foam Ant; Fur Ant; Dave's Hopper; Foam Hopper; San Juan Worm
Baitfish
Sculpin; Longnose dace; Silverside minnow; Chub	Muddler Minnow; Woolhead sculpin; Dark Spruce; Woolly Bugger

== Major rivers ==
Image	Description
Gallatin River 44°51′29″N 110°53′01″W
Gallatin River (1997)	The Gallatin River is a headwater tributary of the Missouri River, approximately 120 mi (193 km long), in the U.S. states of Wyoming and Montana. It is one of three rivers, along with the Jefferson and Madison, that converge near Three Forks, Montana, to form the Missouri. It rises in the northwest corner of the park and flows 23 miles (37 km) north through the park into Montana. The Gallatin contains rainbow trout, brown trout and mountain whitefish. Access to the lower 11 miles (18 km) of the Gallatin River in the park is excellent along Highway 191. The Gallatin in the park is small and twists and turns with numerous undercut banks and many runs, riffles and holes. The water is very clear and cold and fishes best in midsummer after runoff. Fishing pressure on the Gallatin River is moderate. The Gallatin River in the valley section has excellent fly fishing for both rainbow and brown trout. Average rainbow size is 12 inches (300 mm). Brown trout average between 12 and 14 inches, although larger fish are often caught. An unlimited number of brown or rainbow trout may be harvested daily. All whitefish and cutthroat trout caught must be released.
Madison River 44°38′32″N 110°51′56″W
Madison River near sevenmile (11 km) bridge	The Madison River is a headwater tributary of the Missouri River, approximately 183 miles (295 km) long, in the U.S. states of Wyoming and Montana. Its confluence with the Jefferson and Gallatin rivers near Three Forks, Montana form the Missouri River. The Madison rises in Park County in northwestern Wyoming at the confluence of the Firehole and Gibbon rivers, a location known as Madison Junction in Yellowstone National Park. It flows west then north through the mountains of southwestern Montana to join the Jefferson and Gallatin rivers at Three Forks. The 19 miles (31 km) of the Madison in the park, although easily accessible, is not suited for beginners and offers technical dry fly and nymph fishing for rainbow and brown trout averaging from ten to fourteen inches (356 mm), with an occasional 20-incher. Most of the river inside the park resembles a large spring creek and has been called the "world's largest chalkstream". The Madison is an early summer and fall river and offers poor fishing in midsummer because of high temperatures contributed by the Firehole. Fishing in the fall is excellent when significant numbers of brown and rainbow trout enter the river from Hebgen Lake in Montana. These are usually taken with large streamer patterns. Many pools and runs on the Madison have angler-given names reminiscent of eastern trout stream and British salmon rivers—The Barns, Beaver Meadows, Grasshopper Bank, Cable Car Run and Baker's Hole. The Madison River is fly fishing only in Yellowstone National Park and all fishing is catch and release.
Firehole River 44°20′37″N 110°52′43″W
Typical Firehole River brown trout taken on an olive Woolly Bugger at Muleshoe Bend. (Released)	The Firehole River is a famous and storied destination for serious fly fisherman and runs completely within the park boundary. It is the major tributary of the Madison River providing some 70% of the volume. When it was discovered in the 1830s by American explorers, the Firehole was barren of trout above what is now called Firehole Falls. Brook trout were first introduced to the upper Firehole in 1889, while brown trout, the river's most plentiful trout today, was first stocked in 1890. Rainbow trout were not introduced until 1923. Mountain whitefish are native to the Firehole below Firehole Falls. The Firehole is one of those rivers with angler-given names to various famous and productive sections such a Muleshoe Bend and the Broads. The Firehole has been called the "strangest trout stream on Earth." This spring-fed river flows through the most active geyser basins in Yellowstone Park, so the angler is often fishing against a backdrop of steam rising from a gurgling hot spring. The Firehole provides excellent dry fly fishing from opening day until it warms too much from geysers by the end of June. For the most part the Firehole is an easily accessible, slow moving meadow stream that demands careful presentations and imitative flies for the prolific caddis and mayfly hatches. Fall fishing in September and October is again excellent as the river cools. The Firehole River is fly fishing only and rainbow and brown trout are catch and release only. Five brook trout may be harvested daily.
Gibbon River 44°45′10″N 110°33′57″W
Gibbon River at Duck Rock (1963)	The Gibbon River begins in the center of Yellowstone National Park, at Grebe Lake. It flows for a short distance into Wolf Lake. Below Wolf Lake, the Gibbon River twists and turns through beautiful and varied country before its confluence with the Firehole River to form the Madison River. The upper section of Gibbon River has very difficult access being choked with thick forests and much downed timber. The fish, consisting of brook trout, rainbow trout and grayling are all on the small side, rarely exceeding 10 inches (250 mm). Below Gibbon Falls access is excellent and the river has a healthy mix of rainbow and brown trout. The lower river receives a good run of spawning browns in the fall. The Gibbon River is fly fishing only and catch and release below Gibbon Falls. Above the falls, any grayling or cutthroat trout caught must be released. An unlimited number of brook, rainbow and/or brown trout may be harvested daily in the waters above the falls.
Upper Yellowstone River 43°59′18″N 109°55′45″W
Upper Yellowstone River near Thorofare Creek (2000)	The upper Yellowstone River rises in northwestern Wyoming near Younts Peak at the Continental Divide in southwestern Park County. It flows northward some 25 miles (40 km) through Yellowstone National Park and into draining Yellowstone Lake. The upper Yellowstone is a meandering, many-channeled stream with a clean gravel or sand-silt bottom. It lies in a broad valley, one to three miles (5 km) across, which is often marshy or boggy. This cutthroat fishery and area is as primitive and wild as it was 200 years ago and is one of the most difficult, time-consuming places in Yellowstone Park to get to and is considered one of the remotest places in the lower 48 states. Three days is about the minimum time required to visit and fish it. The fish are not much different is size and abundance than in the lower river. There is probably no trout stream anywhere in the forty-eight lower states that has been less affected by man than this one. All cutthroat trout caught must be released.
Lower Yellowstone River 44°37′21″N 110°25′36″W
Fishing Bridge at Yellowstone Lake Outlet (1962)	The lower Yellowstone River begins at the outlet of Yellowstone Lake. After passing through Hayden meadows, it drops over the Upper and Lower Yellowstone Falls at the head of the Grand Canyon of the Yellowstone within the confines of the park. After passing through the Black Canyon of the Yellowstone downstream of the Grand Canyon, the river flows northward into Montana, exiting the park at Gardiner. A portion of this stretch (through Hayden Valley) is closed all year, but the rest is easily accessible and easily wadable. No floating is allowed. Hatches occur just after the opener, on July 1. Pale Morning Duns, Green Drakes, Gray drakes, caddis and salmonflies are found at that time. The river can be crowded at popular access points like Buffalo Ford. The canyon reaches inside Yellowstone National Park are accessible only by hiking or horseback. This is some terrific fishing at times, especially during the salmonfly hatch in early to mid-July. Good access points are at Canyon Village, Tower, and Gardiner with a couple of other trailhead access points in between. For anglers in good shape that like to combine some hiking and fishing, this is great water to explore. The scenery is magnificent. The river here is usually quite swift, with sheer canyon walls in spots. Wading can be dangerous in these sections, so be careful. The payoff are big fat cutthroats and some very nice rainbows. Below Knowles Falls, about four miles (6 km) upstream from Gardiner, anglers find browns and whitefish in addition to the rainbows and cutthroat trout. All whitefish and cutthroat trout caught in the Yellowstone River must be released. An unlimited number of rainbow or brown trout may be harvested from the lower Yellowstone River.
Gardner River 44°57′15″N 110°52′03″W
Lower Gardner River near Gardiner, MT in September	The Gardner River is a tributary of the Yellowstone River and enters the Yellowstone at the park boundary in the town of Gardiner, Montana. The Gardner can be divided into three sections. The upper river consists of meadows reminiscent of Slough Creek or Soda Butte, but contains plentiful brook trout instead of cutthroats. The middle Gardner is fast canyon water with long runs of pocket water interspersed with pools and runs. The lower Gardiner from Bolling River to the confluence with the Yellowstone is similar but access was seriously impacted by the 2022 Montana floods which damaged the old Mammoth–Gardiner road. The middle and lower sections contain good populations of rainbow, cutthroat and brown trout. In late fall, the Gardner is known for its annual run of spawning browns which travel up the river from the Yellowstone. The Gardner River's pocket water, bouldered pools and runs offer good dry fly and nymph fishing, especially in the late summer and fall. Although high runoff can impair early summer fishing, the Gardner does get a reliable hatch of large stoneflies in June and July. All whitefish and cutthroat trout caught in the Gardner River must be released. An unlimited number of brook, brown and/or rainbow trout may be harvested daily.
Lamar River 44°42′19″N 109°49′33″W
Lamar River 1998	The Lamar River is a tributary of the Yellowstone River, approximately 40 miles (48 km) long, in northwestern Wyoming in the United States. The river is located entirely within the park. It rises in the Absaroka Range, on the eastern edge of the park, and flows northwest through the northeast corner of the park. It is joined by many tributary streams, including Soda Butte Creek and Slough Creek and joins the Yellowstone near Tower Junction, just below the Grand Canyon of the Yellowstone. The river is very accessible and meanders through grassy meadows, with riffles, boulders, and undercut banks providing cover for mostly cutthroat trout. More rainbows are found as the river pours through a rocky canyon just before it joins the Yellowstone. The Lamar offers good dry fly fishing with heavy hatches of caddis, pale morning duns, and large Green Drake in July. Terrestrials are prominent in late summer. All cutthroat trout caught in the Lamar River must be released. All other fish, including identifiable cutthroat/rainbow hybrids, must be killed. Many fish can easily be identified as rainbows or hybrids and they must be killed. Other cases can be more difficult. If in doubt then look at the anal and pectoral fins. If the fish is a hybrid, or a rainbow, the tips are white. If they are not white then it is a cutthroat and must be carefully released.
Slough Creek 45°12′30″N 110°07′18″W
Lower Slough Creek	Slough Creek is a tributary of the Lamar River, approximately 25 mi (40 km) long, in Montana and Wyoming in the United States. It rises in southern Montana, in the Absaroka–Beartooth Wilderness in the Beartooth Mountains, and flows southwest, into the park and into Wyoming, then into the Lamar River. Slough Creek is one of the most popular fishing areas in Yellowstone Park. The access is relatively easy and the cutthroat fishing is some of the best in the world. The lower meadows of Slough Creek, below the campground, are easily accessible from parking areas between the campground and the Cooke City road. There are rainbows in this lower water as well as cutthroats. The upper meadows of Slough are accessed from a trailhead near the campground. The first meadow is a 45 minute walk from the trailhead. The first meadow is the most popular since it is close and the fishing is excellent. Slough Creek's second meadow is about a two hour hike. Cutthroat trout in Slough offer good dry fly fishing with heavy hatches of caddis, pale morning duns, and large Green Drake in July. Terrestrials are prominent in late summer. Fishing regulations for Slough follow the Lamar, above.
Soda Butte Creek 45°01′20″N 109°55′03″W
Soda Butte Creek (1979)	Soda Butte Creek is a major tributary of the Lamar River. Access is quite easy—the highway between Tower and the Northeast Entrance closely follows the river for almost the entire length. The fly fishing in Soda Butte Creek is excellent. Similar to the Lamar River, Soda Butte Creek can run high and muddy during spring run-off, an event that can last through late-July in some years. However, once Soda Butte Creek begins to clear, excellent fly fishing for cutthroat trout can be found on the lower section of the river, generally defined as downstream from the Pebble Creek campground area. Average rainbow trout size runs around 12 inches (300 mm), with fish exceeding 16 inches (410 mm) not uncommon,. Fishing regulations for Soda Butte follow the Lamar, above.
Lewis River 44°21′19″N 110°39′54″W
Lewis River in Southwest Yellowstone National Park	The Lewis River begins at the southern end of Shoshone Lake and flows southerly approximately 4.5 miles (7.2 km) to Lewis Lake. This short stretch of the river known as the Lewis River Channel is the only portion of the river where boating is permitted. The river reemerges at the southern end of Lewis Lake and flows in a general southerly direction through a steep canyon roughly paralleling the south entrance road toward the south entrance of the park The Lewis River Channel is noted for its outstanding fall fishing for large spawning brown and lake trout migrating out of Shoshone and Lewis lakes. The lower gradient sections below Lewis Lake and as the river enters the Snake River provide good fishing for brown and brook trout. The steep canyon section is difficult to access and is typically not very productive fishing. All cutthroat and rainbow trout caught must be released. Brown and brook trout caught above Lewis Falls may be harvested within limits.
Bechler River
Bechler River in extreme Southwest corner of Yellowstone (1964)	Bechler River
Snake River 44°07′49″N 110°13′10″W
Snake River in winter (2000)	The Snake River is formed by the confluence of three tiny headstreams on the southwest flank of Two Oceans Plateau in western Wyoming and Yellowstone National Park and flows west and south into Jackson Lake in Grand Teton National Park. The entire course of the Snake in the park lies within Yellowstone backcountry except where it exits the park at the South Entrance station. The South Boundary Trail, which connects with the Snake River Trail, provides good access for anglers. The Snake fishes well for 12-14" Snake River fine-spotted cutthroat trout and whitefish. Spawning brown trout from Jackson Lake migrate into the river in the fall. An unlimited number of brown and/or rainbow trout may be harvested daily. All whitefish and cutthroat trout caught must be released.

== Major lakes ==
Image	Description
Yellowstone Lake 44°28′N 110°22′W
Lake trout, Yellowstone Lake, 2009	Yellowstone Lake is the largest body of water in the park. The lake is 7,732 feet (2,357 m) above sea level and covers 136 square miles (350 km^{2}) with 110 miles (180 km) of shoreline. While the average depth of the lake is 139 feet (42 m), its deepest spot is at least 390 feet (120 m). Yellowstone Lake is the largest freshwater lake above 7,000 feet (2,100 m) in North America. Historically, Yellowstone Lake has been a major fishing destination for cutthroat trout which could be easily caught from shore with lures and flies. Today, cutthroat trout populations are declining as a result of the unauthorized introduction of lake trout into the lake. The lake generally opens for angling in mid-June. All cutthroat trout caught must be released and all lake trout caught must be killed.
Heart Lake 44°16′04″N 110°29′20″W
Heart Lake (1962)	Heart Lake holds Yellowstone cutthroat trout, lake trout, and mountain whitefish. Lake trout were introduced in the 1890s. Angling is restricted to fly fishing or artificial lures. All cutthoat trout and whitefish must be released. There is no limit on the number of lake trout harvested. The park record lake trout, 42 pounds (19 kg), was caught in Heart Lake. Heart Lake is 7.5 miles (12.1 km) from the south entrance road at Lewis Lake via the Heart Lake trail. Heart Lake can also be reached via the Trail Creek trail that traverses the southern shoreline of Yellowstone Lake or via the Heart River Trail/Snake River Trail from the park's southern border. Heart Lake is within the Heart Lake Bear Management Area and access to the area is closed between April 1 and June 1 annually.
Shoshone Lake 44°22′20″N 110°42′45″W
Shoshone Lake (1989)	Prior to 1890, Shoshone Lake was barren of fish as Lewis Falls on the Lewis River was a barrier to upstream migration. In 1890, fisheries personnel planted lake and brown trout and created a popular fishery, especially for large brown trout in the fall. The lake also contains the Utah chub which was probably inadvertently introduced by bait anglers in the 1950s. Brook trout were planted in several tributary streams and are occasionally found in the lake. Angling is restricted to fly fishing or artificial lures. Boating on Shoshone Lake is restricted to hand-powered craft only, which means float tubes, kayaks or canoes. The lake is accessible by water via Lewis Lake and the Lewis River channel. Several trails provide access to the western, northern and eastern shoreline of the lake. The Shoshone Lake trail connects the Upper Geyser Basin and the Lewis River channel while passing through the Shoshone Geyser Basin at the southwest end of the lake. The DeLacy Creek trail provides access to the northern and eastern shoreline via the Grand Loop Road near Craig Pass. The Dogshead trail and Lewis River Channel trail provide access from the south entrance road near Lewis Lake. There are 20 backcountry campsites on Shoshone Lake.
Lewis Lake 44°18′16″N 110°37′46″W
Lewis Lake (1977)	Lewis Lake is a popular brown and lake-trout fishery. The 2,716-acre (10.99 km^{2}) lake is 12 miles (19 km) north of the South Entrance, on the West Thumb–South Entrance Highway. Lewis and Yellowstone Lakes are the only lakes that allows motorized watercraft. Lewis Lake contains brook trout, browns, cutthroats, and lake trout. Most of the angling pressure is from spin fishers, but a few local fly anglers make the lake a regular stop, fishing the drop-off along the southwest shore with sinking lines and leech imitations. Fishing from a tube or a boat is more reliable than wade fishing the outlet. The best times to fish Lewis Lake are at ice-out in mid-June, warm summer evenings, and late October, when the spawning brown trout become aggressive. Streamers and leeches are effective in the early and late season with caddis the fly of choice on warm summer evenings.

== Minor streams, creeks and lakes ==
Image	Description
Grebe Lake 44°45′03″N 110°33′31″W
Grebe Lake grayling	Grebe Lake is a 156 acres (0.63 km^{2}) backcountry lake in Yellowstone National Park most noted for its population of Arctic grayling. Grebe Lake comprises the headwaters of the Gibbon River. Grebe Lake is located approximately 3.1 miles (5.0 km) north of the Norris-Canyon section of the Grand Loop Road. The trail to the lake passes through mostly level lodgepole pine forest and open meadows. There are four backcountry campsites located on the lake.
Trout Lake 44°54′02″N 110°07′50″W
Trout Lake, 2009	Trout Lake, formerly known as Fish Lake and Soda Butte Lake is a 12 acres (0.049 km^{2}) popular backcountry lake for hikers and anglers in Yellowstone National Park. The lake is located approximately .33 miles (0.53 km) north of the Northeast Entrance Road near the confluence of Pebble Creek and Soda Butte Creek. The lake sits in a depression on a high bench above the Soda Butte Creek canyon. A steep trail through a Douglas fir forest leads to the lake. The trailhead is located at: 44°53′57″N 110°7′21″W. Trout Lake has always been popular with anglers for its large (14-20 inch) Yellowstone cutthroat trout and very large (20-30 inch) rainbow trout and rainbow/cutthroat hybrids. The lake can be easily fished from the shoreline, but many anglers carry in float tubes to access the deeper parts of the lake. Using a float tube on Yellowstone lakes requires a park service boating permit. The lake opens for fishing in mid-June, but a section of the lake near the inlet stream is closed until mid-July to protect spawning cutthroat trout. All cutthroat trout and hybrids caught in Trout Lake must be released. Rainbow trout caught must be killed.

== Regulations ==
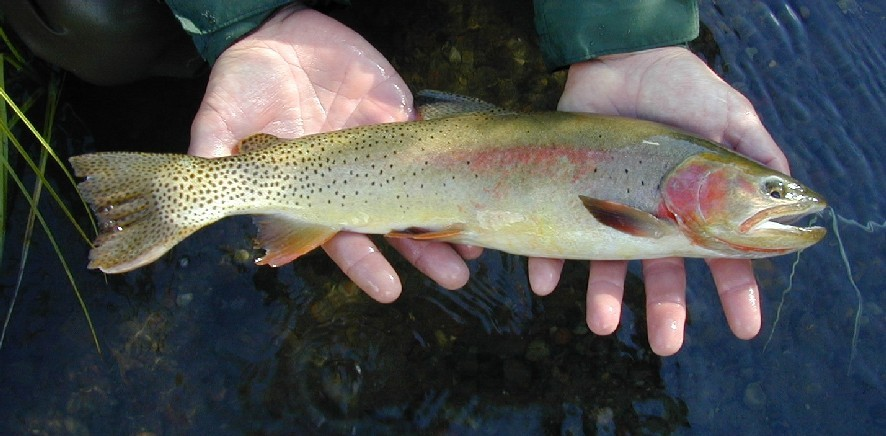
Yellowstone cutthroat trout

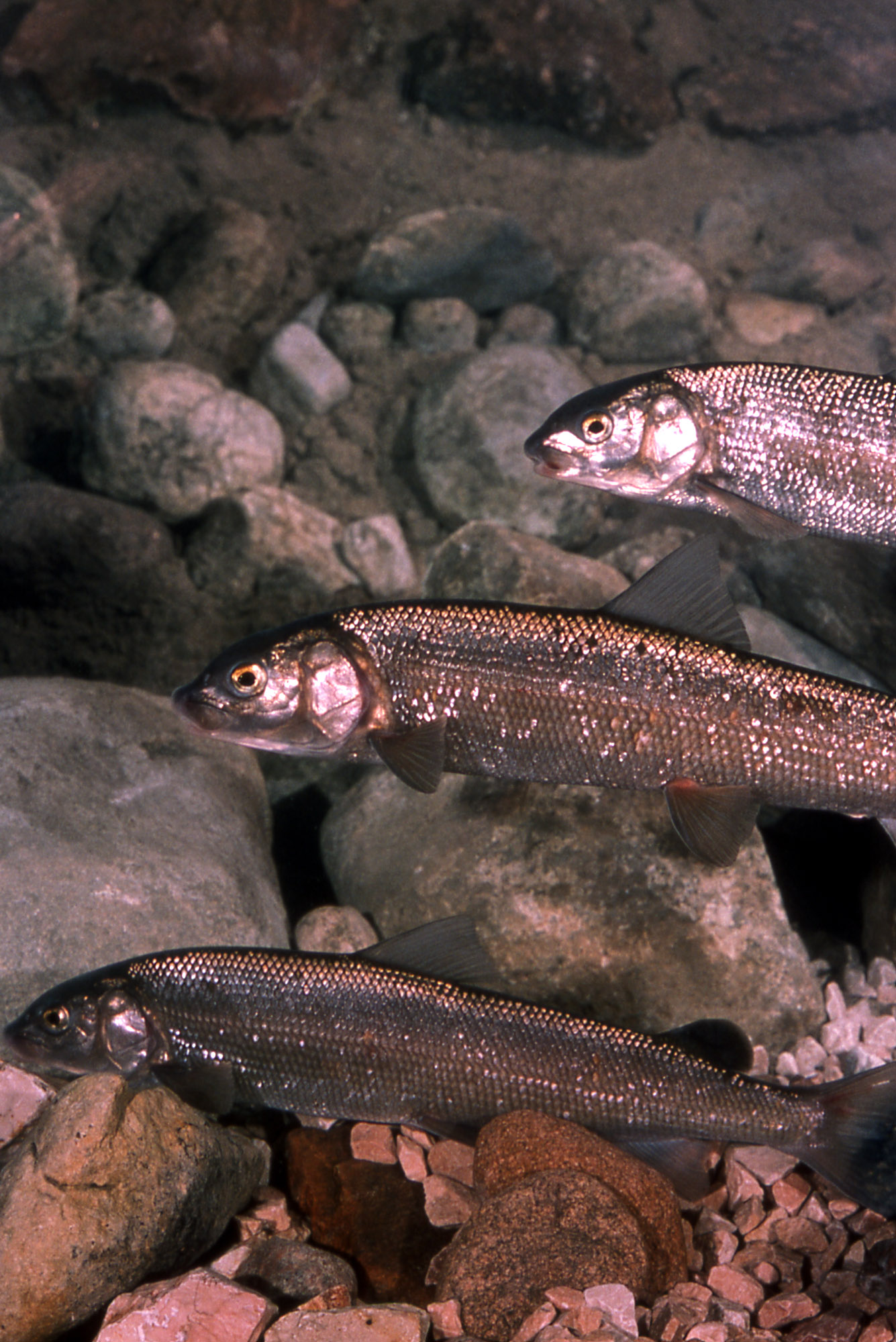
Mountain whitefish

Anglers are provided the latest park fishing regulations when they acquire their park fishing permit which can be obtained at all entrance stations and park concessionaires inside and outside the park. The 2021 season fishing regulations are summarized as follows:

Permits	Allowable methods	Natives and non-native species	Season and hours
$75 Season permit; $55 Seven day permit; $40 Three day permit	Hook and line only with artificial lures or flies; Some waters are fly fishing only; All hooks must be barbless or have barbs pinched closed; No lead weights or leaded flies allowed; Boats may not be used except in designated waters with a boating permit; Felt-sole footgear is prohibited	Cutthroat trout, whitefish and grayling are classified as native species and must be released when caught; Rainbow, brown, lake and brook are classified as non-native species and may be harvested in some waters; All lake trout caught in Yellowstone Lake, the Yellowstone River or its tributaries must be killed; All rainbow, rainbow/cutthroat hybrids and brook trout caught in the Lamar river watershed must be killed	Fishing in the park is open from the last Saturday in May to the first Sunday in November; Portions of the Yellowstone River open on July 15; Fishing may be done between the hours of 5 am and 10 pm; Some park waters are permanently closed to fishing to protect the fishery, thermal features or for the safety of anglers; All park waters are subject to seasonal closures or restrictions to protect the fisheries or for the safety of anglers

== See also ==
Fishes of Yellowstone National Park
