= Shoshone Lake =

Lake in Yellowstone National Park, Wyoming

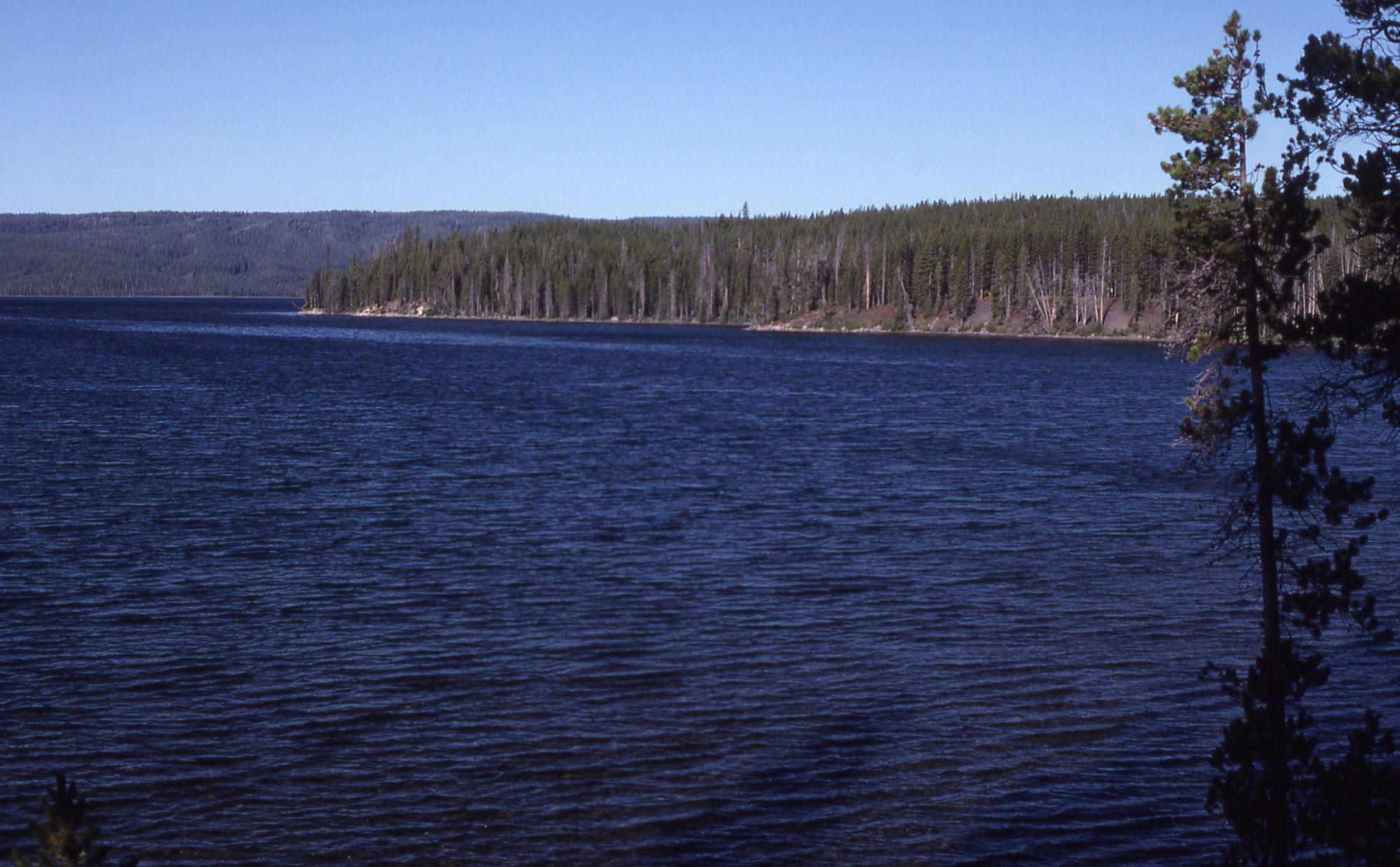
- Shoshone Lake in 1988

- Location within Wyoming Location within the United States
- Location: Yellowstone National Park, Teton County, Wyoming, U.S.
- Coordinates: 44°22′20″N 110°42′45″W
- Primary outflows: Lewis River
- Basin countries: United States
- Surface area: 8,050 acres (32.6 km^{2})
- Max. depth: 205 feet (62 m)
- Surface elevation: 7,795 feet (2,376 m)

Shoshone Lake is a U.S. backcountry lake with an area of 8,050 acres (33 km^{2}; 13 sq mi) with an elevation of 7,795 feet (2,376 m) in the southwest section of Yellowstone National Park in the state of Wyoming. It lies at the headwaters of the Lewis River, a tributary of the Snake River. The U.S. Fish and Wildlife Service believes that Shoshone Lake is the largest backcountry lake in the lower 48 states that cannot be reached by a road. The lake is located within the Yellowstone Caldera.

== History ==
Shoshone Lake has had many names since it was first viewed by fur trappers in the early 19th century. Jim Bridger may have visited the lake in 1833, but visited it in 1846. Trapper Osborne Russell visited the lake in 1839. During this period the lake was called Snake Lake. A map created by Father Pierre-Jean De Smet in 1851 showed the lake as DeSmet's Lake. Walter DeLacy, the Montana map maker named the lake DeLacy's Lake when he passed through the area in 1863.

During the Cook–Folsom–Peterson Expedition, the party camped at the north end of the lake on 29 September 1869, but did not refer to it by name in their journals. They did however incorrectly believe at the time that Shoshone Lake was the source of the Firehole and Madison Rivers. The belief that Shoshone Lake was the headwater lake for the Madison drainage continued during the Washburn-Langford-Doane Expedition in 1871. They viewed the lake to the south as they crossed the Continental Divide on 17 September 1870. Cornelius Hedges, a member of the Washburn expedition named the lake Washburn Lake to honor the expedition leader Henry D. Washburn, but that name was short-lived.

A. C. Peale of the Hayden Geological Survey of 1871 visited Shoshone Lake in August 1871 but referred to it as Madison Lake.

During the Hayden Geologic Survey of 1872, Frank Bradley, a member of the survey confirmed the lake was in the Snake River drainage and named the lake Shoshone Lake based on the Indian name of the Snake River.

== Shoshone Geyser Basin ==
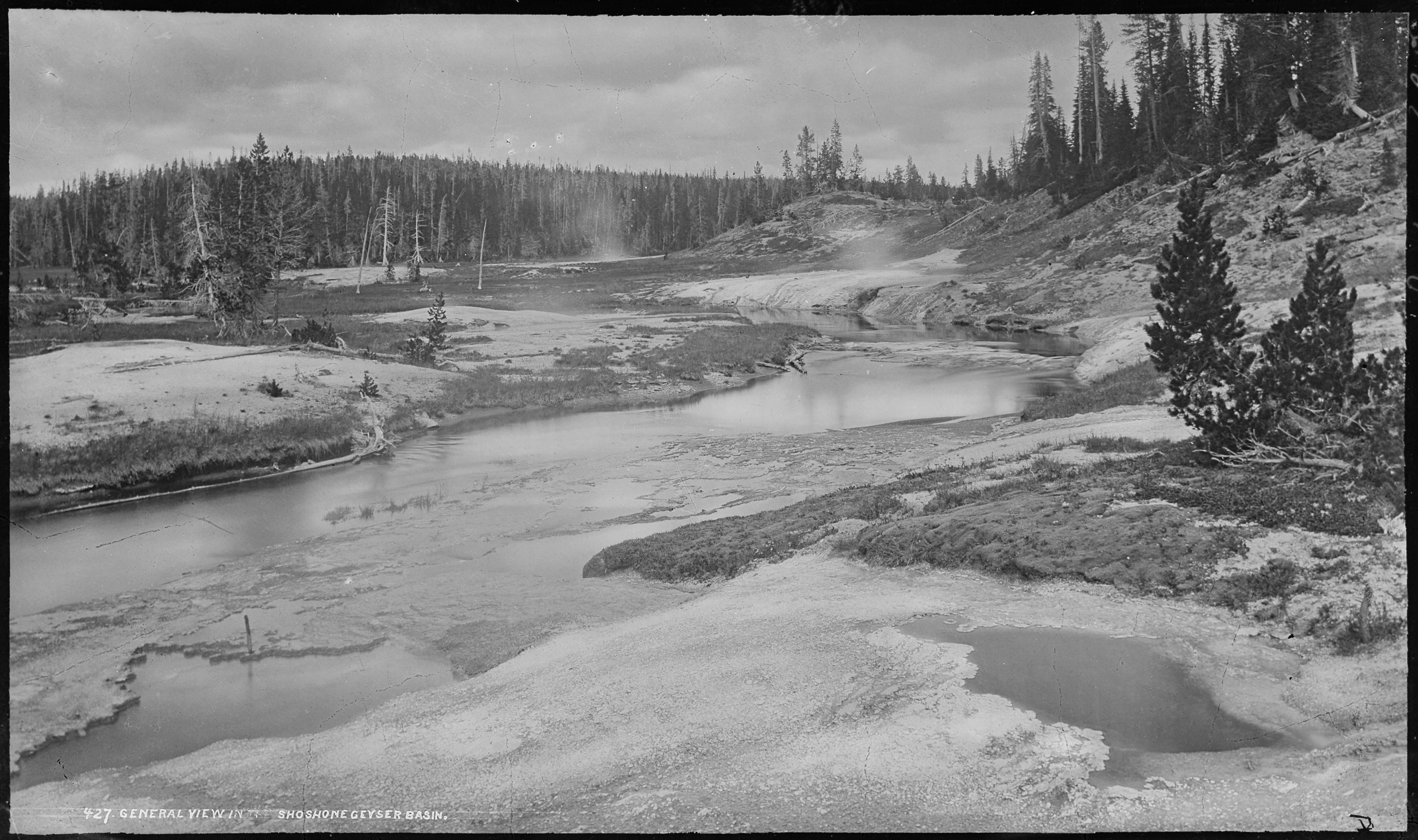
Shoshone Geyser Basin in 1878

Located at the southwest end of the lake, the Shoshone Geyser Basin contains one of the highest concentrations of geysers in the world - more than 80 in an area 1,600 feet (490 m) by 800 feet (240 m). Hot springs and mudpots dot the landscape between the geyser basin and the lake.

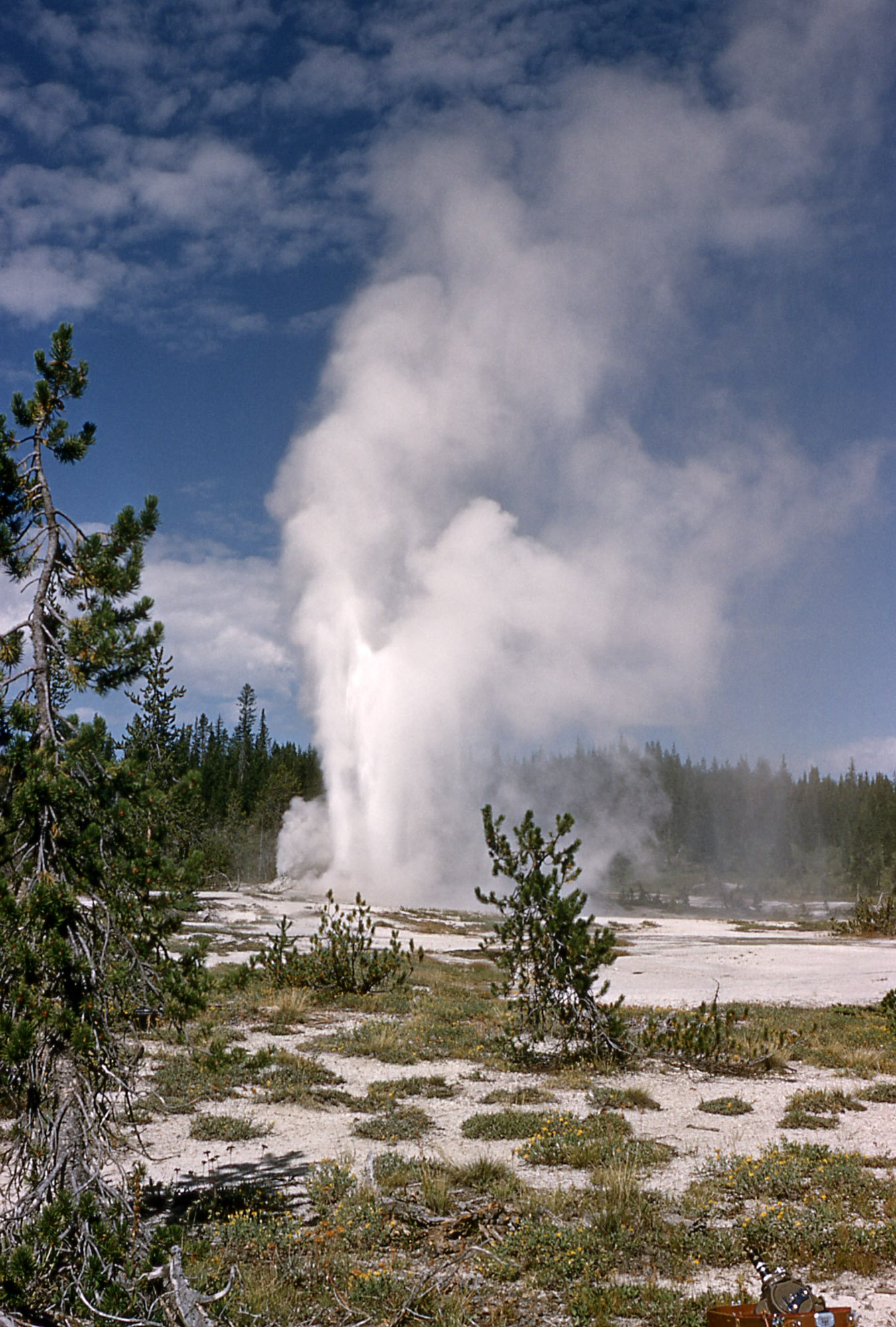
Union geyser, Shoshone Geyser Basin, 1955

== Angling ==
Prior to 1890, Shoshone Lake was barren of fish as Lewis Falls on the Lewis River was a barrier to upstream migration. In 1890, fisheries personnel planted Lake and Brown trout and created a popular fishery, especially for large Brown trout in the fall. The lake also contains the Utah chub which was probably inadvertently introduced by bait anglers in the 1950s. Brook Trout were planted in several tributary streams and are occasionally found in the lake. Angling is restricted to fly fishing or artificial lures. Boating on Shoshone Lake is restricted to hand-powered craft only, which means Float tubes, Kayaks or Canoes. Anglers may take up to five non-native trout, but only one brown trout. The lake is accessible by water via Lewis Lake and the Lewis River channel. Several trails provide access to the western, northern and eastern shoreline of the lake. The Shoshone Lake trail connects the Upper Geyser Basin and the Lewis River channel while passing through the Shoshone Geyser Basin at the southwest end of the lake. The DeLacy Creek trail provides access to the northern and eastern shoreline via the Grand Loop Road near Craig Pass. The Dogshead trail and Lewis River Channel trail provide access from the south entrance road near Lewis Lake. There are 20 backcountry campsites on Shoshone Lake.

Images of Shoshone Lake

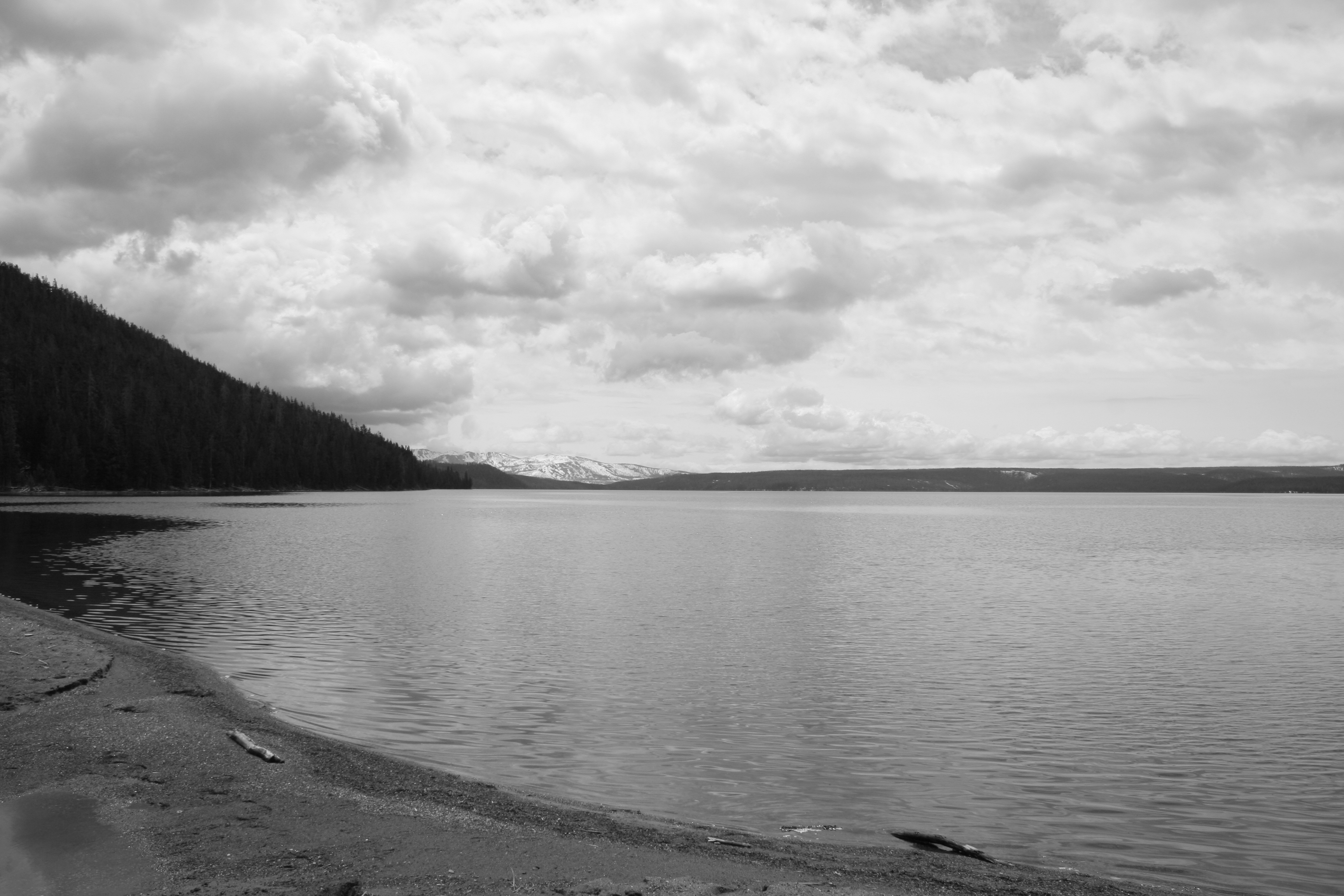
Shoshone Lake

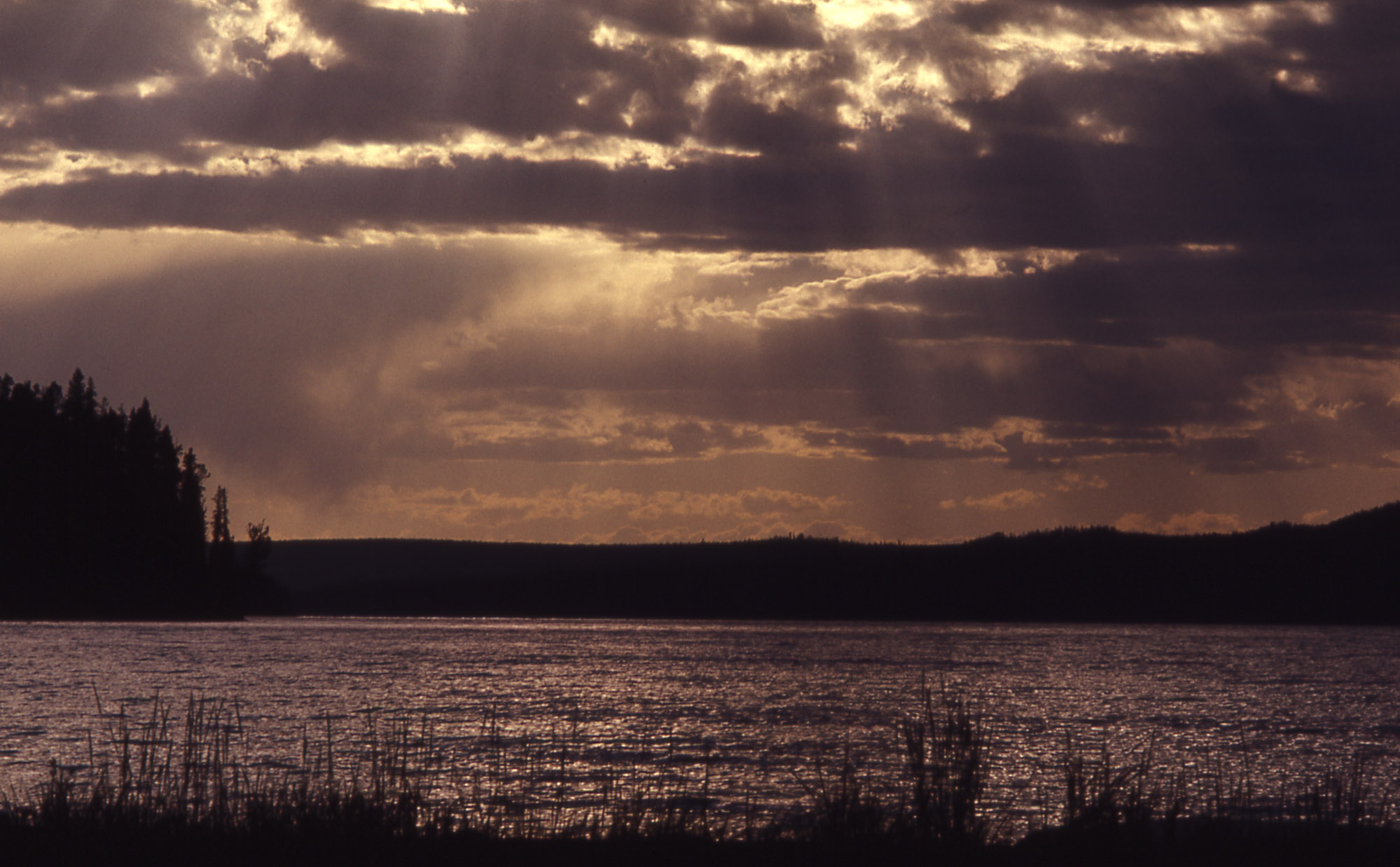
Sunset, 1970

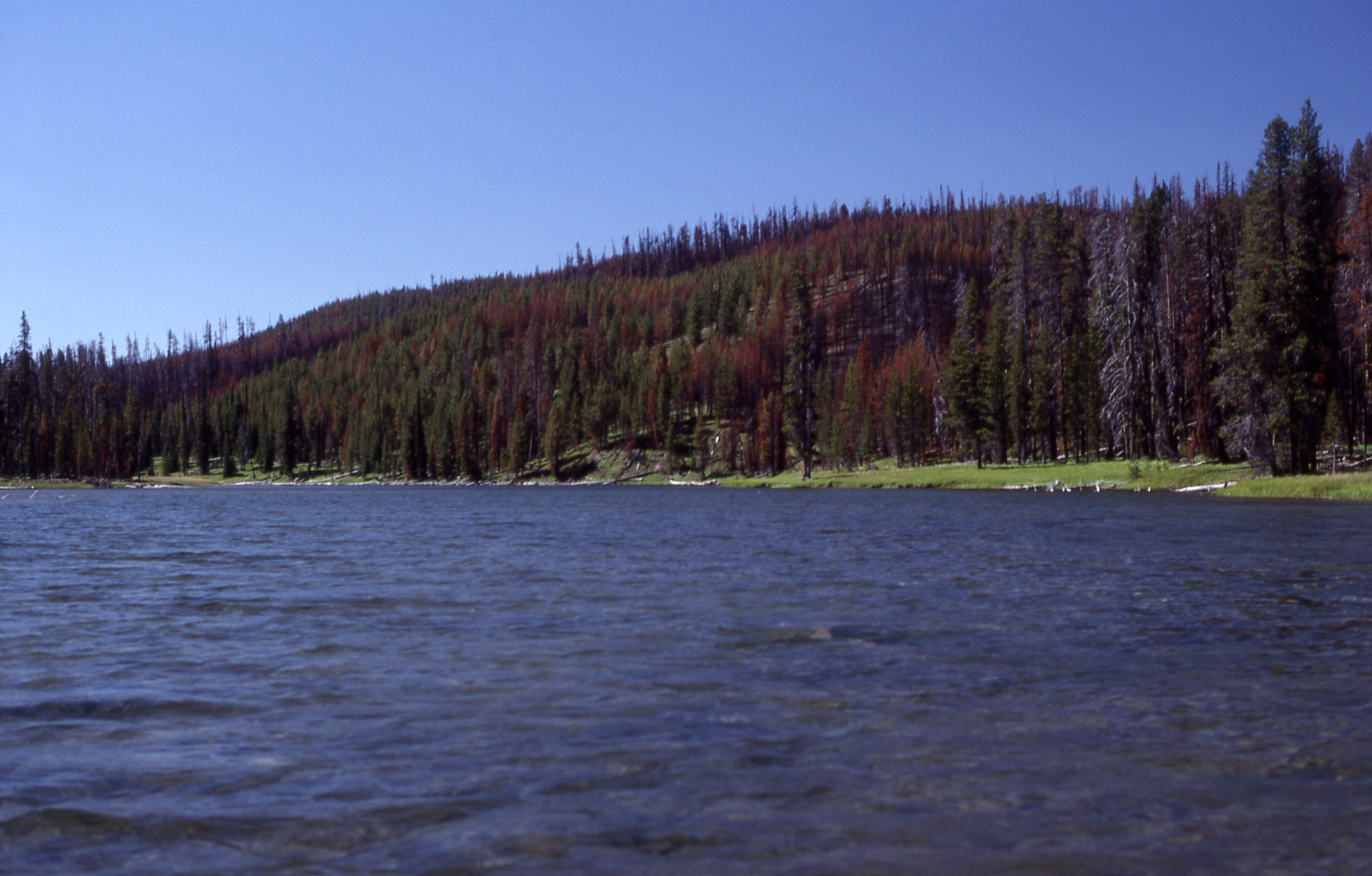
Lewis River Channel Outlet, 1989

== See also ==
- Angling in Yellowstone National Park
- Fishes of Yellowstone National Park
