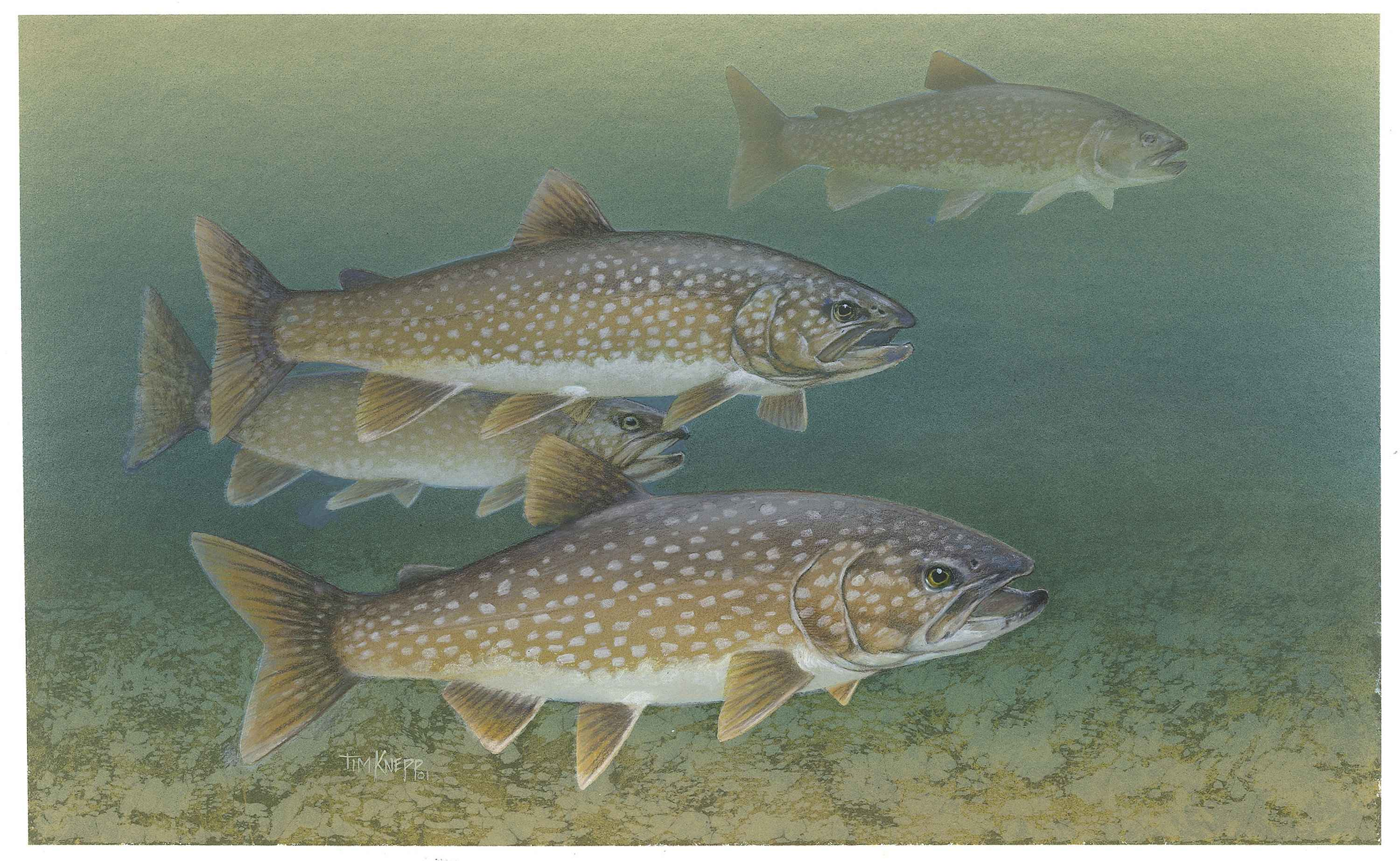

Conservation status
- Least Concern (IUCN 3.1)

- Secure (NatureServe)

Scientific classification
- Kingdom: Animalia
- Phylum: Chordata
- Class: Actinopterygii
- Division: Teleostei
- Order: Salmoniformes
- Family: Salmonidae
- Genus: Salvelinus
- Subgenus: Cristovomer; Walbaum, 1792
- Species: S. namaycush

Binomial name
- Salvelinus namaycush (Walbaum, 1792)

= Lake trout =

Species of fish in northern North America

The lake trout (Salvelinus namaycush) is a freshwater char living mainly in lakes in Northern North America. Other names for it include mackinaw, namaycush, lake char (or charr), touladi, togue, laker, and grey trout. In Lake Superior, it can also be variously known as siscowet, paperbelly and lean. The lake trout is prized both as a game fish and as a food fish. Those caught with dark coloration may be called mud hens.

== Taxonomy and etymology ==
It is the only member of the subgenus Cristovomer, which is more derived than the subgenus Baione (the most basal clade of Salvelinus, containing the brook trout (S. fontinalis) and silver trout (S. agasizii)) but still basal to the other members of Salvelinus.

The specific epithet namaycush derives from namekush, a form of the word used in some inland Southern East Cree communities in referring to this species of fish. Other variations found in East Cree are kûkamâs[h], kûkamâw and kûkamesh. Similar cognate words are found in Ojibwe: namegos = "lake trout"; namegoshens = "rainbow trout," literally meaning "little lake trout."

== Range ==
From a zoogeographical perspective, lake trout have a relatively narrow distribution. They are native only to the northern parts of North America, principally Canada, but also Alaska and, to some extent, the Northeastern United States. Lake trout have been widely introduced into non-native waters in North America and into many other parts of the world, mainly Europe, but also into South America and certain parts of Asia. Although lake trout were introduced into Yellowstone National Park's Shoshone, Lewis and Heart lakes legally in the 1890s, they were illegally or accidentally introduced into Yellowstone Lake in the 1980s where they are now considered invasive. They have also notably been introduced into the Tahoe region, such as in Lake Tahoe and Donner Lake.

== Description ==
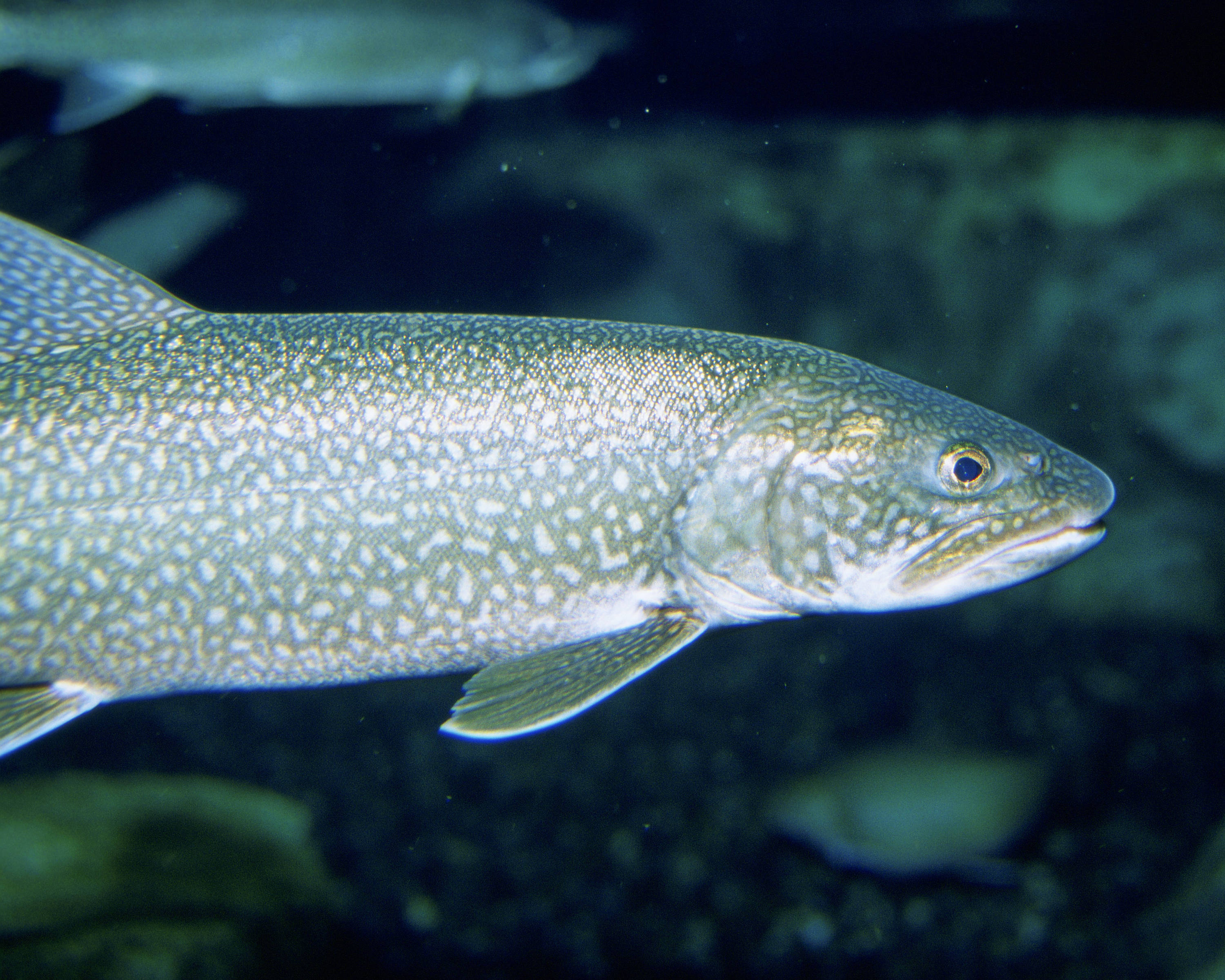
Lake trout swimming underwater

Lake trout have a common Salmonidae body, with an elongated figure, a single dorsal and adipose fin, and lack spines on any of their fins. The pattern of lake trout is a uniform olive-grey, darker near the back, and white on the belly. They are covered in light beige or white spots along the body. The fins are yellow-ish, and may have white tips. During spawning, the belly becomes more yellow-orange, and the fins develop a red hue with more developed white edges. They have small but sharp teeth, which are more visible compared to other species of trout during non-spawning periods.

Lake trout are the largest of the chars; the record weighed almost 102 pounds (46 kg) with a length of 50 inches (130 cm), and was caught with a gillnet. 15–40-pound (6.8–18.1-kilogram) fish are not uncommon, and the average length is 24–36 inches (61–91 centimetres). The largest caught on a rod and reel according to the IGFA was 72 pounds (33 kg), caught in Great Bear Lake in 1995 with a length of 59 inches (150 cm). In the Tahoe region, the fish do not exceeded 36 pounds (16 kg), but are on average over 10 pounds (4.5 kg).

== Life history ==
Lake trout inhabit cold, oxygen-rich waters. They are pelagic during the period of summer stratification in dimictic lakes, often living at depths of 20–60 m (66–197 ft).

The lake trout is a slow-growing fish, typical of oligotrophic waters. It is also very late to mature. Populations are extremely susceptible to overfishing. Many native lake trout populations have been severely damaged through the combined effects of hatchery stocking (planting) and over harvest. Another threat to lake trout is acidification, which can have longterm effects on their populations through both direct harm and reduced prey populations (e.g. Mysis relicta).

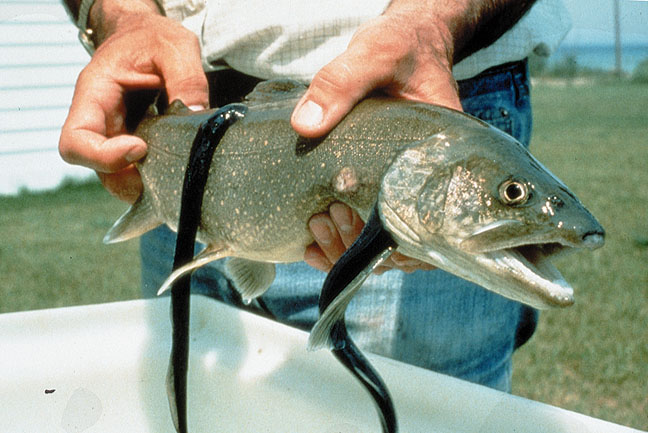
A lake trout being preyed upon by lampreys

There are three subspecies of lake trout. There is the common lake trout (Salvelinus namaycush namaycush), the siscowet lake trout (Salvelinus namaycush siscowet), and the less common rush lake trout (Salvelinus namaycush huronicus). Some lakes do not have pelagic forage fish during the period of summer stratification. In these lakes, lake trout act as planktivores. Lake trout in planktivorous populations are highly abundant, grow very slowly and mature at relatively small sizes. In those lakes that do contain deep-water forage, lake trout become piscivorous. Piscivorous lake trout grow much more quickly, mature at a larger size and are less abundant. Notwithstanding differences in abundance, the density of biomass of lake trout is fairly consistent in similar lakes, regardless of whether the lake trout populations they contain are planktivorous or piscivorous.

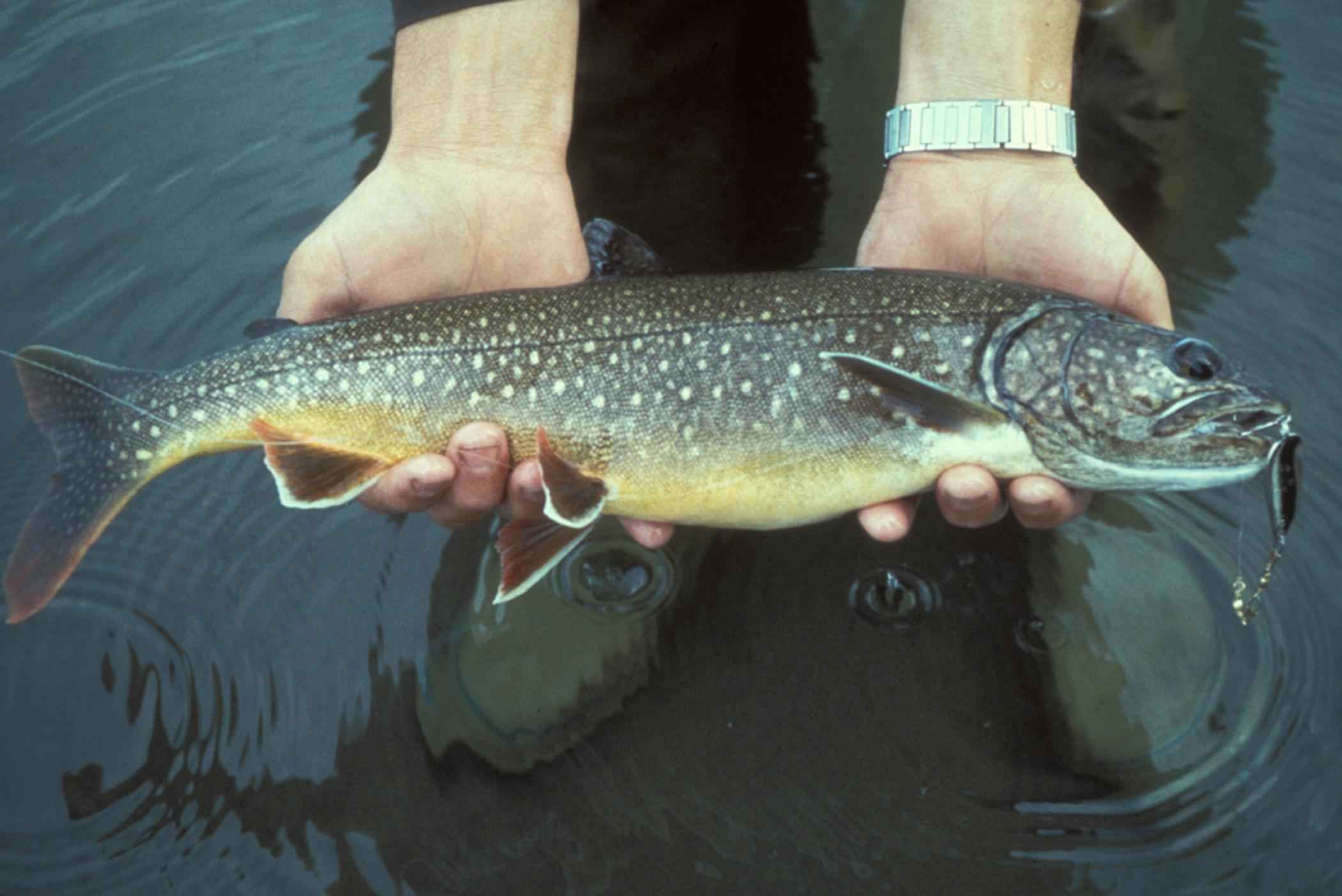
A lake trout in spawning dress.

In Lake Superior, common lake trout (S. n. namaycush) and siscowet lake trout (S. n. siscowet) live together. Common lake trout tend to stay in shallower waters, while siscowet lake trout stay in deeper water. Common lake trout (also called "lean" lake trout) are slimmer than the relatively fat siscowet. Siscowet numbers have become greatly depressed over the years due to a combination of the extirpation of some of the fish's deep water coregonine prey and to overexploitation. Siscowet tend to grow extremely large and fat and attracted great commercial interest in the last century. Their populations have rebounded since 1970, with one estimate putting the number in Lake Superior at 100 million. Professor of Zoology at the University of Wisconsin-Madison James Kitchell credits effective constraint of commercial fisheries and persistent sea lamprey (Petromyzon marinus) control for the successful recovery of Lake Superior's lake trout. "Looking at what has happened in the lake and the results of computer simulations, it is clear that lamprey control needs to continue if Lake Superior is to keep its lake trout."

== Hybrids ==
Lake trout are known to hybridize in nature with the brook trout (S. fontinalis); such hybrids, known as "splakes" (between a male brook and female lake trout) or the less common "brookinaw" (between a male lake and female brook trout,) are normally sterile but self-sustaining populations exist in some lakes. Splake are also artificially propagated in hatcheries, and then stocked into lakes in an effort to provide sport-fishing opportunities.

== Commercial fishing ==
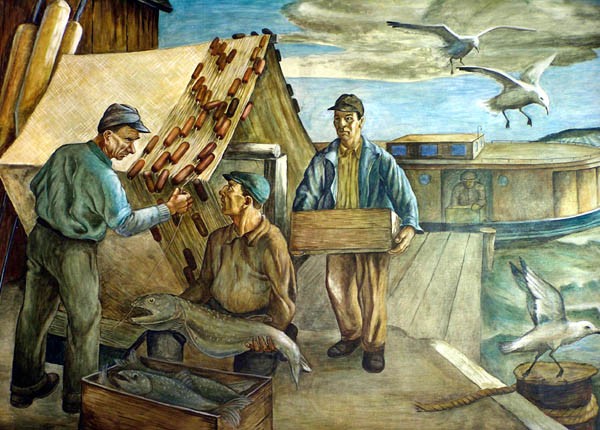
Fishermen drying a net and hauling lake trout; part of a 1940 mural in the Sturgeon Bay Post Office.

Lake trout were fished commercially in the Great Lakes until lampreys, overharvest and pollution extirpated or severely reduced the stocks. Commercial fisheries still exist in some areas of the Great Lakes and smaller lakes in northern Canada. Commercial fishing by Ottawa (Odawa) and Chippewa (Ojibwe) Indians for Lake Trout in Lake Michigan, Lake Huron and Lake Superior is permitted under various treaties and co-managed and regulated by many tribes and Great Lakes Indian Fish & Wildlife Commission (GLIFWC).

== Recreational angling ==
When lake trout are caught and released, the experience can cause short-term physiological and behavioural stress. Blood stress markers such as cortisol, lactate, and glucose increase after capture, particularly when fish fight for long periods, are exposed to air, or are angled from deep water. Deep-water captures can also cause barotrauma (i.e., injuries caused by rapid changes in pressure), resulting in bloating or disorientation due to rapid pressure changes. These effects are more common in larger fish and in warm-water conditions.

Responses differ between ice-angling and open-water angling. During ice-angling, fish often show higher lactate and glucose levels, lower blood pH, and loss of reflexes such as orientation and equilibrium, with some mortality observed after release. In open-water, stress responses are generally brief and mild with minor mortality; gill tissues show temporary activation of hsp70 stress genes, while other metabolic processes return to normal within two days. Differences are also influenced by factors such as sex, depth, and season. Careful handling, limiting fight time, reducing air exposure, and avoiding deep-water captures can improve survival and recovery following release.

== Popular culture ==
Geneva, New York claims the title "Lake Trout Capital of the World," and holds an annual lake trout fishing derby. Baraga county in Michigan also hosts an annual "lake trout festival" in June.
