= Lewis Lake (Wyoming) =

Lake in Yellowstone National Park

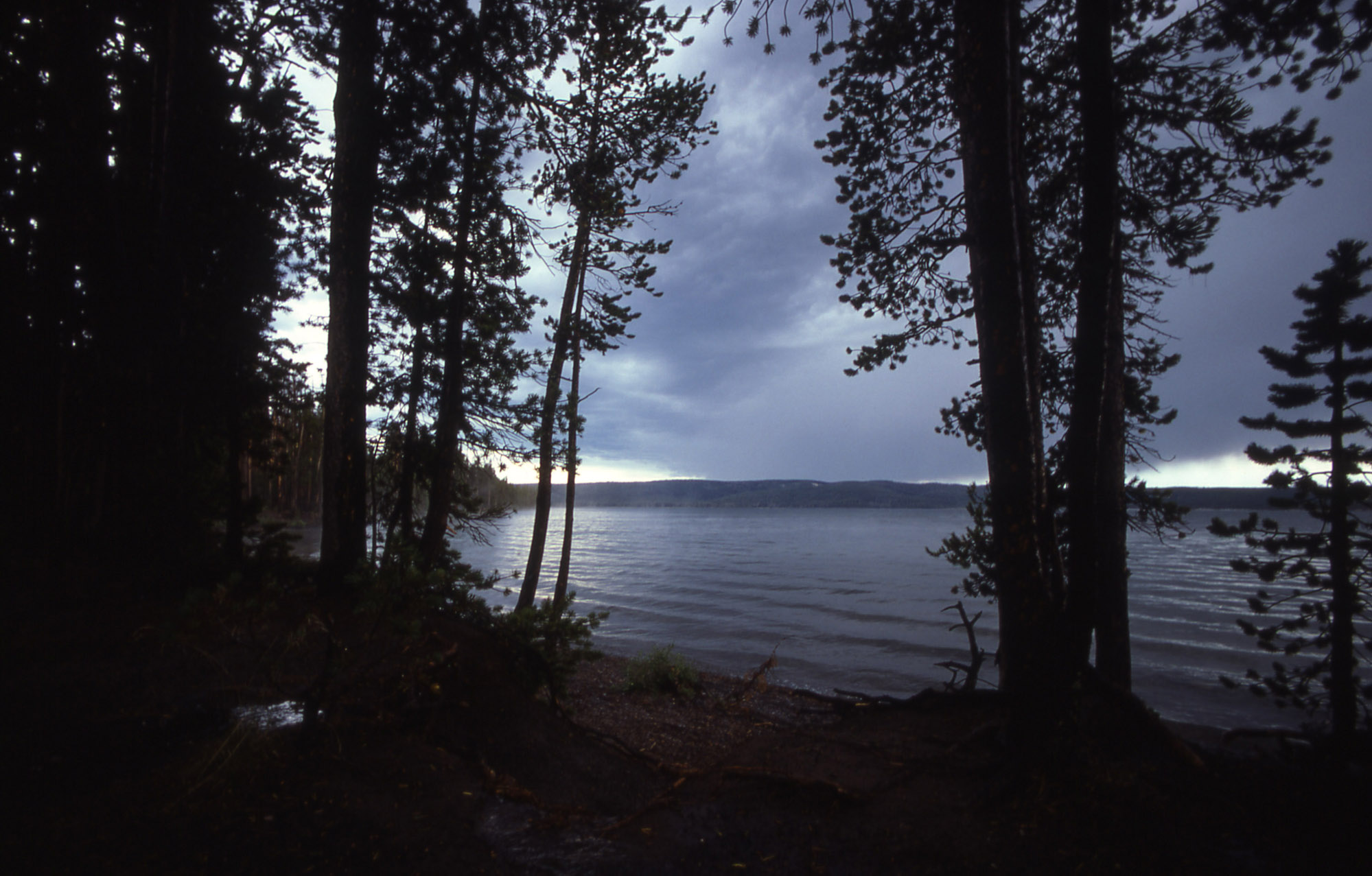

- Location within Wyoming Location within the United States
- Location: Yellowstone National Park, Teton County, Wyoming, US
- Coordinates: 44°18′16″N 110°37′46″W
- Lake type: Natural lake
- Primary inflows: Lewis River
- Primary outflows: Lewis River
- Basin countries: United States
- Surface elevation: 2,372 m (7,782 ft)

Lewis Lake is located in the U. S. state of Wyoming in the southern part of Yellowstone National Park, about 4 miles (6.4 km) southeast of Shoshone Lake, and approximately 10 miles (16 km) southwest of Yellowstone Lake. Lewis Lake and Shoshone Lake are both located a few miles northeast of the Pitchstone Plateau.

The Lewis River is the lake's primary inflow, draining south from Shoshone Lake. The primary outflow of Lewis Lake is also the Lewis River, continuing south to join the Snake River near the southern boundary of Yellowstone National Park. A few small creeks also feed Lewis Lake. There are several hot springs emptying into the lake on its northwestern shore and two more hot springs at the lake's southern end where it empties into the Lewis River. A campground is located on the lake's southeast shore. Yellowstone National Park's South Entrance Road (which is also numbered as U.S. Route 287, U.S. Route 89, and U.S. Route 191) runs along the east side of Lewis Lake.

Like the river, Lewis Lake is named for Meriweather Lewis, commander of the Lewis and Clark Expedition

Lewis lake holds brown, brook and lake trout and falls within the non-native trout tolerance area of the park. Anglers may keep up to five non-native trout per day but only one brown trout.

== See also ==
- Angling in Yellowstone National Park
- Fishes of Yellowstone National Park
- Media related to Lewis Lake at Wikimedia Commons
