= Lewis Falls =

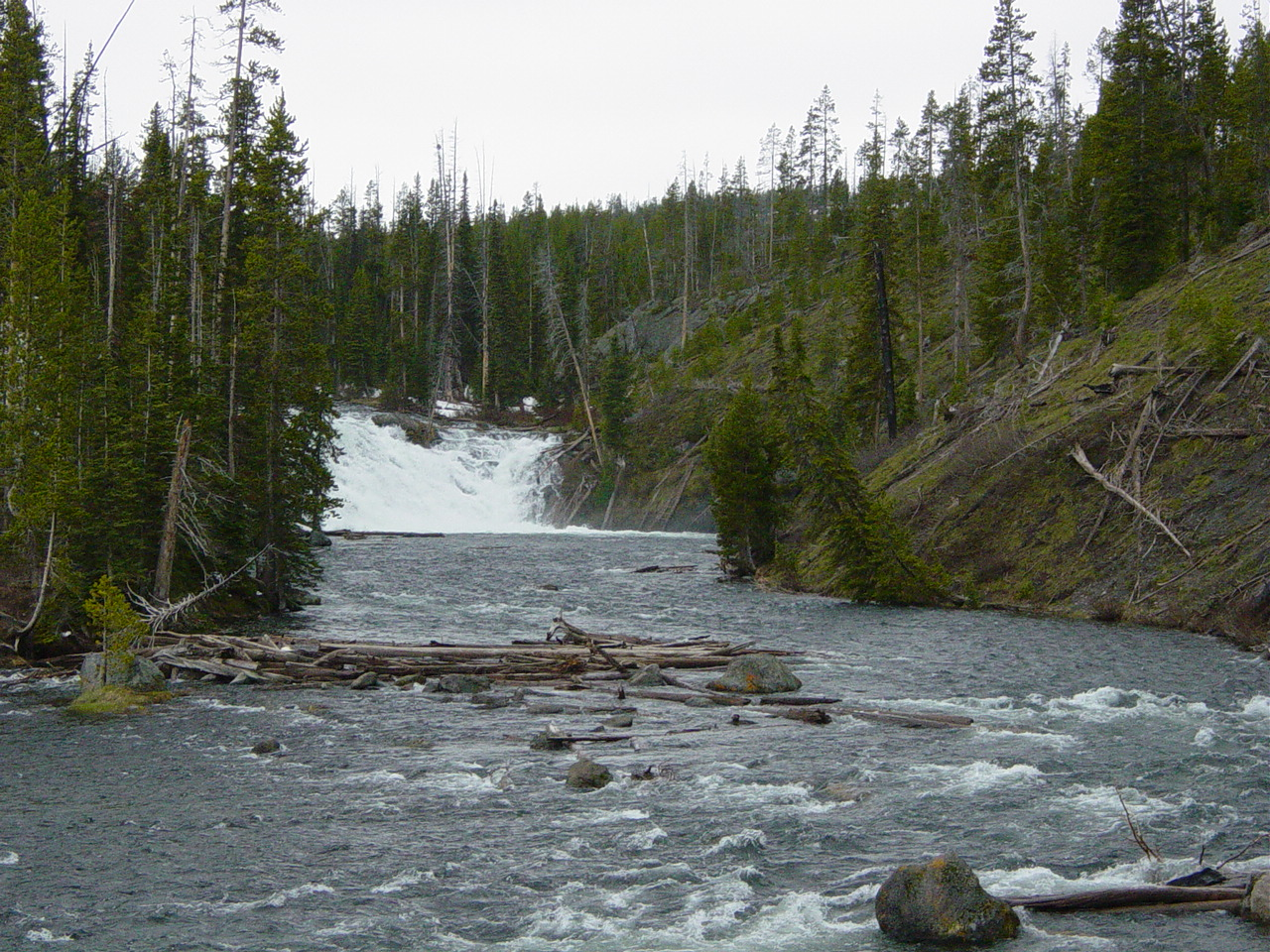
- Lewis Falls
- Interactive map of Lewis Falls
- Location: Yellowstone National Park, United States
- Coordinates: 44.2674°N 110.6357°W
- Type: Cascade
- Total height: 30 feet (9.1 m)
- Watercourse: Lewis River

The Lewis Falls are located on the Lewis River in Yellowstone National Park, Wyoming, United States. The falls drop approximately 30 feet (9.1 m) and are easily seen from the road, halfway between the south entrance to the park and Grant Village. The falls are on the Lewis River, just south of Lewis Lake.

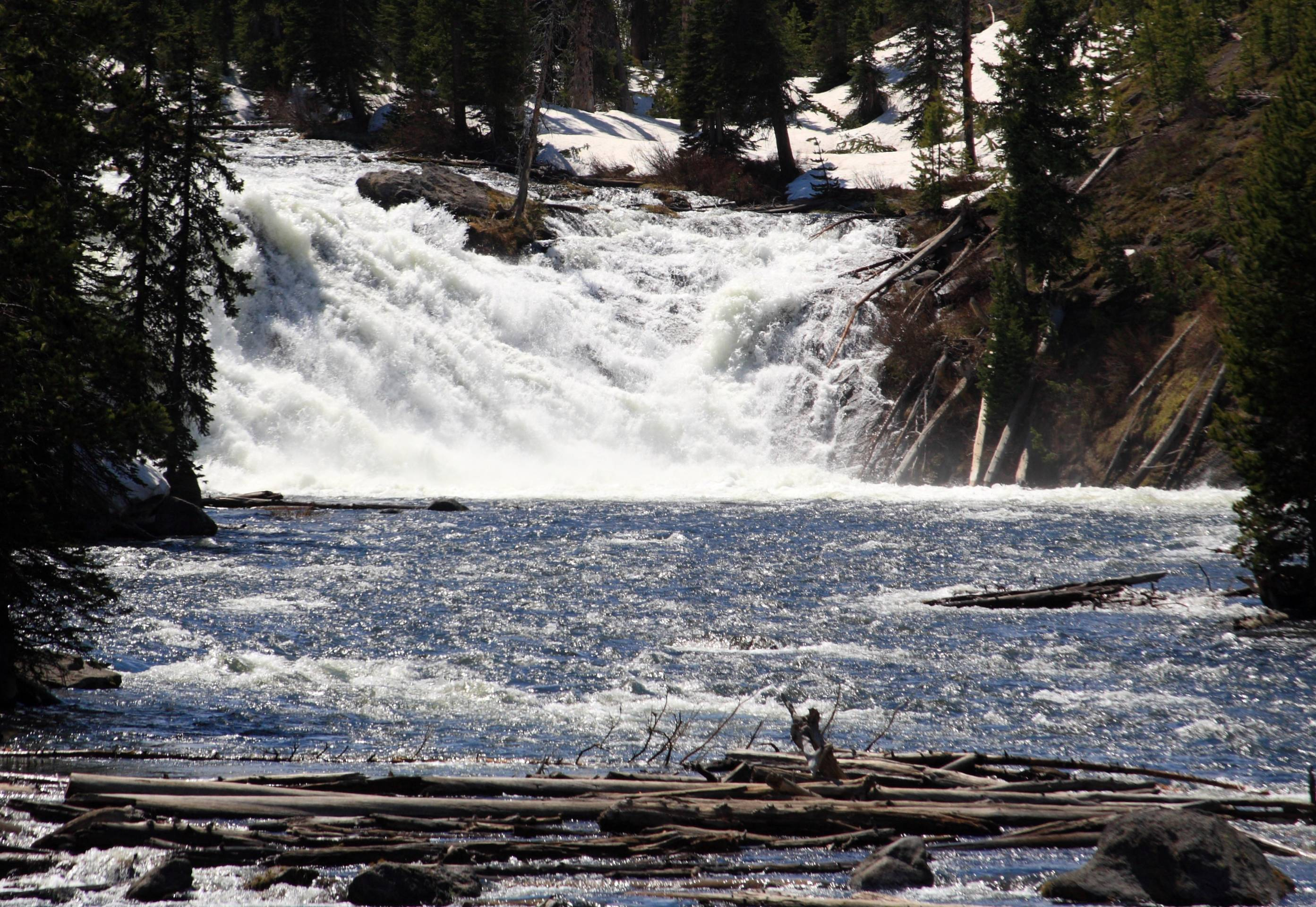
2009

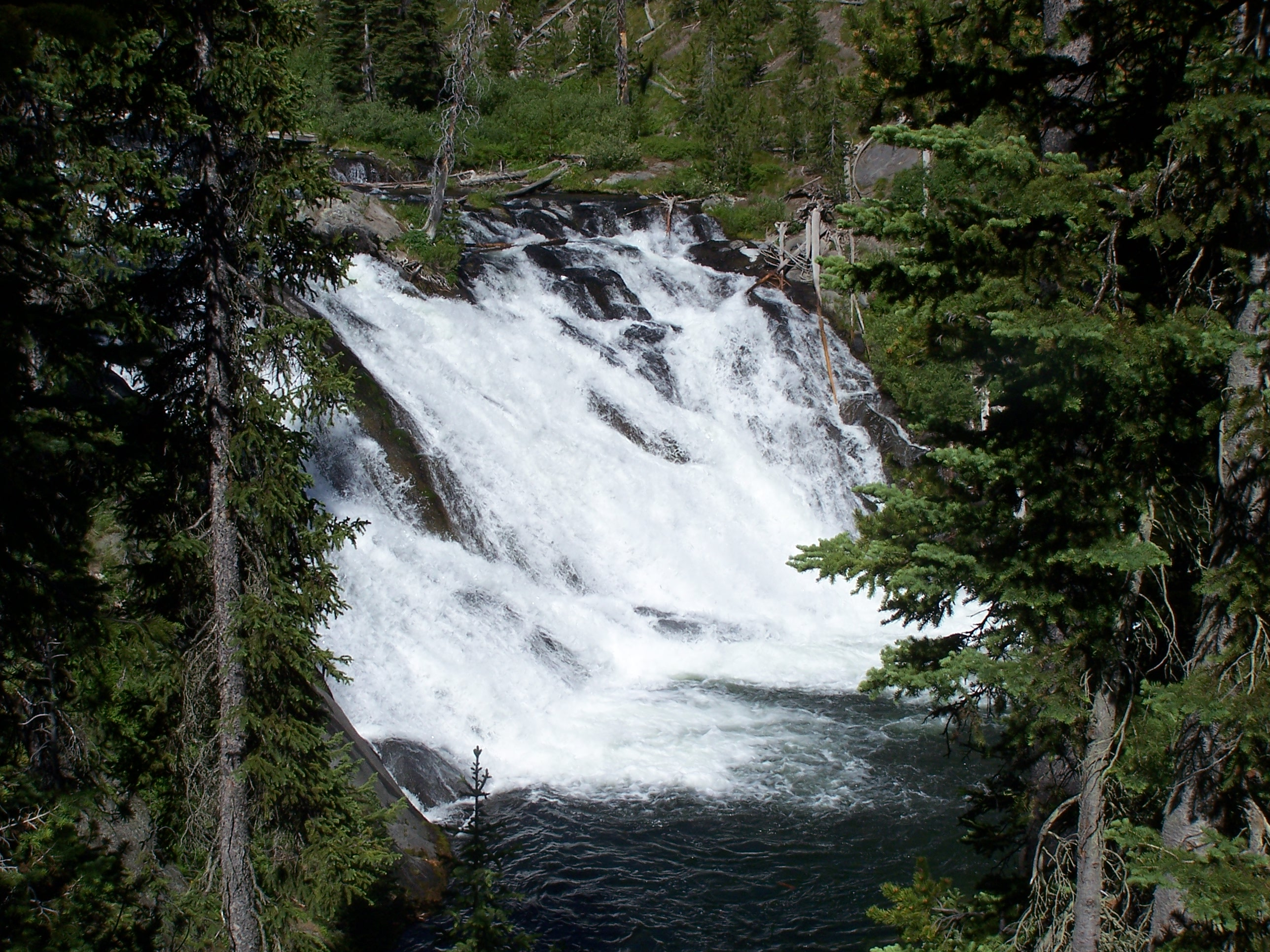
Side view

== See also ==
- Waterfalls in Yellowstone National Park
