= Lewis River (Wyoming) =

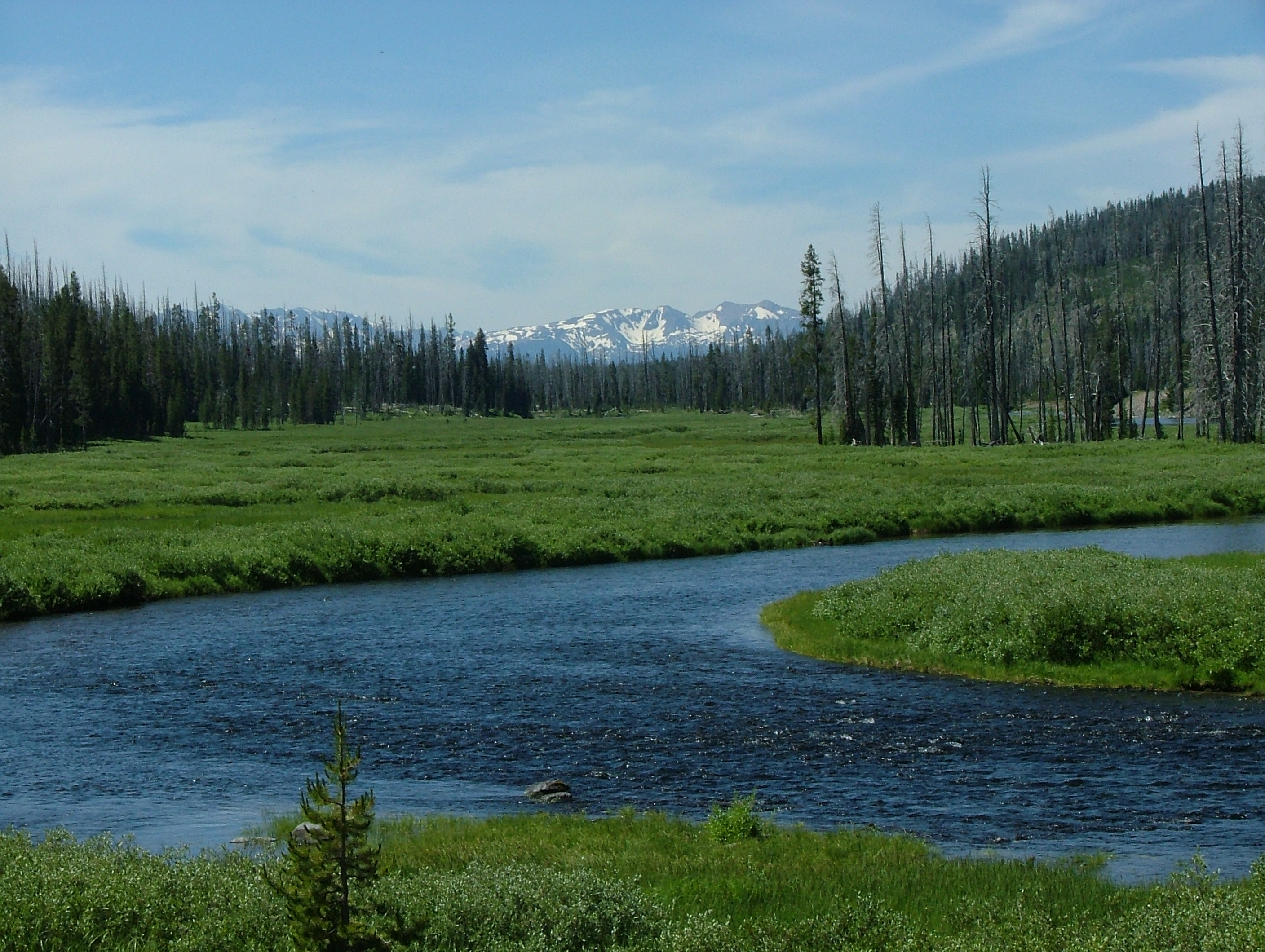

Location
- Country: United States
- State: Wyoming

Physical characteristics
- Source
  - location: Shoshone Lake, Yellowstone National Park, Wyoming
  - coordinates: 44°21′19″N 110°39′54″W
- Mouth: Snake River
  - location: Yellowstone National Park, Wyoming
  - coordinates: 44°08′32″N 110°39′49″W
- Length: 18 mi (29 km)

National Wild and Scenic River
- Type: Wild, Scenic
- Designated: March 30, 2009

The Lewis River is an 18.1-mile-long (29.1 km) tributary of the Snake River. The entire course of the river is located within the boundaries of Yellowstone National Park in Wyoming, US. The river is named for Meriwether Lewis, commander of the Lewis and Clark Expedition.

The river was added to the National Wild and Scenic Rivers System on March 30, 2009, when President Barack Obama signed the Omnibus Public Land Management Act of 2009; five miles of the river from Shoshone Lake to Lewis Lake were classified as wild, and 12 miles from the outlet at Lewis Lake to the confluence with the Snake River were classified as scenic.

== River course ==
The Lewis River begins at the southern end of Shoshone Lake and flows southerly approximately 3 miles (5 km) to Lewis Lake. This short stretch of the river is the only portion of the river where boating is permitted. The river reemerges at the southern end of Lewis Lake and flows in a general southerly direction through a steep canyon roughly paralleling the south entrance road toward the south entrance of the park. Below Lewis Lake, the river passes over several cascades and waterfalls, including Lewis Falls. Shortly before leaving the park, the Lewis River merges with the Snake River, changing the course of the Snake southward. The Snake soon flows out of Yellowstone into Grand Teton National Park and Jackson Lake.

== Gallery ==
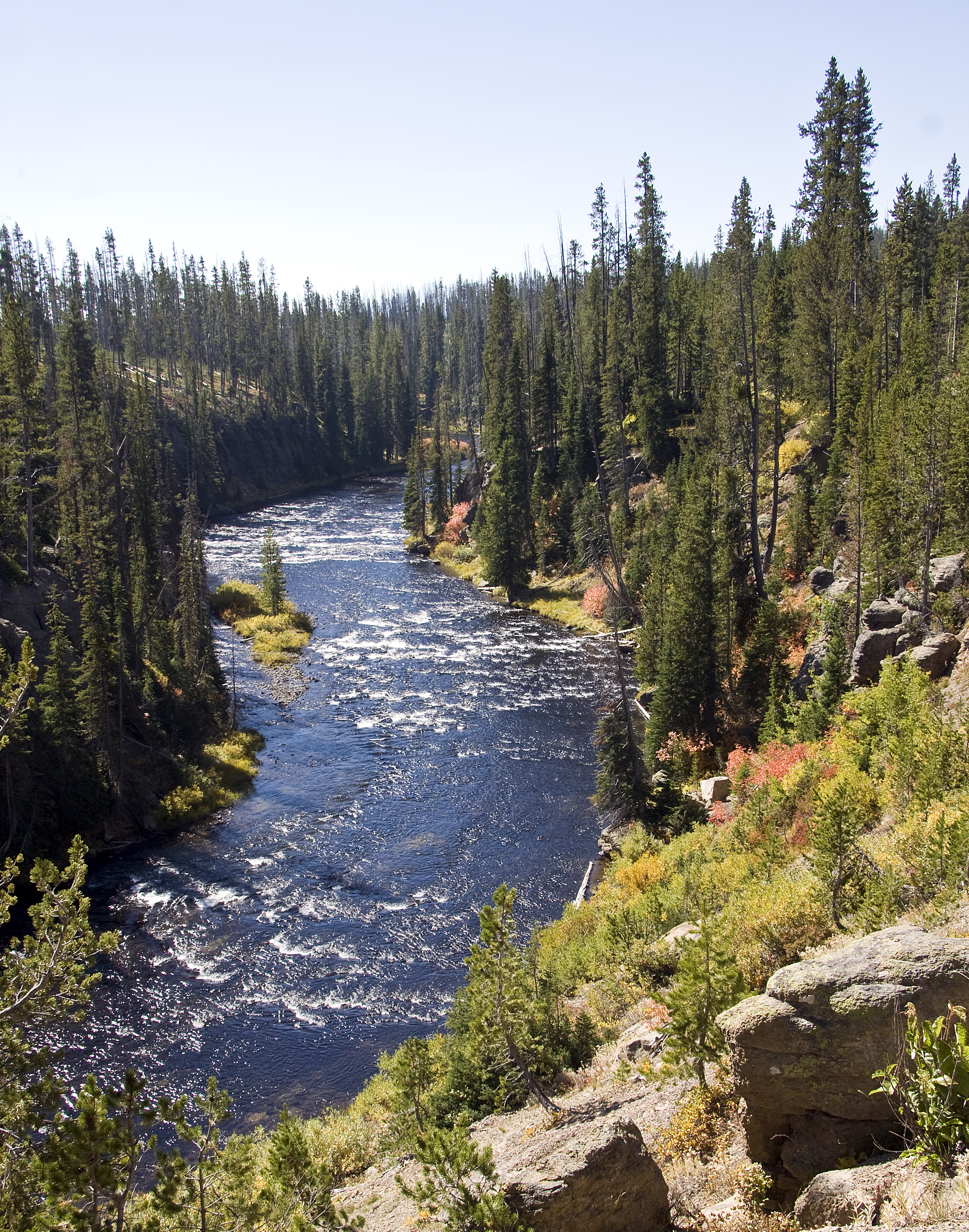
Lewis River

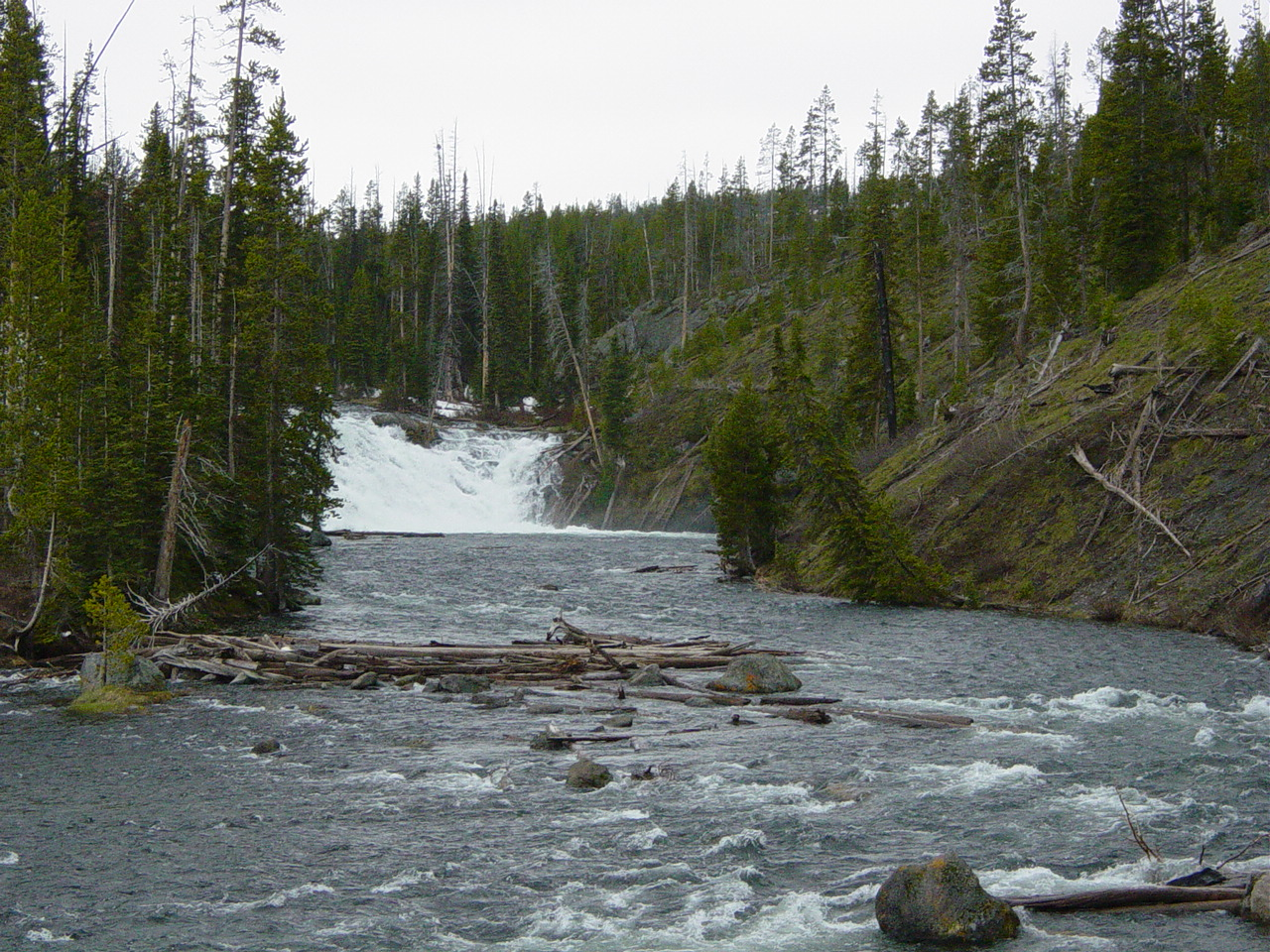
Lewis Falls

== See also ==
- Fishes of Yellowstone National Park
- Heart River
