= Float tube =

Small boat for anglers

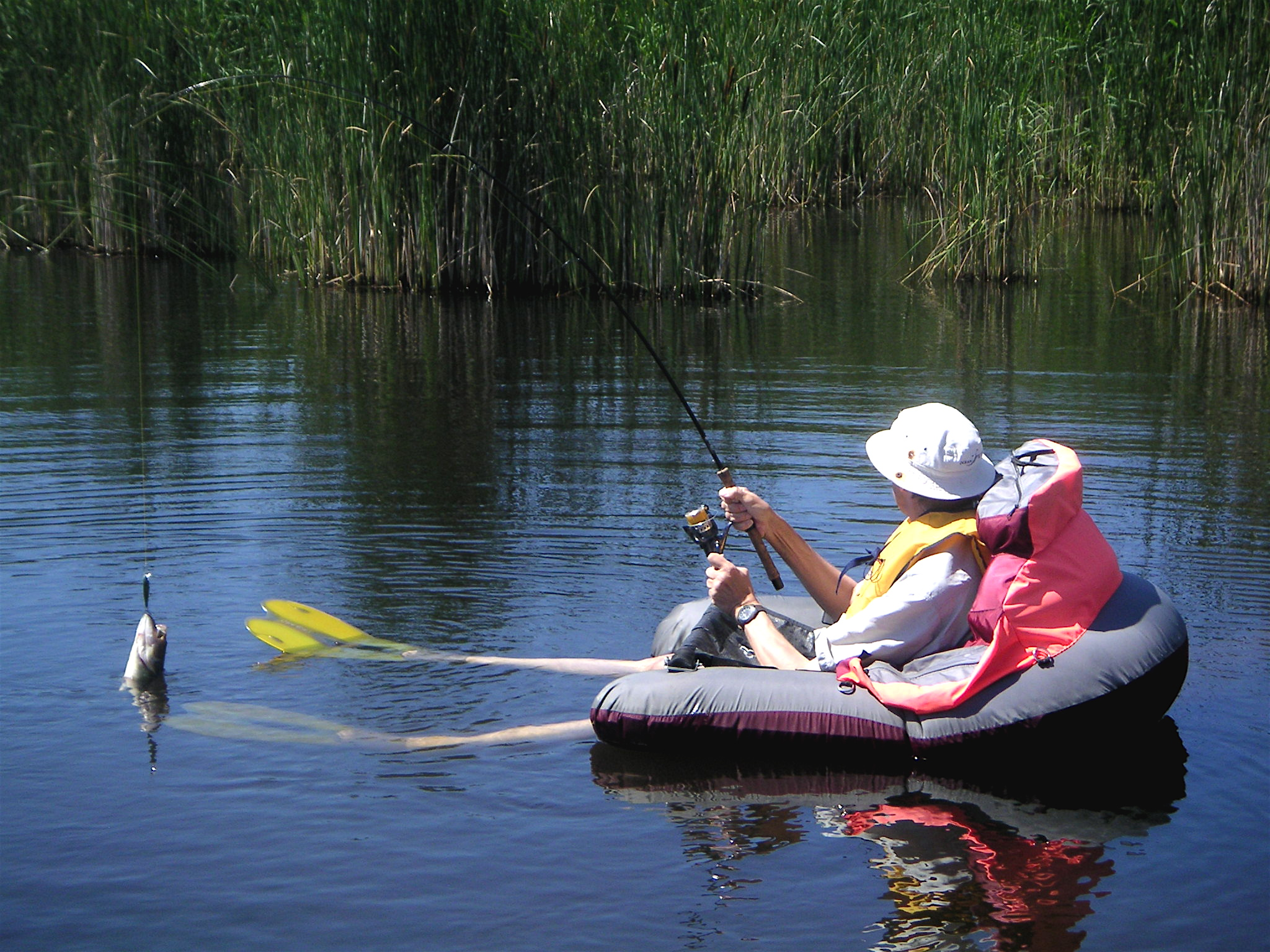
An angler in a float tube catching a black bass

A float tube, also known as a belly boat or kick boat, is a small, lightweight inflatable fishing craft which anglers use to fish from. They were originally doughnut-shaped boats with an underwater seat in the "hole." Modern designs include a V-shape with pontoons on either side and the seat raised above the water allowing the legs of the angler to be the only part of the body to be submerged. Float tubes are used for many aspects of fishing, such as flyfishing for trout or lure fishing for largemouth bass, and enable the angler to fish areas otherwise not fishable from the bank.

Float tubes are either U-, V-shaped, or circular. A standard float tube consists of an inflated bladder inside a sewn cover providing the seat, reserve air compartments, and tackle storage pockets. Many float tube anglers customize their crafts with rod holders, lights, and electronic fish finders.

== Details ==
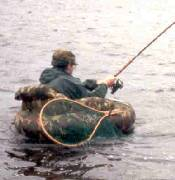
Playing a pike

The angler generally wears stockingfoot chest waders so the legs remain dry. Scuba diving-style flippers are used to provide propulsion. Seated in the float tube, the angler paddles across the water with a gentle movement of the flippers then remains still over the chosen fishing ground.

An alternative to diving flippers is the "paddle-pusher" or "duck fins." These fins strap onto the angler's feet and have paddles situated on the outsides of the ankles. The paddles fold back when the leg moves forward and open when the leg moves back, allowing anglers to move forward in a somewhat less efficient but more natural walking-type motion.

The competitive side of float tubing for bass is growing with the American Sonoma County Belly Boat Bass Club and The Bass Challenge in South Africa, which offers a tournament trail called the Kickboat Bass Challenge.

== Safety ==
Anglers fishing from a float tube may wear a personal flotation device (a requirement in some locations), as float tubes are susceptible to punctures. Additionally, most manufacturers do not recommend using float tubes in moving waters, such as rivers or streams.

== See also ==
- Bass fishing
- Bibliography of fly fishing
- Coarse fishing
