= Union Falls =

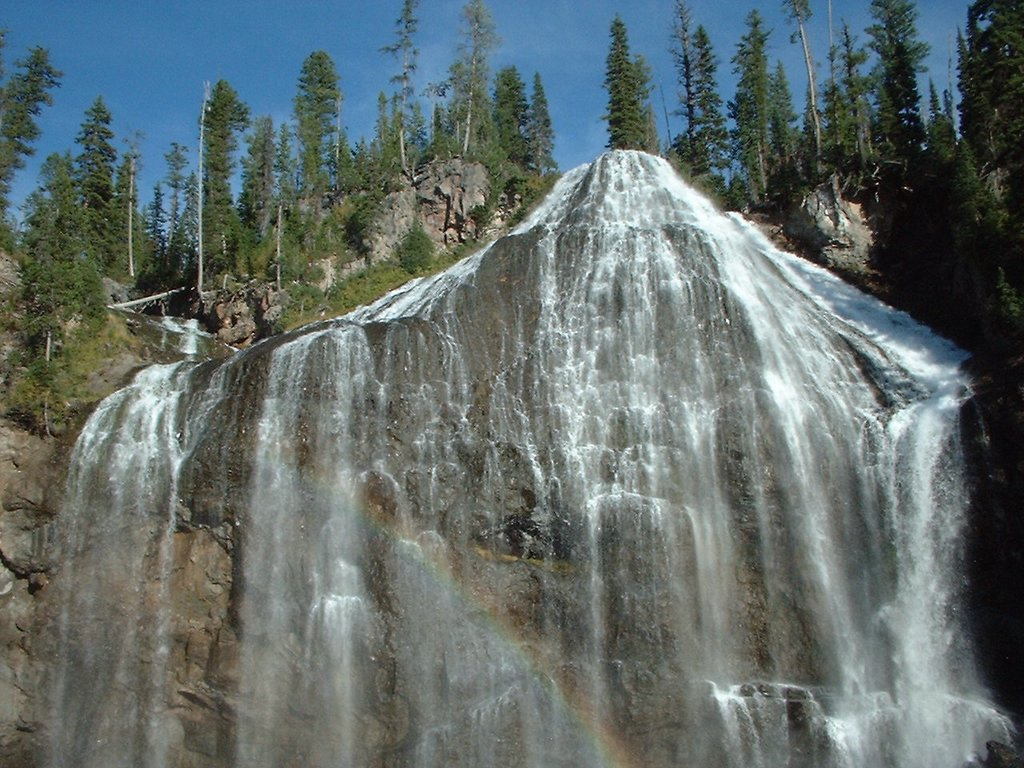
- Union Falls
- Interactive map of Union Falls
- Location: Yellowstone National Park, WY, US
- Coordinates: 44°11′34″N 110°52′15″W
- Type: Fan
- Total height: 250 feet (76 m)
- Number of drops: 1
- Watercourse: Mountain Ash Creek

Union Falls is a fan-type waterfall on Mountain Ash Creek, a tributary of the Fall River in the Cascade Corner (southwest) of Yellowstone National Park, in Wyoming, United States. With a height of 250 feet (76 m), it is the second tallest major waterfall in Yellowstone, exceeded only by the lower Yellowstone Falls. The falls was named by members of the Arnold Hague Geological Surveys sometime between 1884 and 1886. Geologist J.P. Iddings claims the name derives from the fact that a tributary of Mountain Ash Creek joins at the very brink of the falls, thus Union Falls. Access to the falls is via the Mountain Ash Creek trail and the Grassy Lake Road.

Images of Union Falls
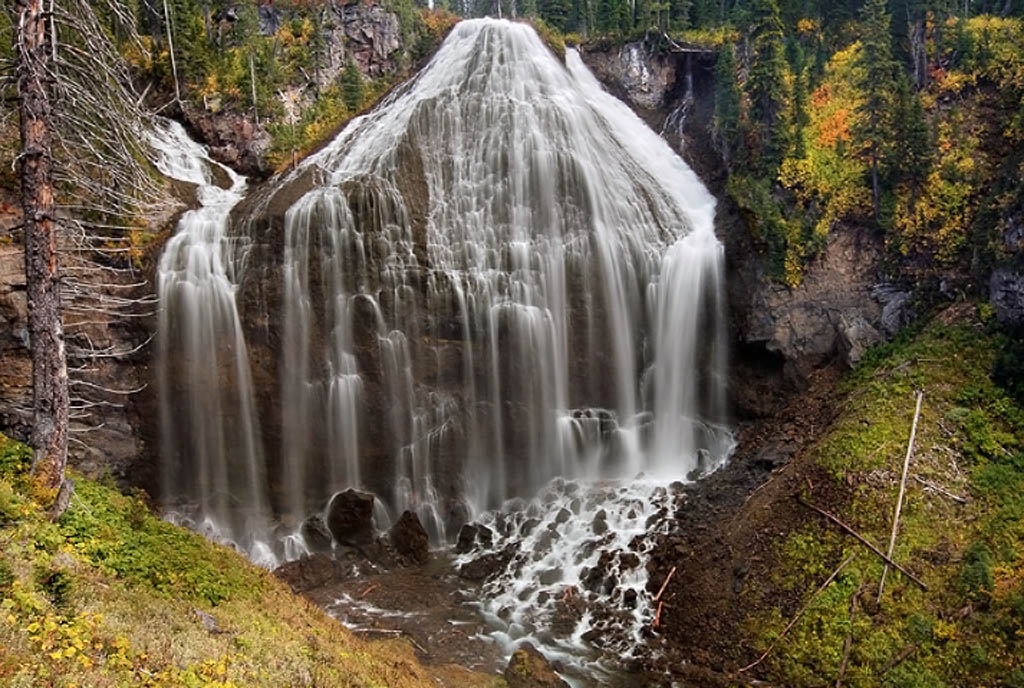
Union Falls in Autumn

== See also ==
- List of waterfalls
- List of waterfalls in Yellowstone National Park
