= Iris Falls =

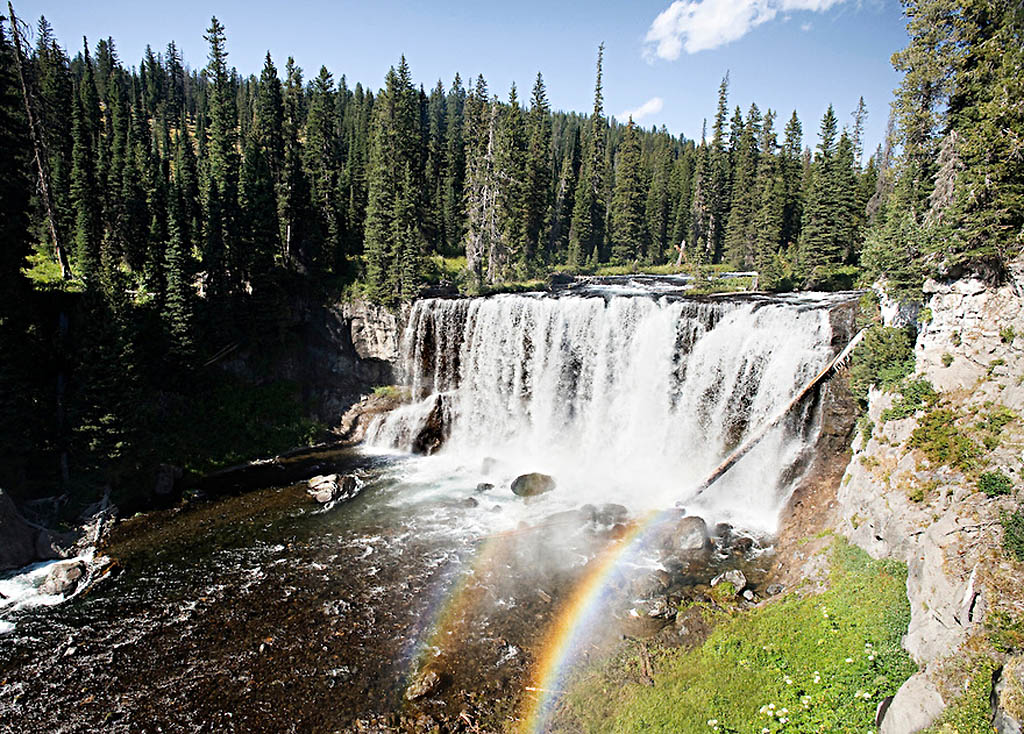
- 2001
- Interactive map of Iris Falls
- Location: Yellowstone National Park, Teton County, Wyoming
- Coordinates: 44°14′30″N 110°56′37″W
- Total height: 45 feet (14 m)
- Watercourse: Bechler River

Iris Falls (height 45 feet (14 m)) is a waterfall on the Bechler River in Yellowstone National Park. Iris Falls is located just upstream from Colonnade Falls and is accessible via the Bechler River Trail. The falls were named in 1885 by members of the Arnold Hague Geological Survey for Iris, the mythological Greek goddess of the rainbow.

== See also ==
- Waterfalls in Yellowstone National Park
