= List of waterfalls in Yellowstone National Park =

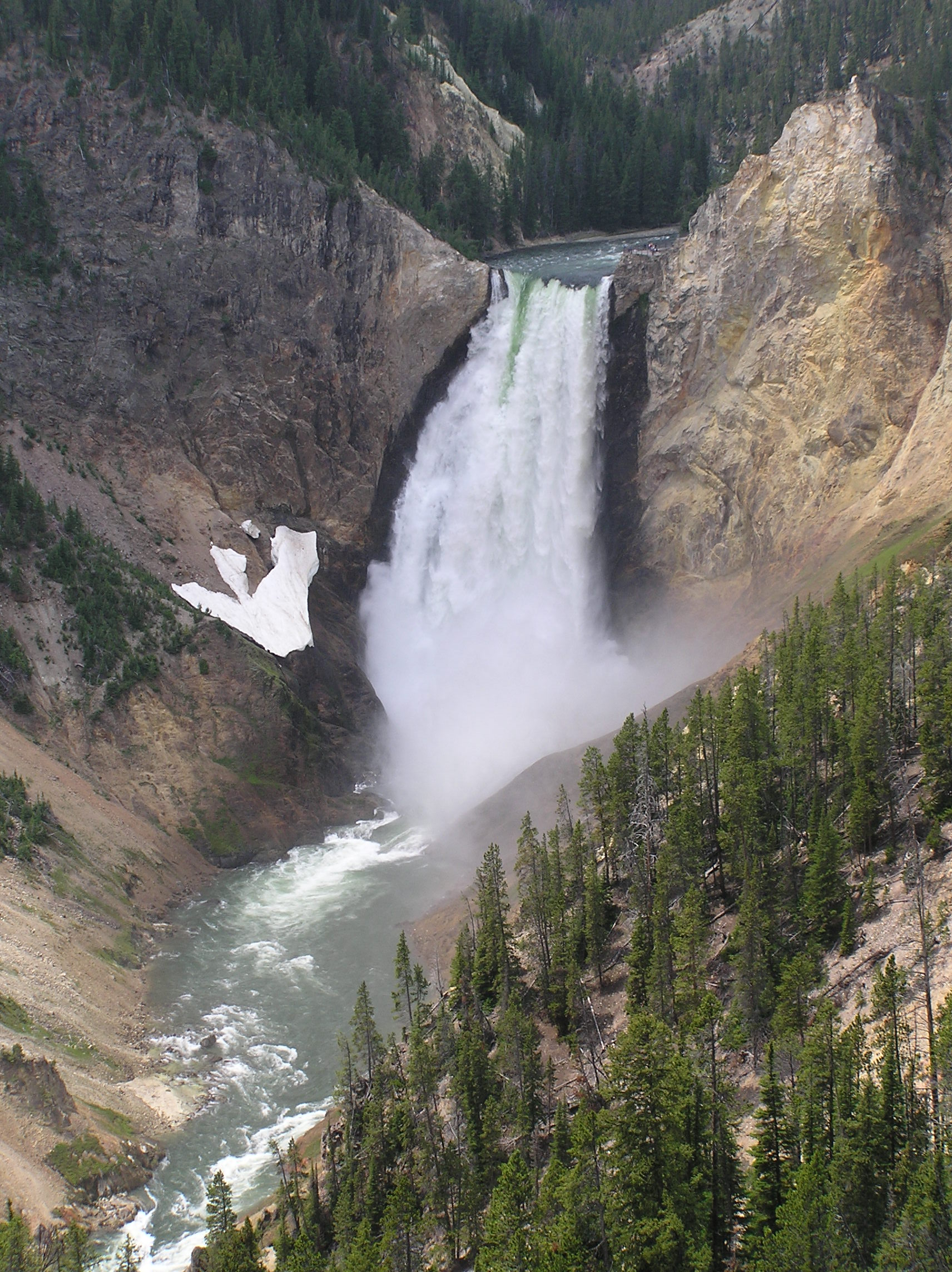
Lower Falls of the Yellowstone River

Yellowstone National Park contains at least 45 officially named waterfalls and cascades, and hundreds more unofficially named or even undiscovered waterfalls over 15 feet (4.6 m) high. The highest plunge type waterfall in the park is the Lower Falls of the Yellowstone River at 308 feet (94 m). The highest horsetail type is Silver Cord Cascade at 1,200 feet (370 m).

== Northwest quadrant ==
- Firehole Falls, 40 feet (12 m), Firehole River, 44°37′51″N 110°51′52″W
- Gibbon Falls, 84 feet (26 m), Gibbon River, 44°39′16″N 110°46′15″W
- Hidden Falls, 20 feet (6.1 m), Blacktail Deer Creek
- Little Gibbon Falls, 25 feet (7.6 m), Gibbon River
- Osprey Falls, 150 feet (46 m), Gardner River, 44°55′42″N 110°40′53″W
- Undine Falls, Lava Creek, 44°56′39″N 110°38′20″W
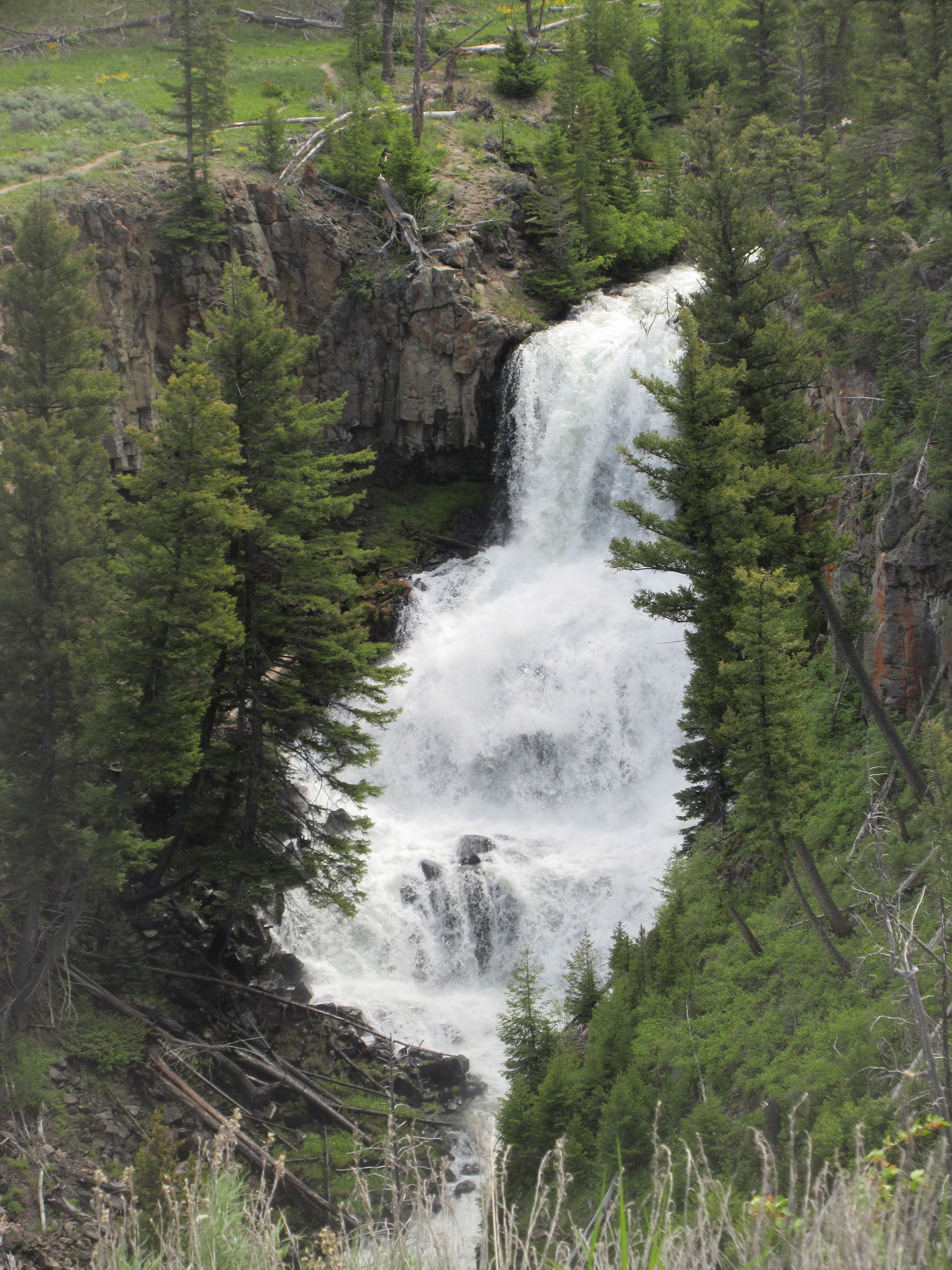
  Undine Falls
  - Upper 60 feet (18 m)
  - Lower 38 feet (12 m)
- Rustic Falls, 47 feet (14 m), Glen Creek, 44°56′03″N 110°43′33″W
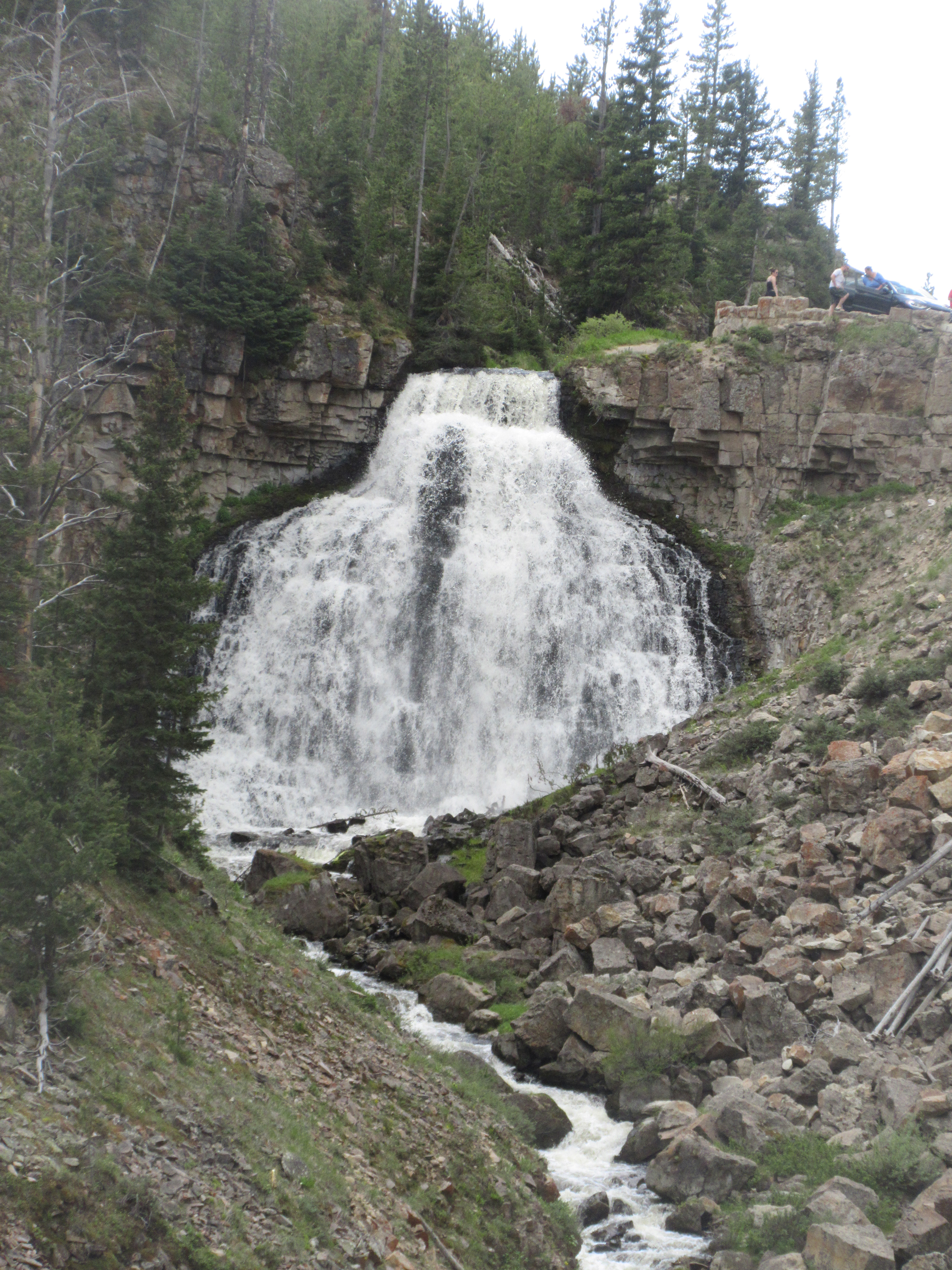
  Rustic Falls
- Silver Cascades, 80 feet (24 m), Stephans Creek
- Virginia Cascades, 60 feet (18 m), Gibbon River, 44°42′47″N 110°38′46″W
- Wraith Falls, 100 feet (30 m), Lupine Creek, 44°56′14″N 110°37′25″W
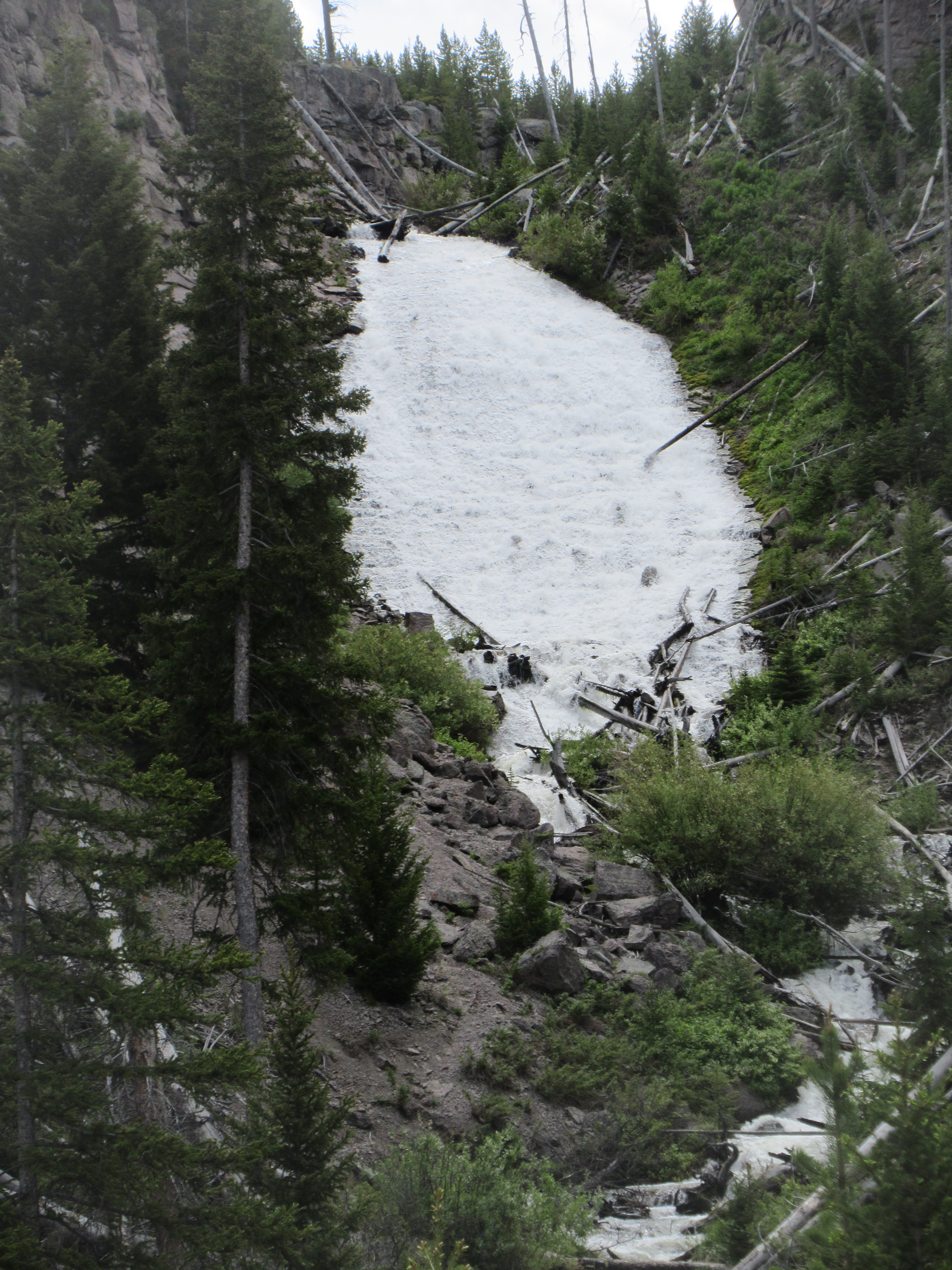
  Wraith Falls

== Northeast quadrant ==
- Birdseye Falls
- Citadel of Asgard Falls, 150 feet (46 m), Mystery Creek
- Crystal Falls, 129 feet (39 m), Cascade Creek, 44°43′05″N 110°30′03″W
- Enchantress Falls, 90 feet (27 m), Beauty Creek
- Faires' Fall, Amethyst Creek
- Knowles Falls, 15 feet (4.6 m), Yellowstone River, 45°00′42″N 110°35′41″W
- Silver Cord Cascade, 1,200 feet (370 m), Surface Creek, 44°43′34″N 110°27′06″W
- Tower Fall, 132 feet (40 m), Tower Creek
- Yellowstone Falls, Yellowstone River
  - Upper Falls, 109 feet (33 m), 44°42′46″N 110°29′58″W
  - Lower Falls, 308 feet (94 m), 44°43′05″N 110°29′46″W

== Southwest quadrant ==
- Albright Falls, 260 feet (79 m), Bechler River, 44°16′40″N 110°54′13″W
- Cave Falls, 20 feet (6.1 m), Fall River, 44°08′41″N 110°59′50″W
- Bechler Falls, 15 feet (4.6 m), Bechler River, 44°08′57″N 111°00′36″W
- Cascades of the Firehole, 40 feet (12 m), Firehole River, 44°36′59″N 110°51′20″W
- Chasm Falls, Ouzel Creek
- Childhood's Dream Falls, 30 feet (9.1 m), Ouzel Creek
- Colonnade Falls, Bechler River, 44°14′19″N 110°56′53″W
  - Upper 35 feet (11 m)
  - Lower 67 feet (20 m)
- Dunanda Falls, 150 feet (46 m), Boundary Creek, 44°14′52″N 111°01′27″W
- Emerald Pool Falls, Ouzel Creek
- Fairy Falls, 197 feet (60 m), Fairy Creek, 44°31′28″N 110°52′16″W
- Fern Cascades, 50 feet (15 m), Iron Spring Creek, 44°26′46″N 110°50′39″W
- Gwinna Falls, 15 feet (4.6 m), Bechler River, 44°16′55″N 110°52′49″W
- Hourglass Falls (see Quiver Cascade)
- Iris Falls, 45 feet (14 m), Bechler River, 44°14′30″N 110°56′37″W
- Kepler Cascades, 150 feet (46 m), Firehole River,44°26′45″N 110°48′26″W
- Lewis Canyon Falls, Lewis River
  - Upper Falls, 80 feet (24 m)
  - Lower Falls, 50 feet (15 m)
- Lewis Falls, 30 feet (9.1 m), Lewis River, 44°16′02″N 110°38′15″W
- Lily Falls, 15 feet (4.6 m), Unnamed Creek, 44°12′58.80″N 110°39′25.17″W
- Moose Falls, 30 feet (9.1 m), Crawfish Creek, 44°09′08″N 110°40′20″W
- Morning Falls, Ash Mountain Creek
- Mystic Falls, 70 feet (21 m), Little Firehole River, 44°29′03″N 110°52′26″W
- Ouzel Falls, 230 feet (70 m), Ouzel Creek, 44°14′06″N 110°58′33″W
- Quiver Cascade, 98 feet (30 m), Bechler River, 44°18′18″N 110°52′53″W
- Ragged Falls, 45 feet (14 m), Bechler River, 44°17′17″N 110°53′24″W
- Rainbow Falls, 55 feet (17 m), Fall River
- Silver Scarf Falls, 250 feet (76 m), East Fork Boundary Creek, 44°08′50″N 110°51′51″W
- Tempe Cascade, 30 feet (9.1 m), Bechler River, 44°14′48.65″N 111°1′16.73″W
- Terraced Falls, 130 feet (40 m), Fall River, 44°08′50″N 110°51′51″W
- Tendoy Falls, 33 feet (10 m), Bechler River, Ferris Fork, 44°08′50″N 110°51′51″W
- "Treasure Falls", "Lilliputian Creek" (Treasure Island of the Bechler River)
- Twister Falls, 55 feet (17 m), Bechler River, 44°17′52″N 110°52′43″W
- Union Falls, 250 feet (76 m), Mountain Ash Creek, 44°11′34″N 110°52′15″W
- Wahhi Falls, Bechler River, 44°16′31″N 110°52′40″W
  - Upper 28 feet (8.5 m)
  - Lower 18 feet (5.5 m)

== Southeast quadrant ==
- Crecelius Cascade, 75 feet (23 m), Eleanor Lake

== See also ==
- List of waterfalls
