= Mystic Falls =

Waterfall in Teton County, Wyoming, United States

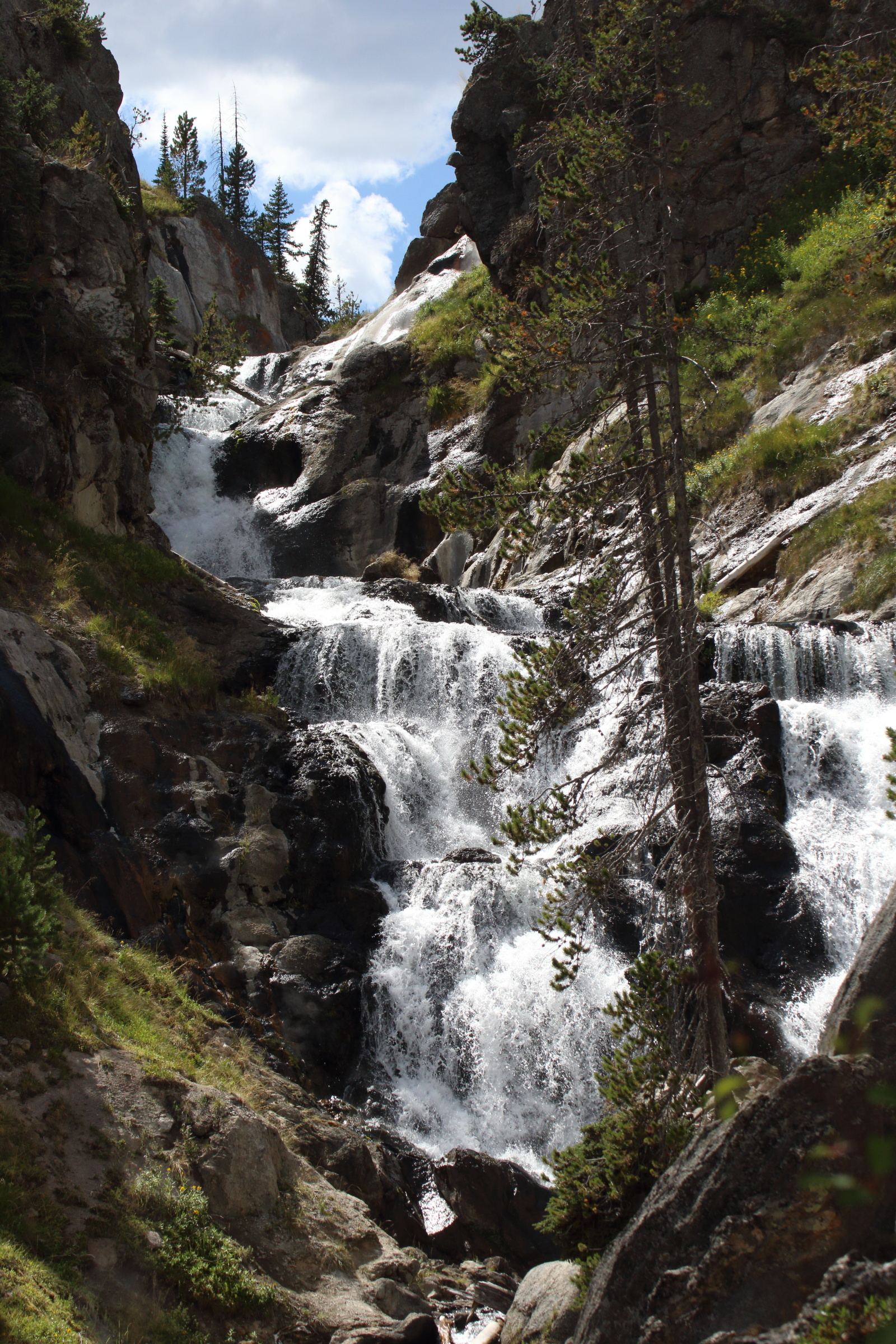
- Mystic Falls
- Interactive map of Mystic Falls
- Location: Yellowstone National Park, Teton County, Wyoming
- Coordinates: 44°29′03″N 110°52′26″W
- Type: Cascade
- Total height: 70 feet (21 m)
- Watercourse: Little Firehole River

Mystic Falls is a 70-foot (21 m) cascade type waterfall on the Little Firehole River, a tributary of the Firehole River in Yellowstone National Park.

Originally named Little Firehole Falls by members of the 1872 Hayden Geologic Survey, the name was changed to Mystic Falls by members of the Arnold Hague Geological Survey in 1885 for unknown reasons. Mystic Falls is reached via the 1.2 miles (1.9 km) Mystic Falls Trail which starts at Biscuit Basin in the Upper Geyser Basin.

== Gallery ==
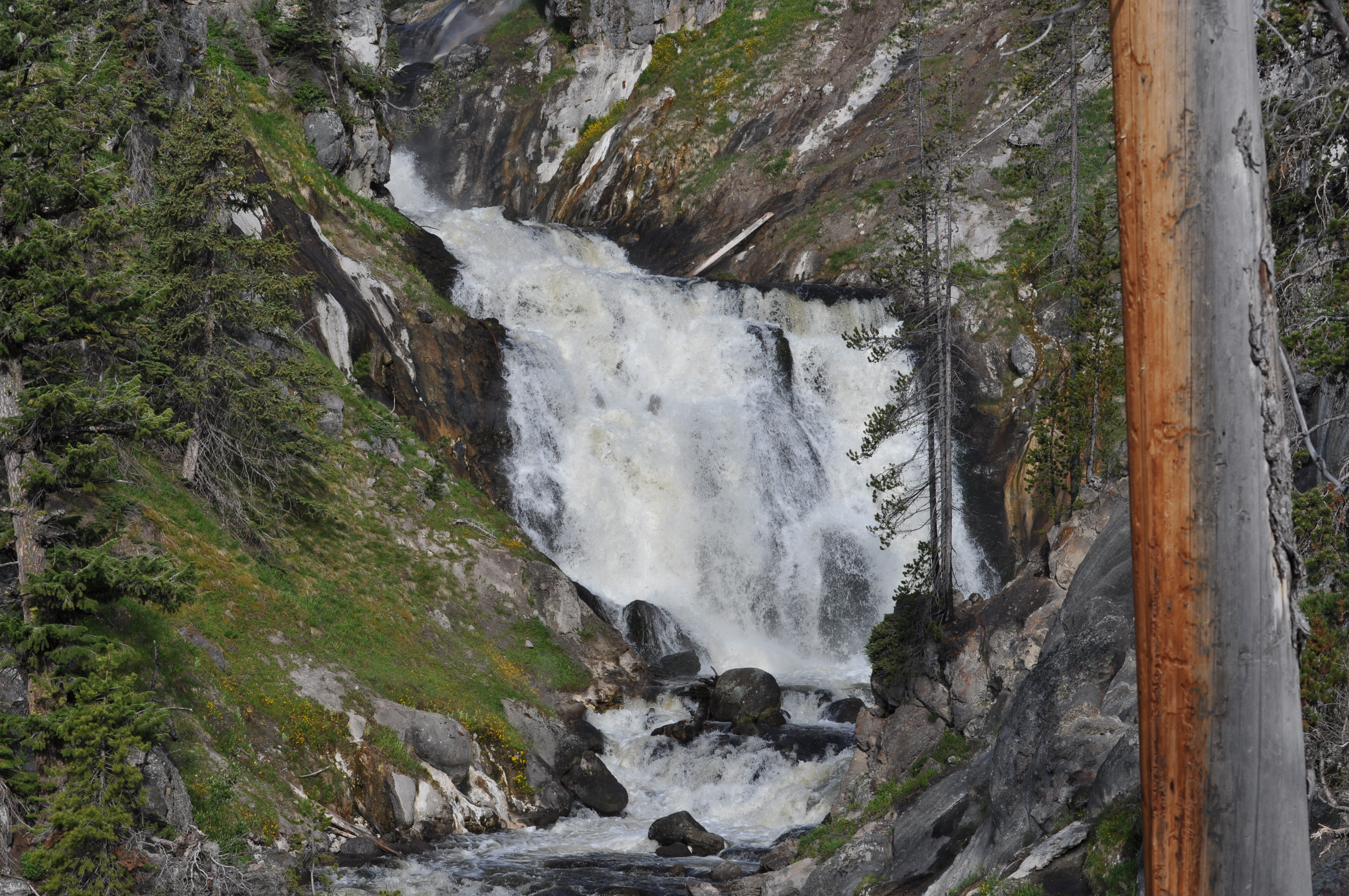
Spring runoff, June 2011

== See also ==
- Trails of Yellowstone National Park
- Waterfalls in Yellowstone National Park
