= Silver Cord Cascade =

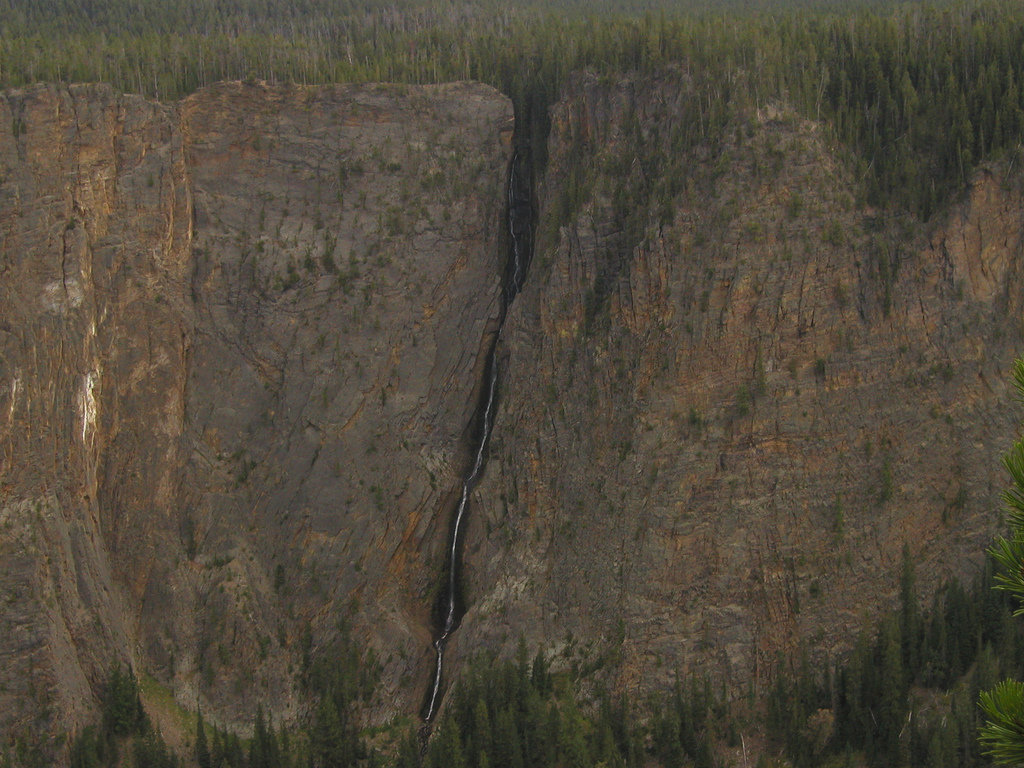

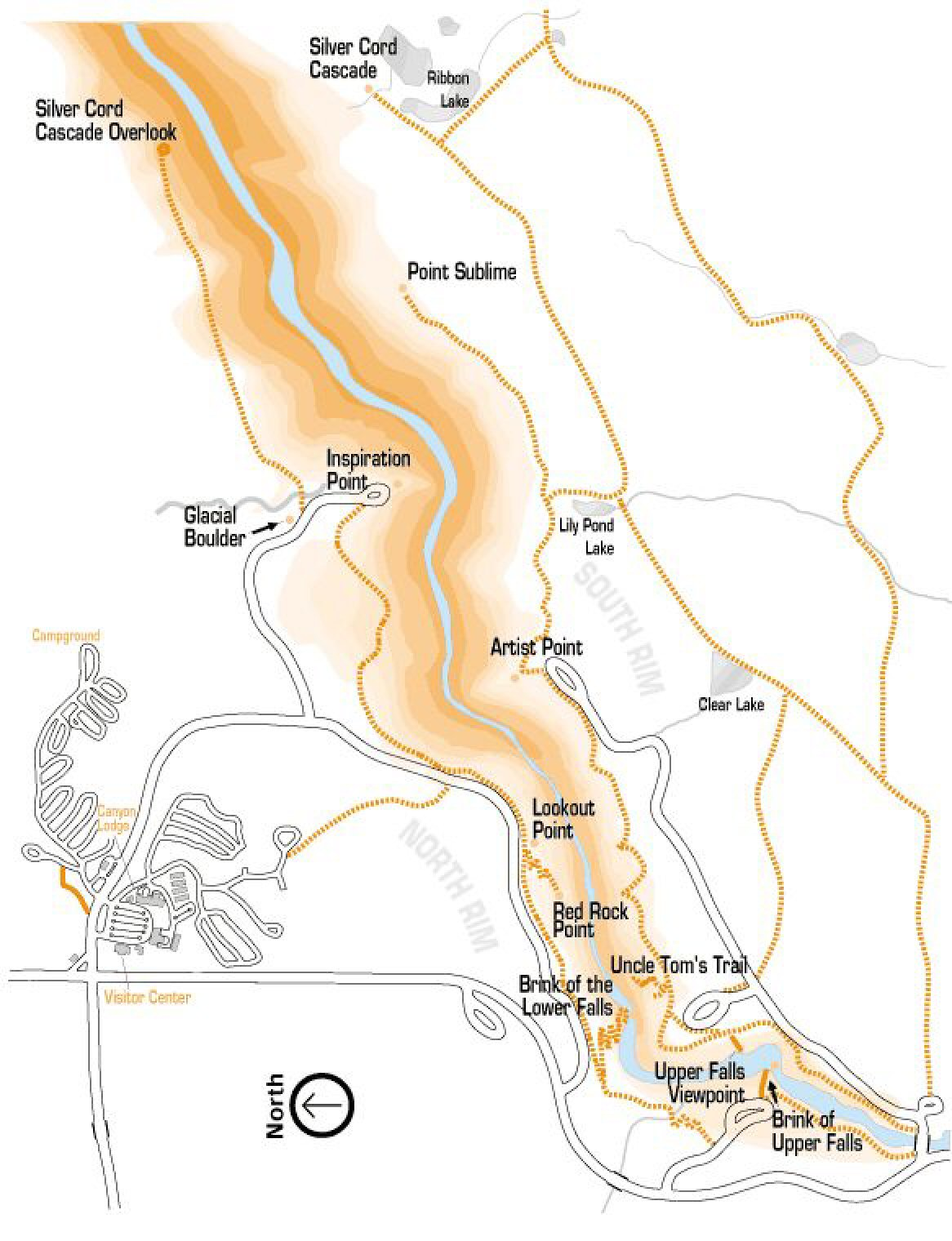
- Interactive map of Silver Cord Cascade
- Location: Park County, Wyoming, Yellowstone National Park
- Coordinates: 44°43′34″N 110°27′06″W
- Type: Horsetail
- Elevation: 7,861 feet (2,396 m)
- Total height: 1,200 feet (370 m)
- Watercourse: Surface Creek

Silver Cord Cascade is a horsetail type waterfall on Surface Creek, a tributary of the Yellowstone River in Yellowstone National Park. Surface Creek flows out of Ribbon Lake off the South rim of the Grand Canyon of the Yellowstone and plunges 1,200 feet (370 m) to the Yellowstone River. It is considered the tallest waterfall in Yellowstone.

Silver Cord Cascade was first described by members of the Washburn–Langford–Doane Expedition as Silverthread Falls.

the wild, floating stories about falls 1,000 feet in height are no doubt exaggerations as applied to the main stream. That there are small streams...that fall the distance of 1,000 feet or more, perpendicular, is true and such were seen by some of our party.

— Cornelius Hedges, 1870

Samuel Hauser and Benjamin Stickney, members of the Washburn Expedition are credited with the name Silverthread Falls. In 1883, Philetus Norris, then park superintendent, renamed the falls Sliding Cascade. However, in 1885 the official name, Silver Cord Cascade, was bestowed on the falls by the Arnold Hague Geological Survey.

The brink of the falls can be reached via the Clear Lake-Ribbon Lake trail, while the falls can be viewed from the North rim of the canyon off the Sevenmile Hole trail.

== See also ==
- List of waterfalls
- Waterfalls in Yellowstone National Park
