= Central Plateau =

Central Plateau may refer to:

== Places ==
- Central Plateau of Angola, another name for the Bié Plateau
- Central Plateau (Brazil), in the Brazilian Highlands
- Central Plateau (Haiti)
- Central Plateau (Mexico)
- Central Plateau (New Zealand)
- Central Plateau (United States), a plateau in Yellowstone National Park, Wyoming
- Central Plateau Conservation Area, an animal and plant conservation area in Tasmania, Australia
- Central Highlands (Madagascar), also known as the Central High Plateau
- Central Siberian Plateau
- Plateau State, Nigeria
- Swiss Plateau

== Other uses ==
- Central Plateau languages, a group of Plateau languages of Nigeria
