= Plateaus of Yellowstone National Park =

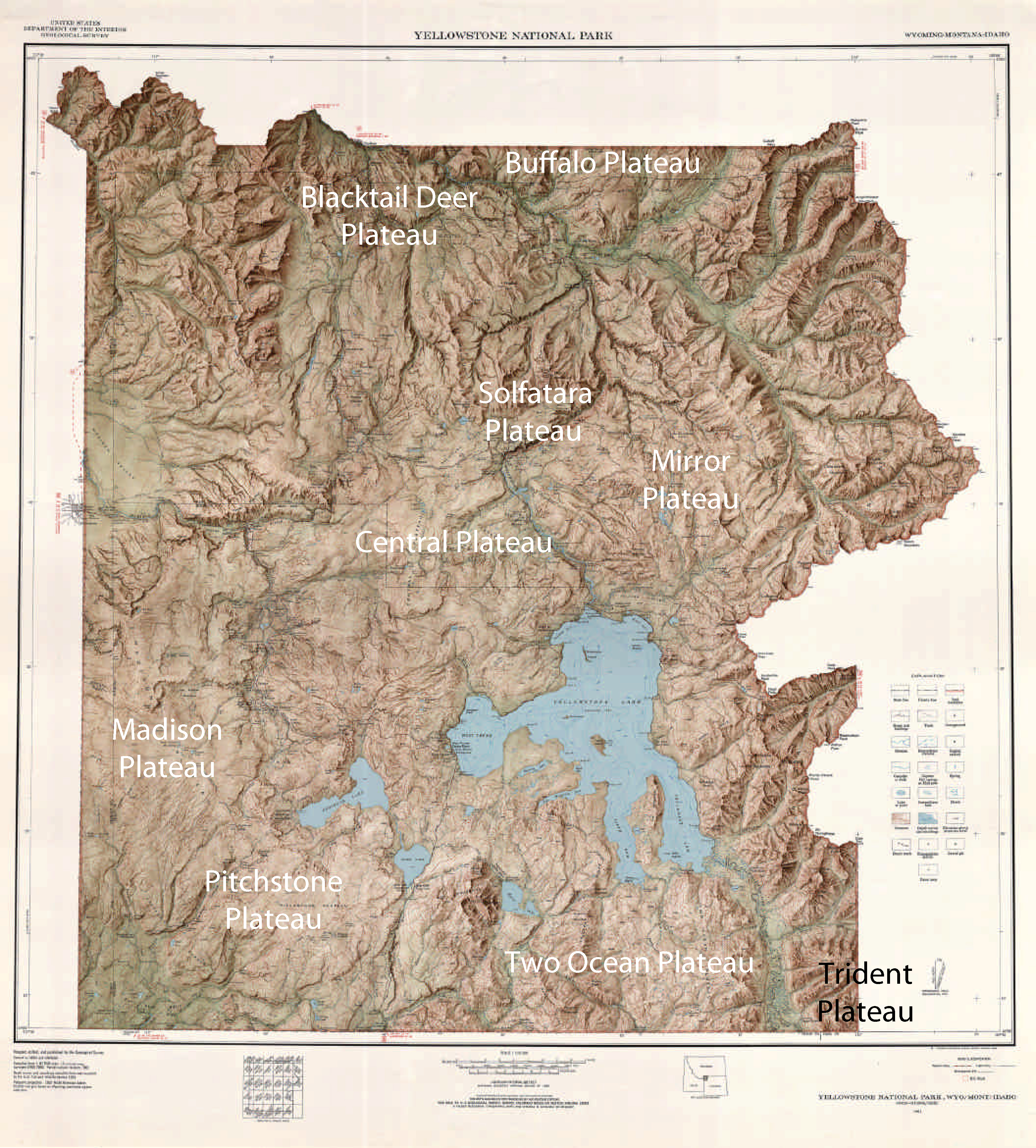
Relief map of Yellowstone showing location of plateaus

There are nine named plateaus in Yellowstone National Park. These plateaus are part of the much larger Yellowstone Plateau and dominate areas in the park south and west of the Gallatin and Absaroka mountain ranges. Four of the plateaus are from rhyolite lava flows that occurred between 110,000 and 70,000 years ago.

Gallatin Range as viewed from the Blacktail Deer Plateau
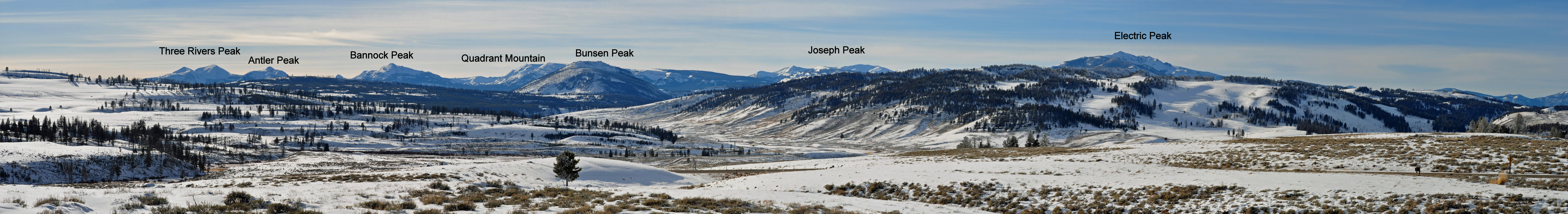
- Blacktail Deer Plateau 44°55′28″N 110°34′05″W, 7,113 feet (2,168 m)
  - Traversed by the Mammoth to Tower section of the Grand Loop Road, Blacktail Deer Plateau is one of the most accessible plateaus in the park. Blacktail Deer Plateau takes its name from Blacktail Deer Creek which flows off the plateau. Named by prospectors well before the park's creation in 1872, the name is probably attributable to the then prevalent Blacktail deer of the area.
- Buffalo Plateau 44°59′47″N 110°14′46″W, 8,251 feet (2,515 m)
  - The Buffalo Plateau straddles the Montana-Wyoming border north of the Lamar Valley and west of Slough Creek in the park's northern range. Named in 1870, before the park's creation, by prospectors Bart Henderson, James Gourley, Adam Miller and Ed Hibbard for the herds of Buffalo prevalent on the plateau. The plateau is traversed by the Buffalo Plateau trail on the west and the Buffalo Fork Trail on the east.
- Central Plateau 44°35′49″N 110°37′44″W, 8,399 feet (2,560 m)
  - The Central Plateau separates the Hayden Valley and Yellowstone River drainage on the east from the Lower Geyser Basin and the Madison River drainage on the west.
- Madison Plateau 44°21′02″N 110°58′18″W, 8,435 feet (2,571 m)
  - The Madison Plateau, the largest of the named plateaus, lies south of the Madison River and west of the Upper and Lower Geyser Basins. It extends south from the Madison River to the Continental Divide and west to the park border. The Plateau is virtually inaccessible because only one trail, the Summit Lake Trail, traverses the plateau east to west. The Fairy Creek Trail penetrates the eastern edge of the plateau on its way to Fairy Falls and Little Firehole Meadows.
- Mirror Plateau 44°43′55″N 110°07′32″W, 8,714 feet (2,656 m)
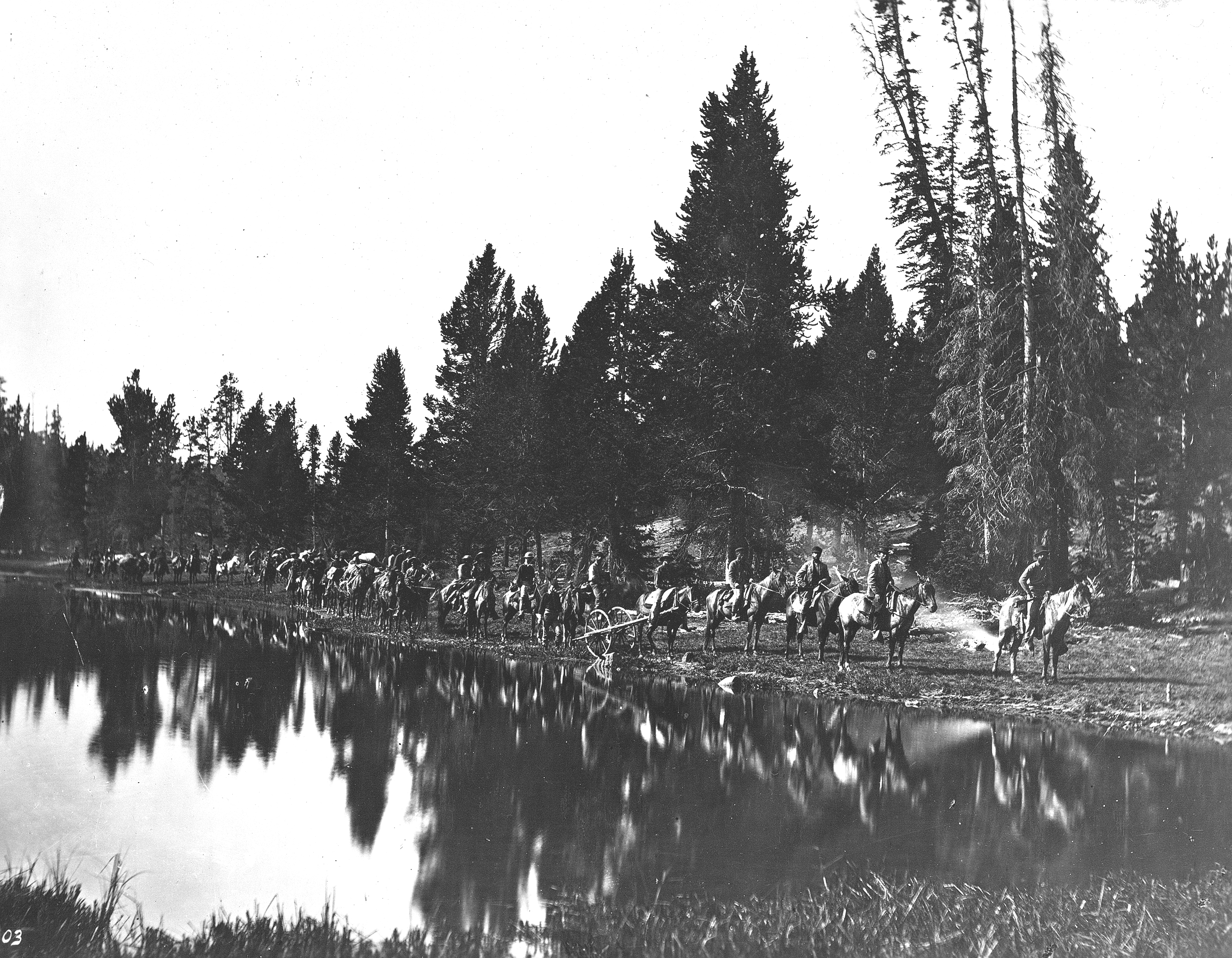
  One of the earliest photographs of Yellowstone occurred during the Hayden Geological Survey of 1871 at Mirror Lake on the Mirror Plateau. (Photo by William Henry Jackson, 1871)
  - The Mirror Plateau is a remote plateau west of the upper Lamar River and is in the headwaters of Pelican Creek which flows into Yellowstone Lake. The Plateau takes its name from Mirror Lake, originally named Divide Lake because it separates the Lamar and Pelican Creek drainages. During the 1878 Geological Survey, Ferdinand V. Hayden named this lake—Mirror Lake for its propensity to mirror or reflect the surrounding terrain.
- Pitchstone Plateau 44°15′11″N 110°46′24″W, 8,881 feet (2,707 m)
  - The Pitchstone Plateau, named after the lava pitchstone, occupies the southwest corner of the park in the Bechler and Fall River drainages. The rhyolite lava flows that created the plateau occurred about 70,000 years ago.
- Solfatara Plateau 44°43′53″N 110°32′45″W, 8,166 feet (2,489 m)
  - Solfatara is a small plateau in the headwaters of the Gibbon River. It lies just west of Canyon and south of Grebe Lake. It was named in 1883 by geologist Walter Weed for a solfatara, a thermal vent that emits hydrogen sulfide, steam and other gases. The Plateau is bounded by the Norris-Canyon road on the south and Wolf Lake-Cascade Lake trails on the north. The Grebe Lake trail crosses the center of the plateau.
- Trident Plateau 44°11′36″N 110°00′40″W, 10,649 feet (3,246 m)
  - Trident is a small, remote plateau in the southeast corner of park in the headwaters of the Yellowstone River east of The Trident. It extends east into the Teton National Forest in Wyoming. The Trident was named by geologist Arnold Hague in 1885 because it resembled a three pronged Trident.
- Two Ocean Plateau 44°10′33″N 110°12′59″W, 9,478 feet (2,889 m)
  - Two Ocean Plateau is named for the fact the Continental Divide crosses it, with precipitation on the plateau reaching either the Pacific Ocean or Gulf of Mexico. One creek flows south and eventually splits on the Divide at the Parting of the Waters.

== Gallery ==
Plateaus of Yellowstone National Park
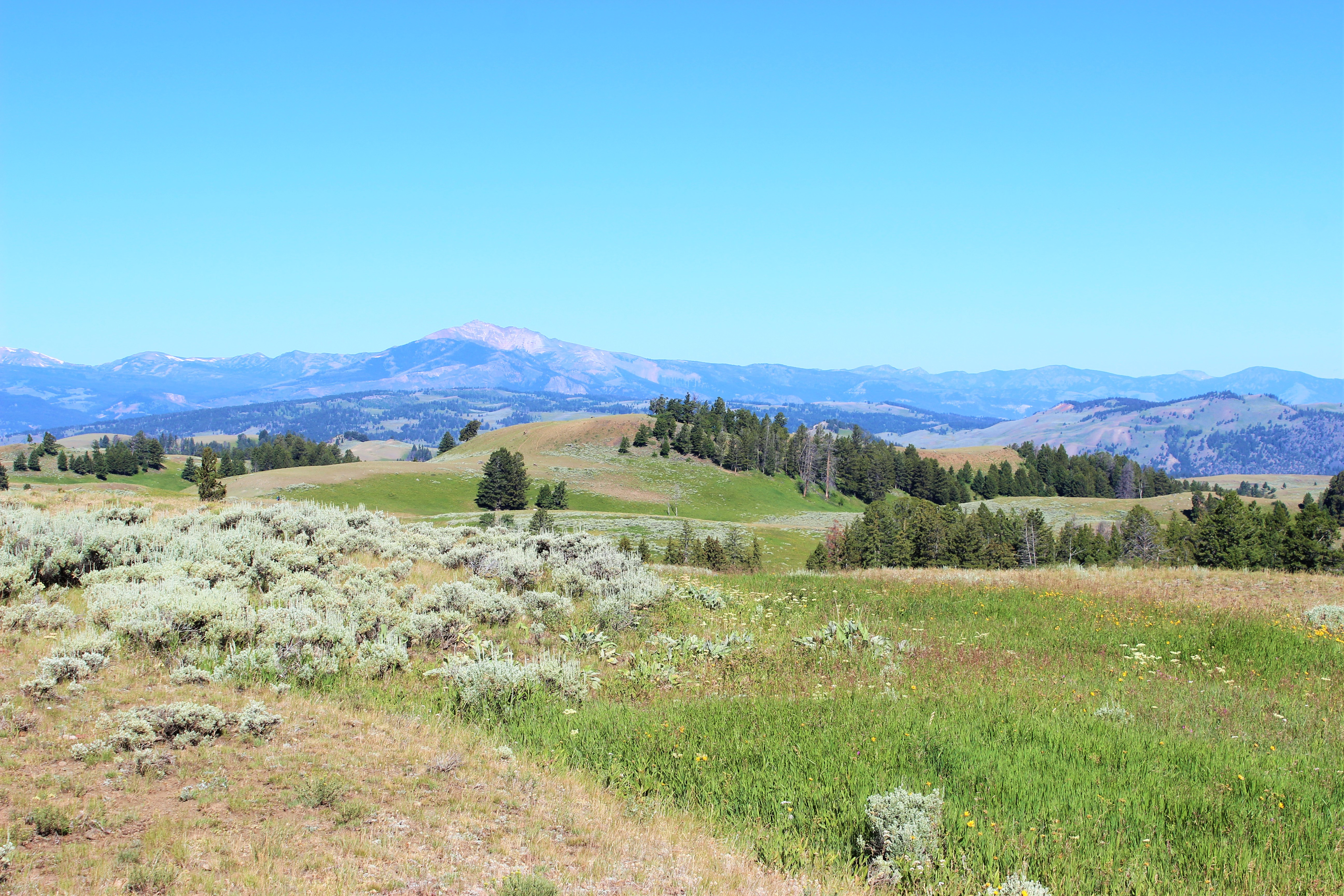
Blacktail Plateau

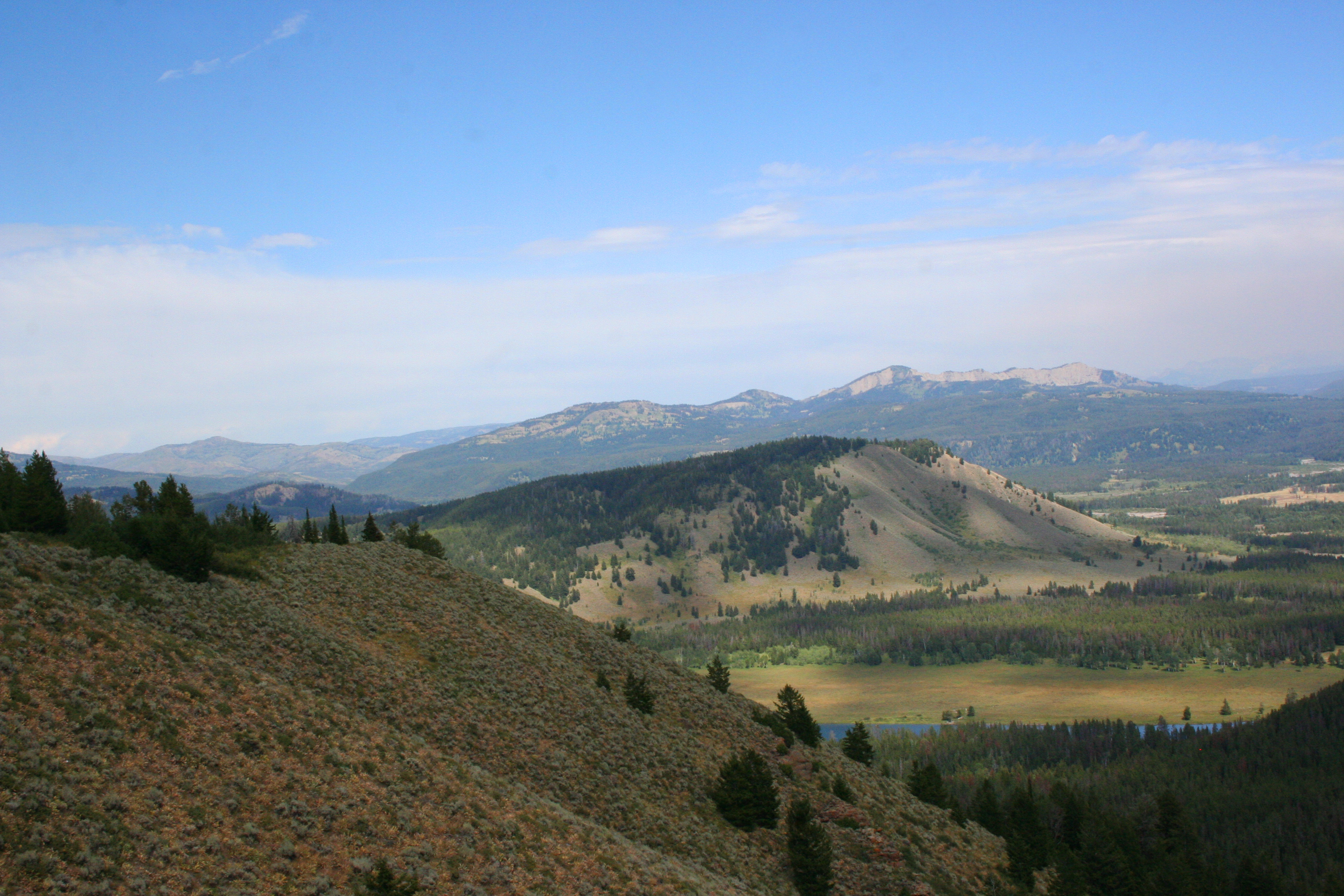
Pitchstone Plateau

== See also ==
- Mountains and mountain ranges of Yellowstone National Park
