= Trischman Knob =

Mountain in Wyoming, United States

Highest point
- Elevation: 8,573 ft (2,613 m)
- Coordinates: 44°20′22″N 110°52′39″W

Geography
- Location: Yellowstone National Park, Teton County, Wyoming, US
- Parent range: Madison Plateau

Trischman Knob el. 8,573 feet (2,613 m) is an isolated summit along the Continental Divide on the Madison Plateau in Yellowstone National Park. The summit is located approximately 1.5 miles (2.4 km) west of the Bechler River trail just south of Madison Lake, the source of the Firehole River. The summit was named in 1962 by Assistant Chief Ranger Willam S. Chapman for Harry Trischman (1886–1950). Trischman came to Yellowstone in 1899 with his parents. His father was the post carpenter at Fort Yellowstone. Trischman worked as a U.S. Army scout and in 1916 became one of the first park rangers. He worked as a ranger in Yellowstone until his retirement in 1945. Trischman Knob was one of his favorite backcountry haunts.

Images of Trischman Knob
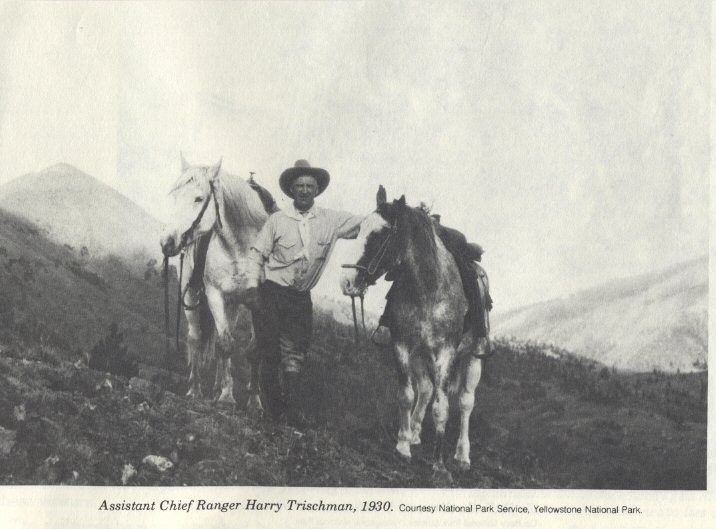
Trischman Knob's namesake, Harry Trischman, 1930

== See also ==
- Mountains and mountain ranges of Yellowstone National Park
