= Colonnade Falls =

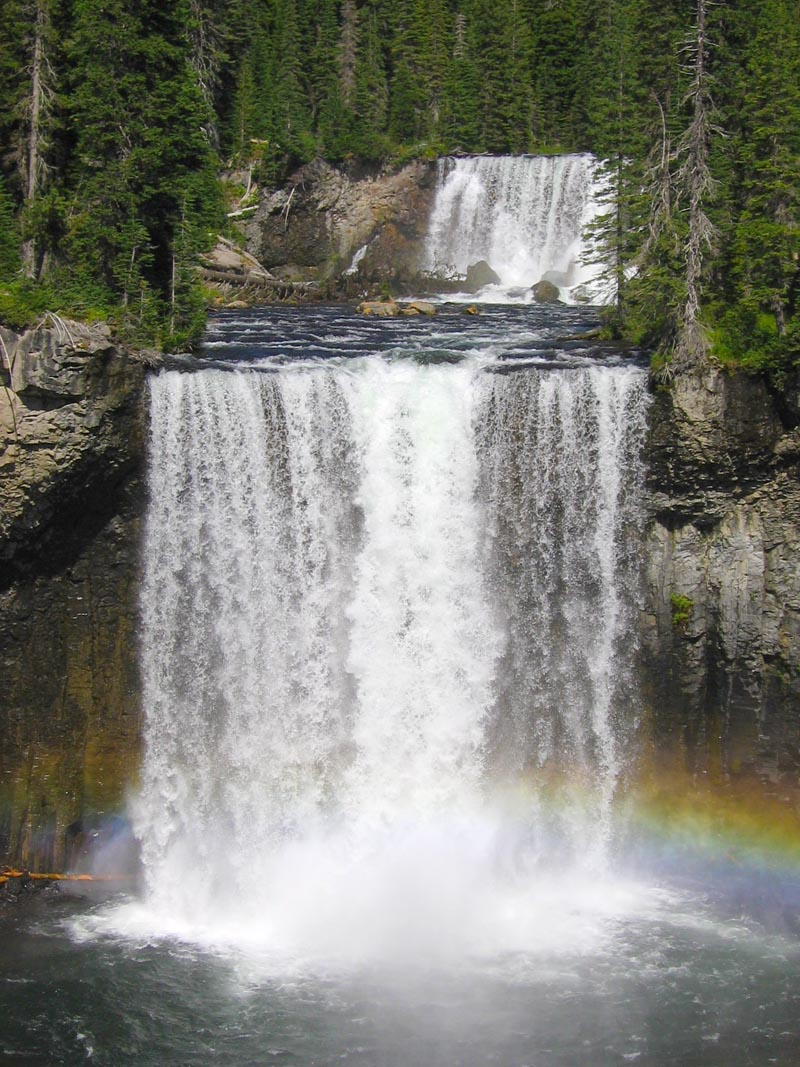
- 2001
- Interactive map of Colonnade Falls
- Location: Yellowstone National Park, Teton County, Wyoming
- Coordinates: 44°14′19″N 110°56′53″W
- Total height: Upper 35 feet (11 m), Lower 67 feet (20 m)
- Number of drops: 2
- Watercourse: Bechler River

Colonnade Falls ht. upper 35 feet (11 m), ht. lower 67 feet (20 m) is a set of two waterfalls on the Bechler River in Yellowstone National Park. Colonnade Falls is accessible via the Bechler River Trail. The falls were named in 1885 by members of the Arnold Hague Geological Survey probably because the falls resemble a row of columns at regular intervals.

== See also ==
- List of waterfalls
- Waterfalls in Yellowstone National Park
