= Kepler Cascades =

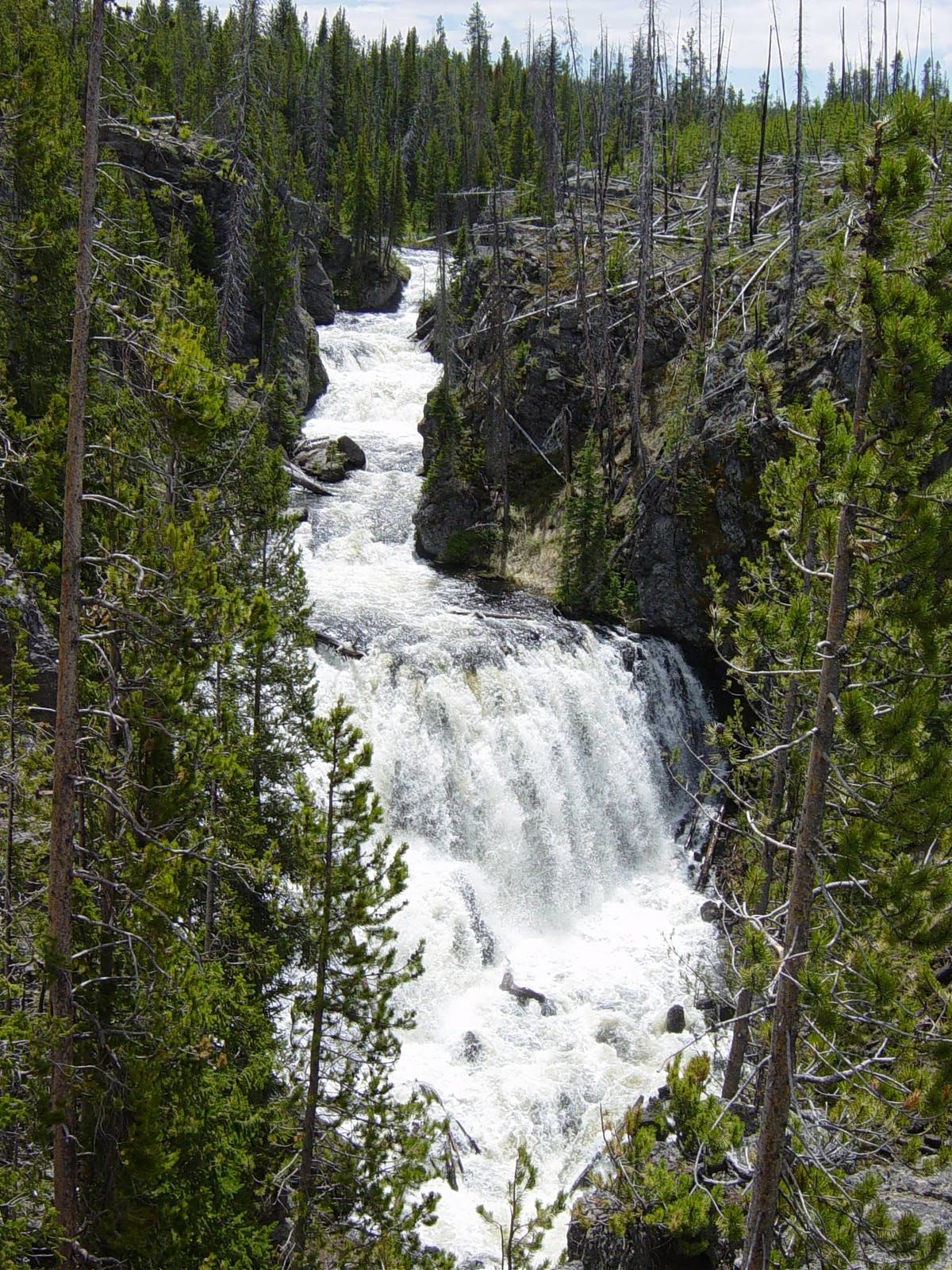
- Kepler Cascades
- Interactive map of Kepler Cascades
- Location: Yellowstone National Park, WY, US
- Coordinates: 44.44573°N 110.80698°W
- Type: Cascade
- Total height: 50 feet (15 m)
- Number of drops: Multiple
- Watercourse: Firehole River

Kepler Cascades is a waterfall on the Firehole River in southwestern Yellowstone National Park in the United States. The cascades are located approximately 2.5 miles south of Old Faithful. The cascades drop approximately 150 feet over multiple drops. The longest drop is 50 feet. The cascades are located very near to and visible from the Old Faithful to West Thumb road.

== History ==
The Kepler Cascades were described by the Washburn-Langford-Doane Expedition in 1870 but not named until 1881. In his 1871 report to the Secretary of War, Gustavus C. Doane, a member of the expedition described Kepler Cascades as:

September 18 [1870]. -- We broke camp at 9 o'clock, traveling along the slopes of the ridges, skirting the ravines through falling timber, and passing in many places over swampy terraces, for a distance of three miles, when we suddenly came upon a mountain torrent, 40 feet wide, and running through a gorge of trachyte lava 200 feet in depth. This was the Firehole River, heading in a lake a few miles to the south. Following down the course of this stream we presently passed two fine roaring cascades, where the water tumbled over rocks to the depth of 20 and 50 feet successively. These pretty little falls, if located on an eastern stream, would be celebrated in history and song; here, amid objects so grand as to strain conception and stagger belief, they were passed without a halt.

The cascades were named by Philetus Norris, park superintendent in 1881 for the 12-year-old son of Wyoming's territorial governor John Wesley Hoyt. Hoyt and his son, Kepler Hoyt, were visiting Yellowstone in 1881 when Norris named the cascades after Kepler.

Images of Kepler Cascades
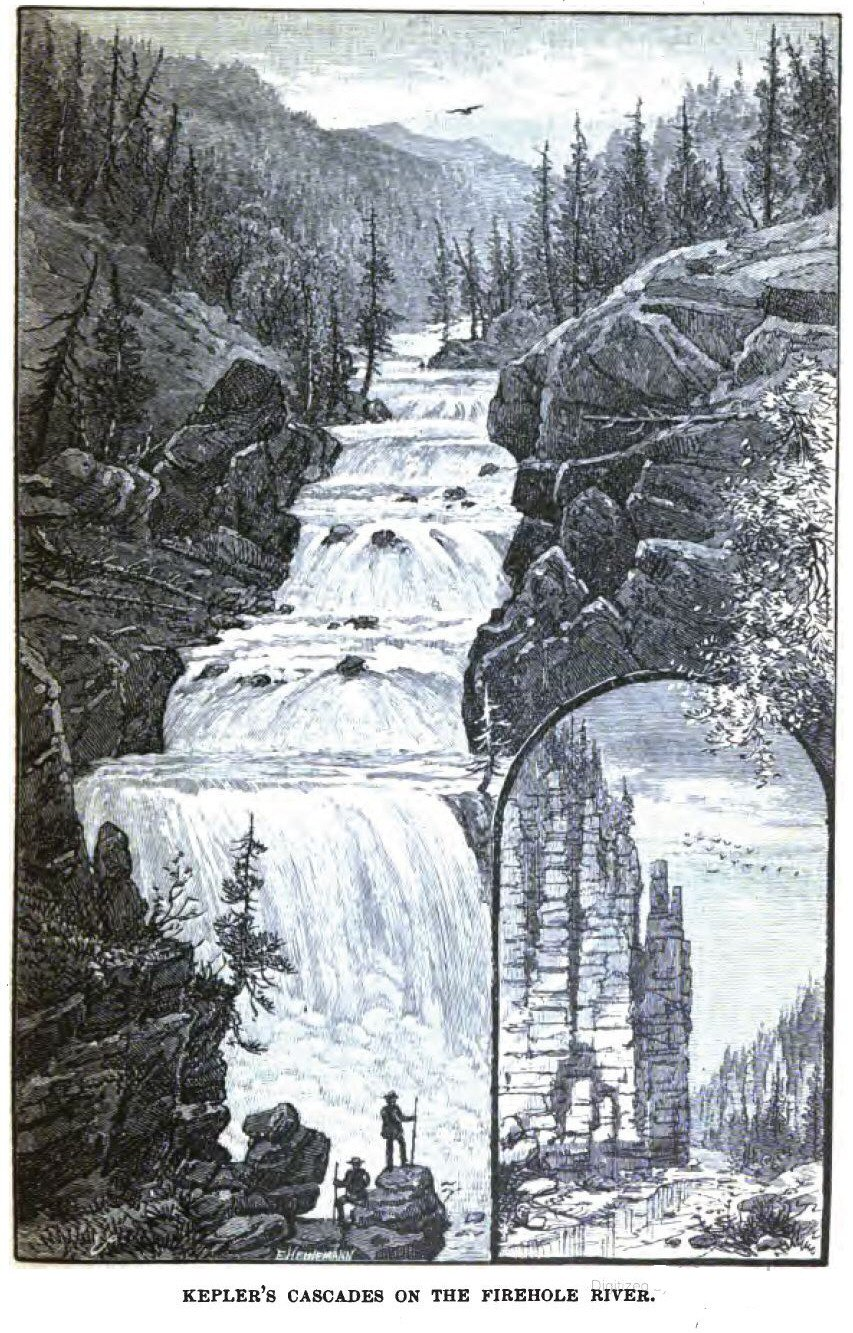
Kepler Cascades, 1883

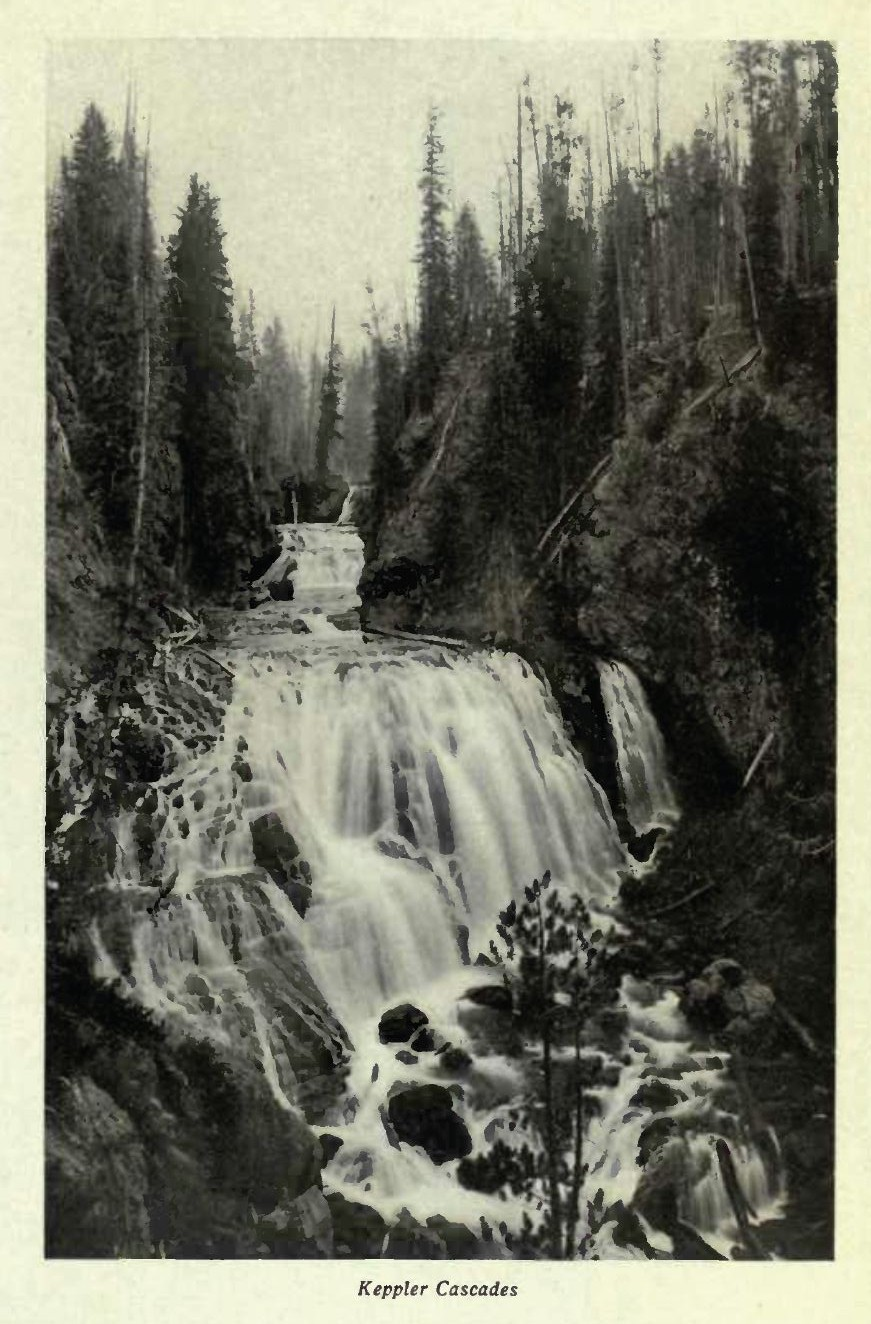
Kepler Cascades, 1901

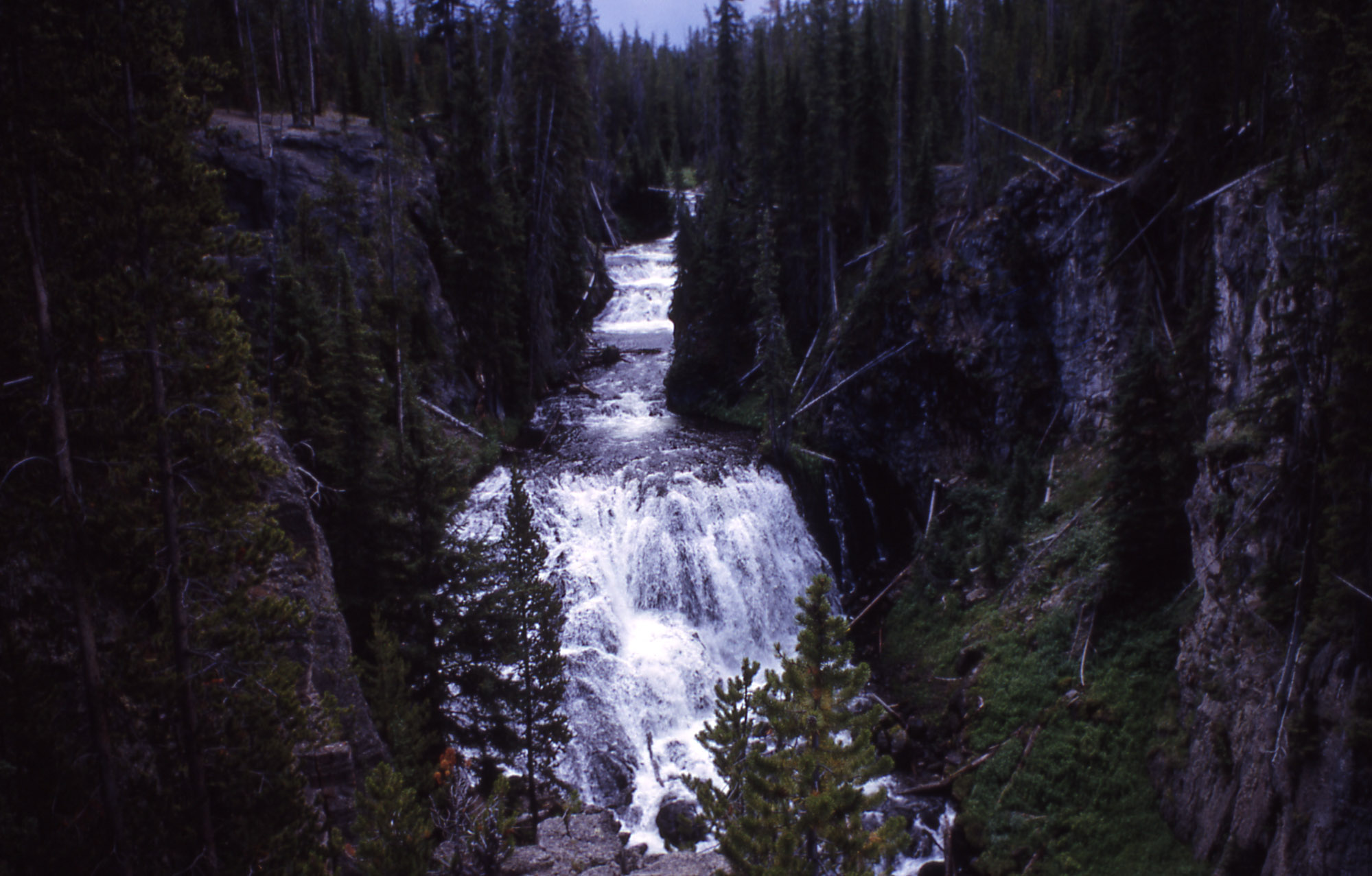
Kepler Cascades, 1962

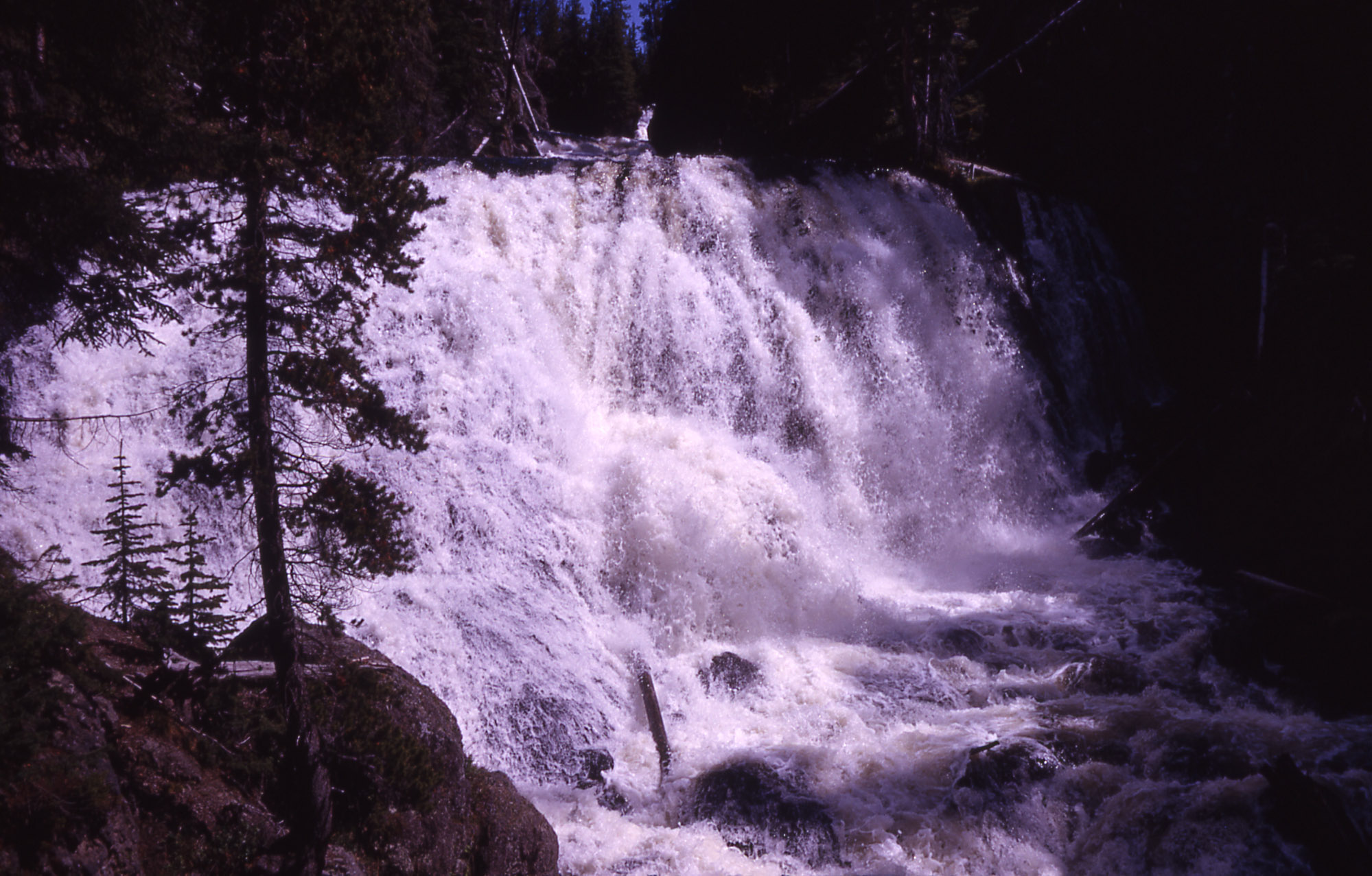
Kepler Cascades, 1963

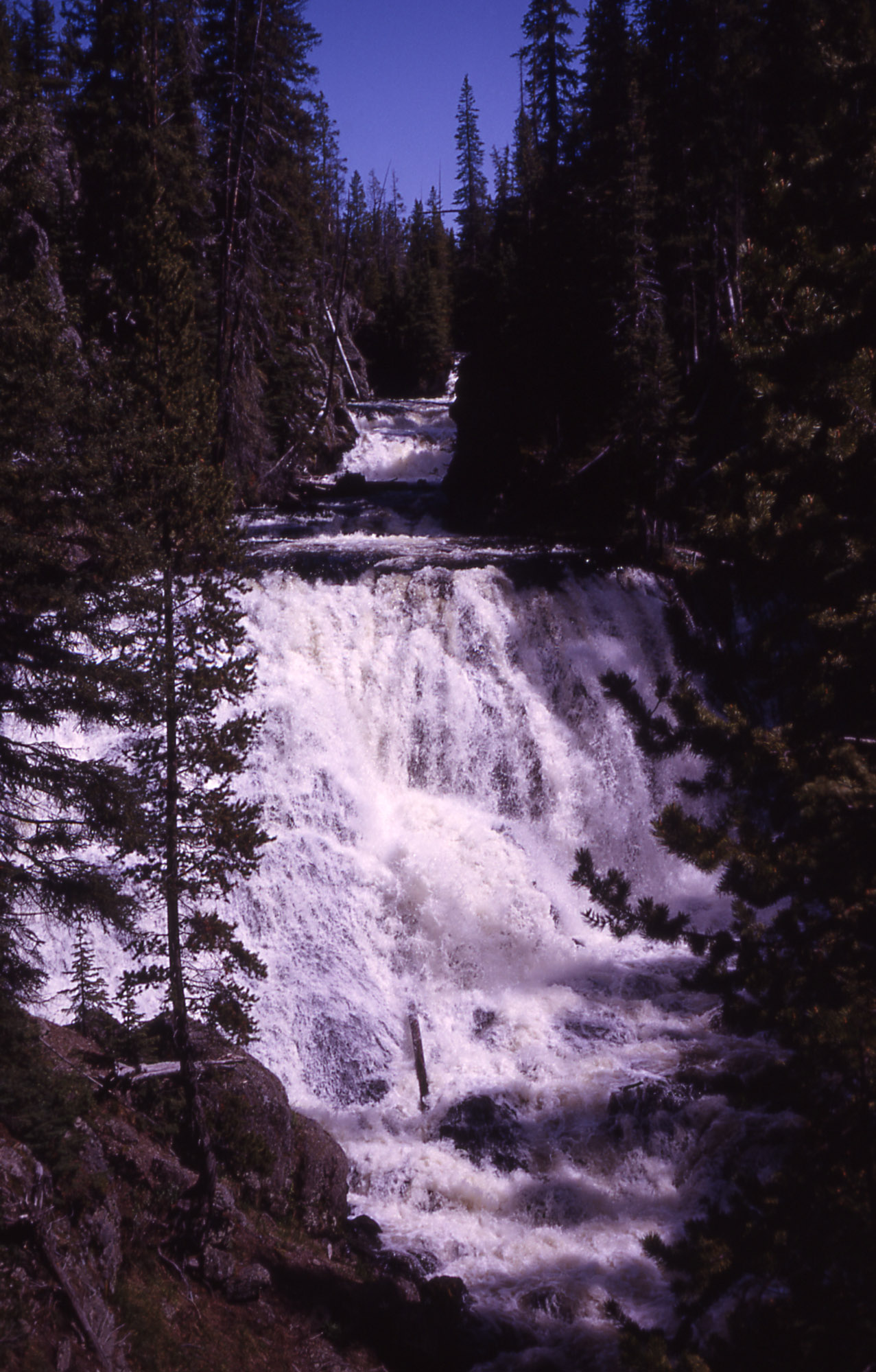
Kepler Cascades, 1963

== See also ==
- List of waterfalls
- Waterfalls in Yellowstone National Park
