= Osprey Falls =

Waterfall in Wyoming, US

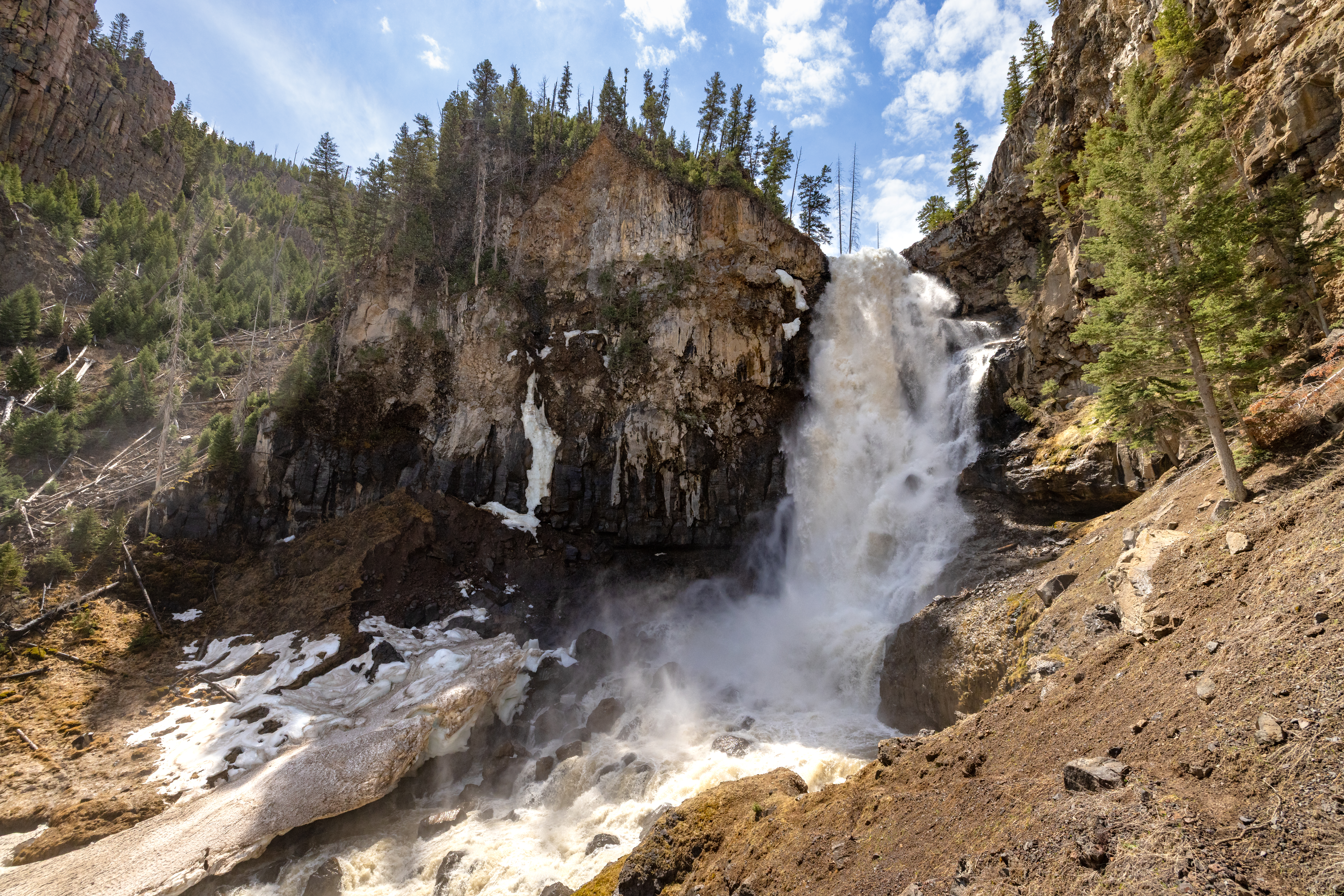
- Osprey Falls in May 2025
- Interactive map of Osprey Falls
- Location: Yellowstone National Park, WY, US
- Coordinates: 44.928333°N 110.681389°W
- Type: Plunge
- Total height: 150 feet (46 m)
- Watercourse: Gardner River

Osprey Falls is a waterfall on the Gardner River in northwestern Yellowstone National Park in the United States. Osprey Falls has a drop of approximately 150 feet (46 m). The falls are located within Sheepeater Canyon and are reachable via the Osprey Falls trail.

== History ==
Members of the Hague Survey named the waterfall in 1885 for the osprey (Pandion haliaetus) that frequents Yellowstone Park.

In 1886, in his Through the Yellowstone Park on Horseback, George Wood Wingate, a former officer in the Union Army, described the falls:

It was a magnificent and most picturesque sight ... The sides [of the canyon] drop from the brink above in almost perpendicular ledges, as steep as the Palisades on the Hudson River and four times their depth. Into this cleft in the rocks, the river plunges in one unbroken fall of over a hundred feet and then continues its fall in a series of cascades to the bottom of the dark chasm. The white fall, the tumbling water, and the dark shadows of the canon, make a striking picture.

— George W. Wingate, 1886.

== See also ==
- List of waterfalls
- Waterfalls in Yellowstone National Park
