= Fall River (Henrys Fork tributary) =

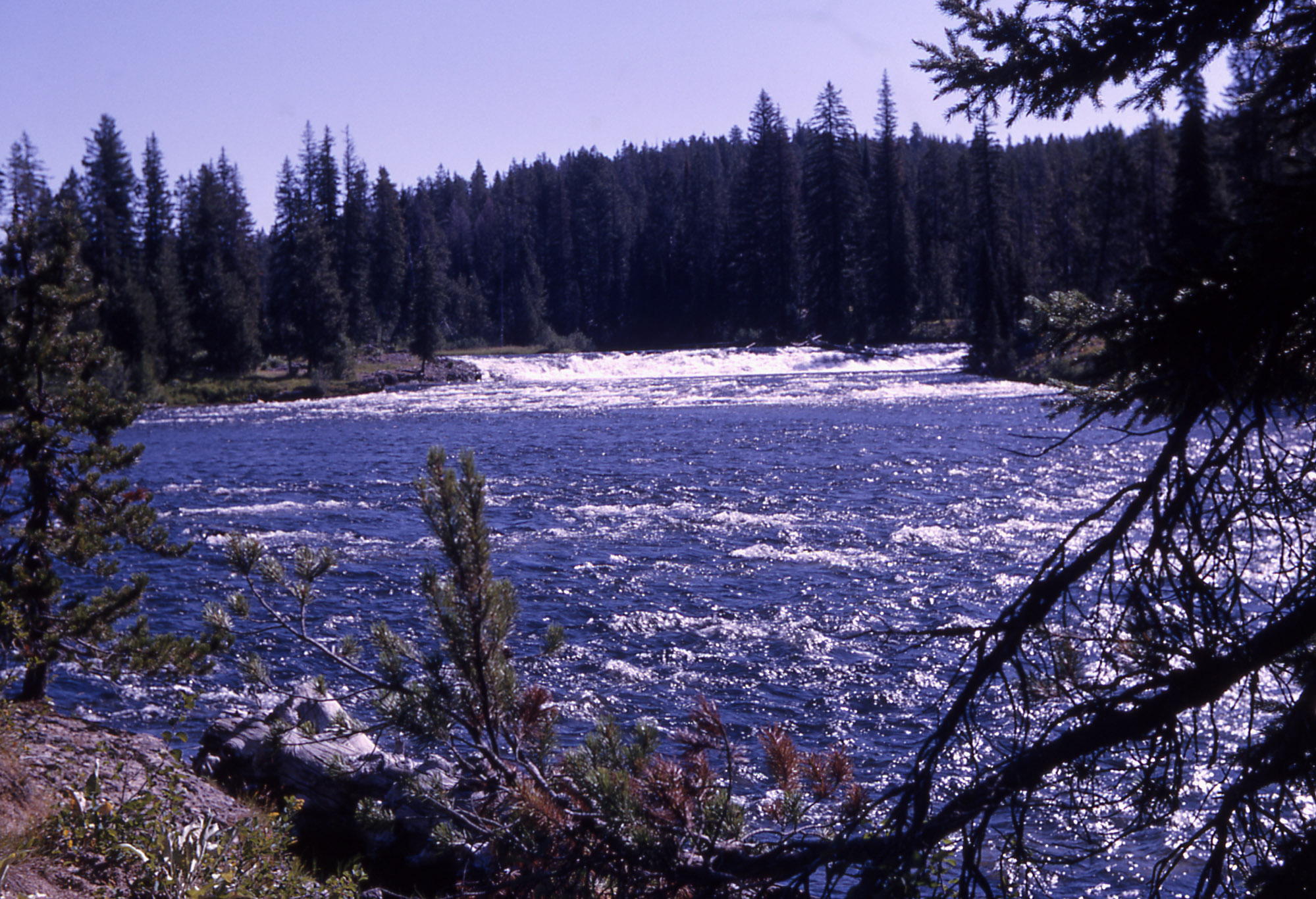
- Fall River, Yellowstone National Park, 1964

- Location of the mouth of the Fall River in Idaho Fall River (Henrys Fork tributary) (the United States)

Location
- Country: United States
- State: Wyoming, Idaho
- Counties: Teton County, Wyoming, Fremont County, Idaho

Physical characteristics
- Source
  - location: southwest of Lewis Lake, Teton County, Wyoming
  - coordinates: 44°14′51″N 110°45′43″W
  - elevation: 8,872 ft (2,704 m)
- Mouth: Henrys Fork
  - location: northeast of St. Anthony, Fremont County, Idaho
  - coordinates: 44°01′07″N 111°34′52″W
  - elevation: 5,046 ft (1,538 m)
- Length: 64 mi (103 km)

Fall River rises on the Madison and Pitchstone Plateaus in the southwest corner of Yellowstone National Park, Wyoming and flows approximately 64 miles (103 km) to its confluence with the Henrys Fork of the Snake River near Ashton, Idaho. Historically, the river was referred to as the Middle Fork of the Snake River or as Fall River or the Falls River by trappers and prospectors as early as the 1830s. It was officially named the Falls River by the 1872 Hayden Geological Survey, but was always called Fall River by the locals and so the U.S. Board on Geographic Names changed the official name to Fall River in 1997 at the request of Idaho authorities. The river is home to numerous waterfalls and cascades in its upper reaches.

== Waterfalls ==
The Fall River is located in the remote Cascade Corner of the park, a name given to the southwest section of the park by then-superintendent Horace Albright in 1921 for the proliferation of waterfalls and cascades in the Fall and Bechler River drainages. Several major Yellowstone waterfalls exist in the Fall River watershed:

- Cave Falls, 20 feet (6.1 m),44°08′41″N 110°59′50″W
- Terraced Falls, 130 feet (40 m), 44°08′50″N 110°51′51″W

== Angling ==
Although the Fall River is in the remote Cascade Corner of the park, it is popular with local anglers. It holds mostly cutthroat trout and a few rainbow trout and brook trout. Because of spring runoff, the river is generally not fishable until mid-July, and access is difficult. Within the park, the upper section of the river is accessible via the Grassy Lake Road, which starts near the south entrance to the park, while the lower sections are accessible via the Cave Falls Road in Idaho. Once the Fall River leaves the park, it is accessible in various locations via Idaho county roads.

== See also ==
- List of rivers of Idaho
- List of longest streams of Idaho
- List of rivers of Wyoming
