= Firehole River =

River in Wyoming, United States

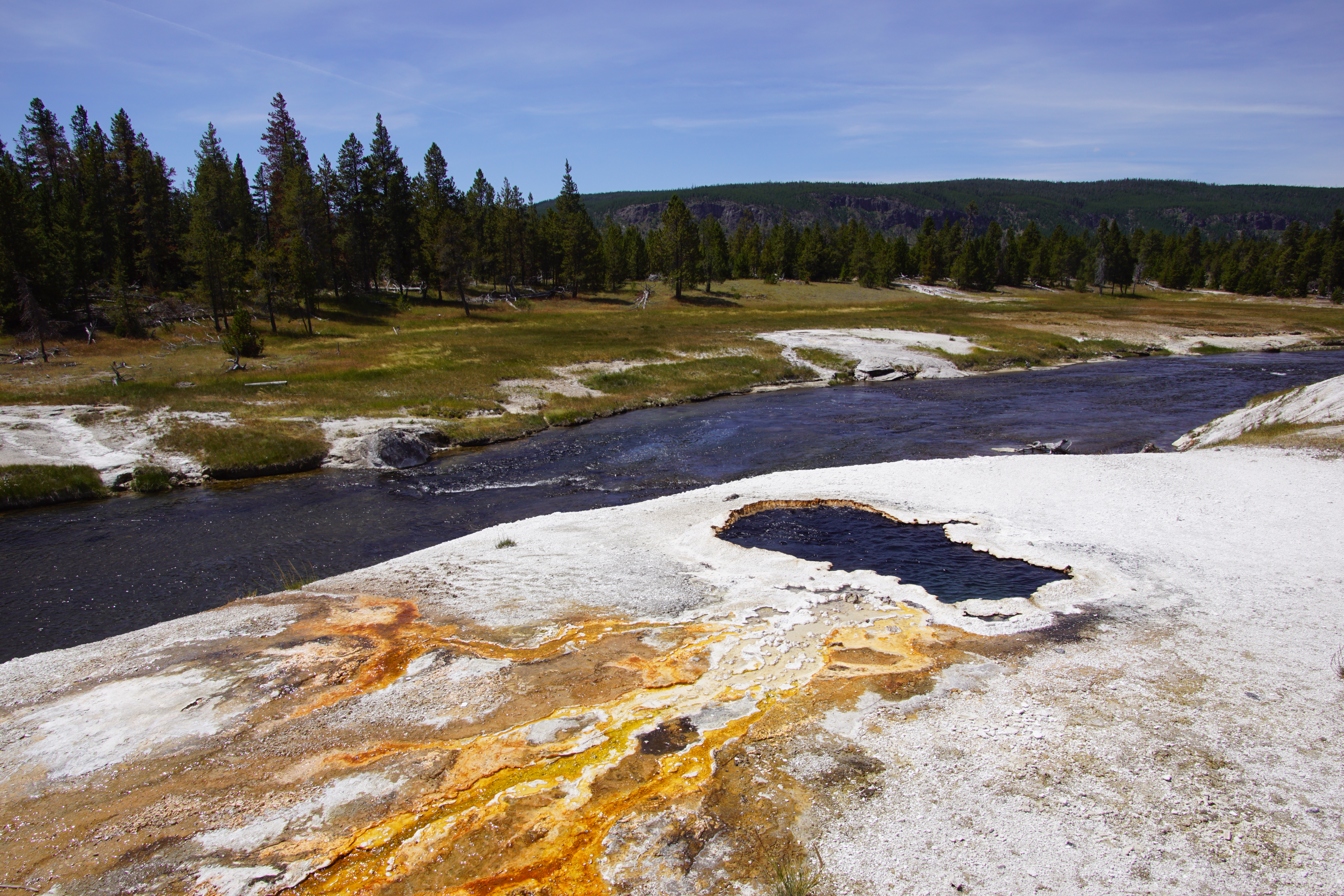
- Firehole River

- Firehole River near South Scalloped Spring Firehole River (the United States)

Location
- Country: United States
- State: Wyoming

Physical characteristics
- Source: Madison Lake
  - location: Yellowstone National Park, Wyoming
  - coordinates: 44°20′37″N 110°52′43″W
- Mouth: Madison River
  - location: Madison Junction, Wyoming
  - coordinates: 44°38′32″N 110°51′56″W
- Length: 21 mi (34 km)
- Discharge
  - location: West Yellowstone
  - average: 307 cu ft/s (8.7 m^{3}/s)

Basin features
- Tributaries
  - left: Sentinel Creek, Fairy Creek, Little Firehole River, Iron Spring Creek
  - right: Nez Perce Creek

The Firehole River is located in northwestern Wyoming, and is one of the two major tributaries of the Madison River. It flows north approximately 21 miles (34 km) from its source in Madison Lake on the Continental Divide to join the Gibbon River at Madison Junction in Yellowstone National Park. It is part of the Missouri River system.

== Description ==
The Firehole River flows through several significant geyser basins in Yellowstone National Park to include the Upper Geyser Basin, which contains the world-famous geyser Old Faithful. The river was named by early trappers for the steam that makes it appear to be smoking as if on fire.

The Firehole flows over three of Yellowstone's major waterfalls: Kepler Cascades south of Old Faithful, Firehole Falls and the Cascades of the Firehole in Firehole Canyon.

The river is surrounded by geothermal features which empty water into it. One effect of the input of this water is to increase the temperature of the water. Temperatures in the river have been measured as high as 30 °C (86 °F) and average 5 to 10 °C (9.0 to 18.0 °F) higher than areas upstream of geothermal influence.

Water entering the river from geothermal features contains dissolved chemicals and minerals. Levels of boron and arsenic have been found to be above the standard limits for protection of aquatic organisms. Despite these levels, brown and rainbow trout live and spawn in the river.

The river contains an invasive species, the New Zealand mud snail (Potamopyrgus antipodarum).

=== Tributaries ===
Significant tributaries of the Firehole are the Little Firehole River, Fairy Creek, Iron Spring Creek, Sentinel Creek and Nez Perce Creek. All these tributaries bring cool waters to the Firehole and provide refuge for trout in the mainstem during mid-summer high temperatures caused by geothermal activity.

== Angling ==
The Firehole River is a famous and storied destination for serious fly fishermen. When it was discovered in the 1830s by American explorers, the Firehole was barren of trout above what is now called Firehole Falls. Brook trout were first introduced to the upper Firehole in 1889, while brown trout, the river's most plentiful trout today, was first stocked in 1890. Rainbow trout were not introduced until 1923. Mountain whitefish are native to the Firehole below Firehole Falls. By the late 19th century, the Firehole and Yellowstone National Park in general was a popular destination for fishermen. In 1955 all stocking programs in the park were discontinued and today's Firehole trout are completely wild populations. In 1968, based on increasing pressure on the Firehole, the Gibbon and Madison rivers, the National Park Service designated these waters as Fly Fishing Only.

== Gallery ==
Images of the Firehole River
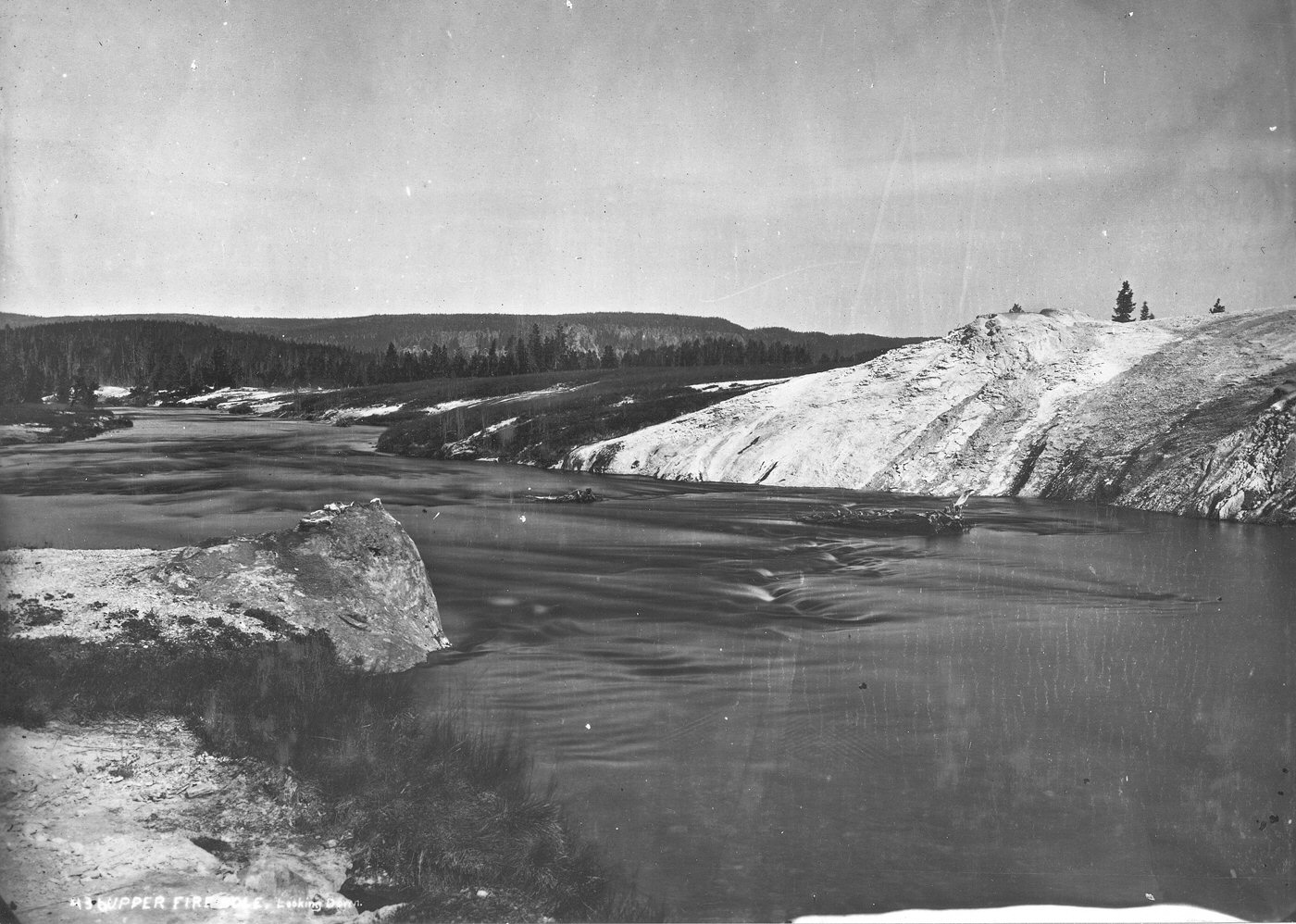
Firehole River upstream from Ojo Caliente bend, 1872

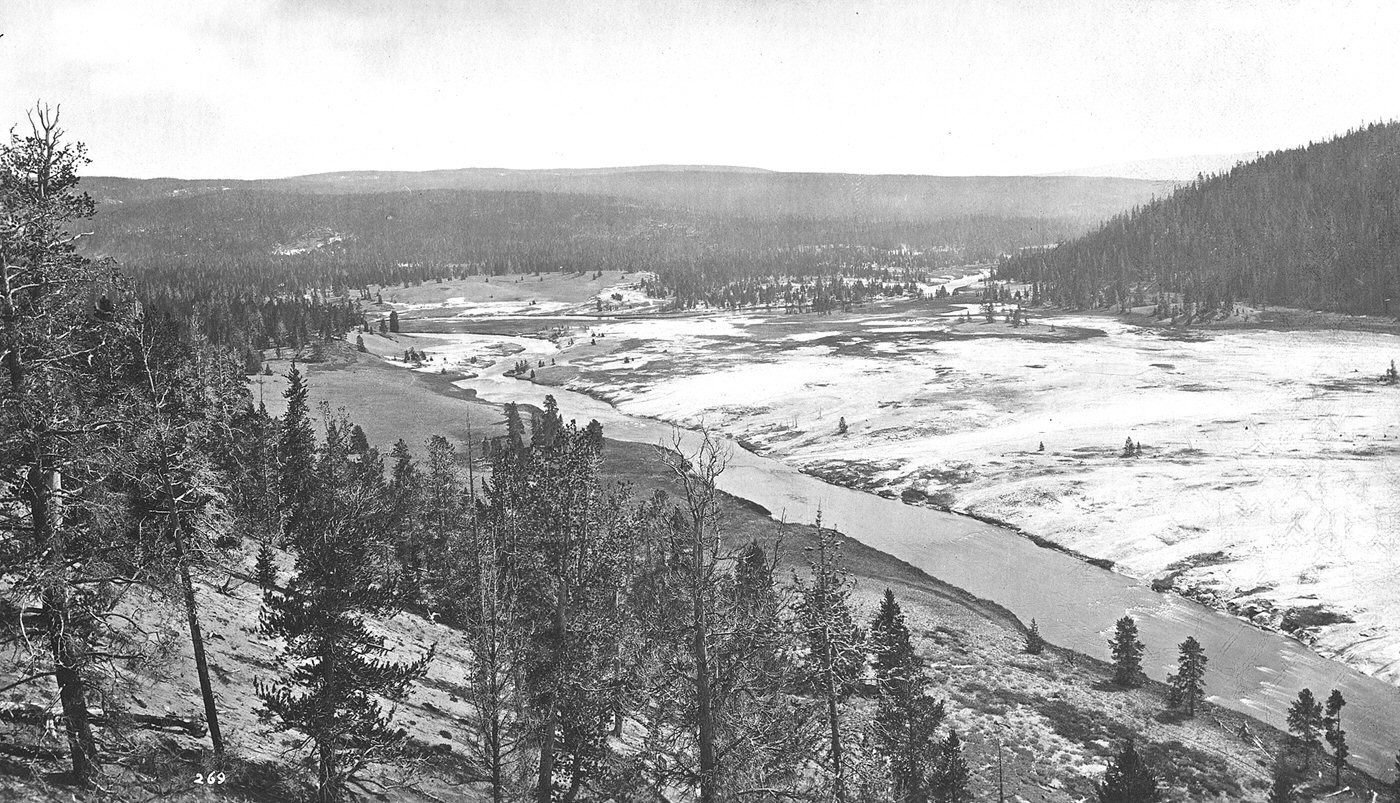
Firehole River at Midway Geyser Basin, 1875

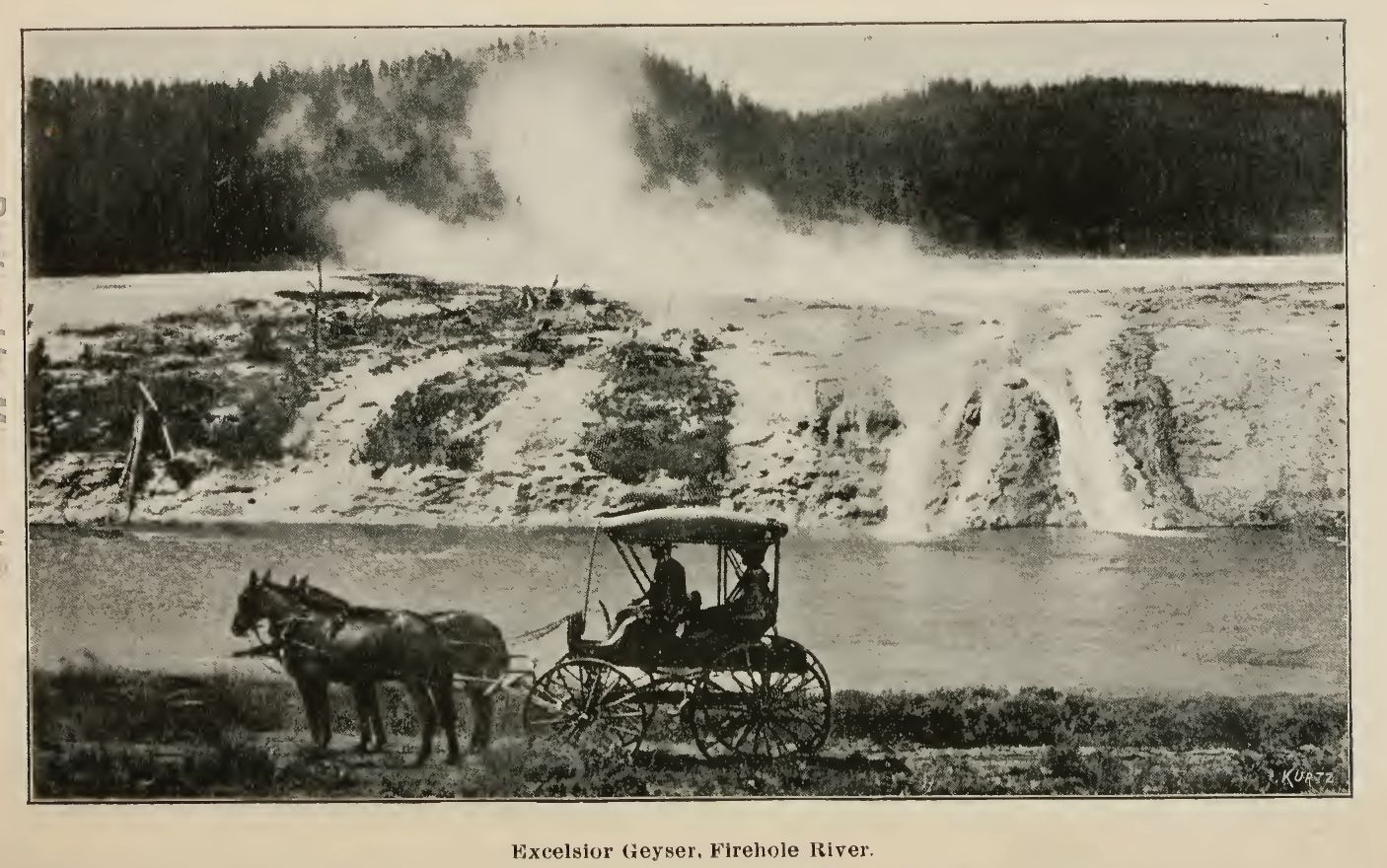
Firehole River, 1894

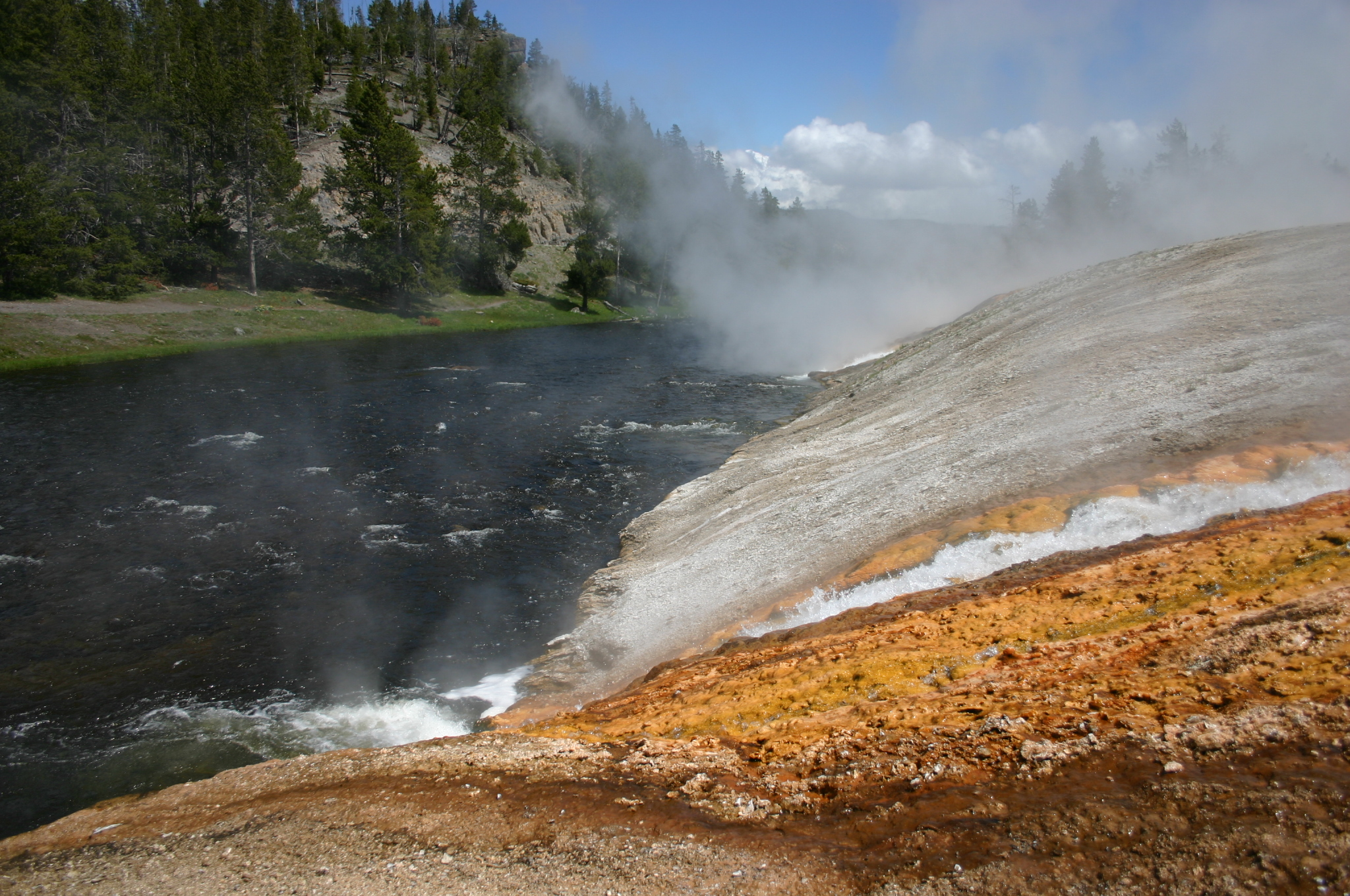
Heavy runoff from Excelsior Geyser to Firehole River

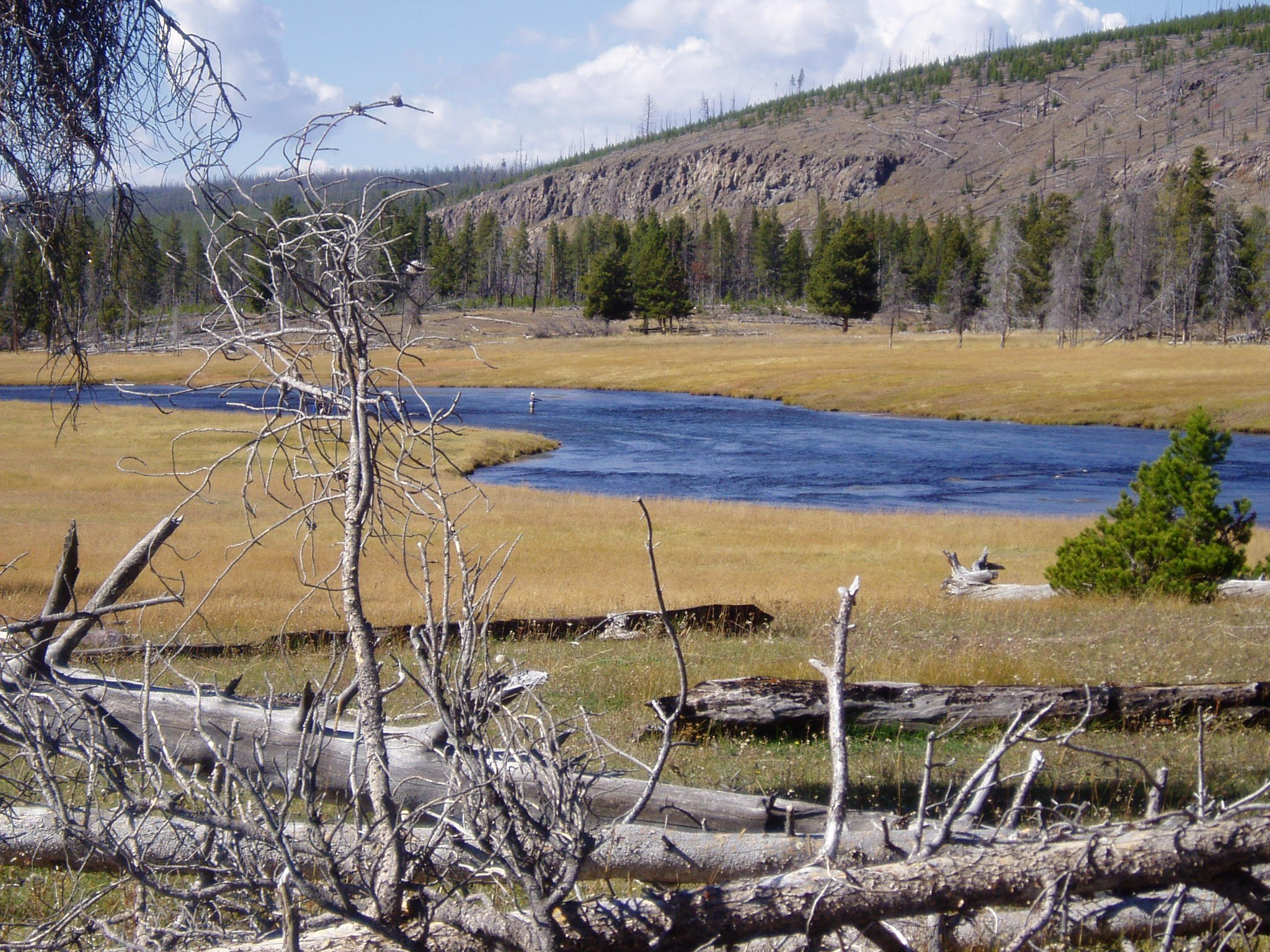
Fountain Flats on The Firehole in September

== See also ==
- Angling in Yellowstone National Park
- Fishes of Yellowstone National Park
- Fly fishing
- Tributaries of the Missouri River
