= Bechler River =

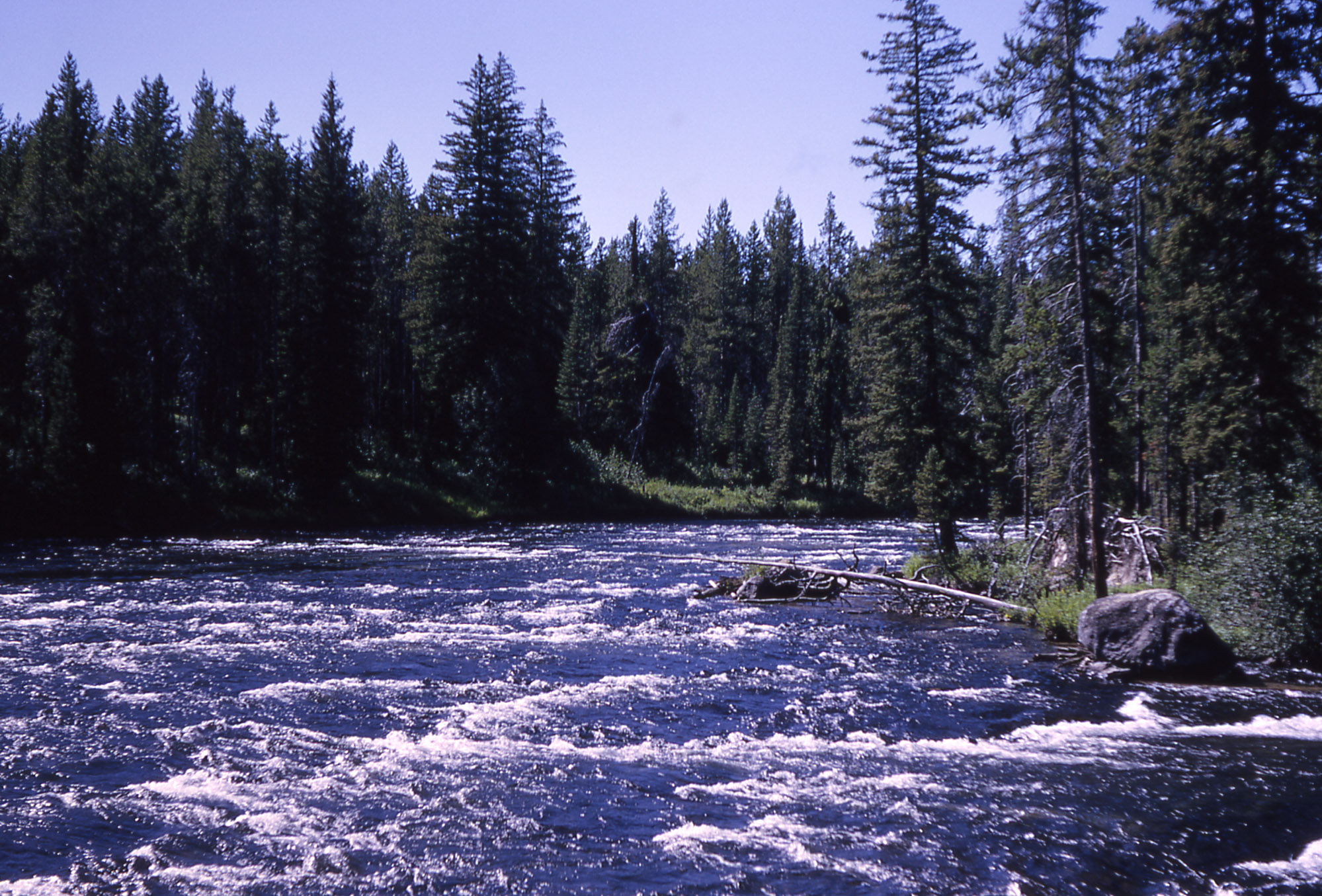
- Bechler River

Physical characteristics
- Source
  - location: Trischman Knob
  - coordinates: 44°17′21″N 110°53′35″W
  - elevation: 6,306 feet (1,922 m)
- Mouth
  - location: Fall River
  - coordinates: 44°08′54″N 110°59′49″W

Basin features
- Tributaries
  - left: Ferris Fork, Littler Fork
  - right: Boundary Creek, Ouzel Creek, Phillips Fork, Gregg Fork

The Bechler River is a remote major river flowing southwest entirely within the confines of Yellowstone National Park to its confluence with the Fall River in the southwest section of the park. The river was named by Frank Bradley, a member of the 1872 Hayden Geological Survey for cartographer and explorer Gustavus R. Bechler, the chief surveyor and mapmaker on the survey. Henry Gannett also a member of the survey claimed that Bechler discovered the river, but trapper Osborne Russell explored the area in 1830.

== Waterfalls ==
The Bechler River is located in the remote southwest part of the park known as Cascade Corner, named by Superintendent Horace Albright in 1921 for the abundance of waterfalls and cascades in the Fall and Bechler River drainages. Several major Yellowstone waterfalls exist in the Bechler River watershed:

- Albright Falls, 260 feet (79 m), 44°16′40″N 110°54′13″W
- Bechler Falls, 15 feet (4.6 m),44°08′57″N 111°00′36″W
- Colonnade Falls, 44°14′19″N 110°56′53″W
  - Upper 35 feet (11 m)
  - Lower 67 feet (20 m)
- Dunanda Falls, 150 feet (46 m), 44°14′52″N 111°01′27″W
- Gwinna Falls, 15 feet (4.6 m), 44°16′55″N 110°52′49″W
- Iris Falls, 45 feet (14 m), 44°14′30″N 110°56′37″W
- Ouzel Falls, 230 feet (70 m), 44°14′06″N 110°58′33″W
- Quiver Cascade, 98 feet (30 m), 44°18′18″N 110°52′53″W
- Ragged Falls, 45 feet (14 m), 44°17′17″N 110°53′24″W
- Tempe Cascade, 30 feet (9.1 m), 44°18′06″N 110°52′14″W
- Twister Falls, 55 feet (17 m),44°17′51″N 110°51′43″W
- Wahhi Falls, 44°16′31″N 110°52′40″W
  - Upper 28 feet (8.5 m)
  - Lower 18 feet (5.5 m)

== Angling ==
Although the Bechler River is in the remote Cascade Corner of the park, it is popular with local anglers. It holds mostly cutthroat trout and a few rainbow trout. Because of spring runoff, the river is generally not fishable until mid-July and access is difficult. The river is paralleled by the Bechler River Trail which starts at Cave Falls on the park's south boundary or spurs off the Shoshone Lake trail.
