= Arnold Hague =

American geologist

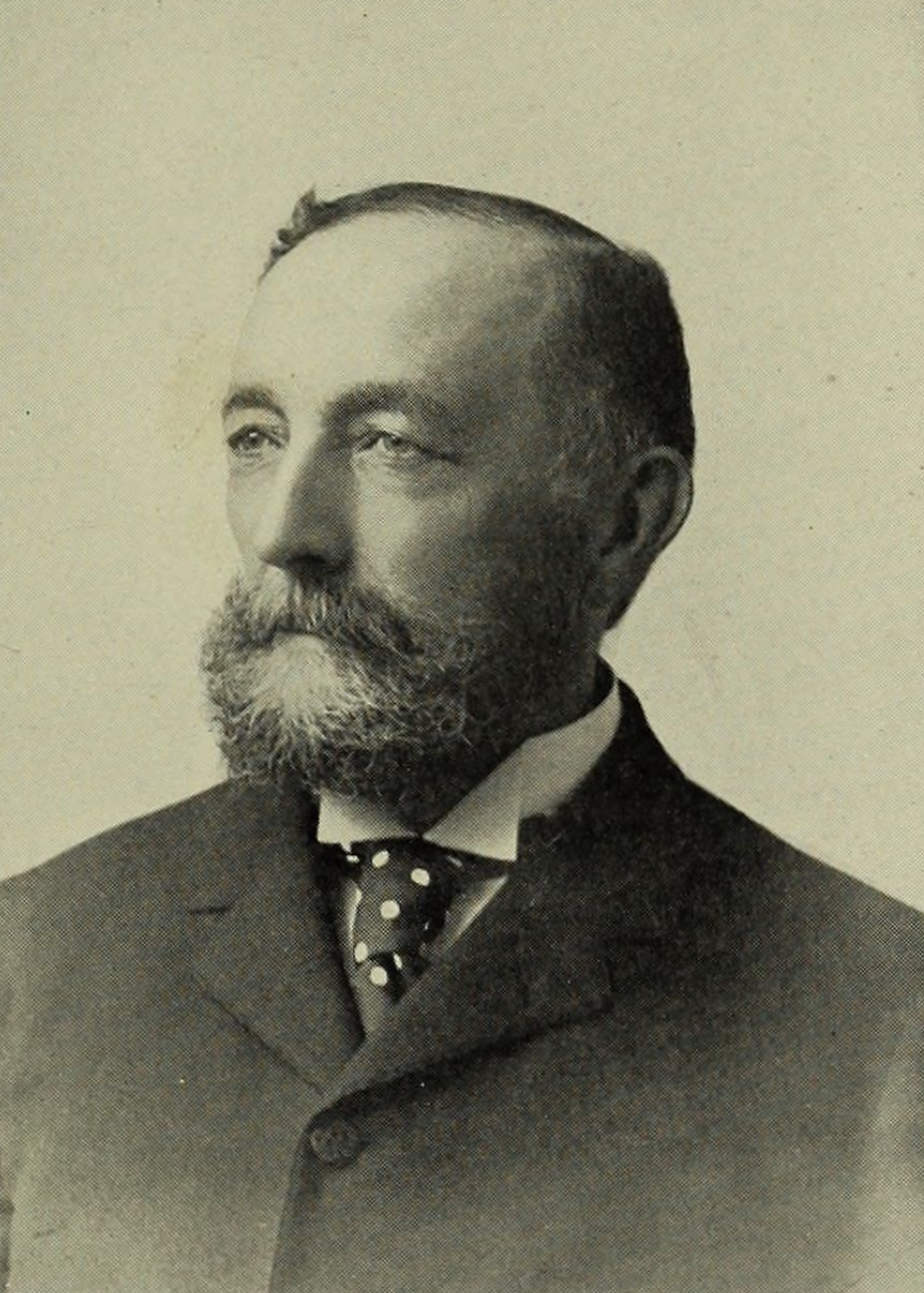
- Born: December 3, 1840; Boston, Massachusetts
- Died: May 14, 1917 (aged 76); Washington, D.C.
- Education: The Albany Academy; Sheffield Scientific School; University of Göttingen; Heidelberg University; Freiberg Mining Academy
- Occupation: Geologist
- Organization: United States Geological Survey

22nd President of the Geological Society of America
- In office 1910
- Preceded by: Grove Karl Gilbert
- Succeeded by: William Morris Davis

Signature
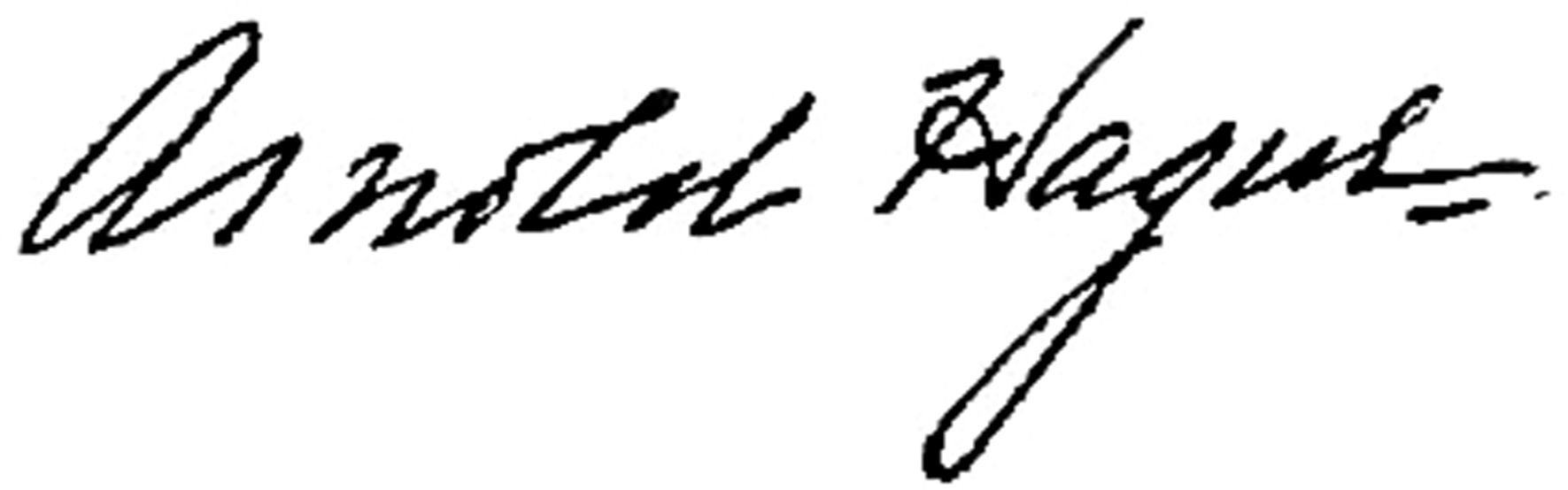

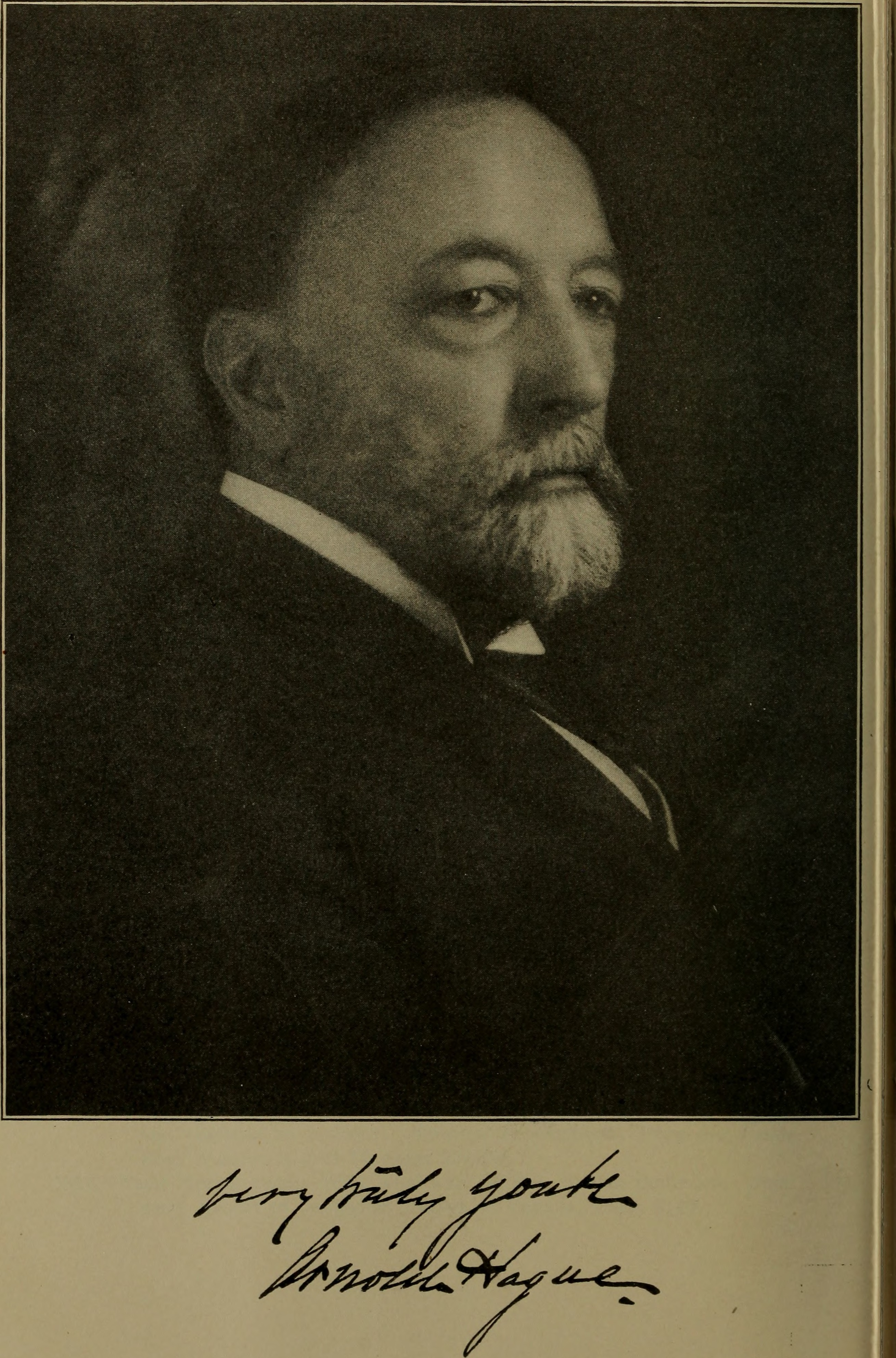
Arnold Hague in 1918

Arnold Hague (December 3, 1840 – May 14, 1917) was an American geologist who did many geological surveys in the U.S., the best known of which was of Yellowstone National Park. He also had assignments in China and Guatemala. He became a member of the United States Geological Survey in 1879 when it was first organized.

== Biography ==
Hague was born December 3, 1840, in Boston, Massachusetts, to William Hague, a clergyman. He graduated from Sheffield Scientific School at Yale University in 1863. He then spent 3 years in Germany, studying at the universities of Göttingen and Heidelberg, and at the Freiberg Mining Academy.

In 1867, he returned to the United States, and was appointed assistant geologist on the U. S. geological exploration of the 40th parallel under Clarence King. He then went to California and spent the winter of 1867–68 in Virginia City, Nevada, studying the surface geology of the Comstock Lode and the chemistry of the amalgamation process as practiced there, and known as the Washoe process. The results of this study were published in Volume III of the report of the exploration, under the title of "Chemistry of the Washoe Process". He also contributed to the same volume a chapter on the geology of the White Pine mining district, which first brought to notice the great development of Devonian rocks in the Great Basin of Utah and Nevada. In Volume II—"Descriptive Geology"—of the report of the exploration, which was the joint work of Hague and Samuel F. Emmons, the results are given of a detailed geological survey across the cordilleras of North America, from the Great Plains to the Sierra Nevada range in California. This work included a geological atlas of maps and sections, which was completed after a great deal of hardship, the map of the Great Basin being accomplished before the completion of either the Union or Central Pacific Railroad.

On the termination of this work in 1877, he received the appointment of government geologist of Guatemala, and traveled extensively over the republic, visiting the principal mining regions and the canters of volcanic activity. In 1878, he was engaged by the Chinese government to examine gold, silver, and lead mines in northern China.

On the organization of the U. S. Geological Survey in 1879, he returned to the United States and became one of its geologists. He was sent to Nevada, and made a report on the "Geology of the Eureka District". In 1883, he was made geologist of the Yellowstone Park division, and he was assigned to the study of the geysers of that district in connection with the extinct volcanic regions of the Rocky Mountains.

He was a member of scientific societies both in the United States and Europe, and in 1885, he was elected to the National Academy of Sciences. He received an Sc.D. degree from Columbia University in 1901, and an LL.D. degree from Aberdeen University. In 1903, he was elected to the American Philosophical Society.

He was a member of the commission appointed by the National Academy of Sciences at the request of the U.S. government in 1896 to prepare plans for the National Forest preserves. He was vice president of the International Congresses of Geologists held in Paris in 1900, in Stockholm in 1910, and in Toronto in 1913. He became president of the Geological Society of America in 1910.

Hague died May 14, 1917, in Washington, DC.

== Works ==
He made numerous contributions to scientific journals, on lithology and geology, and was the principal author of these memoirs:

- The Volcanoes of California, Oregon, and Washington Territory (1883)
- The Volcanic Rocks of the Great Basin (1884)
- On the Development of Crystallization in the Igneous Rocks of Washoe (1885)
- Nevada, with Notes on the Geology of the District (1885)
- The Volcanic Rocks of Salvador (1886)
- Geological History of the Yellowstone National Park (1888)
