= List of fishes of Yellowstone National Park =

Fishes of Yellowstone National Park

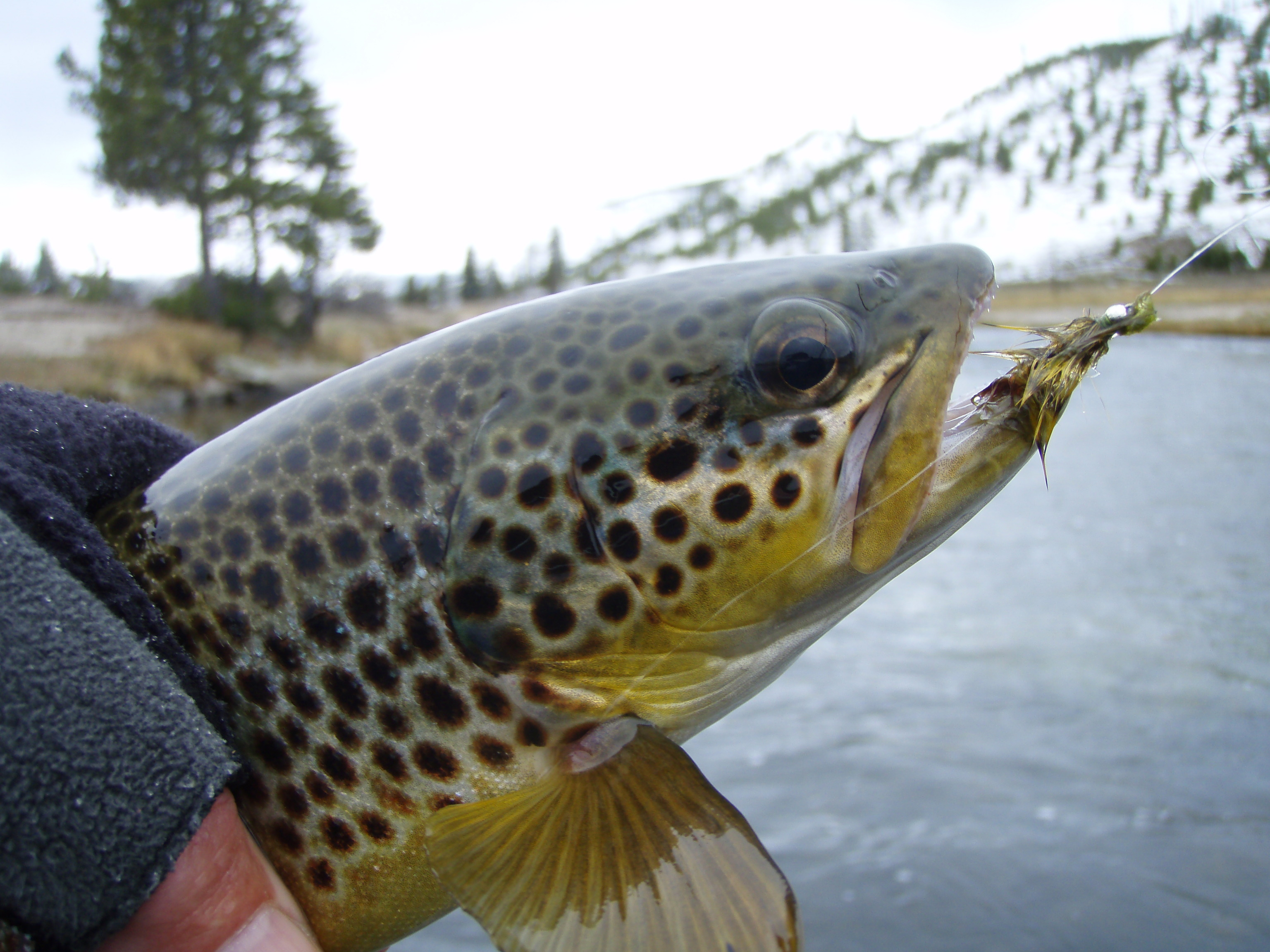
Yellowstone brown trout

The fish of Yellowstone National Park, in the US states of Idaho, Montana and Wyoming, include 13 native fish species and six introduced or non-native species. Angling for trout has been a pastime in the park since its creation and trout species dominate the fish inhabiting the park. When Yellowstone National Park was created in 1872, 40% of the park's waters were barren of fish, including most alpine lakes and rivers above major waterfalls. Only 17 of 150 lakes held fish.

In 1889 the U.S. Bureau of Fisheries began a 60-year program of stocking and hatchery operations that significantly altered the ranges of native and non-native species within the park. By 1955, all stocking and hatchery operations in the park had been stopped. Several introduced species never established viable populations, and at least one introduced species was successfully eradicated from the park.

== Native species ==
The following fish are native to the park, although their original ranges may have been severely reduced since the park's establishment or they may have been introduced into waters outside their original range, especially into alpine lakes. Native species are completely protected in the park and may not be harvested by anglers.

Fish native to Yellowstone
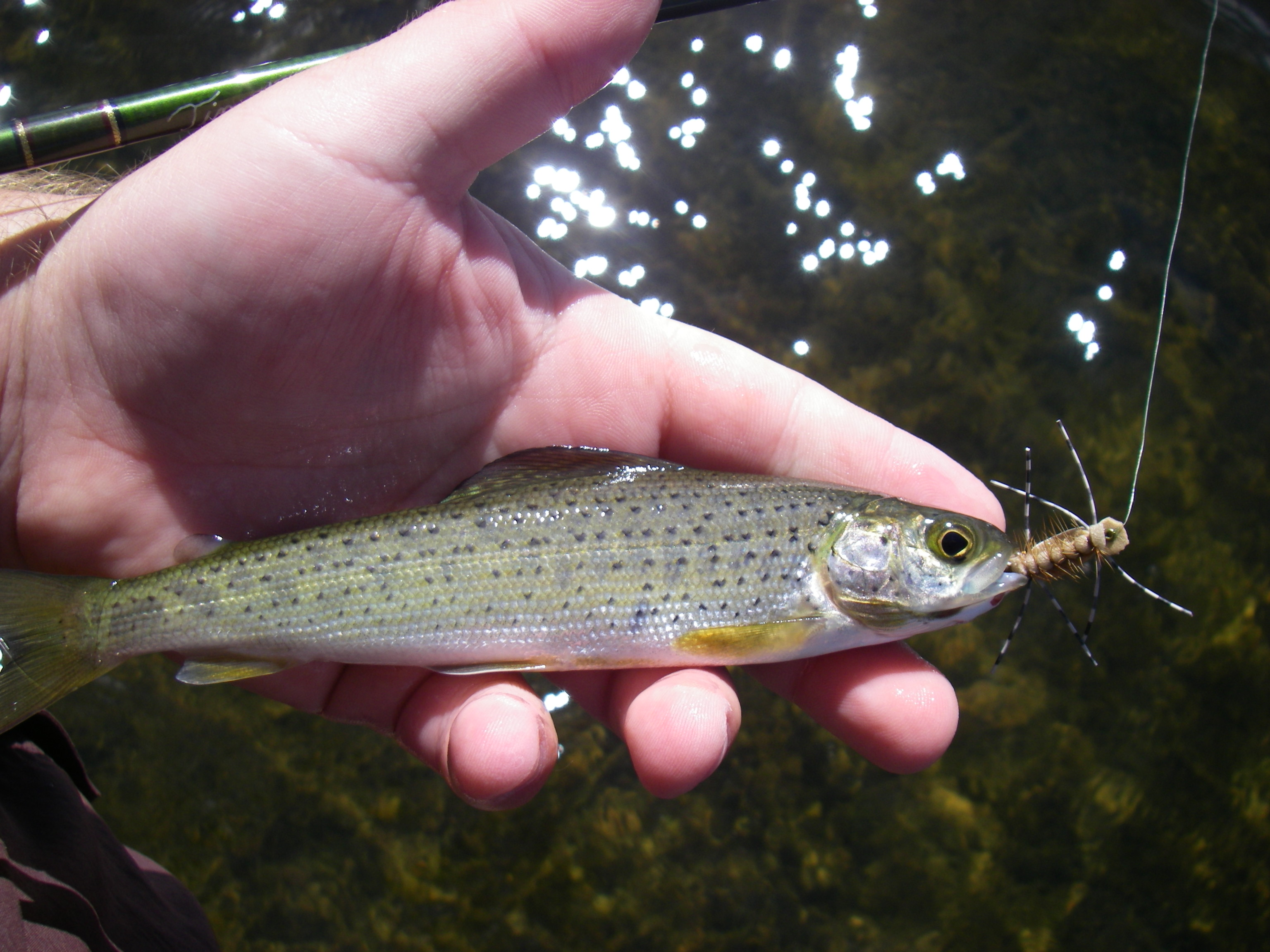
Grebe Lake grayling

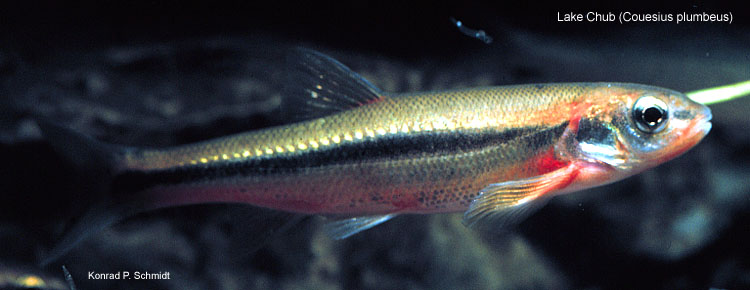
Lake chub

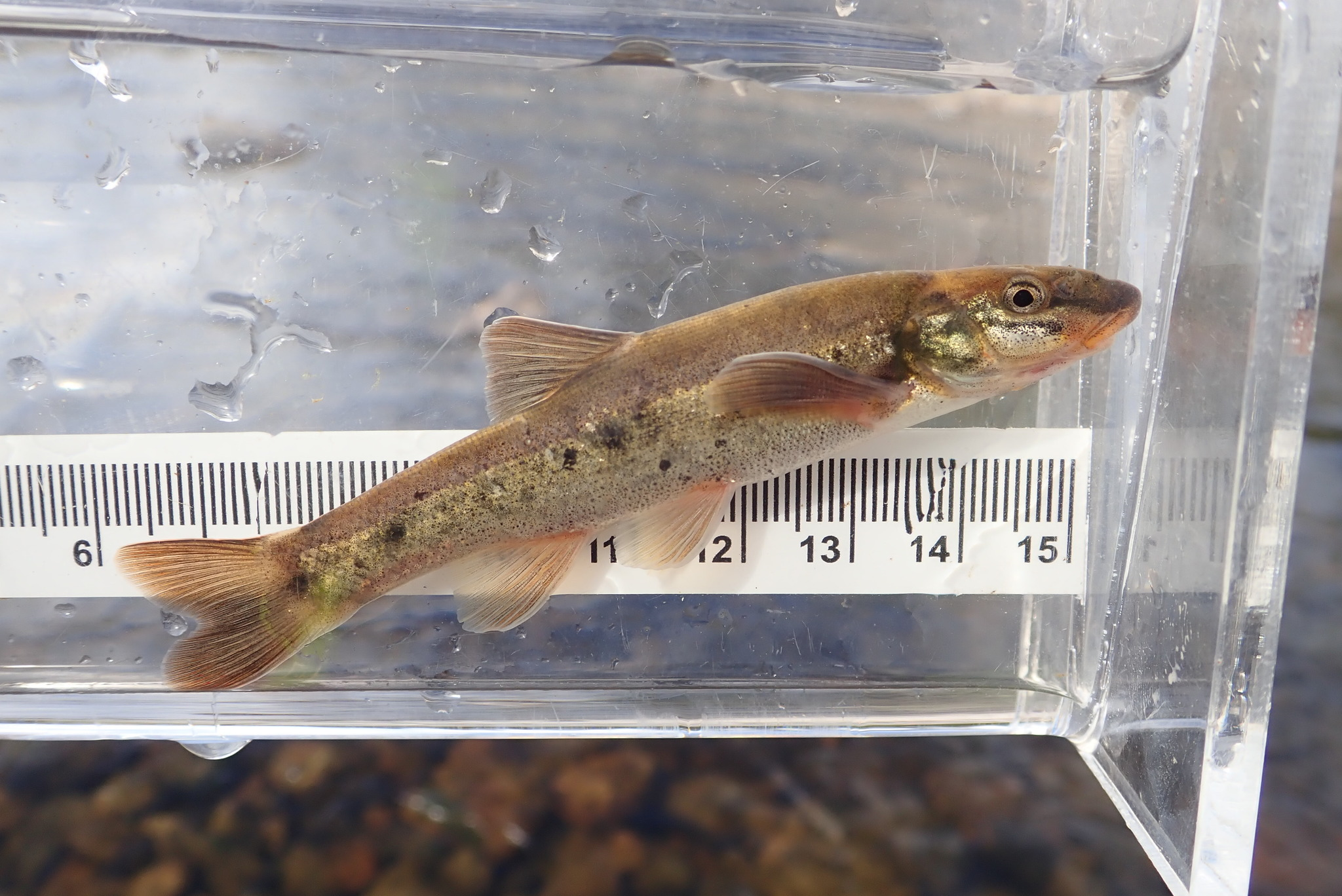
Longnose dace

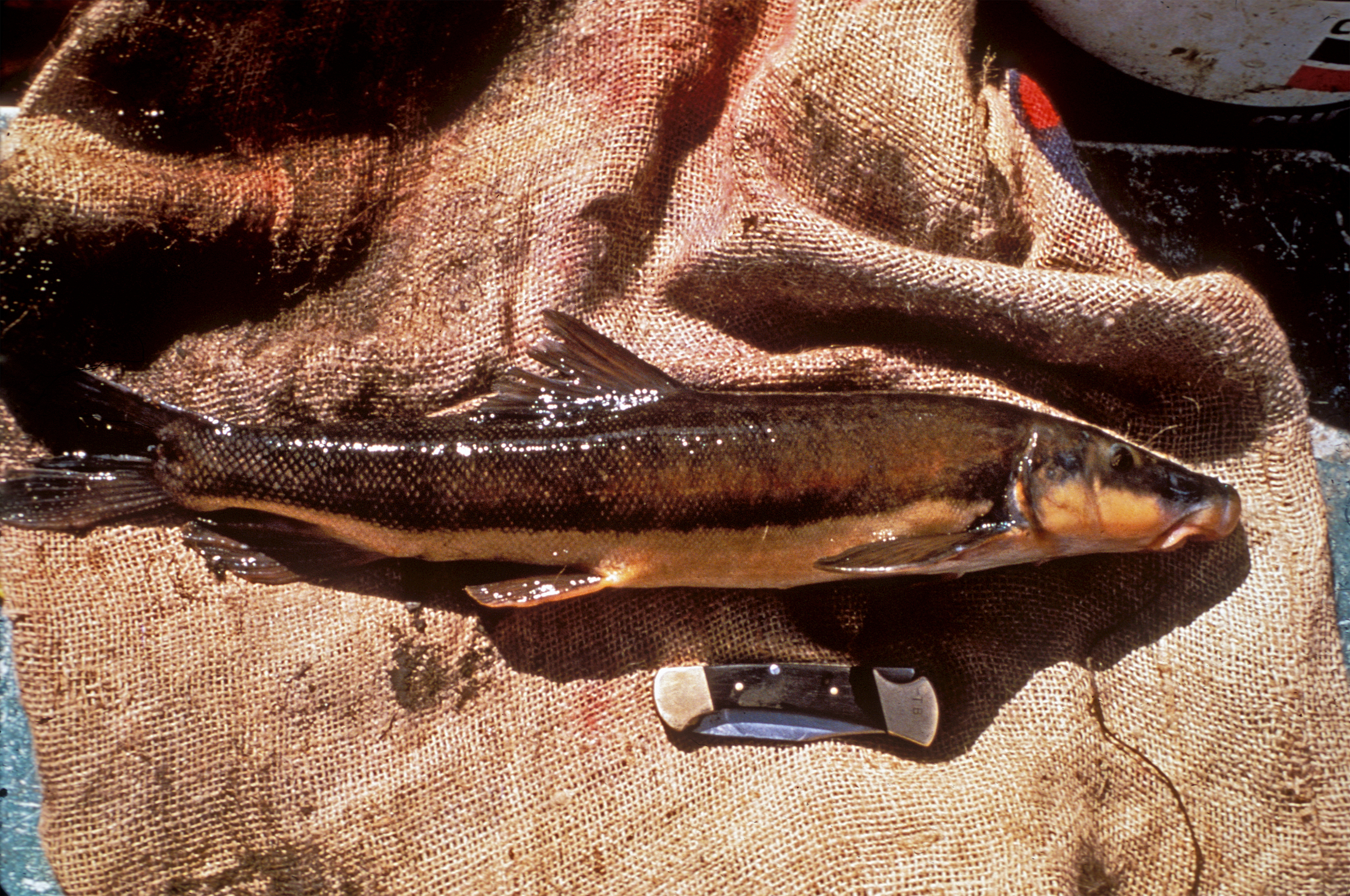
Longnose sucker

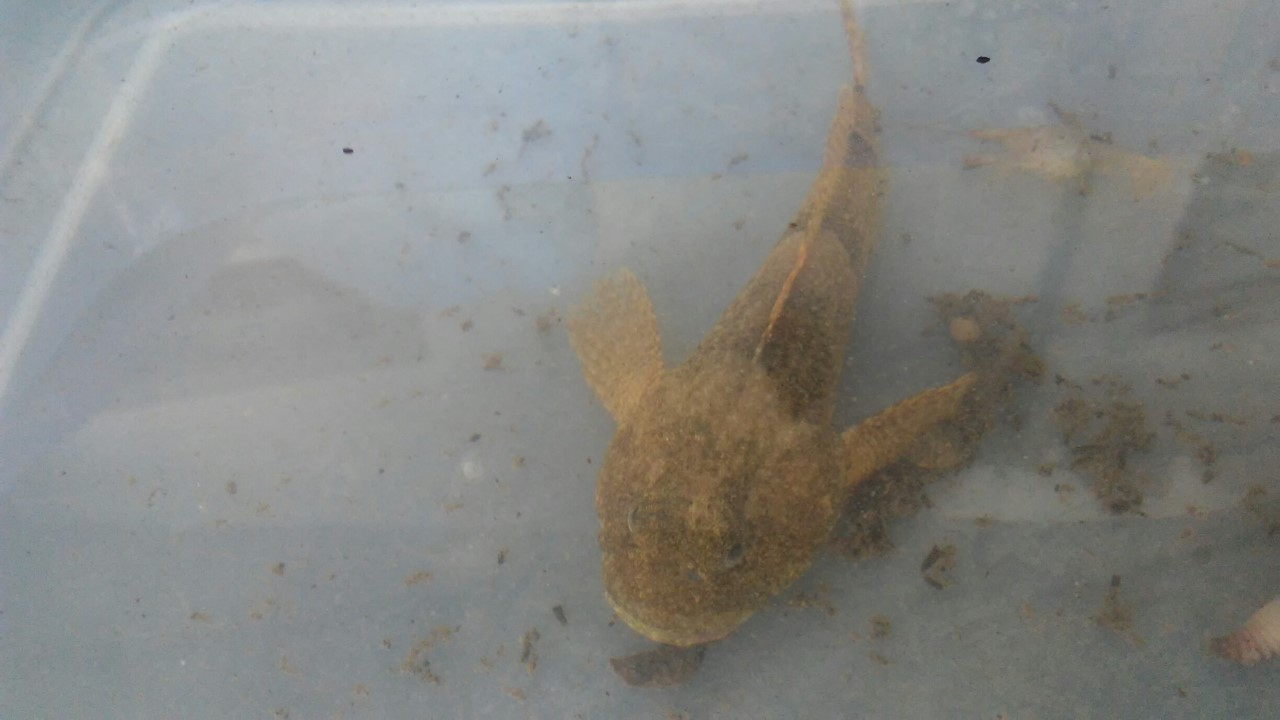
Mottled sculpin

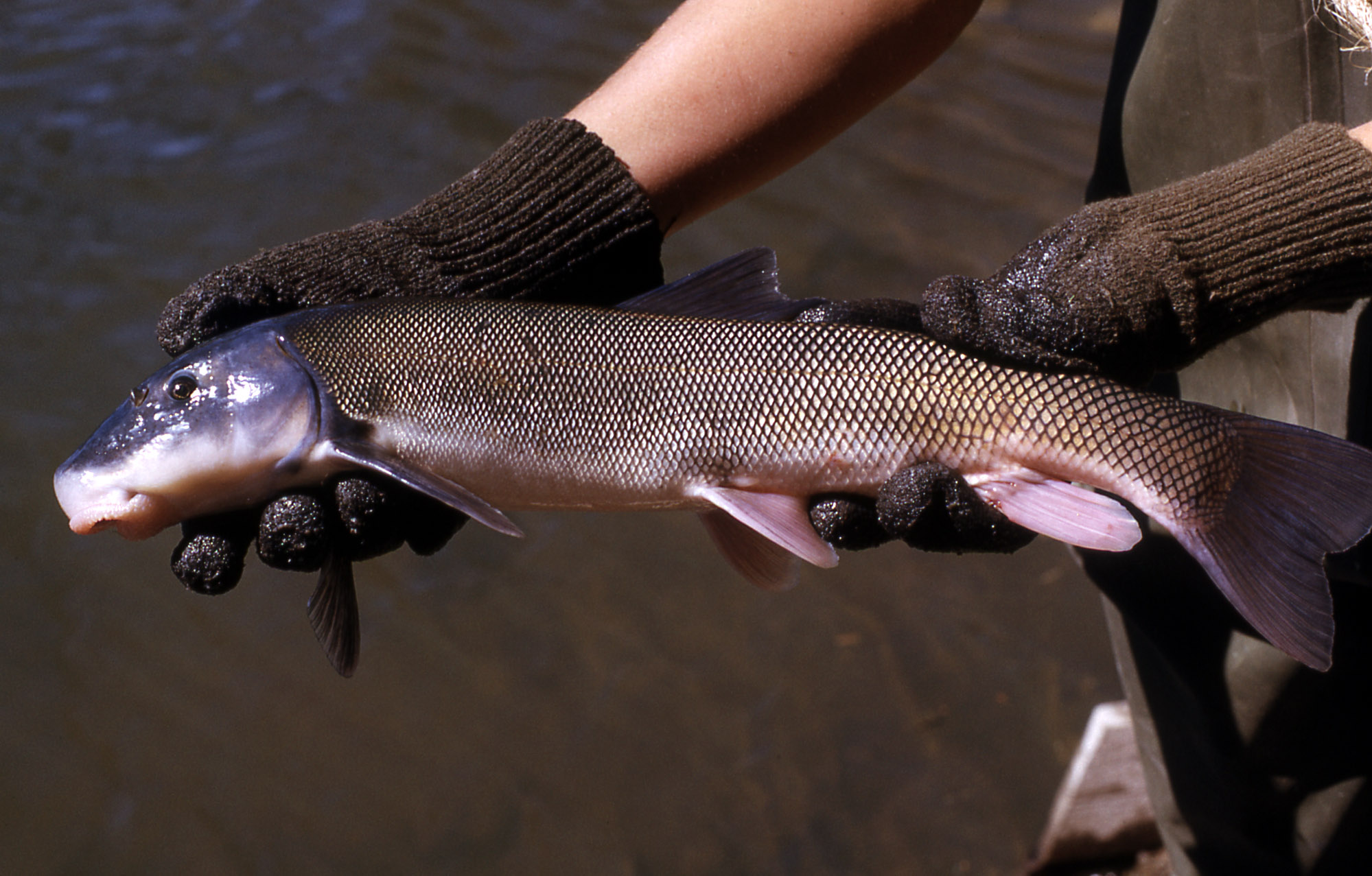
Mountain sucker

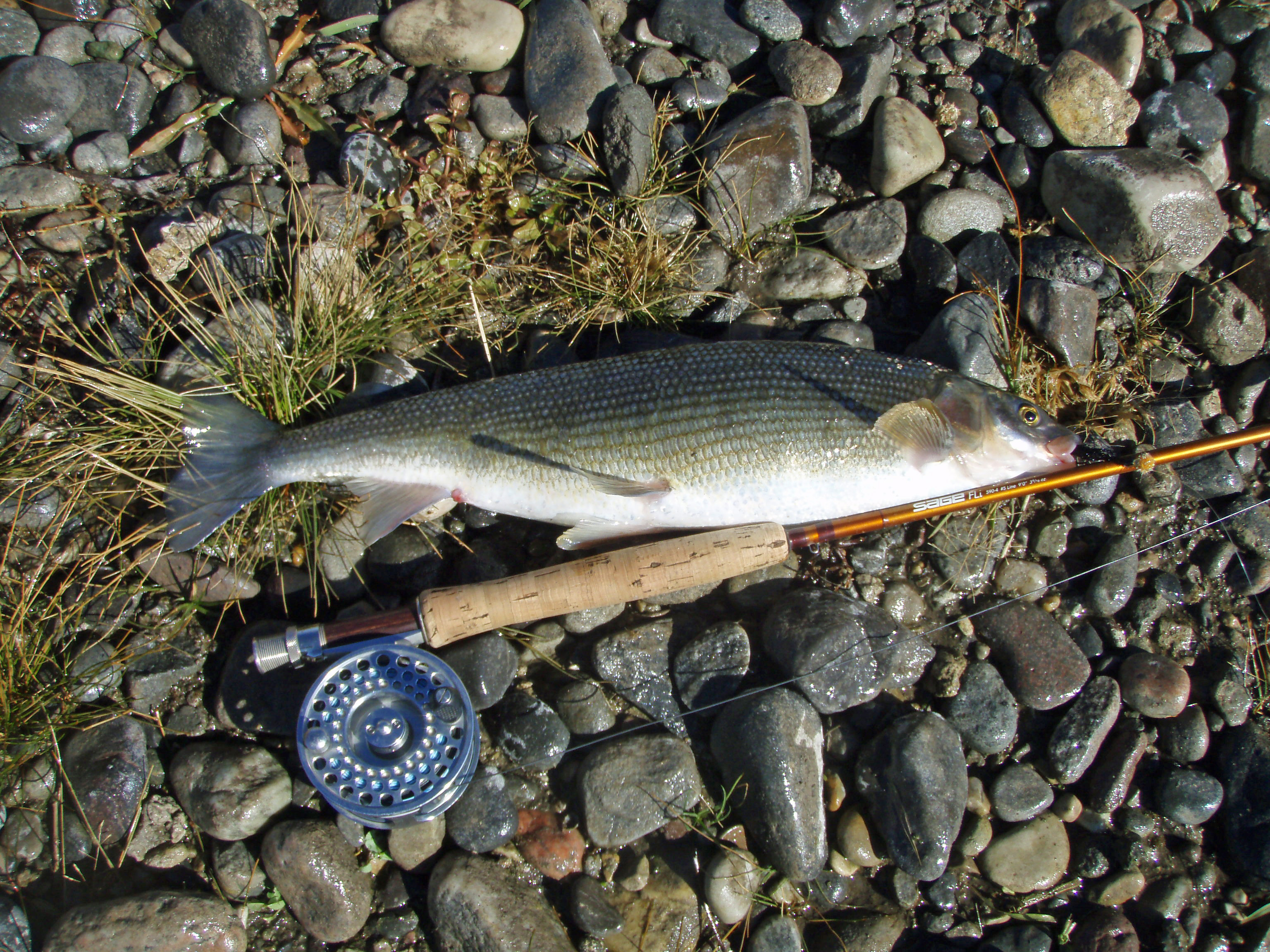
Mountain whitefish

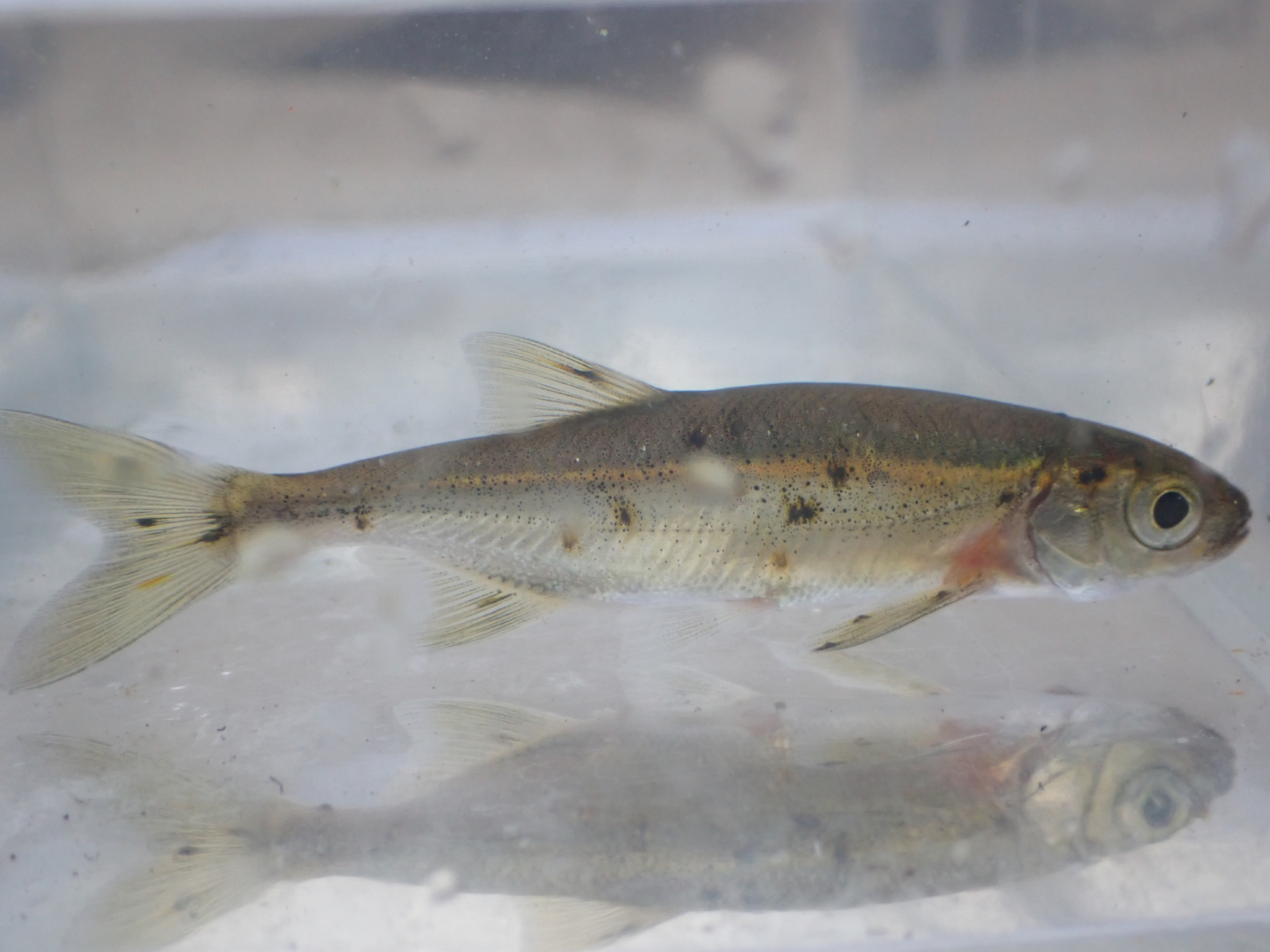
Redside shiner

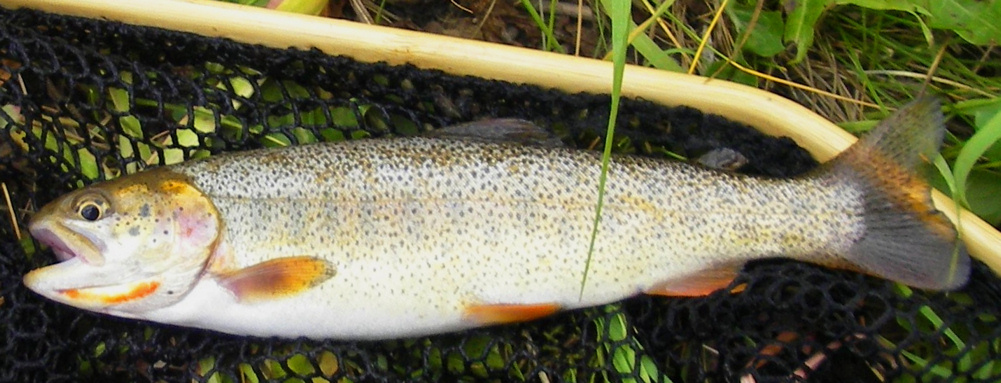
Snake River fine-spotted cutthroat trout

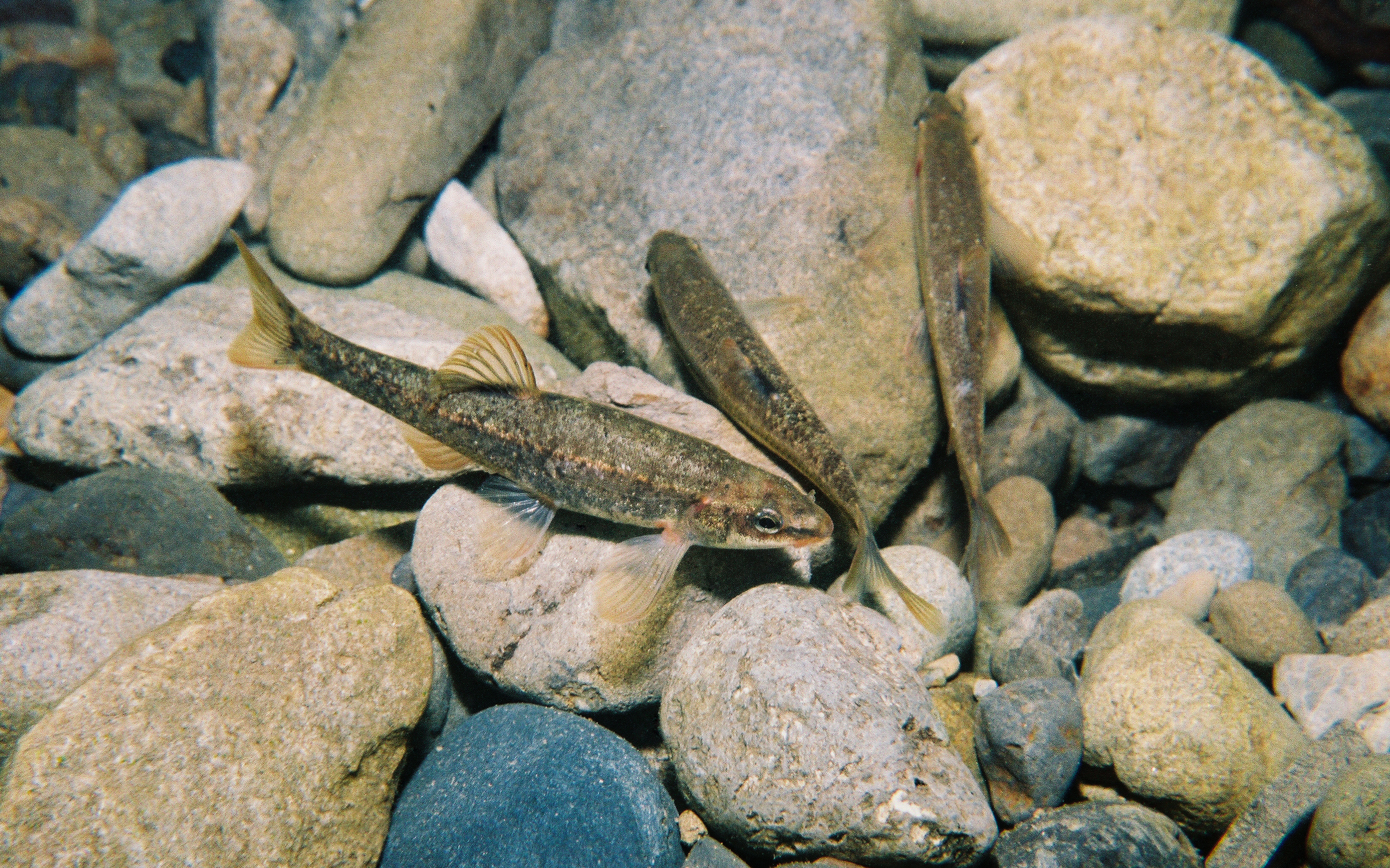
Speckled dace

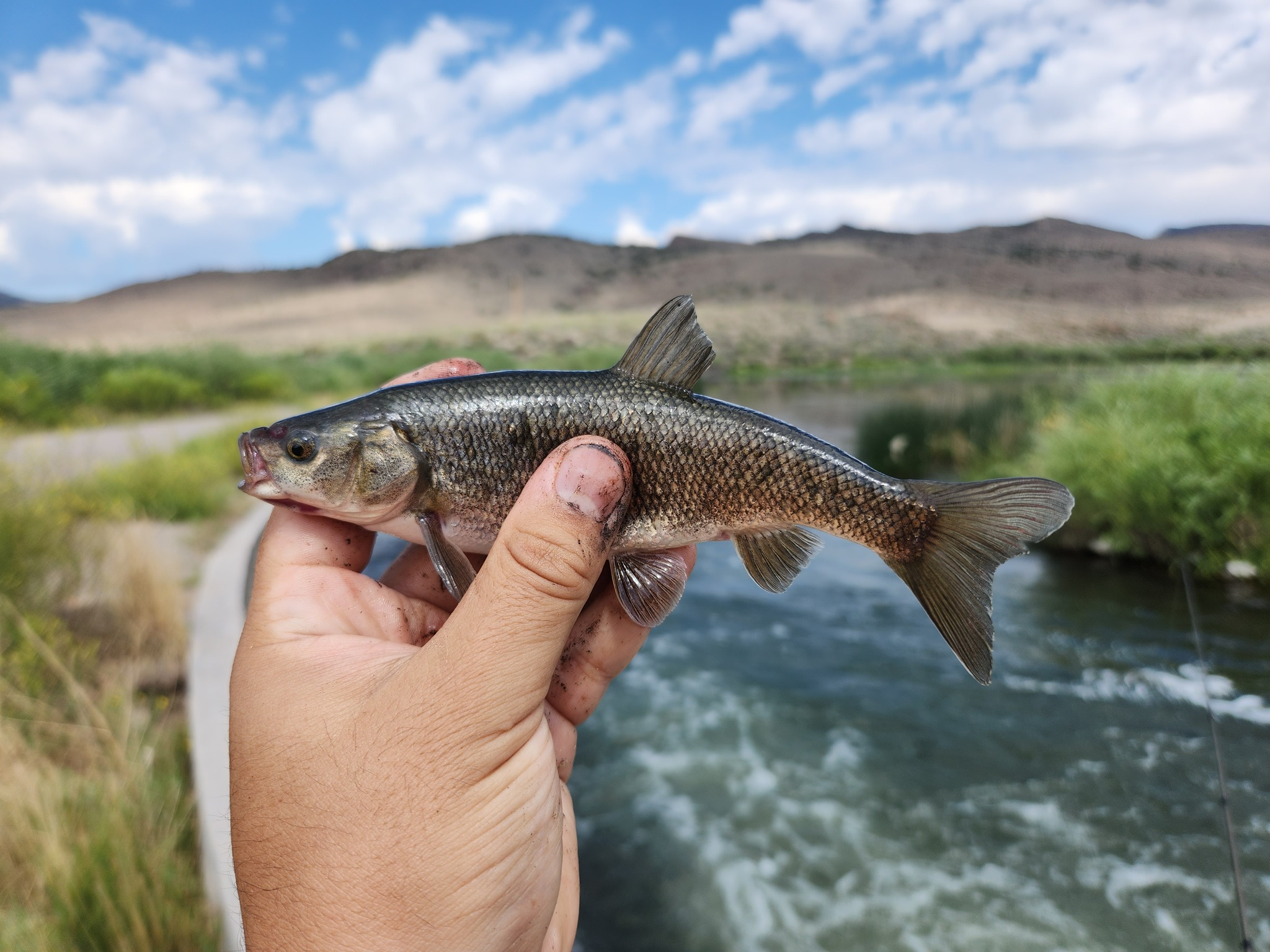
Utah chub

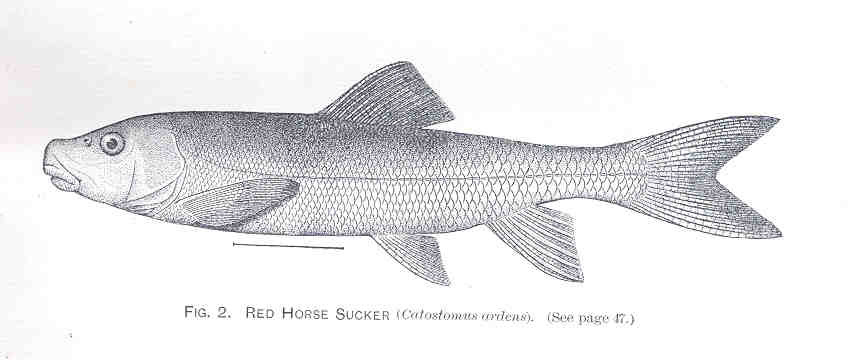
Utah sucker

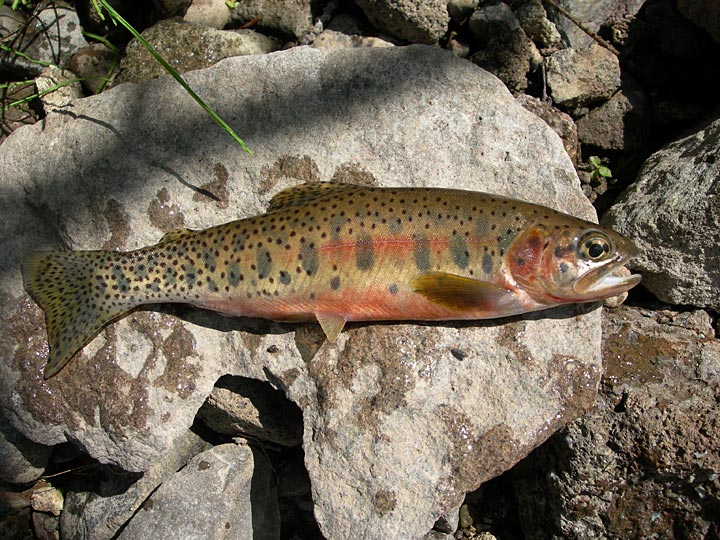
Westslope cutthroat trout

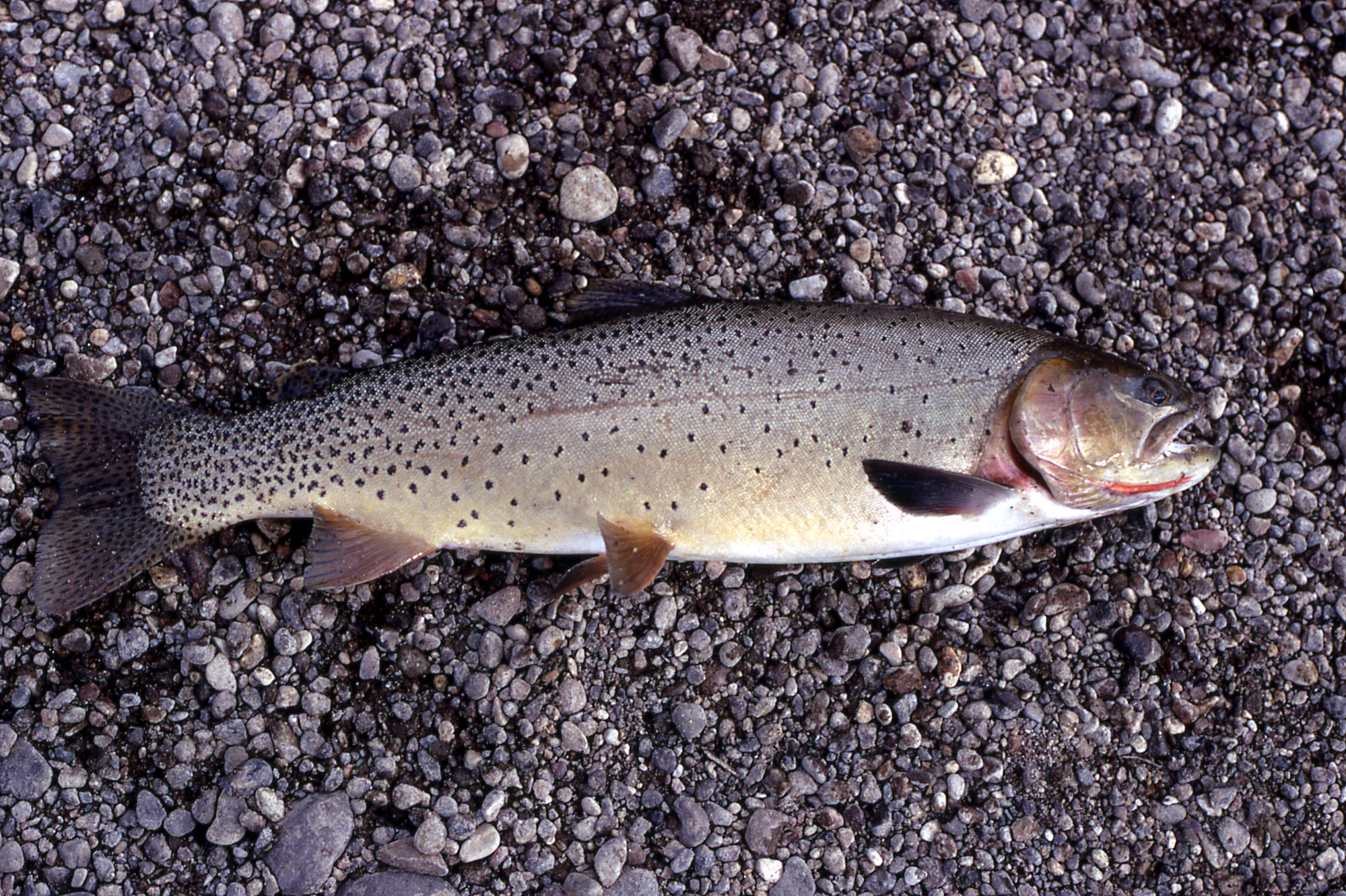
Yellowstone cutthroat trout

=== Arctic grayling ===
The Arctic grayling (Thymallus arcticus montanus) was originally distributed throughout the Madison River drainage below Firehole Falls and Gibbon Falls and the Gallatin River drainage. Introductions of brown and rainbow trout into the Madison River drainage caused the extirpation of the grayling from these rivers.

Today, Arctic grayling exist as introduced populations in Grebe Lake, Wolf Lake in the Gibbon River drainage and Cascade Lake in the Yellowstone River drainage. They were introduced from Georgetown Lake near Anaconda, Montana in 1921. Grayling are occasionally caught by anglers or fisheries biologists in the Gibbon River, but all evidence is that these are escapees from Grebe or Wolf lakes.

=== Longnose sucker ===
The Longnose sucker (Catostomus catostomus grieus) is native to the Yellowstone River drainage below Yellowstone Falls. It occurs in the Lamar River, Slough Creek and Gardner River. It has been introduced into Yellowstone Lake and expanded its range into upper Yellowstone tributaries and lakes. The Longnose sucker is believed to be the longest-lived fish in the park, and that a 20-inch (51 cm), 3-pound (1.4 kg) fish might be as old as 25 years.

=== Mountain sucker ===
The mountain sucker (Catostomus platyrhynchus) is widely distributed in rivers and streams of Yellowstone's major drainages below the major waterfalls.

=== Utah sucker ===
The Utah sucker (Catostomus ardens) is native to Heart Lake, the Heart River drainage and probably the Snake River drainage in the park.

=== Longnose dace ===
The longnose dace (Rhinichthys cataractae) is widely distributed in all the major river systems in the park, to include Yellowstone Lake and its tributaries.

=== Speckled dace ===
The speckled dace (Rhinichthys osculus) only occurs west of the Continental Divide in the park restricting it to the Snake River including Heart Lake and Fall River drainages.

=== Mountain whitefish ===
The mountain whitefish (Prosopium williamsoni) is native to the park in the Madison River drainage, the Gallatin River drainage, the Yellowstone River below Knowles Falls, the Middle Creek tributary of the Shoshone River and the Snake River drainage. Attempts to introduce mountain whitefish into the Yellowstone River below Yellowstone Lake were unsuccessful. Native mountain whitefish survive very well in the presence of introduced trout species.

=== Mottled sculpin ===
The mottled sculpin (Cottus bairdi) is widely distributed in Yellowstone streams and rivers below the major falls. It occurs in the Fall River, Snake River, Shoshone River, Yellowstone River and Gallatin River drainages. With one exception, it occurs only below the major waterfall barriers on the Firehole (Firehole Falls), Yellowstone (Knowles Falls) and Fall river drainages. When the park waters were first surveyed in the 1880s–90s by biologists, they discovered a population of Mottled scuplin in the Gibbon River above Gibbon Falls, a water otherwise barren of fish. No scientific explanation for this has yet been developed.

=== Redside shiner ===
The redside shiner (Richardsonius balteatus hydrophlox) is native to Yellowstone in the Snake River drainage, most commonly in lakes and ponds. It may also be native to lakes in the Fall River drainage. In the 1950s it was introduced into Yellowstone Lake and occurs today along the entire shoreline and in tributaries and lakes of the upper Yellowstone River. It was also introduced into Lewis Lake and now occurs in Shoshone Lake as well. These introductions into non-native waters were not official and has been attributed to the release of shiners being used as bait by fishermen.

=== Snake River fine-spotted cutthroat trout ===
The Snake River fine-spotted cutthroat trout (Oncorhynchus clarki sp.) is one of three subspecies of cutthroat trout found in Yellowstone. As its name suggests, this species is found in the Snake River drainages of the park. Some fisheries scientists consider the Snake River subspecies the same as the Yellowstone subspecies.

=== Westslope cutthroat trout ===
The westslope cutthroat trout (Oncorhynchus clarki lewisi) was widely distributed in the Gallatin River and Madison River drainages when the park was created. Genetically pure populations of subspecies today are restricted to two drainages. Last Chance creek in the Gallatin River drainage contains an aboriginal population. The Oxbow/Geode stream complex creek in the Yellowstone River drainage contain a genetically pure, but not native population as a result of stocking done in 1922. The introduction of brown, rainbow and brook trout into its original ranges essentially extirpated the subspecies from park waters. The National Park Service has an extensive program aimed at reestablishing this subspecies within suitable waters in the park. In 2014 after poisoning out rainbow trout in the Goose Lake chain in the Midway Geyser Basin, park officials established a westslope cutthroat trout broodstock in Goose Lake.

In 2017 the NPS embarked on a multi-year native trout restoration project in the upper Gibbon watershed. Lakes (Grebe and Wolf) along with tributaries and the main stem of the Gibbon above Virginia Cascades have been poisoned with Rotenone to remove non-native rainbow, brown and brook trout as well as non-native lacustrine Arctic grayling from the watershed. When the removal is complete, the NPS will stock native westslope cutthroat trout and fluvial Arctic grayling in the upper Gibbon watershed to create a refuge for these species in the park. Although labeled a restoration project, neither species were indigenous to the upper Gibbon watershed.

=== Yellowstone cutthroat trout ===
The Yellowstone cutthroat trout (Oncorhynchus clarkii bouvieri) inhabits the Yellowstone River drainage from the headwaters to Yellowstone Lake north to the park boundary at Gardiner, MT to include the Lamar River drainage. It has been widely stocked in park lakes previously barren of fish. Prior to the introduction of non-native trout, the Yellowstone cutthroat was the primary quarry of anglers in the park. Fishing Bridge across the Yellowstone River at the outlet of Yellowstone Lake was a favorite location for catching cutthroats or observing their spawning behavior. Lake trout introduction into Yellowstone Lake has caused serious decline in the Yellowstone cutthroat trout population.

=== Utah chub ===
The Utah chub (Gila atraria) is native to the Snake River drainage in Yellowstone, most specifically Heart Lake. It was introduced in the 1950s–60s, most probably by bait fisherman, into the Lewis Lake and Shoshone Lake system. It is the most abundant species of fish in Lewis Lake.

Native species distribution maps
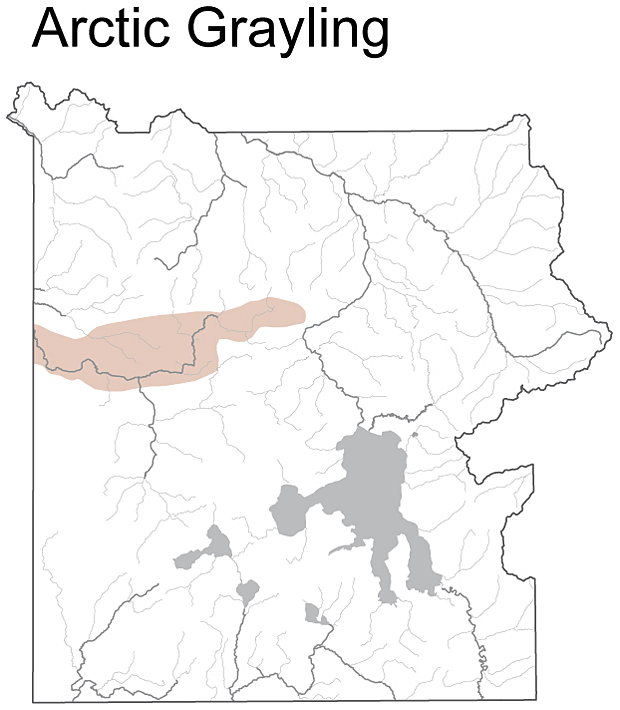
Arctic grayling

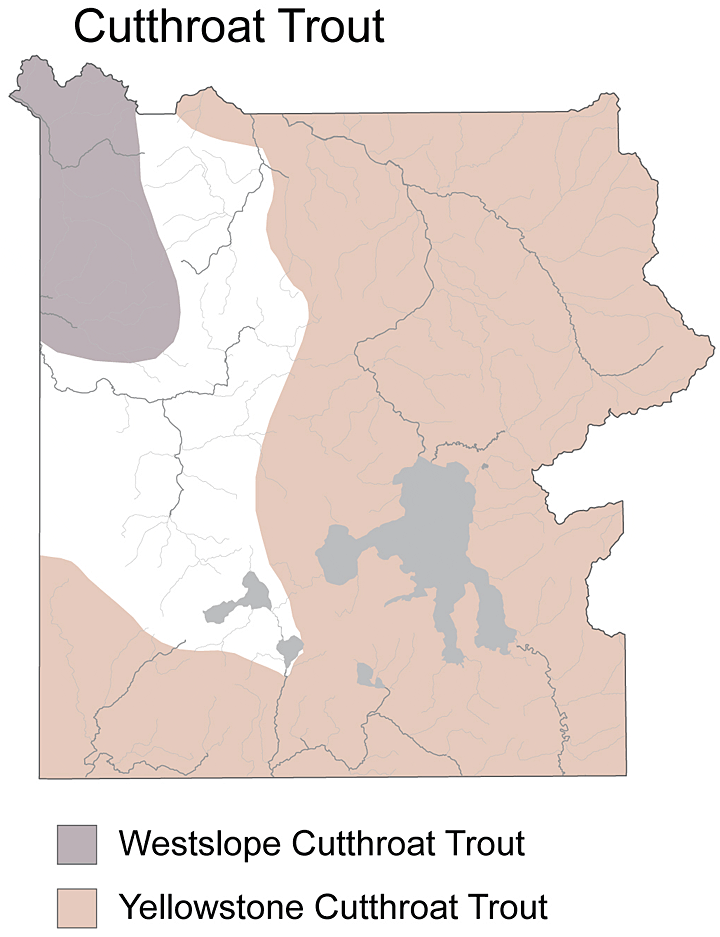
Cutthroat trout

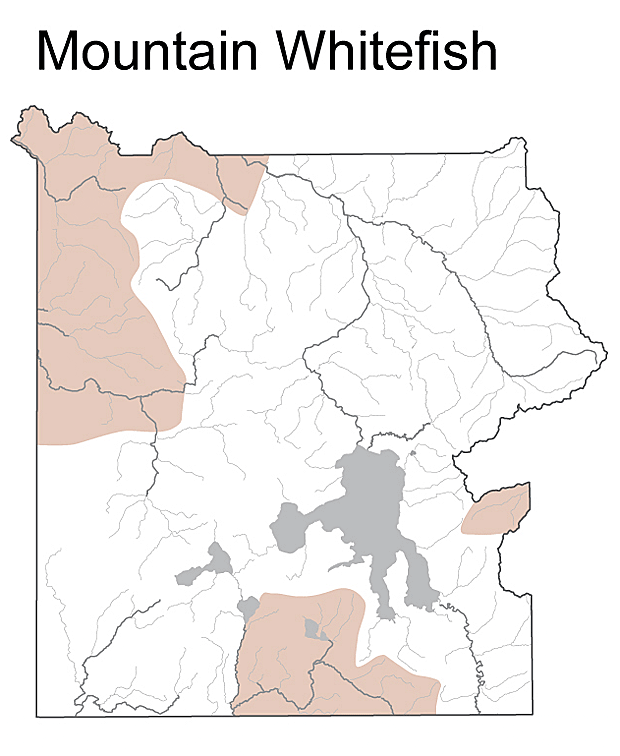
Mountain whitefish

== Non-native species ==
The following non-native species have been introduced into park waters, many of which were barren of fish. In many cases, these non-native species, when introduced into waters with native species have severely impacted the original range of native species.

Fish which are not native to Yellowstone
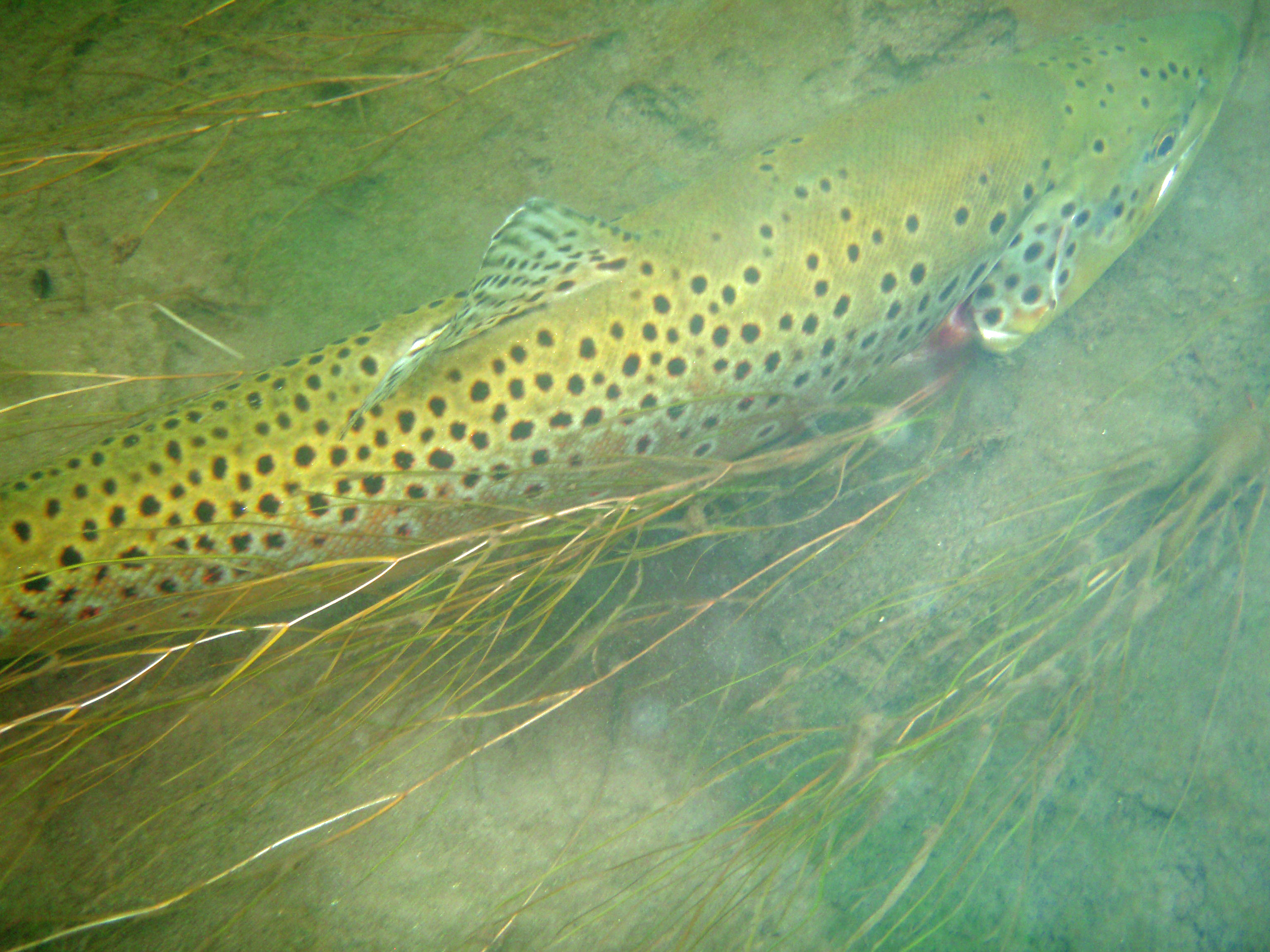
Madison River brown trout

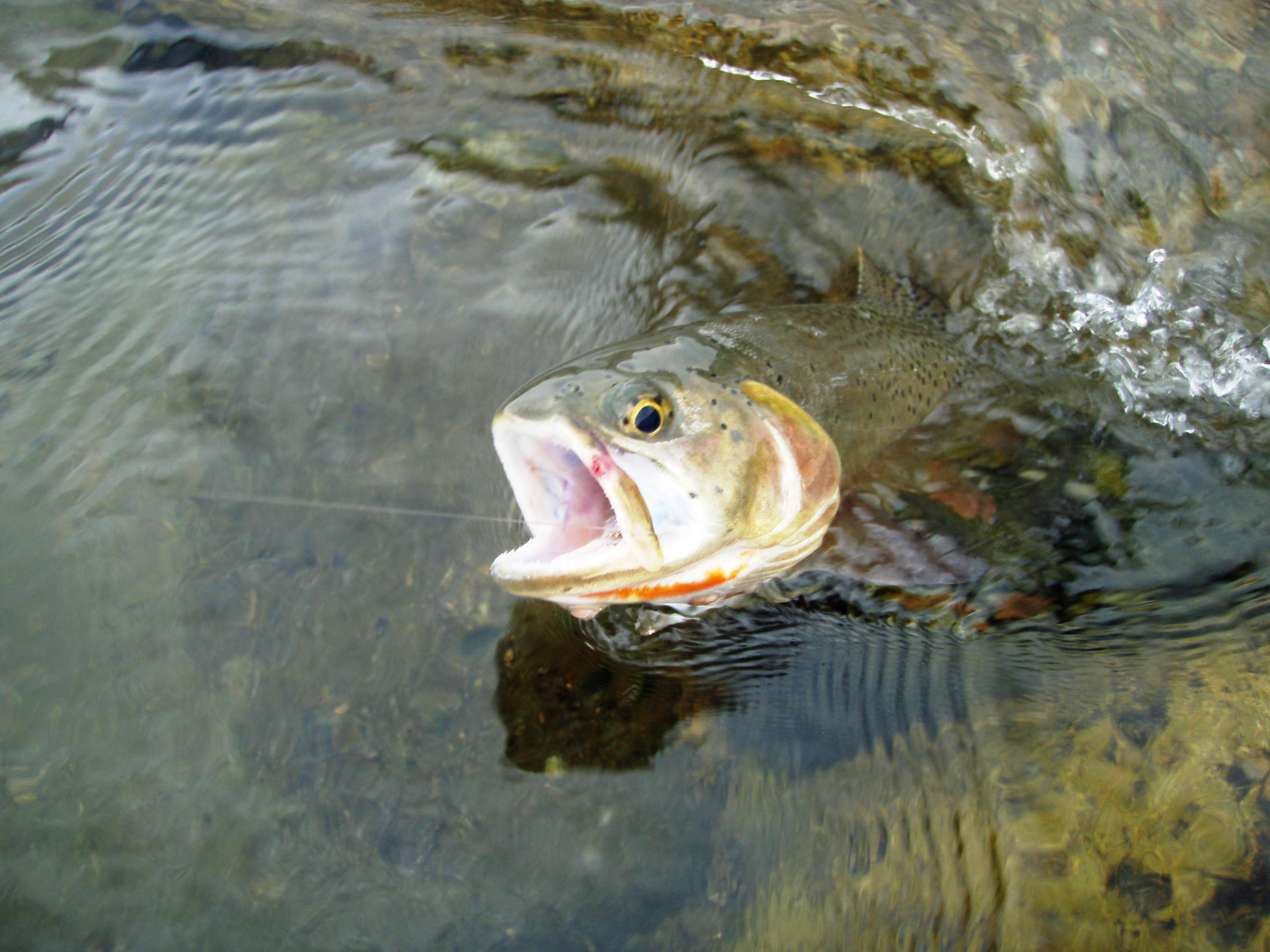
Cutbow from Gardner River

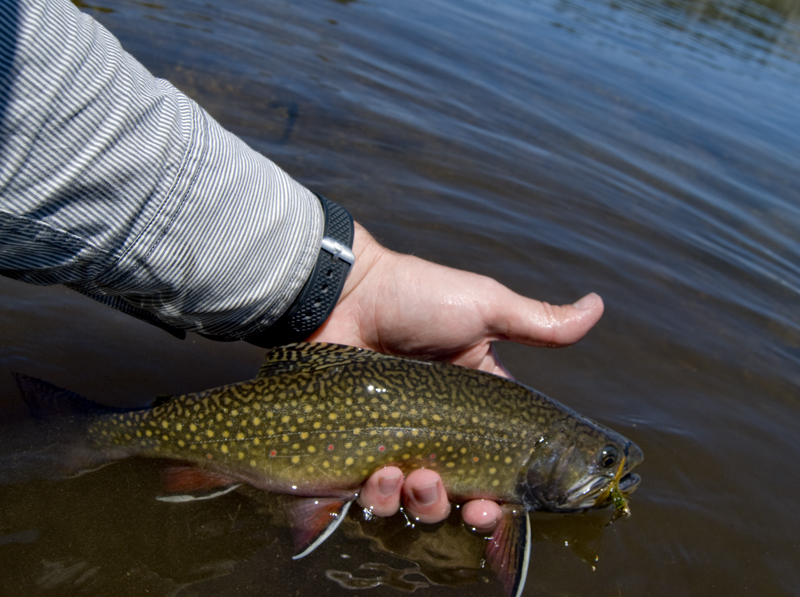
Brook trout

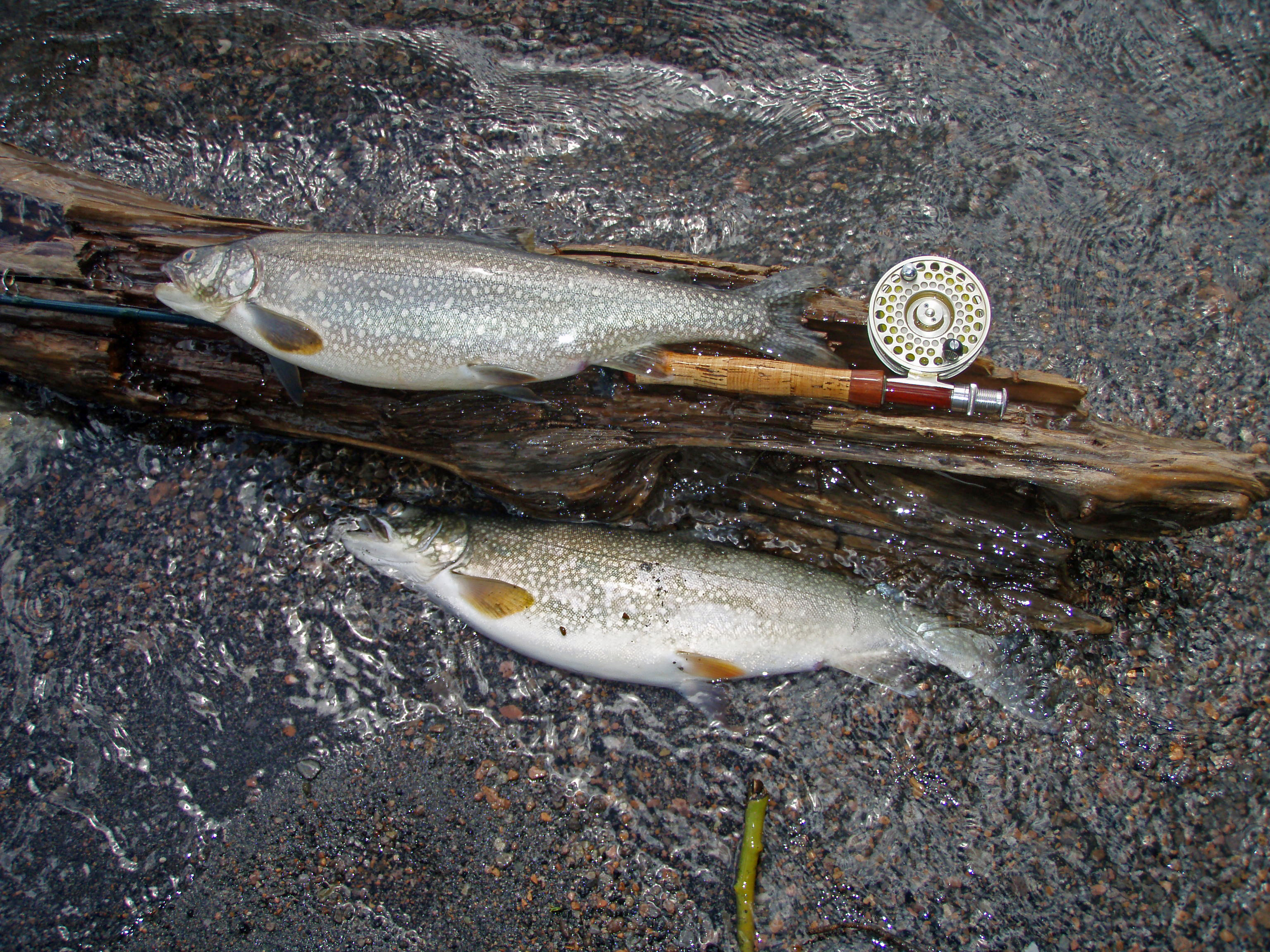
Lake trout, Yellowstone Lake

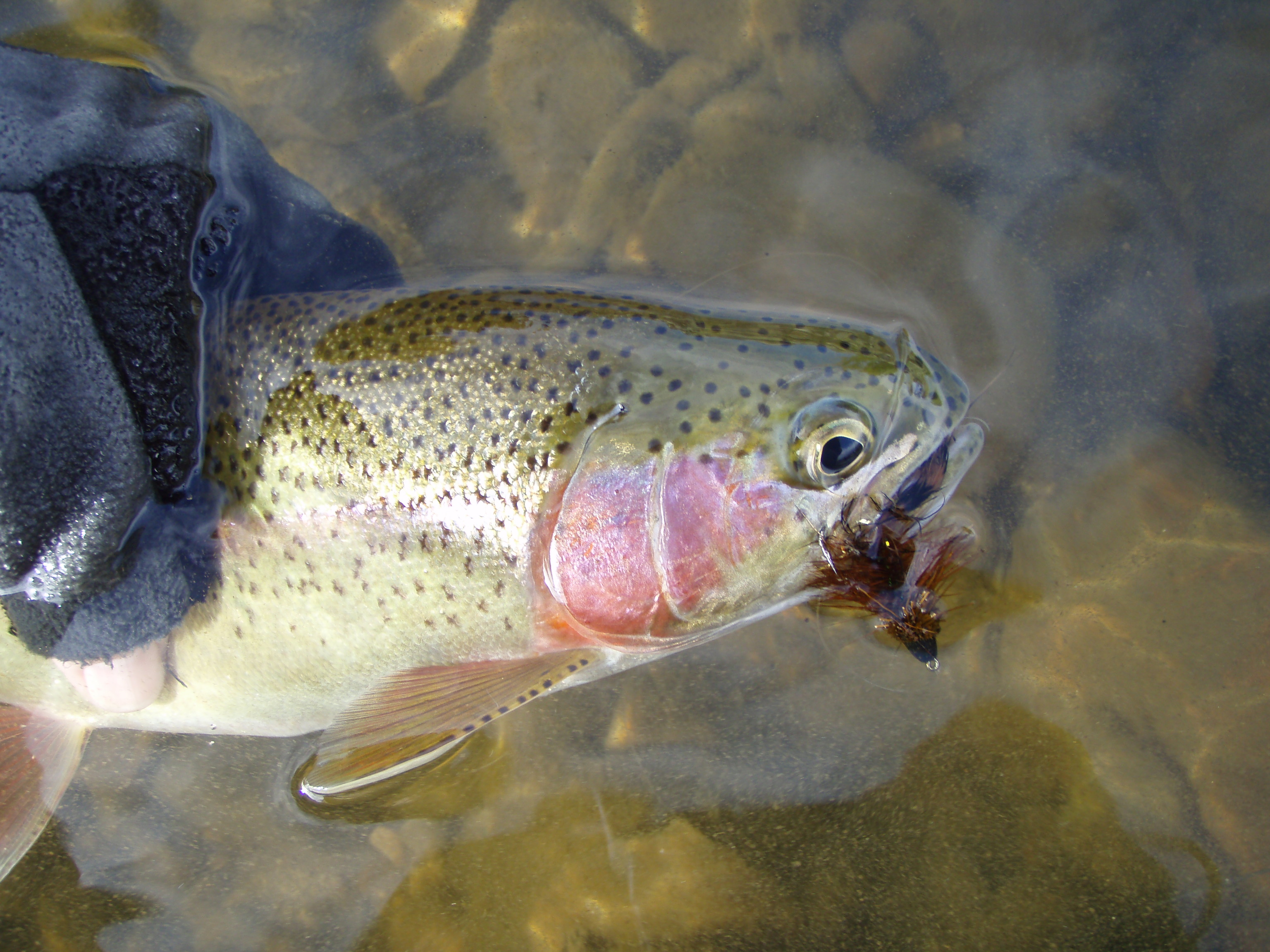
Rainbow trout

=== Brown trout ===
Brown trout (Salmo trutta) are not native to the United States. They were first introduced into the U.S. from Scotland, the Loch Leven strain, and from Germany, the Von Behr strain in 1882. Both strains were introduced into Yellowstone beginning in 1890. Shoshone and Lewis Lakes received plants in 1890. It was introduced into the Firehole River above and below Firehole Falls, the Madison River and the Gibbon River below Gibbon Falls in 1890. Brown trout also occur in the Yellowstone River below Knowles Falls, the Gardner River below Osprey Falls, in Middle Creek, a tributary of the Shoshone River and the Gallatin River. These populations resulted from upstream migrations by fish stocked in Wyoming and Montana. Brown trout do not exist in the Bechler River or Fall River drainages in the southwest corner of the park.

Brown trout are largely responsible for the extirpation of cutthroat trout and Arctic grayling from their original range in the Madison and Gallatin river drainages. Brown trout are the predominant species in the Madison River drainage and very popular with anglers. Spawning runs of large brown trout into the Madison River in the Fall from Hebgen Lake outside the park attract a large number of anglers.

=== Rainbow trout ===
Rainbow trout (Oncorhynchus mykiss), native to Pacific Ocean tributaries in North American and Asia was first introduced into the Gibbon River, above and below Gibbon Falls in 1890. In 1923, Rainbow trout were introduced into the Firehole River above Firehole Falls. Rainbow trout have also been introduced into a number of Yellowstone lakes. They exist in the Yellowstone River below Yellowstone Falls and in the upper Slough Creek drainage.

=== Rainbow-cutthroat hybrids ===
A cutbow (Oncorhynchus clarki × mykiss) is a fertile hybrid between a rainbow trout (Oncorhynchus mykiss) and a cutthroat trout (O. clarki). While cutbow hybrids may occur naturally, most native populations of rainbows and cutthroats were separated by geography or habitat. With the introduction of non-native rainbow trout into Yellowstone cutthroat habitat, cutbow hybridization has become a serious threat for native cutthroat populations due to genetic pollution. Cutbows occur in Yellowstone anywhere both species are present.

=== Brook trout ===
Brook trout (Salvelinus fontinalis) were widely stocked in park waters beginning in 1890. Preferring cooler water, brook trout were easily displaced by introduced brown and rainbow trout in the lower reaches of the major river systems. Today brook trout exist in the upper Firehole River above Kepler Cascades and in other Firehole tributaries like the Little Firehole River, Iron Spring and Sentinel Creeks. In the Gardner River drainage they are common above Osprey Falls. They also occur in many lakes and ponds. Brook trout are found in the Middle Creek drainage of the Shoshone River and tributaries of Shoshone Lake.

=== Lake trout ===
Lake trout (Salvelinus namaycush) were one of the first non-native species introduced into Yellowstone. They are also the largest fish species in the park growing to an average length of 20 inches (51 cm). In 1890 42,000 fingerlings were planted in Lewis Lake and Shoshone Lake at the time, barren of fish because of Lewis Falls. Sometime thereafter, they were also introduced into Heart Lake. Lake trout over 30 pounds (14 kg) have been caught in Lewis, Shoshone and Heart lakes. The park record is 42 pounds (19 kg) from Heart Lake in 1931.

In 1994, lake trout were discovered in Yellowstone Lake and were believed to have been either accidentally or intentionally introduced as early as 1989 with fish taken from Lewis Lake. The introduction of lake trout into Yellowstone Lake has caused a serious decline in the Yellowstone cutthroat trout population and the National Park Service has an aggressive lake trout eradication program on the lake.

=== Lake chub ===
The lake chub (Couesius plumbeus), although native to the Missouri and Yellowstone river drainages in Montana and Wyoming, it is not native to Yellowstone. It was most likely introduced into Yellowstone Lake and McBride Lake and Abundance Lake in the Slough Creek drainage by bait fisherman. It is not common, but probably well established in the Slough Creek drainage.

Non-native species distribution maps
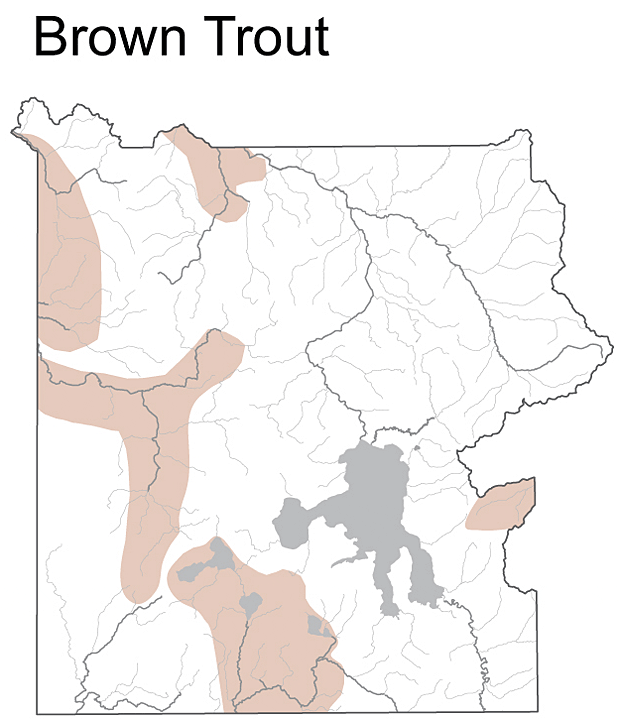
Brown trout

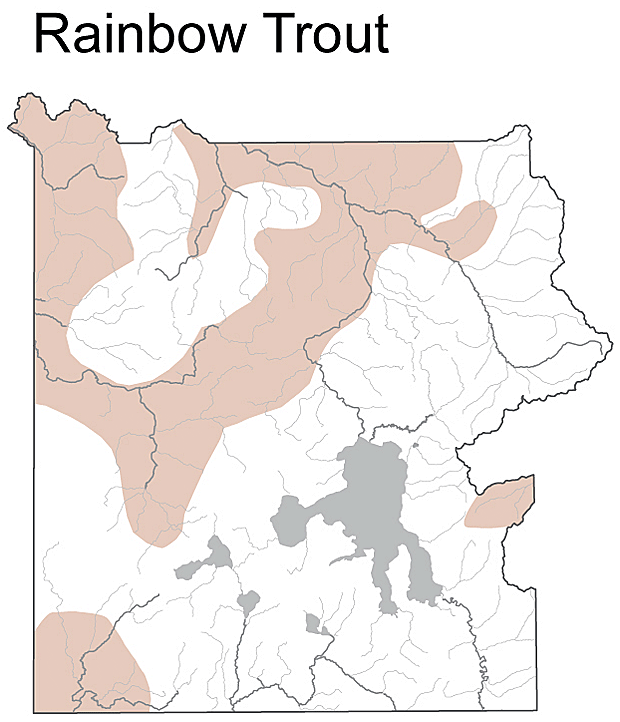
Rainbow trout

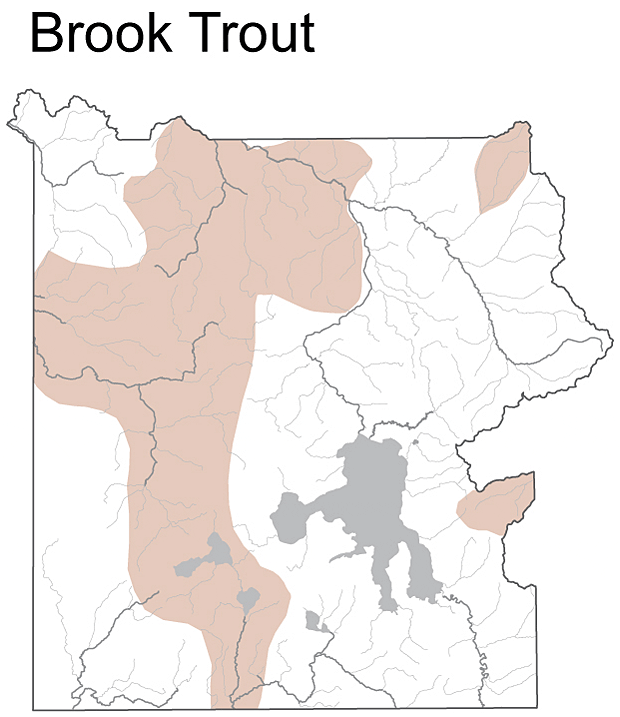
Brook trout

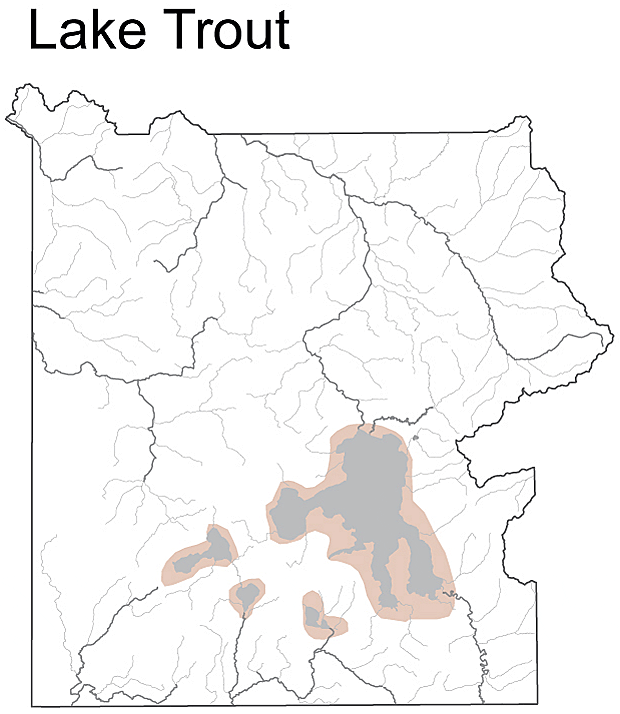
Lake trout

== Non-native species no longer in the park ==
The following species were introduced into park waters but did not establish viable populations (with the exception of the Yellow Perch). All these species no longer exist in Yellowstone.

Non-native species no longer in Yellowstone
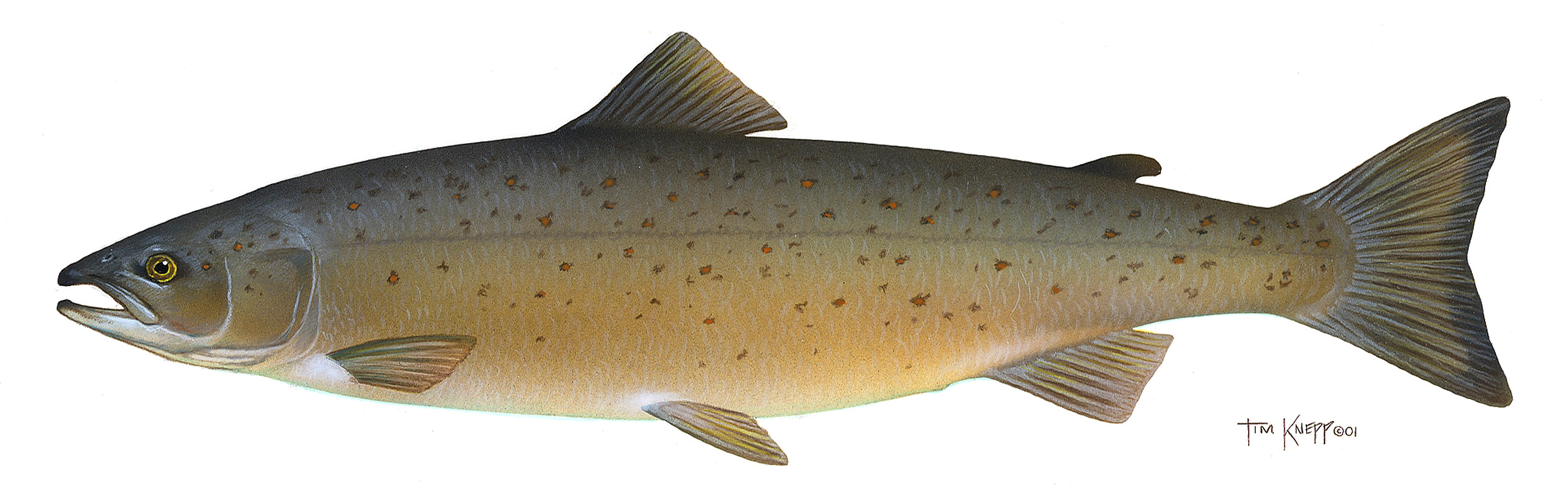
Atlantic salmon

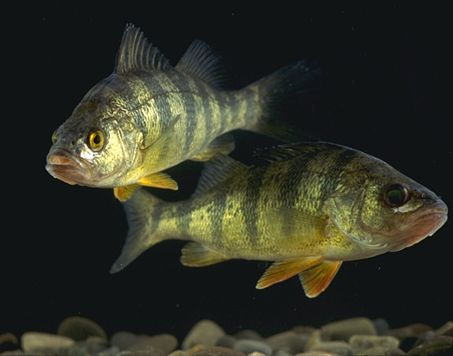
Yellow perch

=== Land-locked Atlantic salmon ===
In 1908 7,000 land-locked Atlantic salmon (Salmo salar) were stocked in Yellowstone Lake and 5,000 in Duck Lake (West Thumb). Neither of these introductions succeeded.

=== Largemouth bass – smallmouth bass ===
In 1893, 250 bass fingerlings were introduced into the Gibbon River (it is unknown as to whether these were large or smallmouth bass (Micropterus dolomieu)) and in the early 1900s, 500 fingerling largemouth bass' (Micropterus salmoides) were introduced into Goose Lake and Feather Lake in the Lower Geyser Basin. Neither introduction established a viable population.

=== Yellow perch ===
In the early 1900s, yellow perch (Perca flavescens) appeared in Goose Lake and other small lakes in the Lower Geyser Basin. It is believed they were either illegally introduced or were hitchhikers in official bass stocking. In 1938, fisheries managers poisoned Goose Lake and other locations known to contain Yellow perch. They do not exist in the park today.

== See also ==
- Animals of Yellowstone
- Angling in Yellowstone National Park
