= Grebe Lake =

Lake in the American state of Wyoming

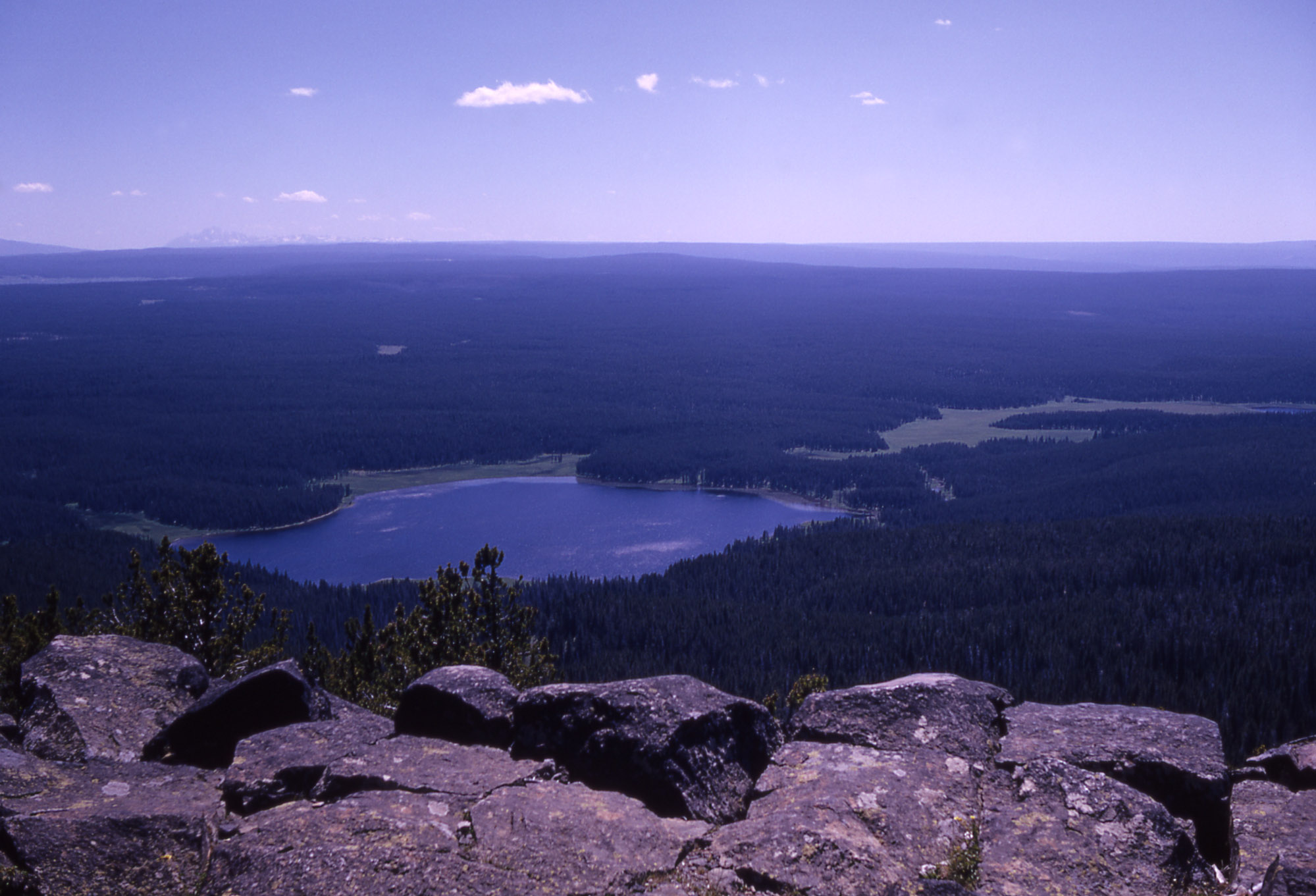
- As seen from Observation Peak, 1964

- Location within Wyoming Location within the United States
- Location: Yellowstone National Park, Park County, Wyoming, US
- Coordinates: 44°45′03″N 110°33′31″W
- Primary outflows: Gibbon River
- Basin countries: United States
- Max. length: .75 miles (1.21 km)
- Max. width: .75 miles (1.21 km)
- Surface area: 156 acres (0.63 km^{2})
- Surface elevation: 8,023 feet (2,445 m)

Grebe Lake is a 156 acres (0.63 km^{2}) backcountry lake in Yellowstone National Park most noted for its population of Arctic grayling. Grebe Lake comprises the headwaters of the Gibbon River. Grebe Lake is located approximately 3.1 miles (5.0 km) north of the Norris-Canyon section of the Grand Loop Road. The trail to the lake passes through mostly level Lodgepole Pine forest and open meadows. The lake was named by J.P. Iddings, a geologist with the Arnold Hague geologic surveys. There are four backcountry campsites located on the lake.

== Arctic grayling ==
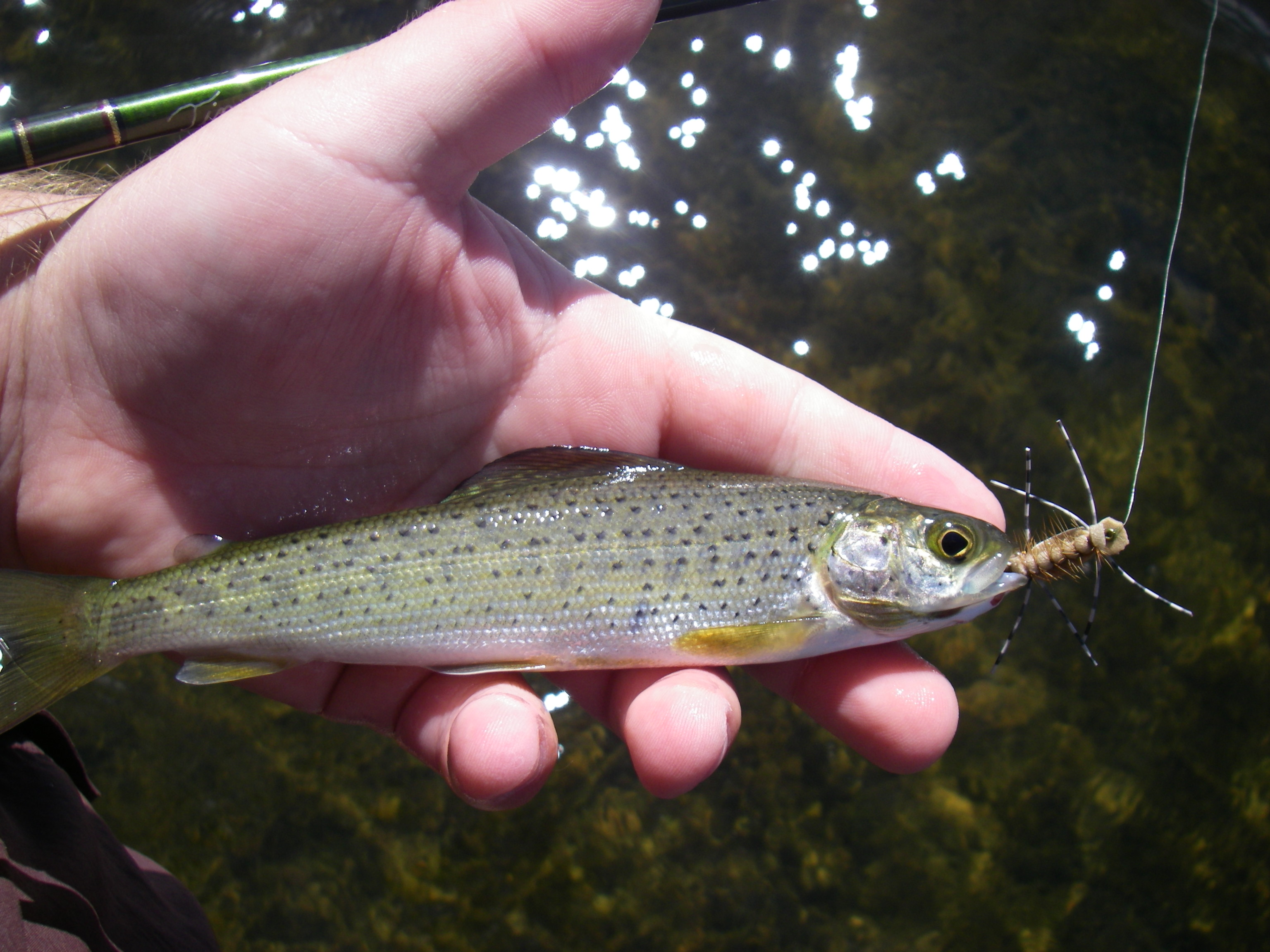
Grebe Lake Grayling

In 1921, U.S. Fish Commission personnel stocked Grebe Lake, at that time fishless, with the Montana strain Thymallus arcticus montanus of a lacustrine form of Arctic Grayling. The original stocks came from Georgetown Lake near Anaconda, Montana. The fluvial form of Arctic Grayling was native to the Madison and Gibbon Rivers below Gibbon Falls. In an effort to re-establish grayling in western states, over 72 million grayling eggs were harvested from Grebe Lake between 1931 and 1956 and distributed to hatcheries. Most lake dwelling grayling in the west today can be genetically traced to the Grebe Lake stocks. Grebe Lake was closed to fishing until 1944 because of the fish culture operations at the lake. Wolf Lake 2 miles (3.2 km) west and Cascade Lake 3 miles (4.8 km) east also contain grayling.

== Angling ==
Grebe Lake used to hold both lacustrine arctic grayling and rainbow trout. In 2017, the NPS embarked on a three-year fish restoration project in the upper Gibbon river watershed to remove all non-native trout and grayling. Grebe lake and its tributaries were poisoned with rotenone in the summer of 2017 to remove the grayling and rainbow trout. Westslope cutthroat trout and fluvial arctic grayling were planted in the lake. Both are native to the Gibbon watershed below Gibbon Falls but not indigenous to the upper Gibbon watershed. The NPS hopes to establish a refuge for these species in the upper Gibbon watershed.

The lake is a popular summer angling destination for park visitors. Although the lake can be fished from shore, many anglers carry in float tubes to access the deeper portions of the lake. Using a float tube on Yellowstone lakes requires a park service boating permit. The lake is open to angling during the entire Yellowstone season (end of May to early November) but generally cannot be easily accessed until mid June because of snow on the trail. The trailhead to Grebe Lake is approximately 4 miles (6.4 km) west of Canyon on the Norris to Canyon road 44°43′3″N 110°32′58″W.

Images of Grebe Lake
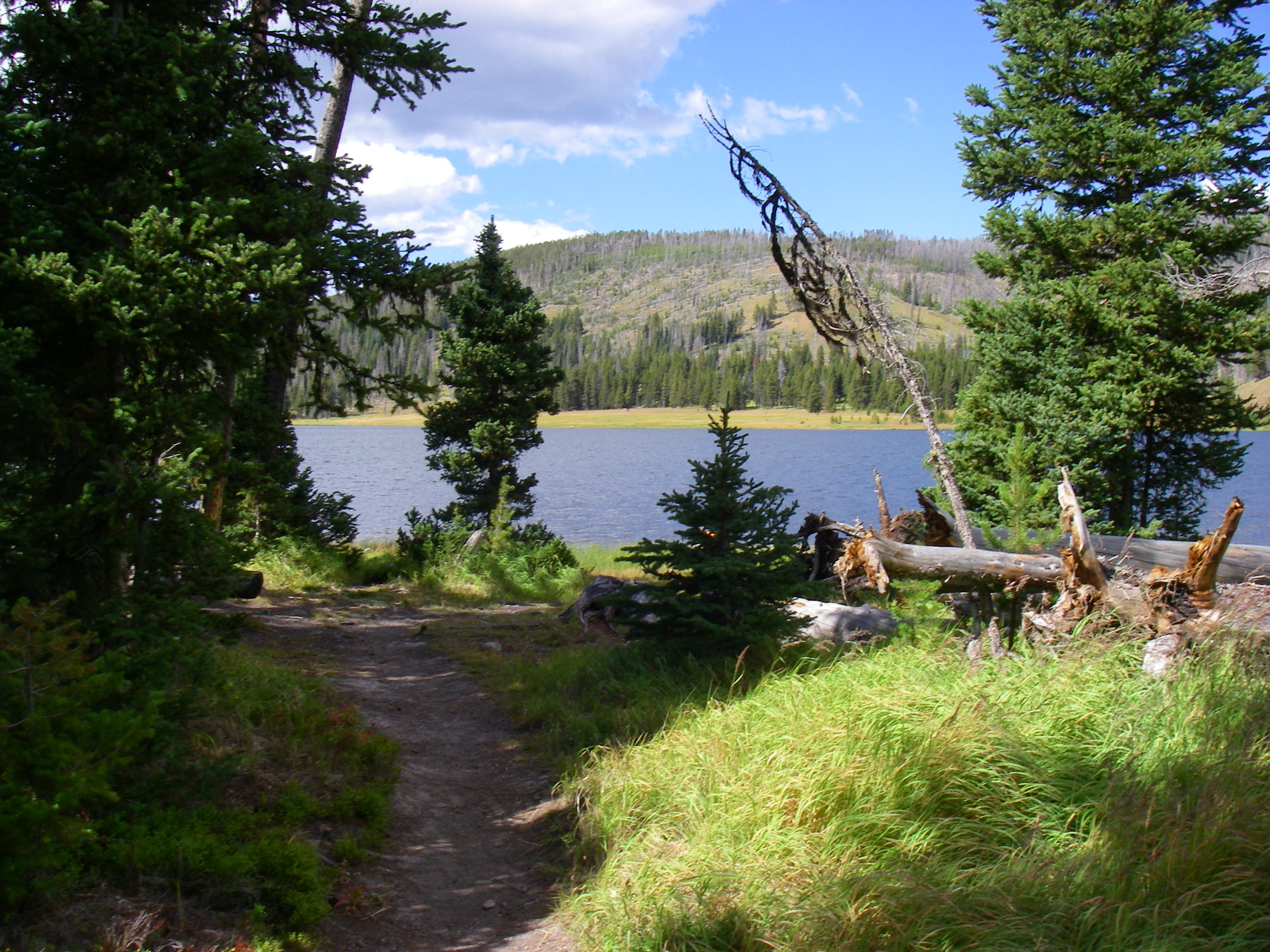
Trail approach to Grebe Lake, 2009

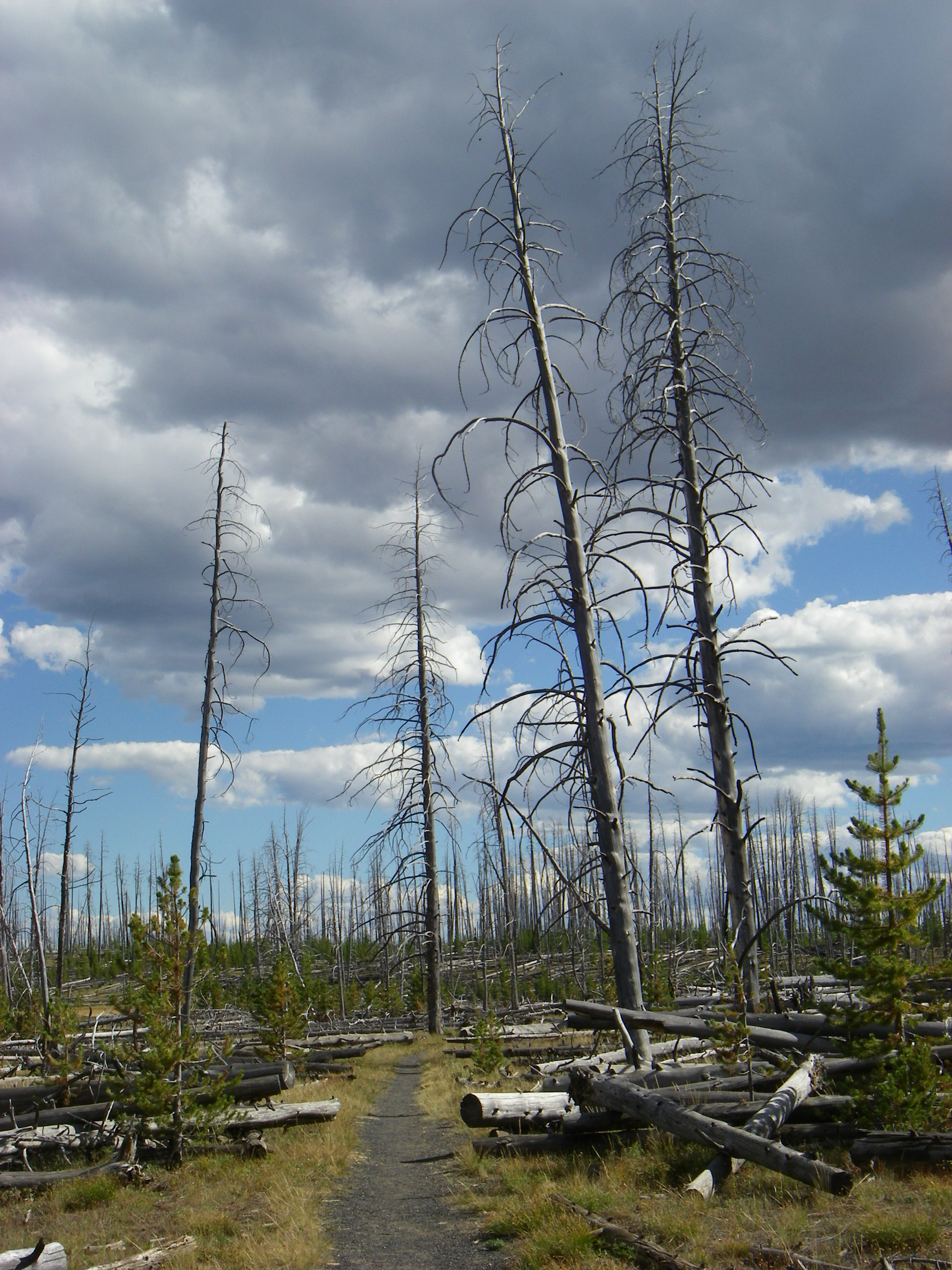
Grebe Lake trail, Summer 2009

== See also ==
- Angling in Yellowstone National Park
- Fishes of Yellowstone National Park
