= Firehole Falls =

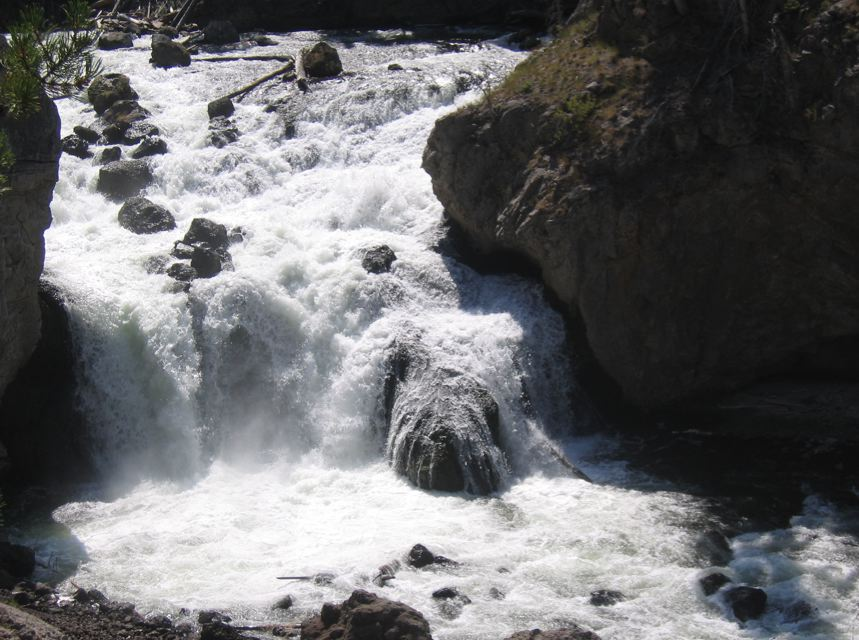
- Firehole Falls
- Interactive map of Firehole Falls
- Location: Yellowstone National Park, WY, US
- Coordinates: 44.63083°N 110.86361°W
- Type: Cascade
- Total height: 40 feet (12 m)
- Number of drops: 1
- Watercourse: Firehole River

Firehole Falls is a waterfall on the Firehole River in southwestern Yellowstone National Park in the United States. The falls are located approximately 0.5 miles (0.80 km) upstream from the confluence of the Firehole and Gibbon Rivers at Madison Junction. Firehole Falls has a drop of approximately 40 feet (12 m). The falls are located within Firehole Canyon on Firehole Canyon Drive, a one-way road that parallels the main Madison Junction to Old Faithful road.

== History ==
Lt. Gustavus C. Doane, U.S. Army, a member of the Washburn-Langford-Doane Expedition described the falls in his 1871 report to the Secretary of War:

Following down the river bank through a deep cañon of volcanic rocks, in many places broken in huge fragments, we presently came to rapids, having a fall of perhaps 40 feet in a half mile. At this point the channel narrows to 150 feet, and is shut in by perpendicular rocks. We were obliged to scale the ridge above, and follow down the steam on its summit, through dense timber and steep ravines, with considerable difficulty. In three miles we reached a level bottom, on the river, at the junction of a large creek coming in from the northeast. Camped at the junction. Distance 18 miles.

Although the falls were commented on in the Washburn and Hayden explorations, there is no historical record as to how they got their name. By the mid-1880s, they were routinely referred to as Firehole Falls in both government and commercial accounts of the park.

== Barrier to fish migration ==
When the Washburn party traveled through the Firehole River geyser basins in 1870, the river above Firehole Falls was barren of fish, the falls being a natural barrier to upstream migration. Unlike the Yellowstone River drainage, the upper Firehole was isolated from any connection to drainages on the Pacific slope. The absence of fish was overcome in 1889 when the first brook trout were introduced into the river above the falls. In 1890 brown trout were introduced into Nez Perce creek a Firehole tributary and in the 1920s, rainbow trout were introduced into the river. Today, the falls still block upstream migrations of spawning trout from the Madison River, but the upper Firehole has become a world class trout fishery because of these introductions.

Images of Firehole Falls
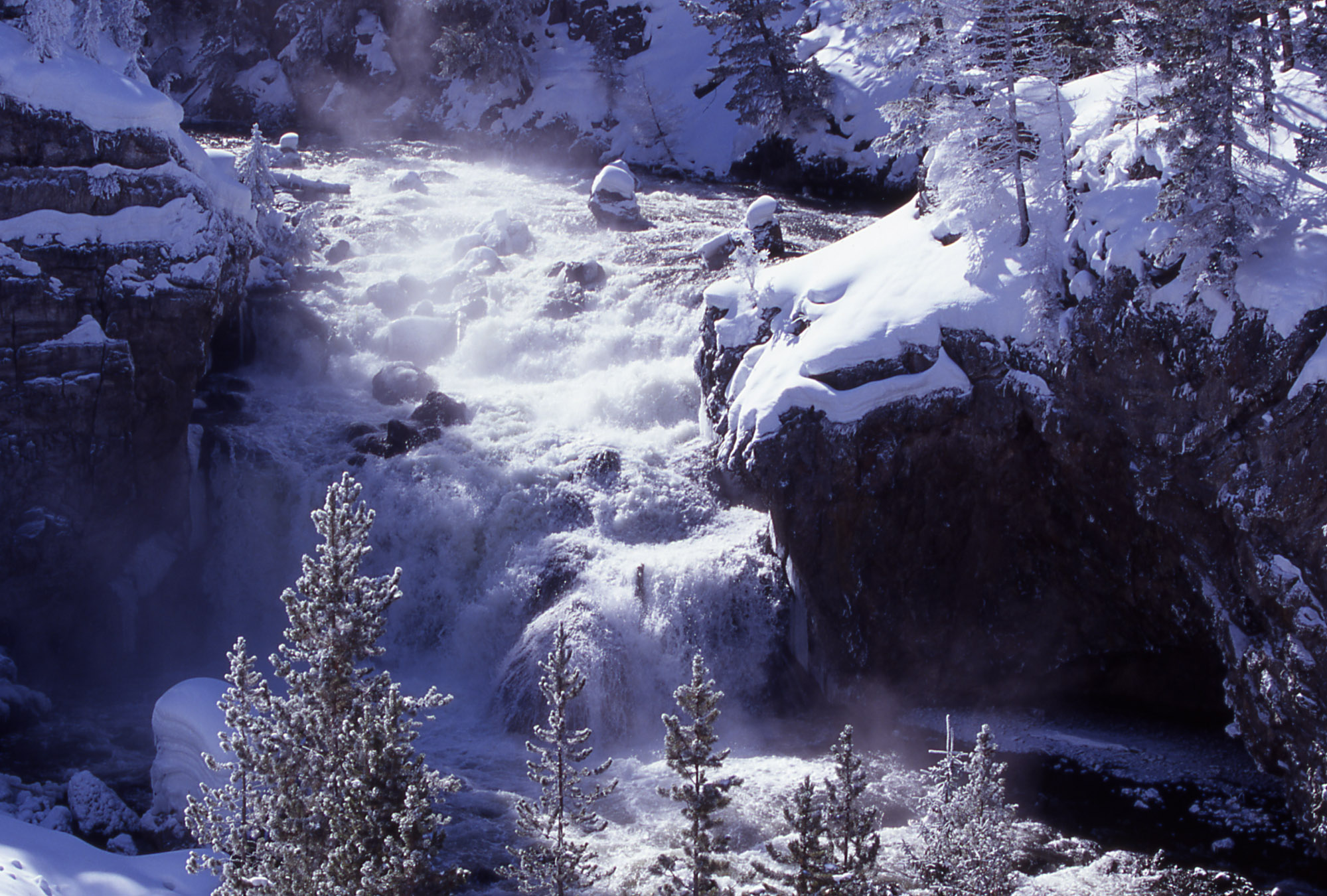
Firehole Falls, Winter 1998

== See also ==
- Waterfalls in Yellowstone National Park
