= Virginia Cascades =

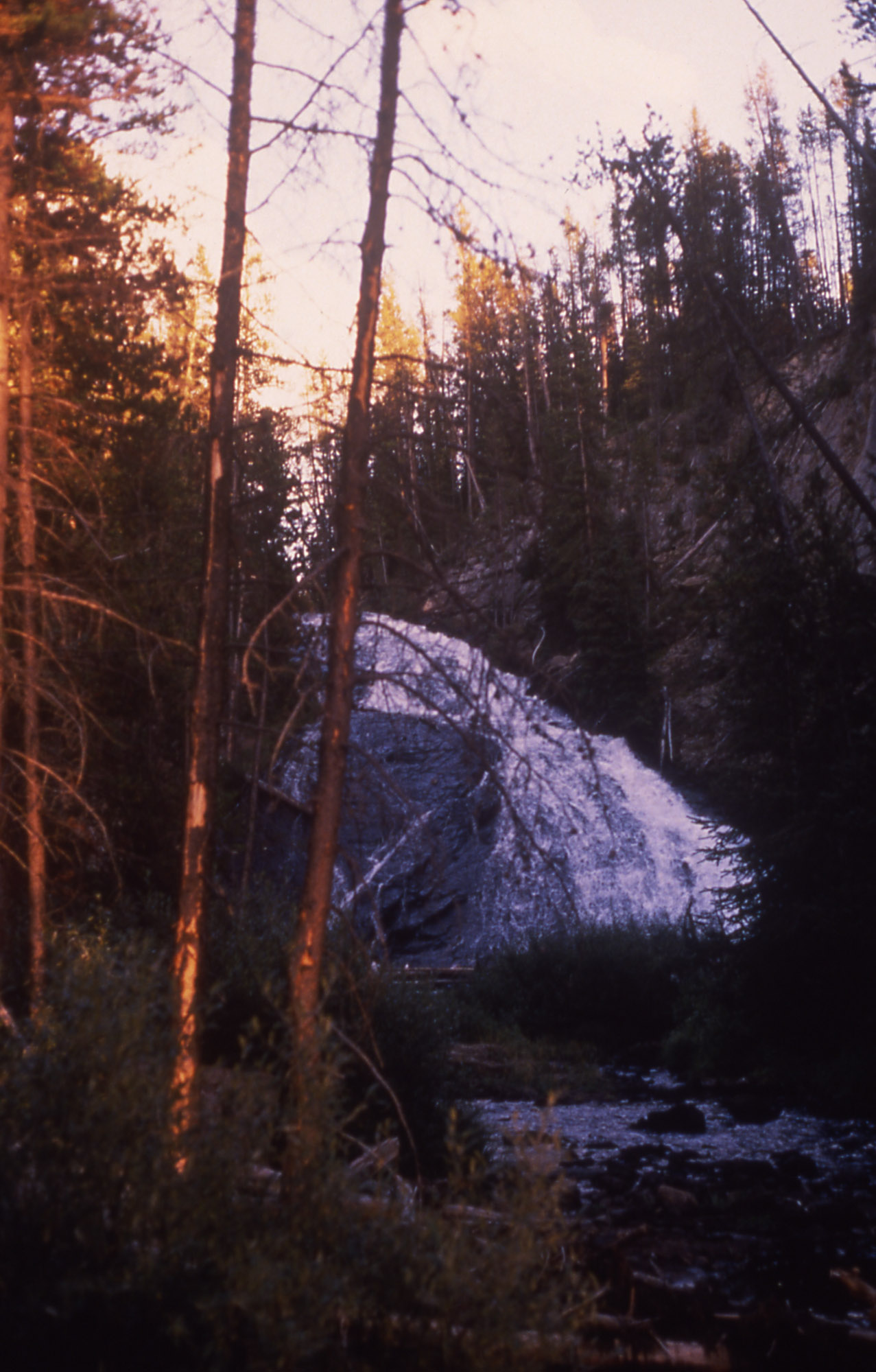
- September 1989
- Interactive map of Virginia Cascades
- Location: Yellowstone National Park, Park County, Wyoming
- Coordinates: 44°42′47″N 110°38′46″W
- Type: Cascade
- Total height: 60 feet (18 m)
- Watercourse: Gibbon River

Virginia Cascades (height 60 feet (18 m)), is a cascade type waterfall on the Gibbon River in Yellowstone National Park. Virginia Cascades is located just south of the Norris-Canyon road approximately 2.5 miles (4.0 km) east of Norris Junction. A one-way road provides access to the north side of the cascades.

Virginia Cascades was named in 1886 to honor Virginia Gibson, the wife of Charles Gibson, the head of the Yellowstone Park Association concessions by Ed Lamartine who built the first wagon road between Norris and Canyon. In 1880, then superintendent Philetus Norris had named the cascades, Norris Falls but geologist Arnold Hague, although he did not like to give personal names to scenic features, agreed to the name Virginia Cascades because he thought it useful to name park features after states in the union.

== See also ==
- List of waterfalls
- Waterfalls in Yellowstone National Park
