= Gibbon River =

River in Wyoming, United States

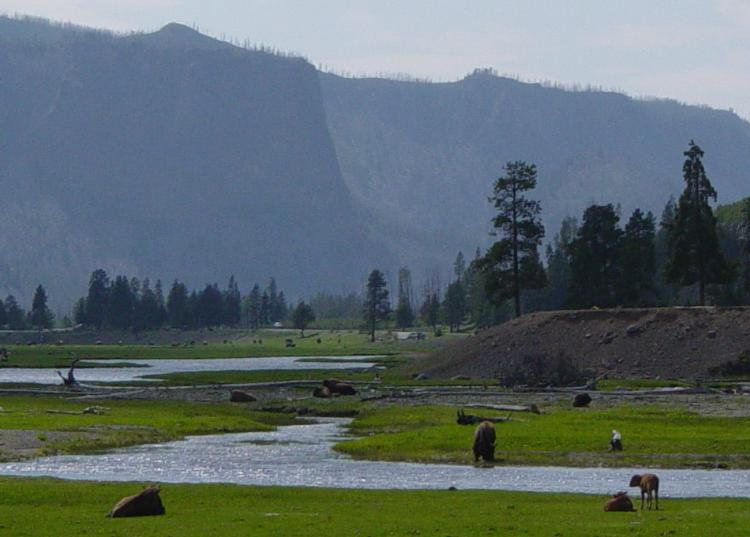
- Bison grazing near the Gibbon River in Yellowstone National Park

Location
- Country: United States
- State: Wyoming
- County: Teton County
- Region: Yellowstone National Park

Physical characteristics
- Source
  - coordinates: 44°45′10″N 110°33′57″W
  - elevation: 6,795 feet (2,071 m)
- Mouth
  - coordinates: 44°38′32″N 110°51′56″W
- Length: ~25 miles (40 km)
- Basin size: 126 mi^{2} (330 km^{2})
- Discharge
  - location: Madison Junction
  - average: 127 cubic feet per second (3.6 m^{3}/s)

Basin features
- River system: Missouri River

The Gibbon River flows east of the Continental Divide in Yellowstone National Park, in northwestern Wyoming, the Northwestern United States. Along with the Firehole River, it is a major tributary of the Madison River, which itself is a tributary of the Missouri River.

== Description ==
The Gibbon River rises in the center of the park at Grebe Lake. It flows for a short distance into Wolf Lake. Below Wolf Lake, the river flows through Virginia Cascades into the Norris valley. It flows near the Norris Geyser Basin and through the Gibbon Geyser Basin. From there it flows through the Gibbon River Canyon to its confluence with the Firehole River to form the Madison River. Early maps listed the river as Gibbons Fork or the East Fork of the Madison River. The river between Norris and Madison Junction is paralleled by the Grand Loop Road. The river, along with Gibbon Falls, is named for Colonel John Gibbon, U.S. Army who participated in the 1872 Hayden Geological Survey of Yellowstone.

== Angling ==
The Gibbon River is a popular trout fishing destination. The upper section of river has very difficult access being choked with thick forests and much downed timber. The fish, consisting of brook trout, rainbow trout and grayling, are all on the small side, rarely exceeding 10 inches (250 mm). Below Gibbon Falls access is excellent and the river has a healthy mix of rainbow and brown trout. The lower river receives a good run of spawning browns in the fall.

The Gibbon River is fly fishing only and catch and release below Gibbon Falls. Above the falls, any grayling or cutthroat trout caught must be released. An unlimited number of brook, rainbow or brown trout may be harvested daily in the waters above the falls.

== Native trout restoration ==
In 2017 the NPS embarked on a multi-year native trout restoration project in the upper Gibbon watershed. Lakes (Grebe and Wolf) along with tributaries and the main stem of the Gibbon above Virginia Cascades have been poisoned with Rotenone to remove non-native rainbow, brown and brook trout as well as non-native lacustrine arctic grayling from the watershed. When the removal is complete, the NPS will stock native westslope cutthroat trout and fluvial Arctic grayling in the upper Gibbon watershed to create a refuge for these species in the park. Although labeled a restoration project, neither species were indigenous to the upper Gibbon watershed.

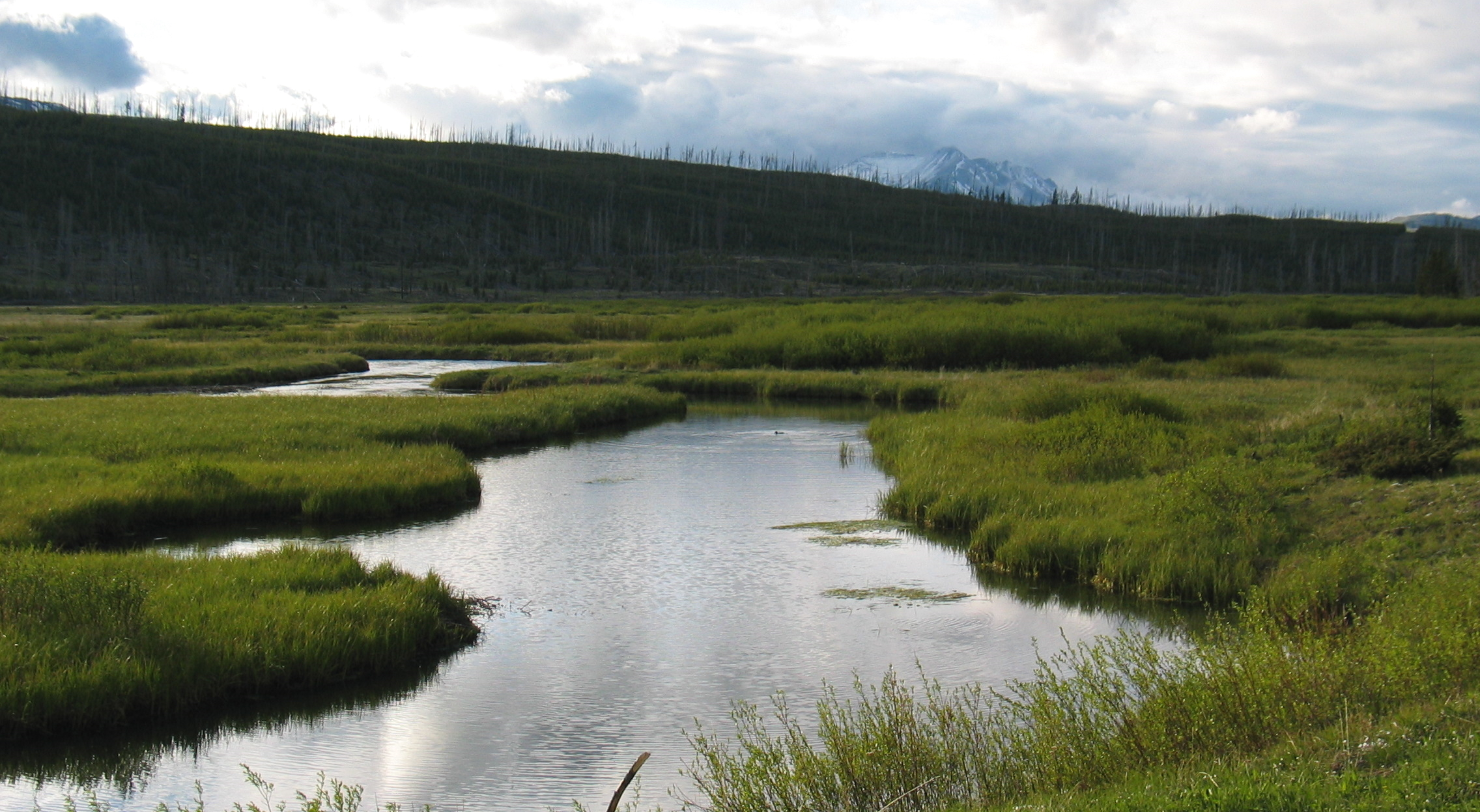
Gibbon River bottomlands, Yellowstone National Park

== The Gibbon Meadows wolf pack ==
In late 2003, the Yellowstone Wolf Project noted the formation of a group of 5 wolves, consisting of members of the Cougar Creek and Nez Perce Pack, in the Gibbon Meadows-Norris Area of the park. Their recognition as a wolf pack was attributed following the successful reproduction of the group in 2004, raising 2 pups to year end. The pack emigrated out of the national park into the Centennial Mountains of Montana and Idaho by 2010.

== See also ==
- Gibbon Falls
- Grand Loop Road Historic District
- Angling in Yellowstone National Park
- Fishes of Yellowstone National Park
- Tributaries of the Missouri River
