= Gibbon Falls =

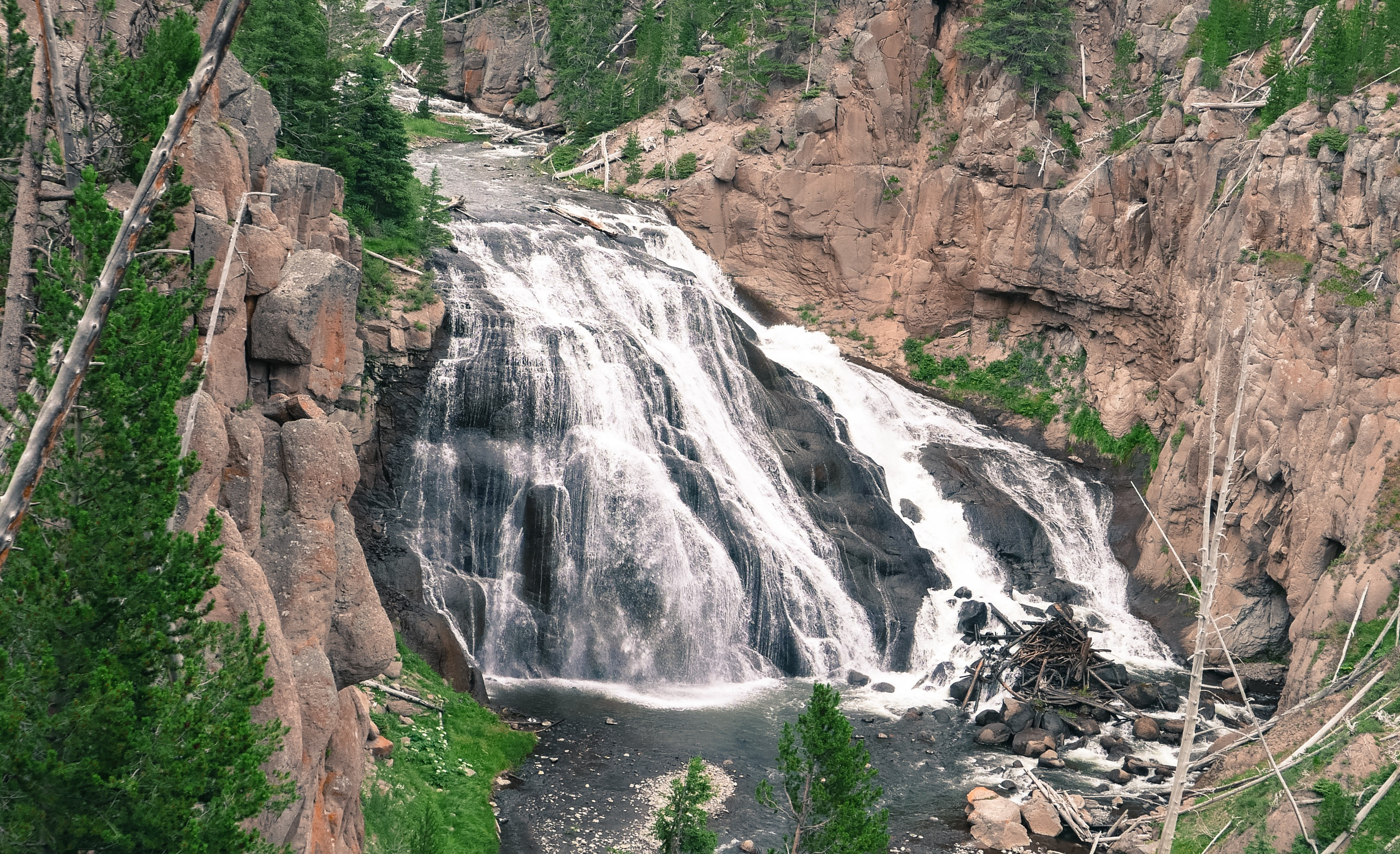
- Interactive map of Gibbon Falls
- Location: Yellowstone National Park, WY, US
- Coordinates: 44.653825°N 110.77114°W
- Type: Cascade
- Total height: 84 feet (26 m)
- Number of drops: 1
- Watercourse: Gibbon River

Gibbon Falls is a waterfall on the Gibbon River in northwestern Yellowstone National Park in the United States. Gibbon Falls has a drop of approximately 84 feet (26 m). The falls are located roadside, 4.7 miles (7.6 km) upstream from the confluence of the Gibbon and Firehole Rivers at Madison Junction on the Grand Loop Road.

== History ==
The falls were first described by William Henry Jackson during the second Hayden geological survey of 1872. There is no historical record as to how they got their name, but by the mid-1880s, they were routinely referred to as Gibbon Falls in both government and commercial accounts of the park.

In 1883, in his The Yellowstone National Park-A Manual for Tourists, Henry J. Winser described the falls:

Falls of the Gibbon-These are situated four miles from the entrance to the canón, and are reached by a trail on the right of the road. The descent is quite steep, but the stalwart tourist wlll not regret the strain upon his muscles after a sight of the magnificent falls. The water tumbles over them in a foamy sheet, full eighty feet in depth, making a charming picture, full of life and vigor, which is in striking contrast to its setting or grim rocks and dusky pines. After leaving the falls and the foaming river, the road soon crosses Canón Creek, passing for the next eight miles over a succession of pine and fir clad terraces, the charms of which are apt to cloy, before the next attractive point is reached.

— Henry J. Winser, 1883.

In 1895, Hiram M. Chittenden described Gibbon Falls in his Yellowstone National Park-Historical and Descriptive. In 1895, the road was on the opposite side of the river from where it runs today.

Gibbon Falls (8.5 miles) [the distance from Norris] is a waterfall of very irregular outline, but withal one of much beauty. The road hangs on the side of the cliff far above it, and affords a lovely view of the forest-covered valley below.

— Hiram M. Chittenden, 1918

== Barrier to fish migration ==
When the Washburn and Hayden parties traveled through the Firehole River and Gibbon River basins in the 1870s, the Gibbon River above Gibbon Falls was barren of fish, the falls being a natural barrier to upstream migration. Unlike the Yellowstone drainage, the upper Gibbon was isolated from any connection to drainages on the Pacific slope. The absence of fish was overcome in 1890 when the first Rainbow trout were introduced into the river above the falls. In 1920, Arctic Grayling, native in the Gibbon and Madison Rivers below the falls were stocked in Grebe Lake at the headwaters of the Gibbon. Today, the falls still block upstream migrations of spawning trout from the Madison River, but the upper Gibbon has become a consistent trout fishery because of these introductions.

Images of Gibbon Falls
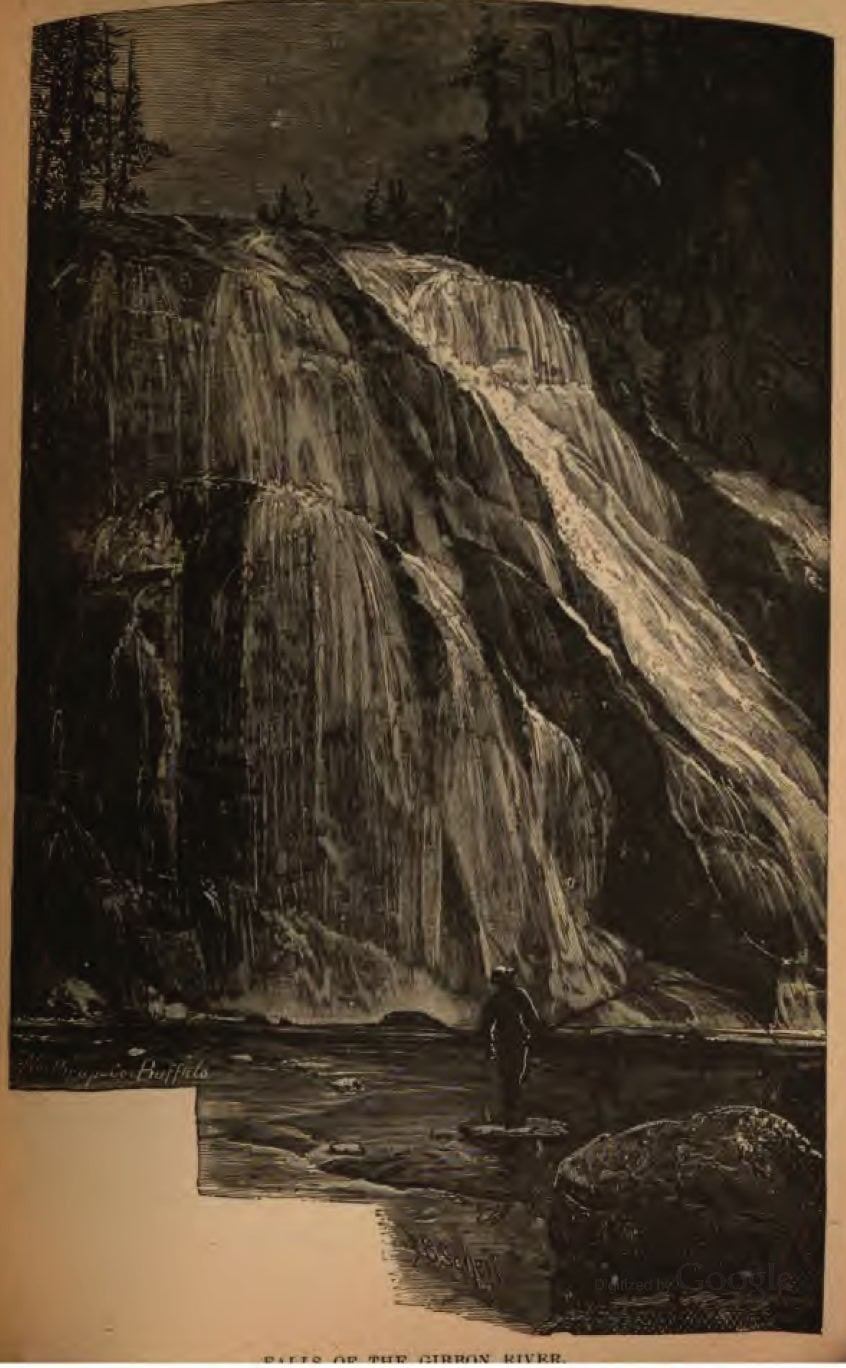
Falls of the Gibbon, 1883.

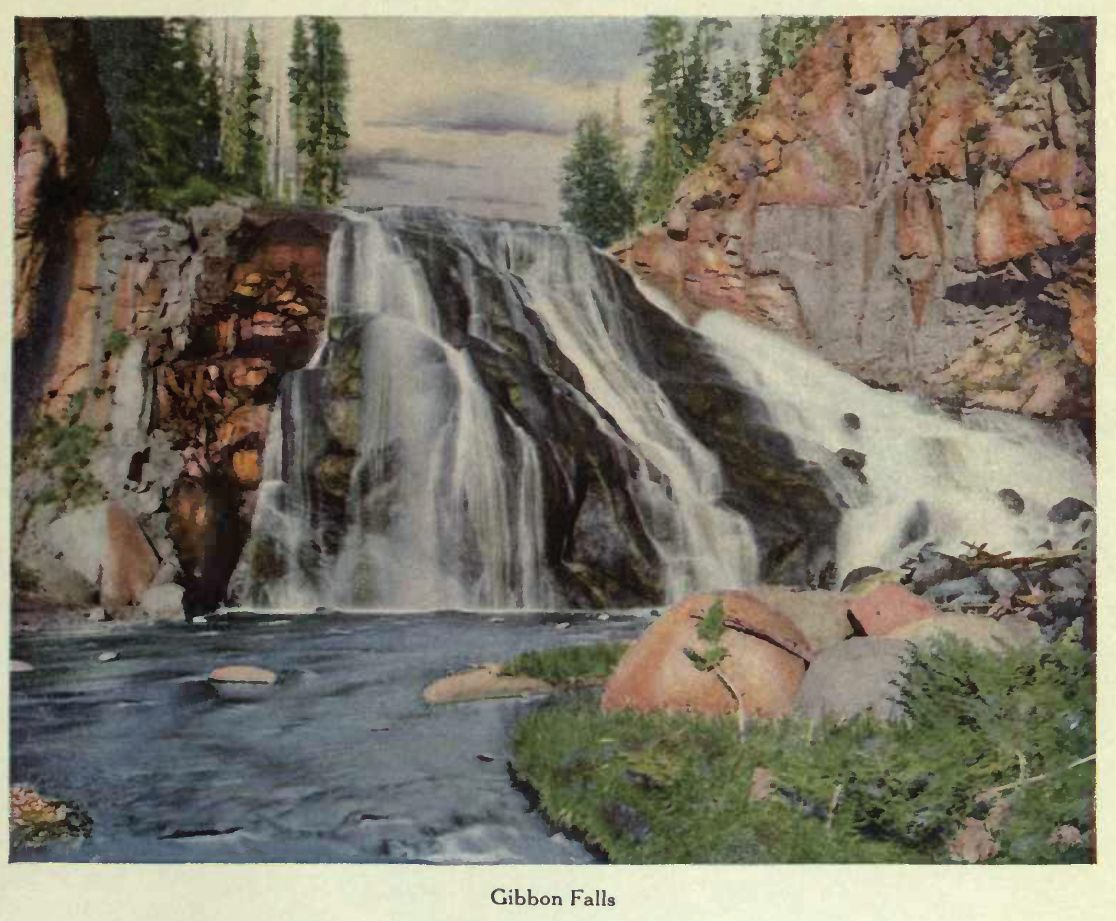
Color litho, Frank Jay Haynes, 1910

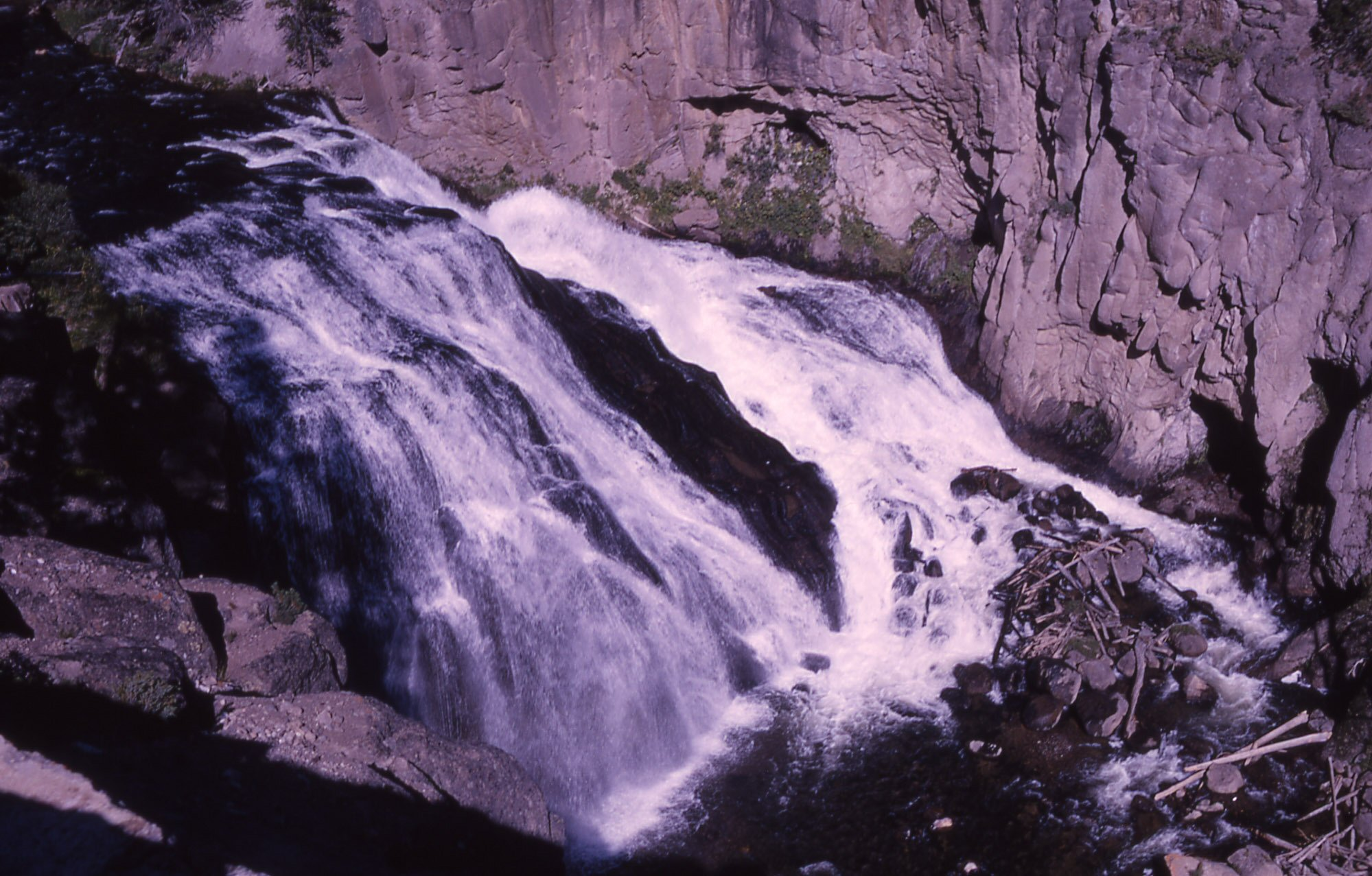
Gibbon Falls, 1965

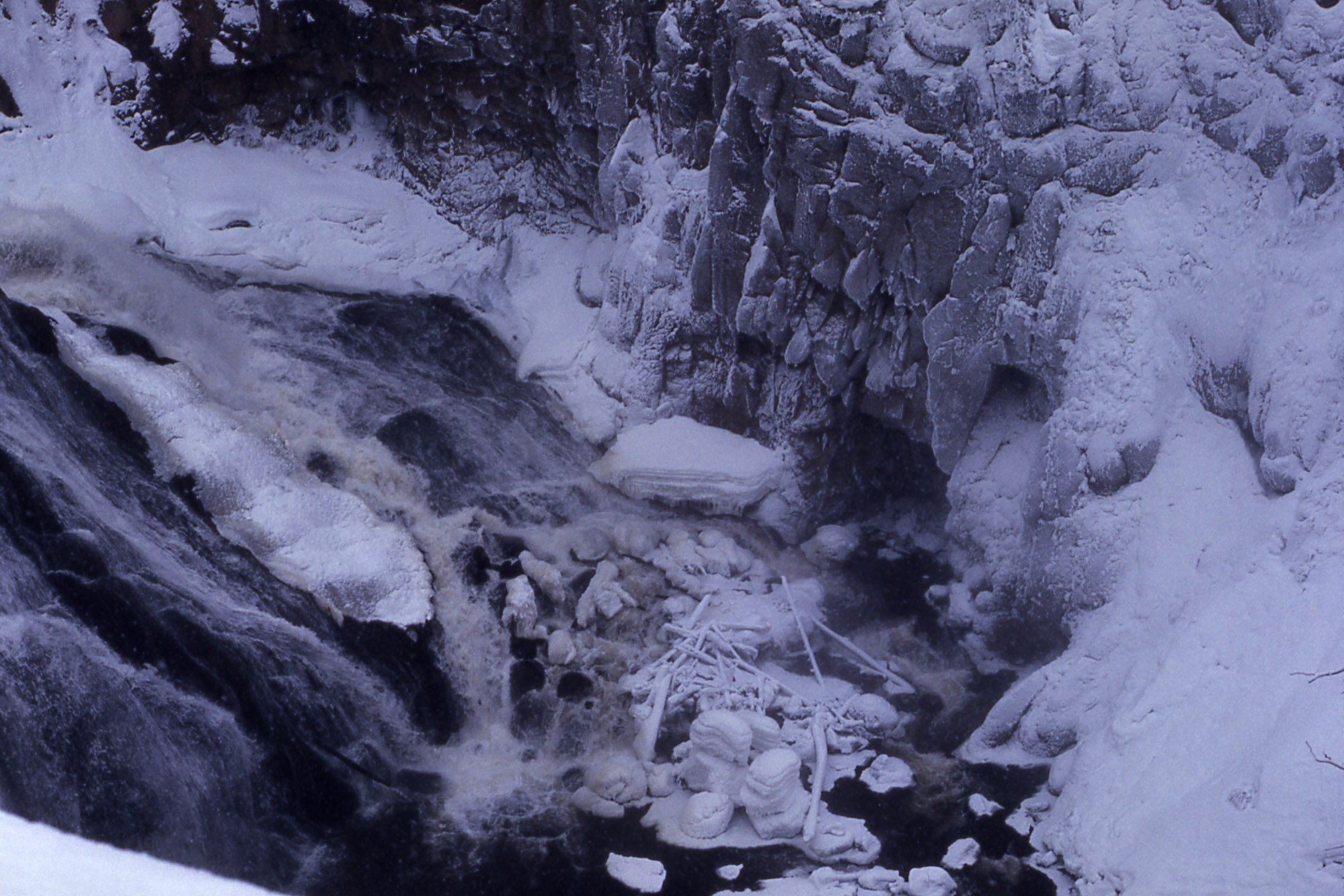
Winter, 1969

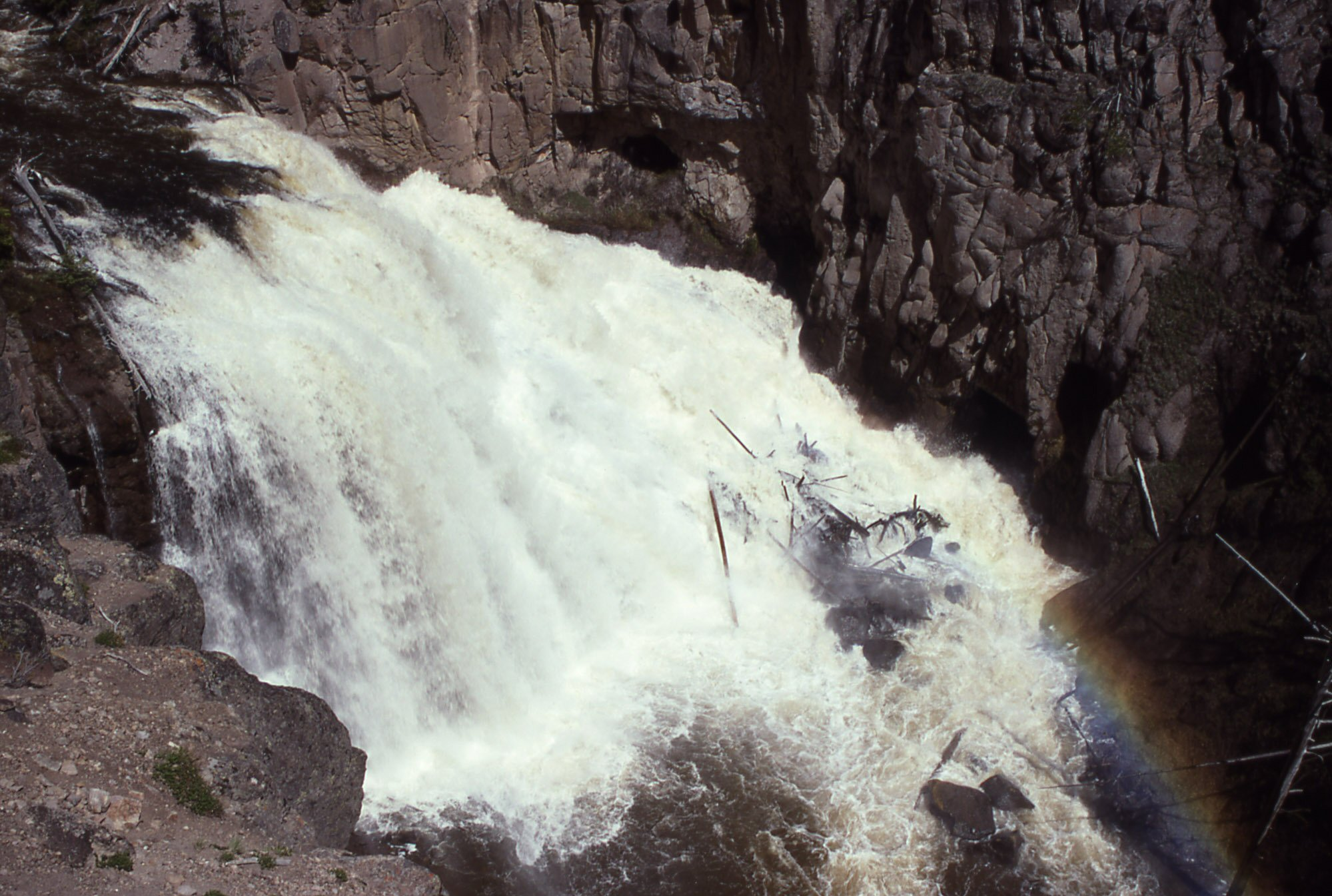
Spring runoff, 1993

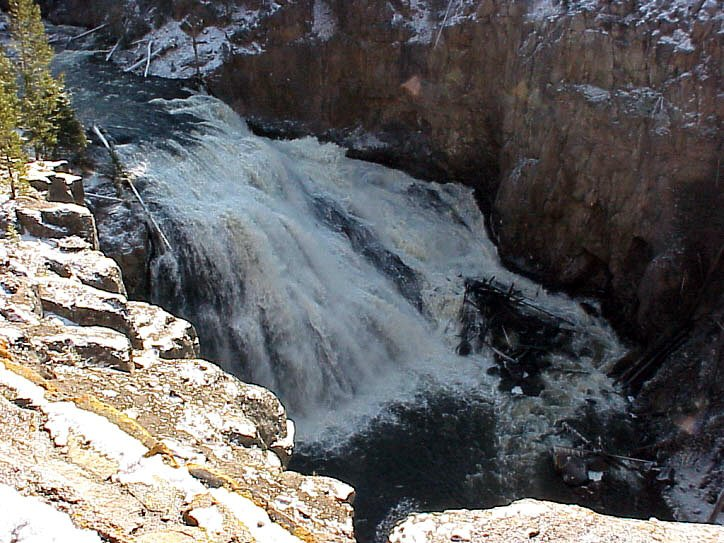
May, 2003

Gibbon Falls, Yellowstone N.P., September, 2026

== See also ==
- List of waterfalls
- Waterfalls in Yellowstone National Park
