= List of amphibians of Yellowstone National Park =

This is a list of amphibians of Yellowstone National Park in the United States.

== Blotched Tiger Salamander ==
The Blotched tiger salamander (Ambystoma tigrinum melanostictum) is a species of Mole salamander. Tiger salamanders are large, with a typical length of 6–8 in (150–200 mm). They can reach up to 14 in (36 cm) in length, particularly neotenic individuals. Adults are usually blotchy with grey, green, or black, and have large, lidded eyes. They have short snouts, thick necks, sturdy legs, and long tails. Their diet consists largely of small insects and worms, though it is not rare for an adult to consume small frogs and baby mice.

In Yellowstone, the only salamander in the park is widespread in a great variety of habitats, with sizable populations in Lamar Valley. Adults range up to about 9 inches, including the tail. It breeds in ponds and fishless lakes.

== Boreal Chorus Frog ==
The Boreal chorus frog, (Pseudacris maculata) is a species of chorus frog native to Canada from the west of Lake Superior to western Alberta and north to the North West Territories. It occurs in the United States throughout Montana, northwestern Wisconsin, northeastern Arizona, northern New Mexico and southwestern Utah. This is a small species of frog, reaching about 30mm in length. It is highly variable however it is normally brown, but can be green on the dorsal surface, with 3 broken dorsal stripes, these stripes can be very distinct to quite faint. There is a dark band present from the snout, through the eye and continuing down the side. It has slightly enlarged toes discs to help in climbing small grasses and vegetation.

In Yellowstone, this frog is common, but seldom seen due to its small size and secretive habits. It lives in moist meadows and forests near wetlands and lays eggs in loose, irregular clusters attached to submerged vegetation in quiet water.

== Western Toad ==
The Western toad or boreal toad (Bufo boreas) is a large toad species, between 5.6 and 13 cm long, of western North America. It has a white or cream dorsal stripe, and is dusky gray or greenish dorsally with skin glands concentrated within the dark blotches. This is Yellowstone's only toad species.

Once common throughout the park, they now appear to be much rarer than spotted frogs and chorus frogs; scientists fear this species has experienced a decline in the Greater Yellowstone Ecosystem. Adults can range far from wetlands because of their ability to soak up water from tiny puddles or moist areas. They lay eggs in shallow, sun-warmed water, such as ponds, lake edges, slow streams, and river backwaters.

== Columbia Spotted Frog ==
The Columbia spotted frog (Rana luteiventris) is a North American species of frog. It is a medium-sized frog reaching lengths of up to three and a half inches (8.9 cm). Its color ranges from a dark, olive green to light brown with irregularly-shaped black spots on its back and legs (rendering its name). The belly and upper lip are white in color. Individuals can be distinguished from other Rana species by their shorter back legs, narrow snout and upturned eyes. Since they spend most of their time in the water, they also have more webbing in their hind feet than similar species.

In Yellowstone this frog is abundant and the best known amphibian in the park. It is found all summer along or in rivers, streams, smaller lakes, marshes, ponds, and rain pools. It lays eggs in stagnant or quiet water, in globular masses surrounded by jelly.

Amphibians of Yellowstone National Park
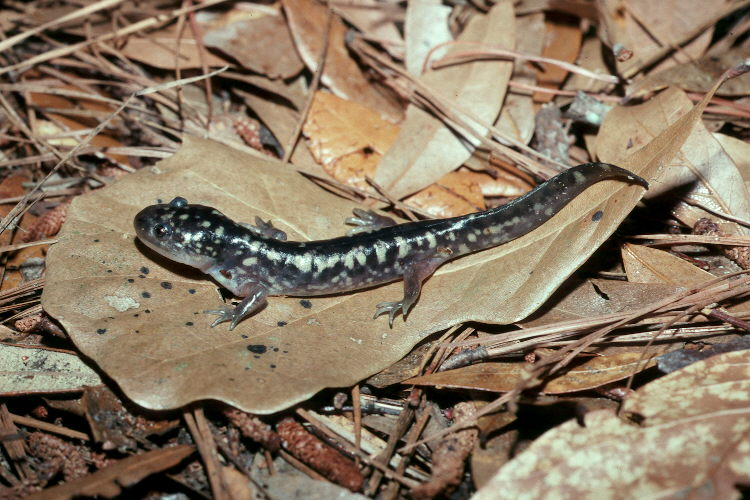
Tiger salamander

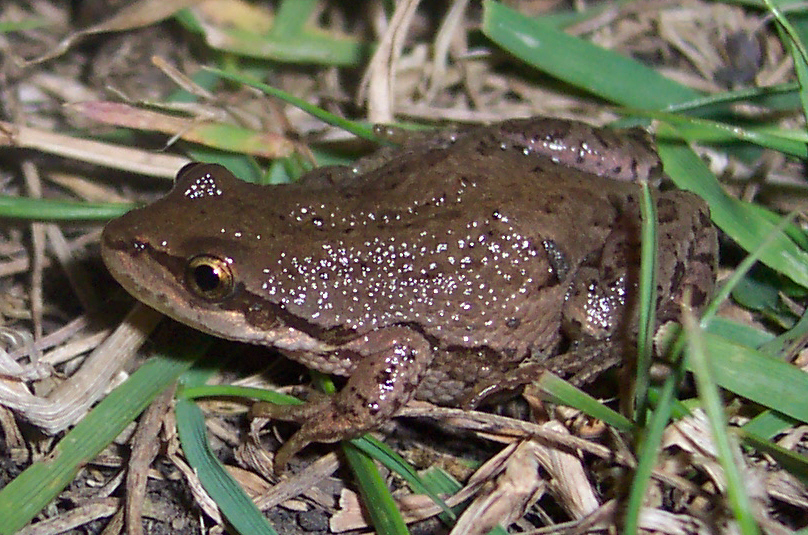
Boreal chorus frog

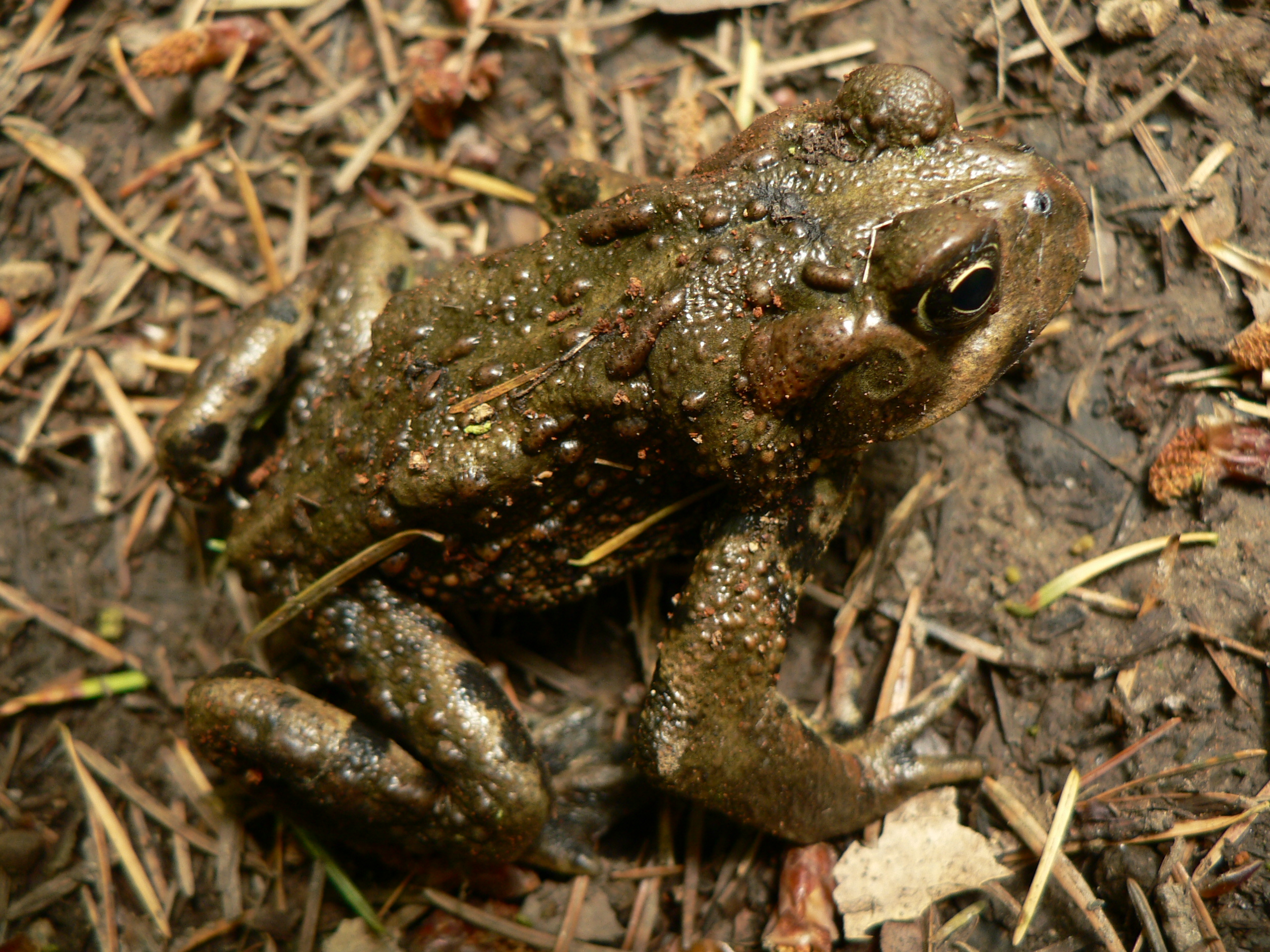
Boreal toad

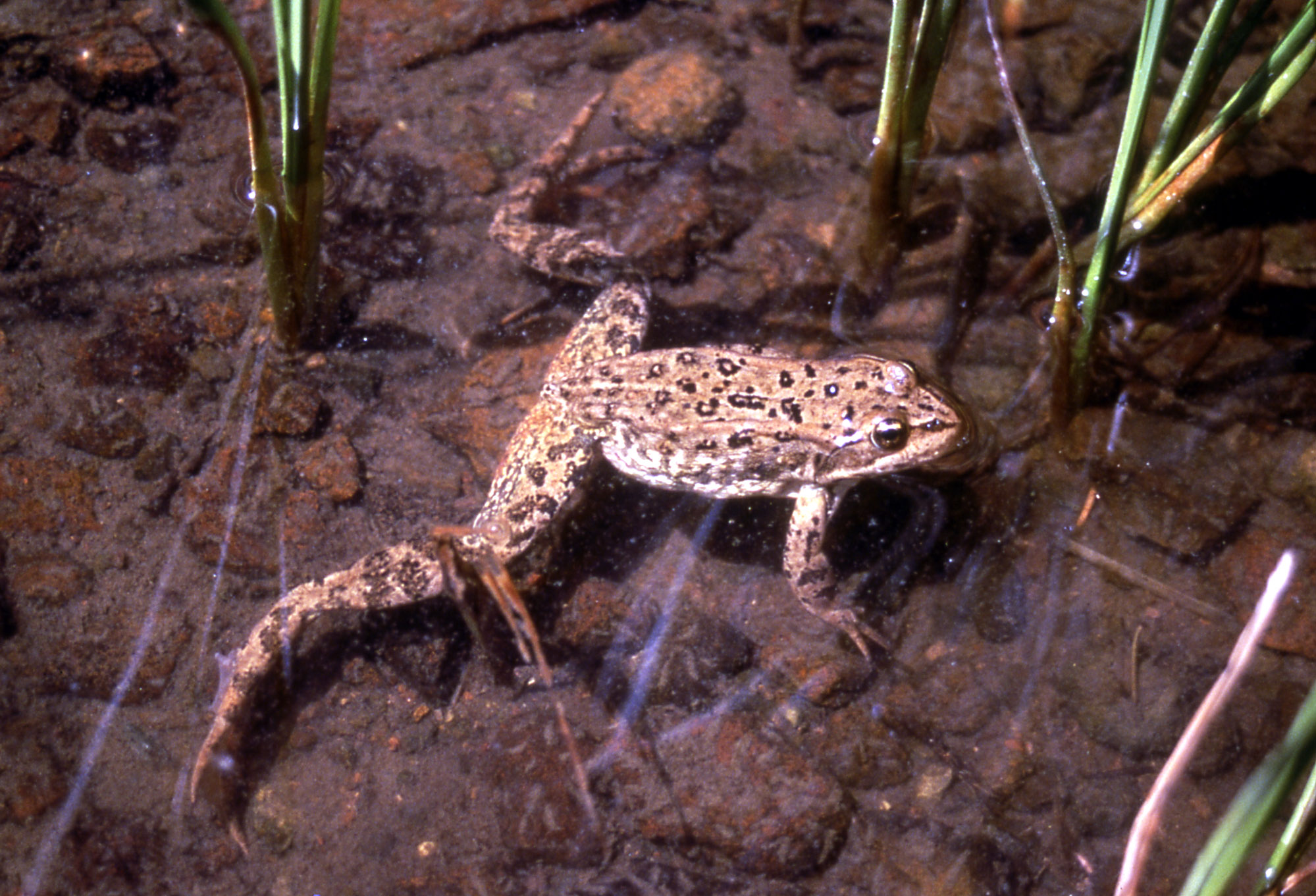
Columbia spotted frog

== See also ==
- List of birds of Yellowstone National Park
- List of reptiles of Yellowstone National Park
- List of animals of Yellowstone
