= List of reptiles of Yellowstone National Park =

This is a list of reptiles of Yellowstone National Park in the United States.

== Painted Turtle ==
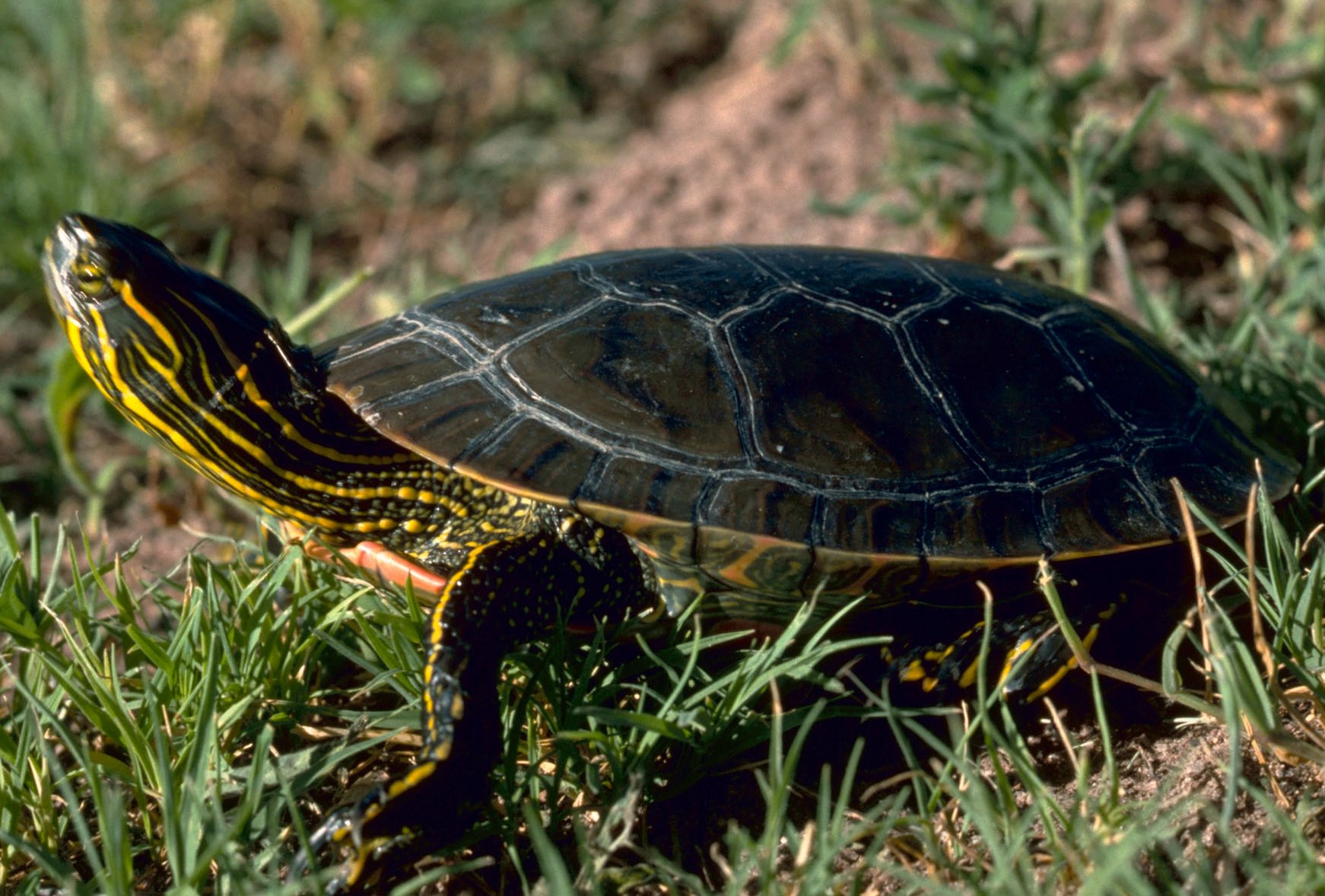

Painted turtles can be found in rivers and lakes along the northern edge of the park.

== Bullsnake ==
The bullsnake (Pituophis catenifer sayi) is a large non-venomous colubrid snake, widespread in the part of the United States, northern Mexico, and southern Canada. It is a subspecies of the gopher snake (Pituophis catenifer). The epithet sayi is in honor of zoologist Thomas Say.

In Yellowstone, it is the park's largest reptile ranging from 50 to 72 inches long. It is found at lower elevations, drier, warmer climates, and open areas such as near Mammoth Hot Springs. The bullsnake lives in burrows and eats small rodents. It is often mistaken for a rattlesnake because of its appearance and its defensive behavior; when disturbed it will coil up, hiss loudly, and vibrate its tail against the ground, producing a rattling sound.

== Prairie rattlesnake ==
The prairie rattlesnake (Crotalus viridis viridis) is a venomous pitviper species native to the western United States, southwestern Canada, and northern Mexico.

In Yellowstone, this is the only dangerously venomous snake in the park. It lives in the lower Yellowstone River areas of the park, including Reese Creek, Stephens Creek, and Rattlesnake Butte, where the habitat is drier and warmer than elsewhere in the park. Its behavior is usually defensive rather than aggressive. There have been only two rattlesnake bites reported during the history of the park.

== Rubber boa ==
The rubber boa (Charina bottae) is a snake in the family Boidae and genus Charina. The Boidae consists of the nonvenomous snakes commonly called boas and consists of 43 species. The genus Charina consists of four species, three of which are found in North America, and one species found in Africa.

In Yellowstone this snake is infrequently encountered in due to its nocturnal and burrowing habits. It eats rodents and may spend a great deal of time partially buried under leaves and soil, and in rodent burrows. It is usually found in rocky areas near streams or rivers, with shrubs or trees nearby. The most recent occurrences in the park have been in the Bechler region and Gibbon Meadows.

== Sagebrush lizard ==
The sagebrush lizard (Sceloporus graciosus graciosus) is a common lizard found in mid to high latitudes in the Western United States of America. It belongs to the genus Sceloporus (spiny lizards) in the Phrynosomatidae family of reptiles. Named after the sagebrush plants near which it is commonly found, the sagebrush lizard has keeled and spiny scales running along its dorsal surface.

In Yellowstone, this is the only lizard found in the park. It is usually found below 6,000 feet elevation, but in Yellowstone it can live up to 8,300 feet. Populations living in thermally influenced areas are possibly isolated from others. It is most common along the lower portions of the Yellowstone River near Gardiner, Montana and upstream to the mouth of Bear Creek. It also occurs in Norris Geyser Basin, Shoshone and Heart Lake geyser basins, and other hydrothermal areas.

== Valley garter snake ==
The valley garter snake (Thamnophis sirtalis fitchi) is a subspecies of the common garter snake. It is a snake indigenous to North America. Most garter snakes have a pattern of yellow stripes on a brown background and their average length is about 1 metre (3.3 ft) to 1.5 metres (4.9 ft). The common garter snake is a diurnal snake. In summer, it is most active in the morning and late afternoon; in cooler seasons or climates, it restricts its activity to the warm afternoons.

In Yellowstone, it was once thought to be common, but is now in decline for no apparent reason. In Yellowstone, it is only observed in the Fall River drainage in the Bechler region.

== Wandering garter snake ==
The wandering garter snake (Thamnophis elegans vagrans) is a subspecies of the western terrestrial garter snake, a species of colubrid snake residing only in Southwestern Canada, and Western United States. Seven subspecies are currently recognized. Most snakes have a yellow, light orange, or white dorsal stripe, accompanied by two stripes on its side of the same color. Some varieties have red or black spots between the dorsal stripe and the side stripes. This snake often inhabits coniferous forests, and is relatively aquatic.

In Yellowstone, this is the most common reptile in the park. It is usually found near water in all areas of the park. It eats small rodents, fish, frogs, tadpoles, salamanders, earthworms, slugs, snails, and leeches.

Reptiles of Yellowstone National Park

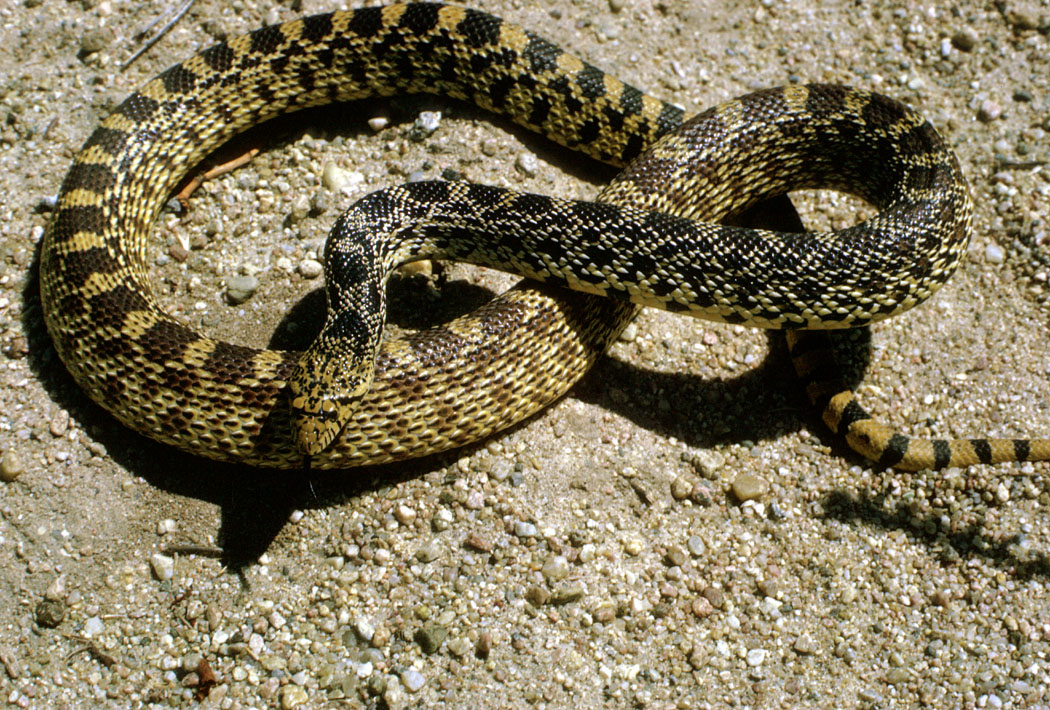
Bullsnake

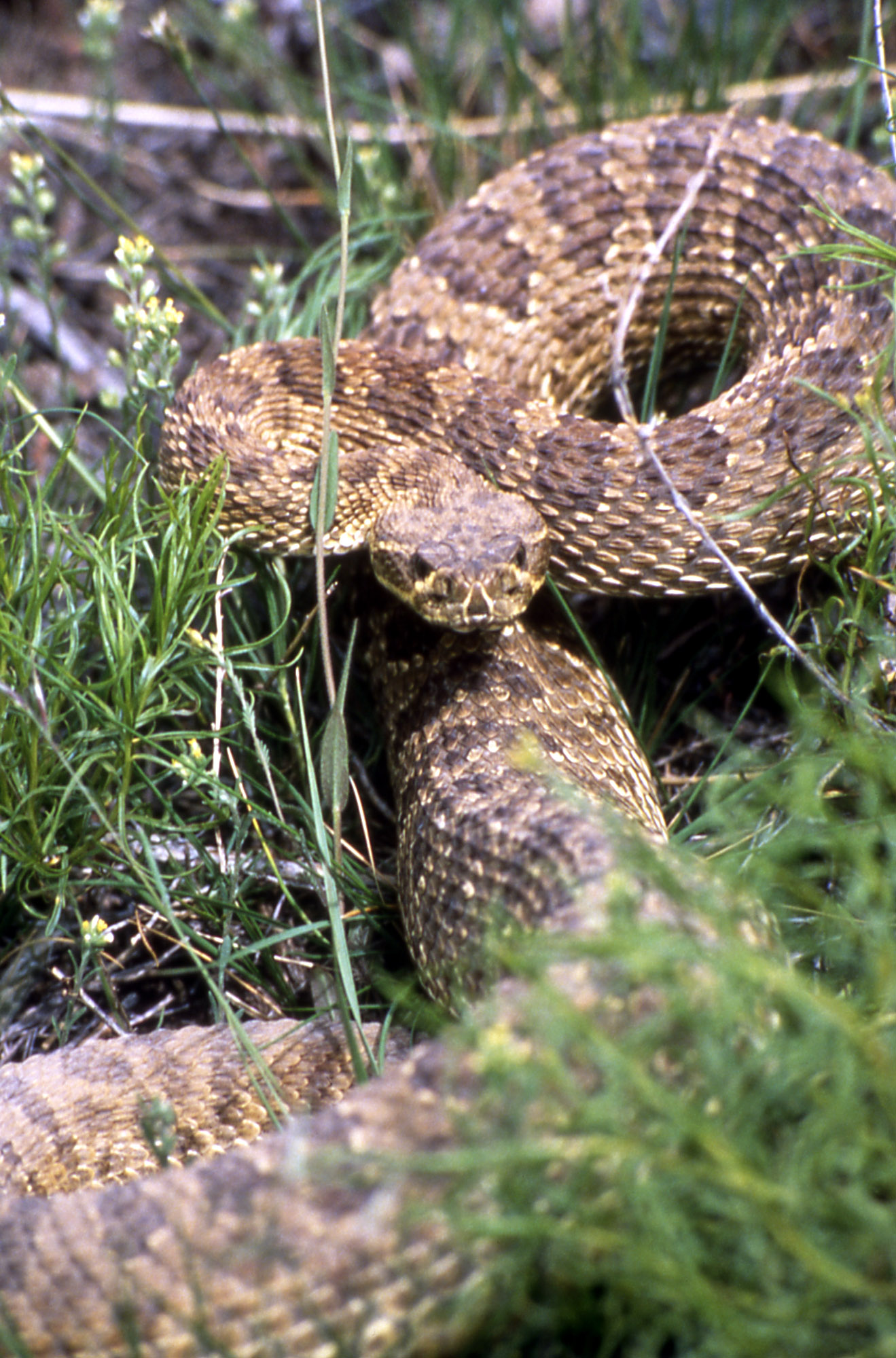
Prairie Rattlesnake

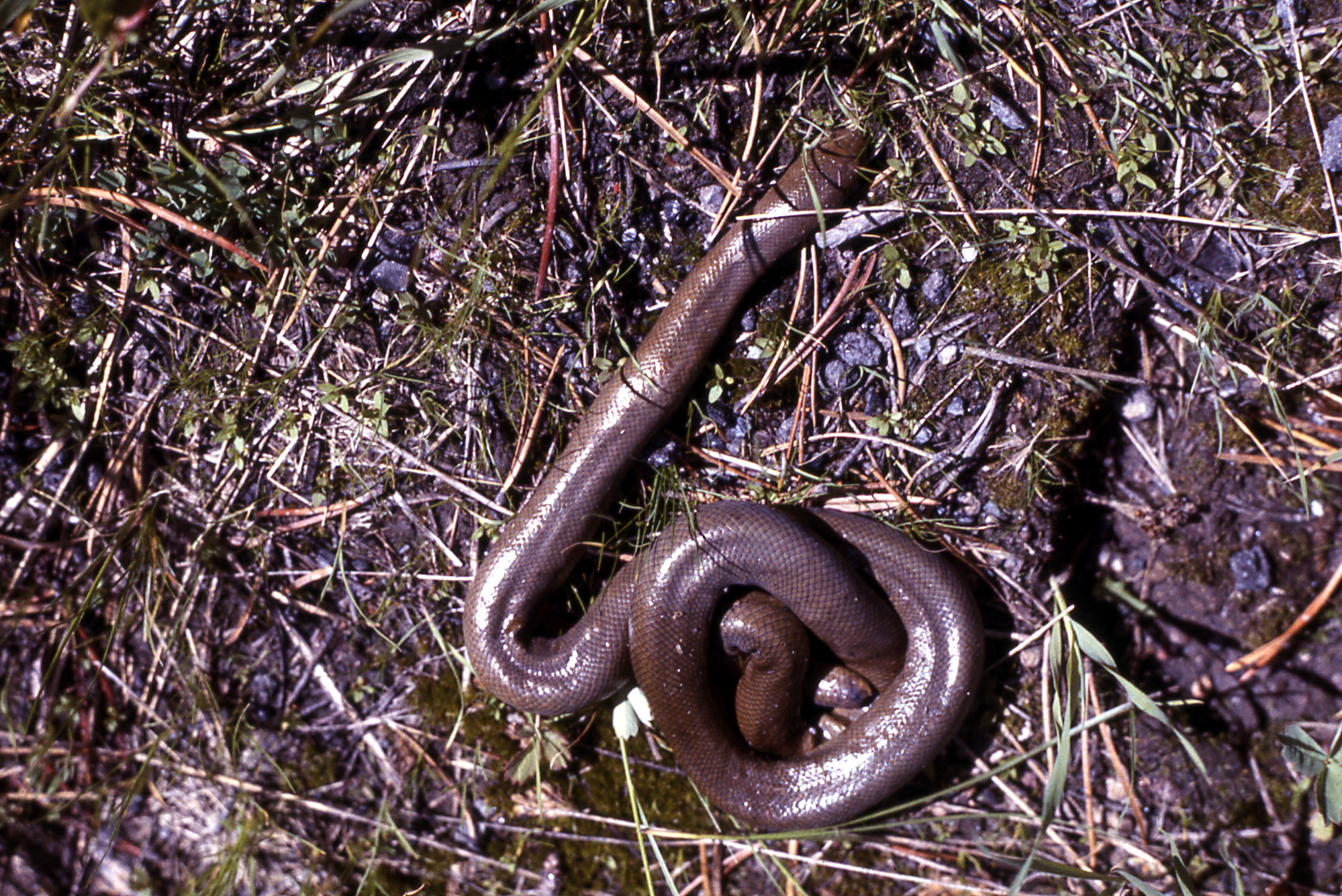
Rubber Boa

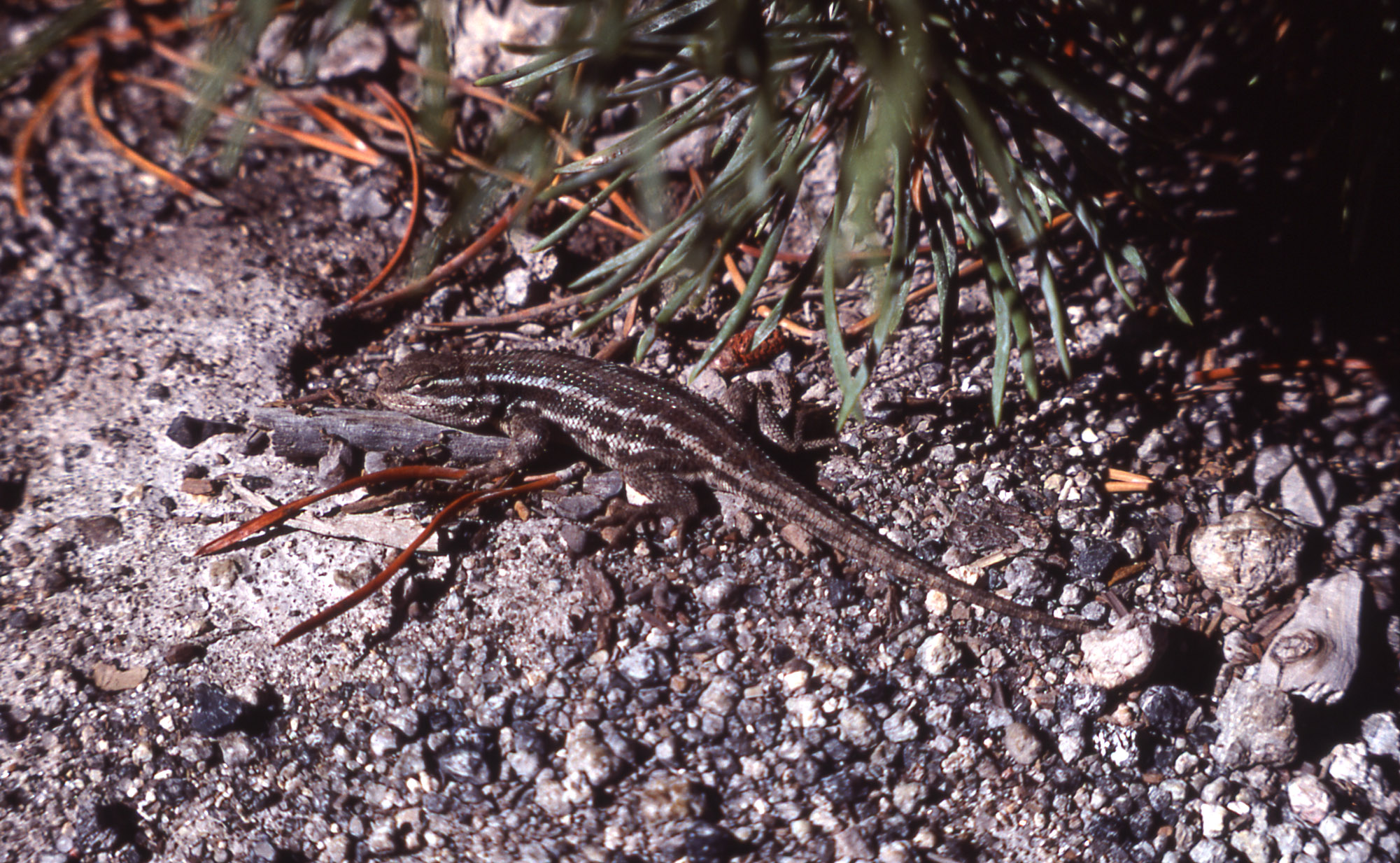
Sagebrush Lizard

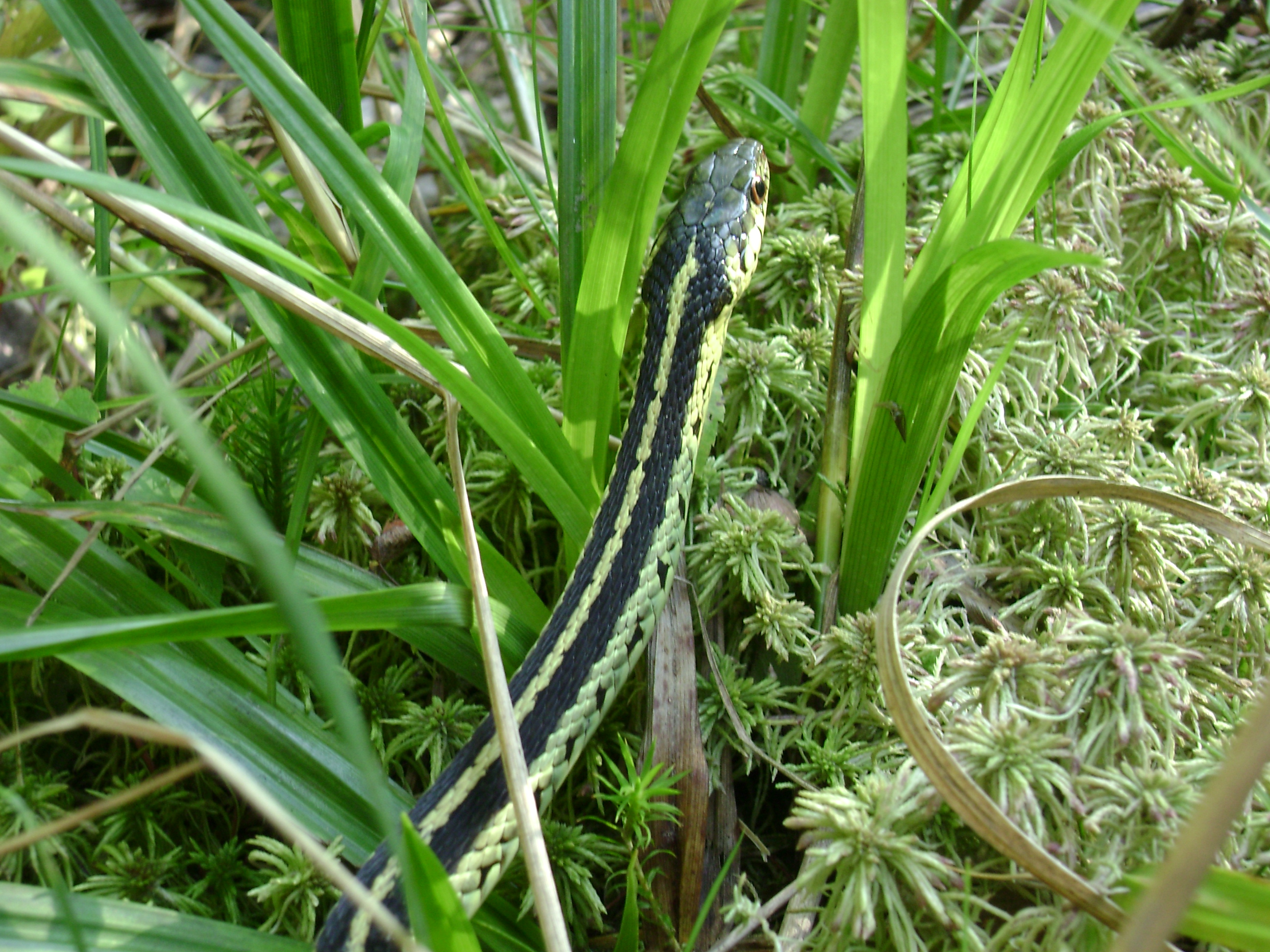
Valley Garter Snake

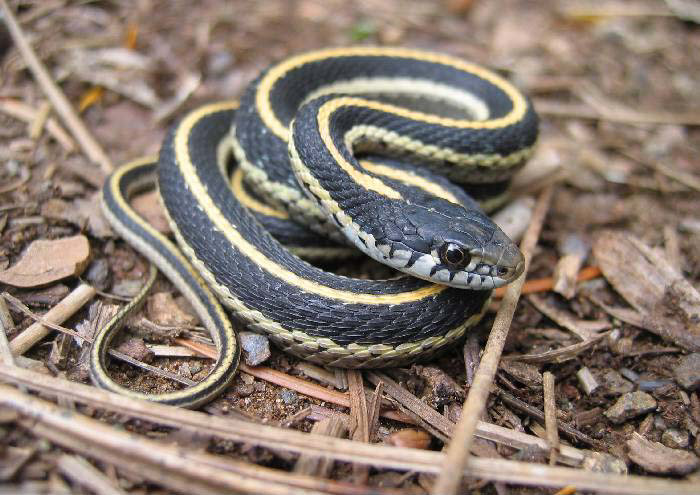
Wandering Garter Snake

== See also ==
- Amphibians and reptiles of Yellowstone National Park
- Animals of Yellowstone
