= Amphibians and reptiles of Yellowstone National Park =

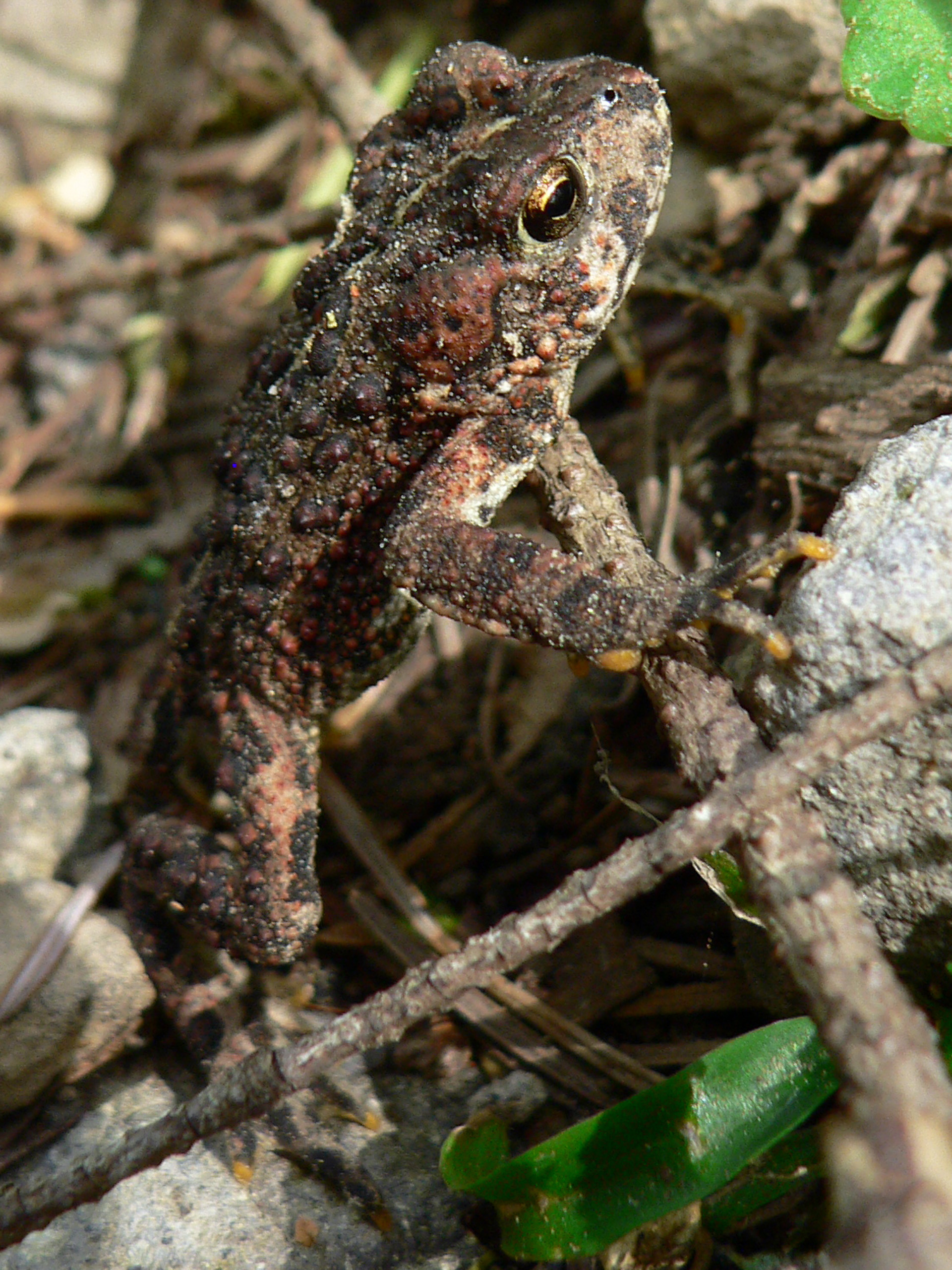
Boreal Toad

Yellowstone National Park is home to four amphibian species and seven species of reptiles. None of the species are endangered or threatened. The glacial nature of and dry conditions in Yellowstone are likely responsible for the relatively low number of amphibian and reptile species in Yellowstone,.

== See also ==
- Animals of Yellowstone
