= List of animals of Yellowstone =

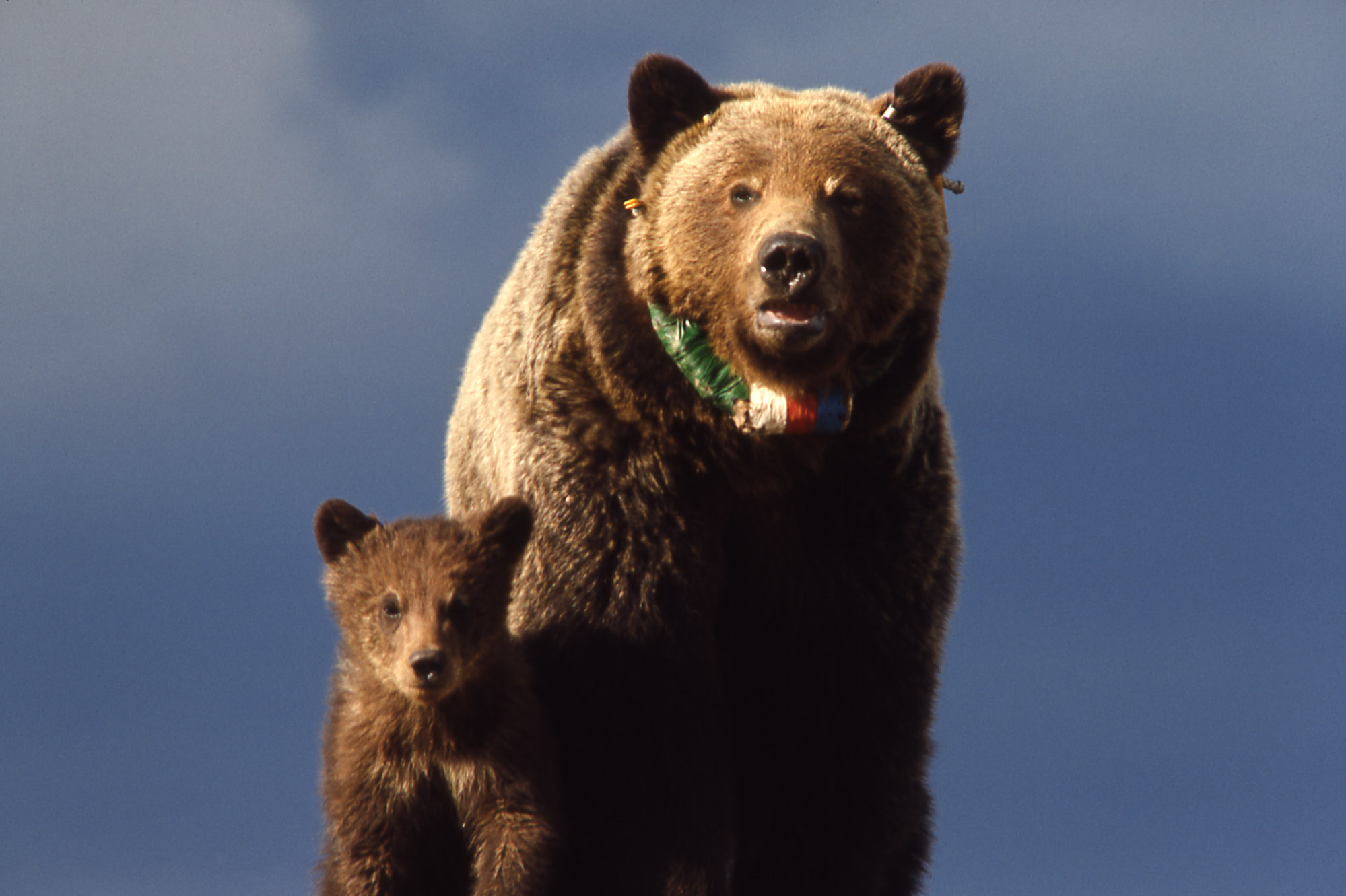
Grizzly bear sow with radio neckband and her cub

Yellowstone National Park in the northwest United States is home to a large variety of mammals, birds, fish, reptiles and amphibians, many of which migrate within the Greater Yellowstone Ecosystem. These animals are a major park attraction.

== Large mammals ==
=== American bison ===
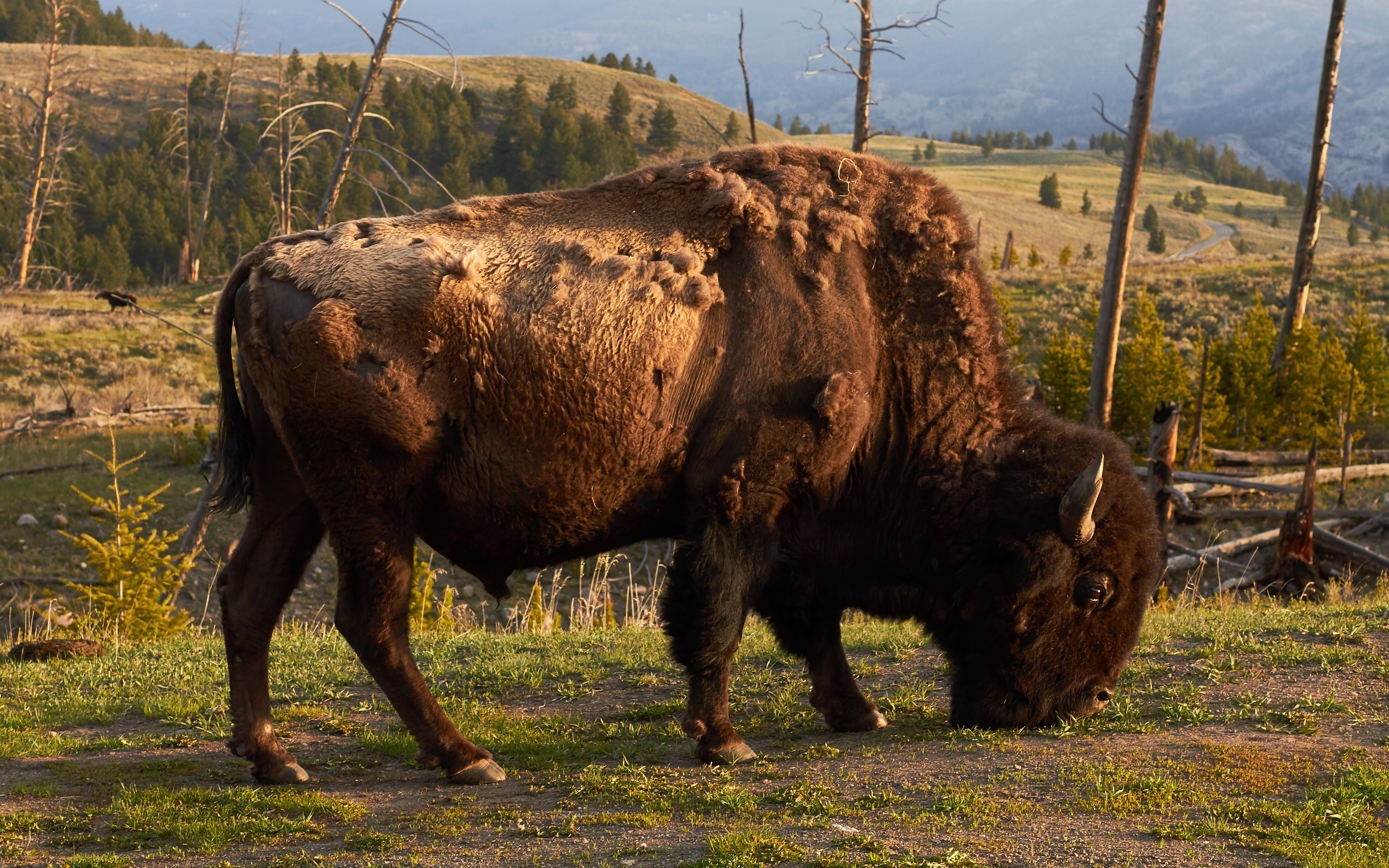
American bison in Yellowstone National Park

Bison are the largest grazing mammals in Yellowstone National Park. They are obligate herbivores, a grazer of grasslands and sedges in the meadows, the foothills, and even the high-elevation, forested plateaus of Yellowstone. Bison males, called bulls, can weigh upwards of 1,800 pounds. Females (cows) average about 1,300 pounds. Both stand approximately six feet tall at the shoulder, and can move with surprising speed to defend their young or when approached too closely by people. Bison breed from mid-July to mid-August, and bear one calf in April and May. Some wolf predation of bison is documented in Canada and has recently been observed in Yellowstone. Bison live an average lifespan of 20–25 years in the wild.

Yellowstone is the only place in the lower 48 states where a population of wild American bison has persisted since prehistoric times, although fewer than 50 native bison remained there in 1902. Fearing extinction, the park imported 21 bison from two privately owned herds, as foundation stock for a bison ranching project that spanned 50 years at the Lamar Buffalo Ranch in Yellowstone's Lamar Valley. Activities there included irrigation, hay-feeding, roundups, culling, and predator control, to artificially ensure herd survival. By the 1920s, some intermingling of the introduced and wild bison had begun. With protection from poaching, the native and transplanted populations increased. In 1936, bison were transplanted to historic habitats in the Firehole River and Hayden Valley. In 2003, the entire population numbered 1,477. Bison were trapped and herds periodically reduced until 1967, when only 397 bison were counted parkwide. All bison herd reduction activities were phased out after 1966, again allowing natural ecological processes to determine bison numbers and distribution. Presently, the park's bison population is estimated at 4,000.

Bison are nomadic grazers, wandering high on Yellowstone's grassy plateaus in summer. Despite their slow gait, bison are surprisingly fast for animals that weigh more than half a ton. In winter, they use their large heads like a plow to push aside snow and find winter food. In the park interior where snows are deep, they winter in thermally influenced areas and around the geyser basins. Bison also move to winter range in the northern part of Yellowstone.

=== Bears ===
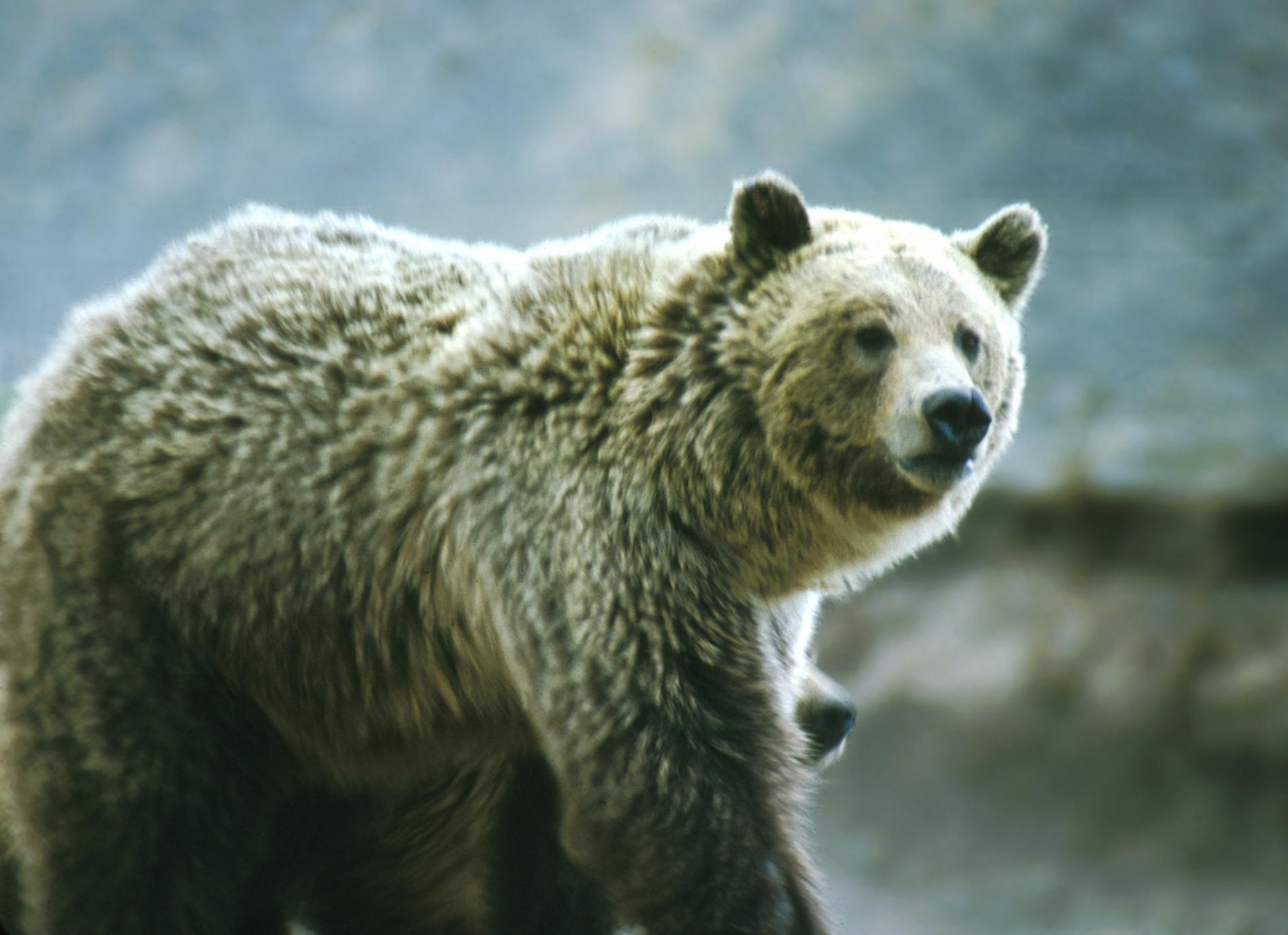
Grizzly bear

As of 2017, the grizzly bear (Ursus arctos horribilis) population within the Greater Yellowstone Ecosystem (Yellowstone and surrounding areas) was estimated at 718, with a minimum of 640 and a maximum of 796. The black bear (Ursus americanus) population within the same ecosystem was estimated at 575, with a minimum of 500 and a maximum of 650.

While in spawning streams, Yellowstone cutthroat trout are preyed upon by numerous predators including black bears and grizzly bears. Due to their high digestibility, and protein and lipid content, spawning cutthroat trout are one of the highest sources of net digestible energy for grizzly bears in the Yellowstone ecosystem. Cutthroat trout are an important late-spring and early-summer food source for bears, providing them the opportunity to regain body mass after den emergence, and assisting females with cubs meet the energetic demands of lactation. The average lifespan of a grizzly bear is about 22 years, and the average lifespan of a black bear is about 17 years.

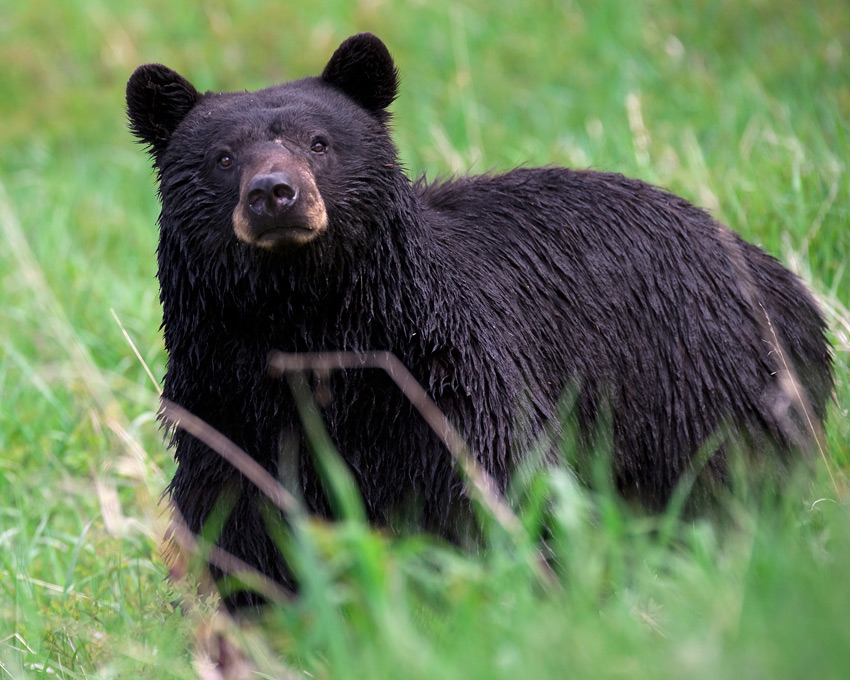
Black bear

With the reintroduction of gray wolves (Canis lupus) to Yellowstone National Park, much interest has been shown regarding the effects of a restored wolf population on both grizzly bears and black bears. Grizzly bears, black bears, and gray wolves have historically coexisted in much of the same range throughout a large portion of North America.

Bears were once commonly observed along roadsides and within developed areas of Yellowstone National Park. Bears were attracted to these areas by the availability of human foods in the form of handouts and unsecured camp groceries and garbage. Although having bears readily visible along roadsides and within developed areas was very popular with park visitors, an average of 48 bear-caused human injuries occurred each year from 1930 through 1969. Rocky Mountain grizzly bears have killed several people in the park since the 1970s.

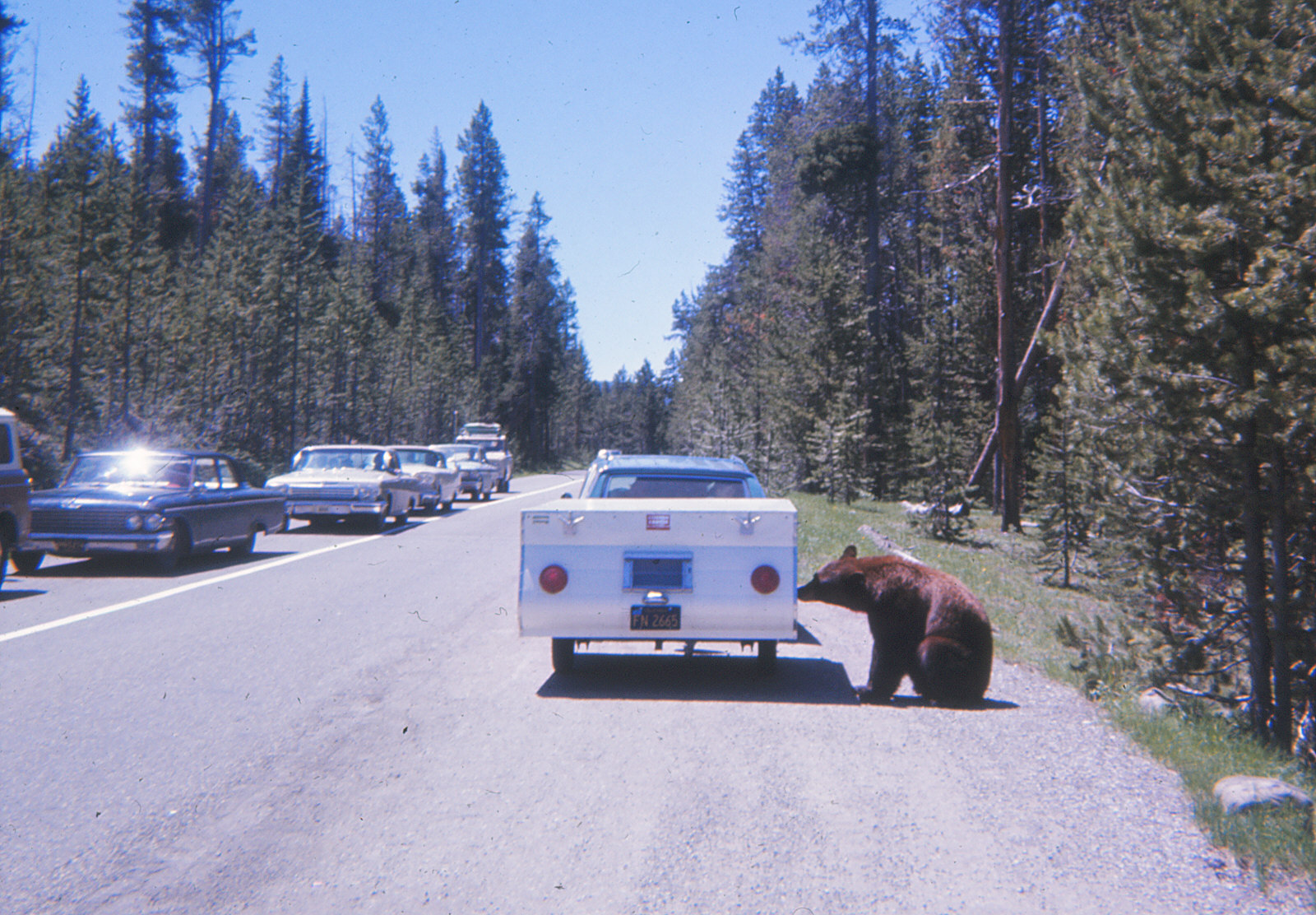
Black bear searching for food in a camper (1967)

Park authorities initiated an intensive bear management program in 1970. The objectives were restoring the grizzly bear and black bear populations to subsistence on natural forage, and reducing bear-caused injuries to humans. As part of the bear management program, regulations prohibiting the feeding of bears were strictly enforced. As the bears became more desperate for food and more aggressive, more of them were encountered in camping areas. Over a hundred grizzly bears had to be euthanized in the next several years, putting the park's bear population on the brink of extinction. On July 28, 1975, under the authority of the Endangered Species Act, the United States Fish and Wildlife Service listed the grizzly bear as a threatened species in the lower 48 states.

Over the next several decades, the bears learned to hunt and forage for themselves from non-human food sources, and their population slowly grew. On March 22, 2007, the grizzly bear was taken off the endangered species list. In the years since it was listed as a threatened species, the Yellowstone grizzly bear population has increased to at least 640 by 2017.

From 1980 to 2002, over 62 million people visited Yellowstone National Park. During the same period, 32 people were injured by bears. Grizzly bear-inflicted injuries to humans in developed areas averaged approximately one per year during the 1930s through the 1950s, and four per year during the 1960s. Human injuries from black bears have decreased from averages of 46 per year from 1931 to 1969, to four per year during the 1970s, and less than one per year from 1980 to 2002. The chance of being injured by a bear while in the park is approximately one in 1.9 million. Eight known bear-caused human fatalities have occurred within the park since 1872, including two in 2011 and one in 2015. Seven of the eight bears were grizzlies, while the other was undetermined.

=== Bobcats ===
In the early years of the 20th century, bobcats (Lynx rufus) were reported as "somewhat common" in the park. There have been 9 to 14 reported sightings each decade since 1960. These sightings have occurred throughout the park; about 80 percent have occurred in the northern half. Bobcats have been reported in about equal numbers during all seasons. In 1960, a bobcat was killed by a car near Squaw Lake (now Indian Pond) on the north shore of Yellowstone Lake; its skull was deposited in the Yellowstone Museum collection. Other roadkilled bobcats were reported in 1993 and 1996. In 1960, a young bobcat was reported on the porch of the administration building at Mammoth; other young bobcats have been reported at Pebble Creek bridge (February 1977) and at Canyon campground (July 1986), where one accompanied an adult bobcat.

No research has been conducted in Yellowstone to determine the numbers or distribution of this elusive animal that usually is solitary, nocturnal, and widely scattered over its range.

Unlike Canadian lynx, which they resemble, bobcats elsewhere have been highly adaptable to human-caused changes in environmental conditions; some biologists believe that there are more bobcats in the United States today than in colonial times. Yellowstone has many rock outcrops, canyons bordered by rock ledges, conifer forests, and semi-open areas that seem to offer conditions favorable for bobcats—adequate shelter, a variety of rodents, rabbits, hares, birds, and other small animals as well as seasonal carrion, for food. Carrion is seldom used if live prey is available. Studies elsewhere have shown that bobcats also may kill both young and adult antelope and deer; they stalk bedded adults and may be carried long distances while biting their prey in the neck. Bobcats live an average lifespan of about 7 years.

Visitors are advised to report any sightings of bobcats or bobcat tracks to a ranger or visitor center. For animals so seldom recorded, every observation is considered useful and important.

=== Canada lynx ===
The Canada lynx is listed as a threatened species under the Endangered Species Act. Biologists studying the lynx in Yellowstone believe it has persisted in the park in some number since the park's creation in 1872. A four-year study completed in 2005 concluded there is a small resident population of lynx in the park, but it is rarely seen directly or indirectly (tracks) by either biologists or visitors.

=== Coyotes ===
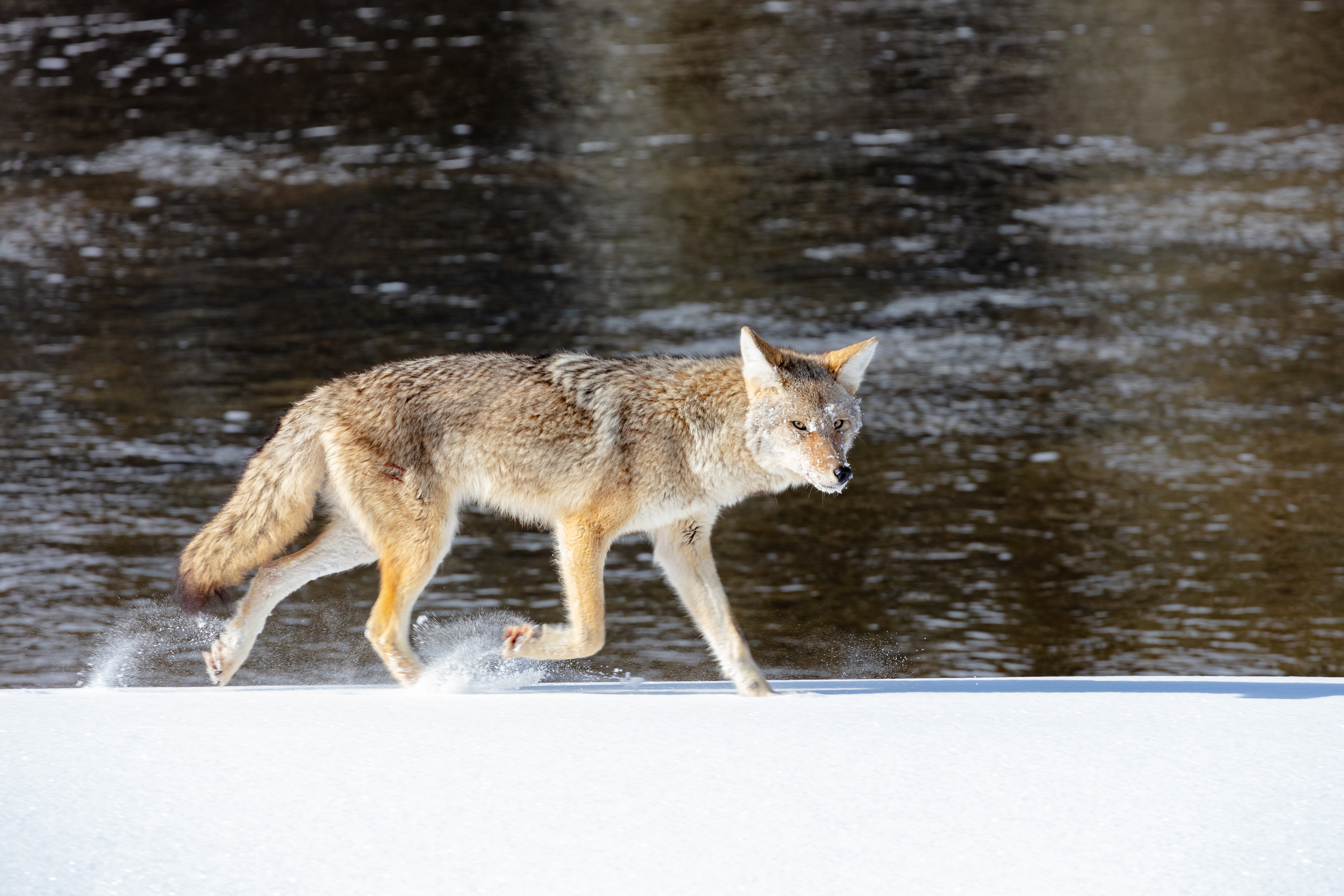
Coyote by the Madison River

Yellowstone's coyotes (Canis latrans) are among the largest coyotes in the United States; adults average about 30 pounds (13–14 kg). and some weigh around 40 pounds (18 kg).

Coyotes live an average of about six years, although one Yellowstone coyote lived to be more than 24 before she was killed and eaten by a cougar. The coyote is a common predator in the park, often seen alone or in packs, traveling through the park's wide open valleys hunting small mammals. But they are widely distributed and their sign can also be found in the forests and thermal areas throughout Yellowstone. They are capable of killing large prey, especially when they cooperatively hunt.

The reintroduction of wolves in 1995 has significantly decreased the coyote population, although those who remain often scavenge from wolf kills. Throughout the restoration project, coyote research has continued, with an eye toward identifying the interactions between coyotes and wolves and on assessing the effects of wolves on coyote populations. During planning and environmental assessment of the effects of wolf restoration, biologists anticipated that coyotes would compete with the larger canid, perhaps resulting in disruption of packs and numerical declines.

Coyotes occasionally lose their wariness of humans and frequent roadsides or developed areas, becoming conditioned to human food by receiving handouts or picking up food scraps. They can quickly learn bad habits like roadside begging behavior. This leads to potential danger for humans and coyotes. Several instances of coyote aggression toward humans have occurred in the park, including one that involved an actual attack. Habituation most likely played a role in this unusual coyote behavior.

=== Elk ===
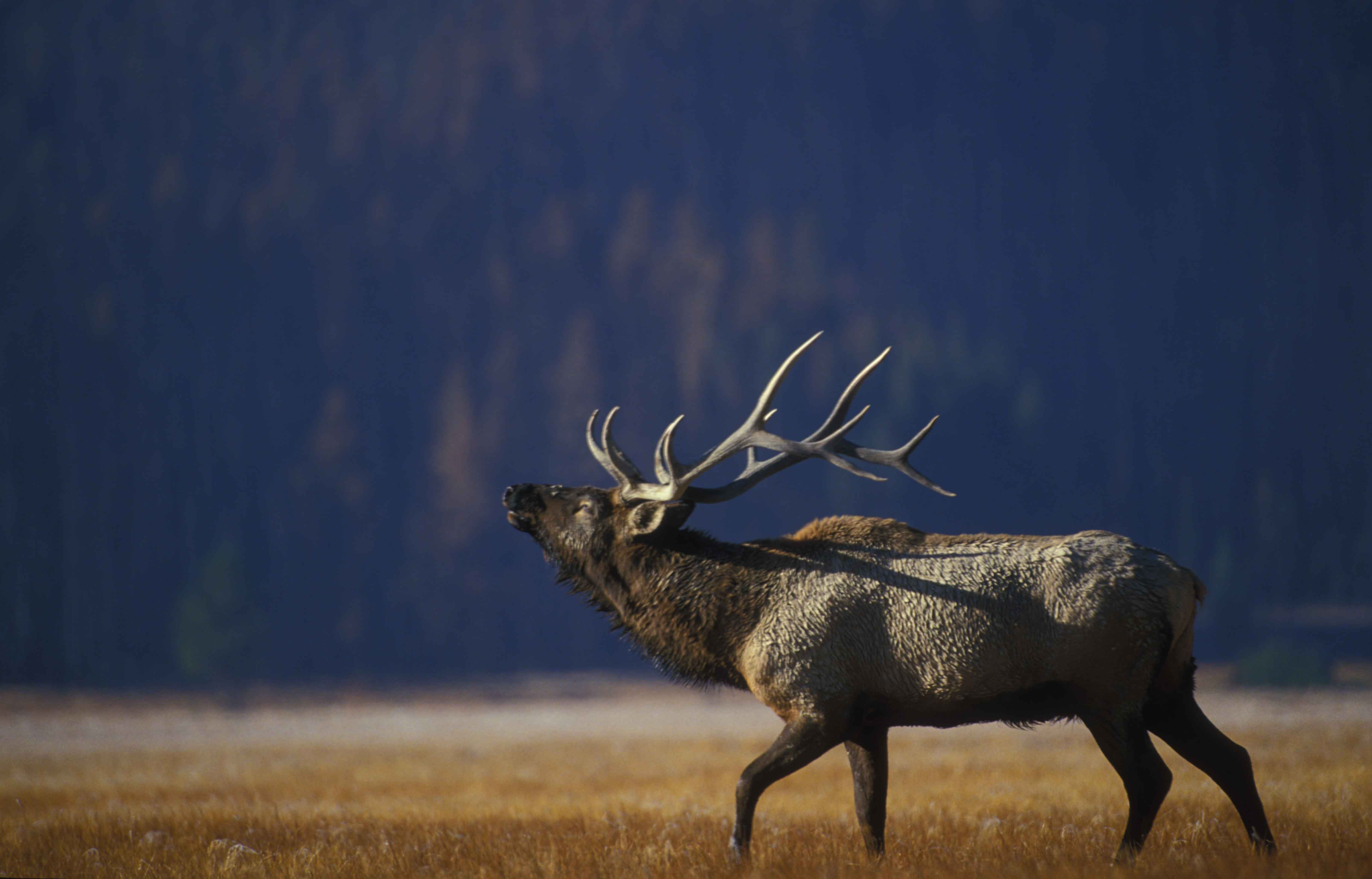
Bull elk

Elk or wapiti (Cervus canadensis) are the most abundant large mammal found in Yellowstone; paleontological evidence confirms their continuous presence for at least 1,000 years. Yellowstone National Park was established in 1872, when market hunting of all large grazing animals was rampant. Not until after 1886, when the United States Army was called in to protect the park and wildlife slaughter was brought under control, did the large animals increase in number. In recent years, however, Yellowstone's elk population has plummeted. The Northern Herd, the only herd that winters in the park, has declined from nearly 20,000 animals in 1994 to less than 4,000 in 2013. Ecologists have linked this decline to a declining population of cutthroat trout in Yellowstone Lake, caused by invasive lake trout. With less fish to eat, grizzly bears began to eat more elk calves, causing a steep decline in elk numbers.

More than 30,000 elk from 7-8 different herds summer in Yellowstone and approximately 15,000 to 22,000 winter in the park. The subspecies of elk that lives here are found from Arizona to northern Canada along the Rocky Mountain chain; other species of elk were historically distributed from coast to coast, but disappeared from the eastern United States in the early 19th century. Some other subspecies of elk still occupy coastal regions of California, Washington, and Oregon. Elk are the second largest member of the deer family (moose are the largest). Adult males, or bulls, range upwards of 700 pounds (~320 kg) while females, or cows, average 500-525 pounds (~225–240 kg). Their coats are reddish brown with heavy, darker-colored manes and a distinct yellowish rump patch. Elk usually live about 15 years in the wild.

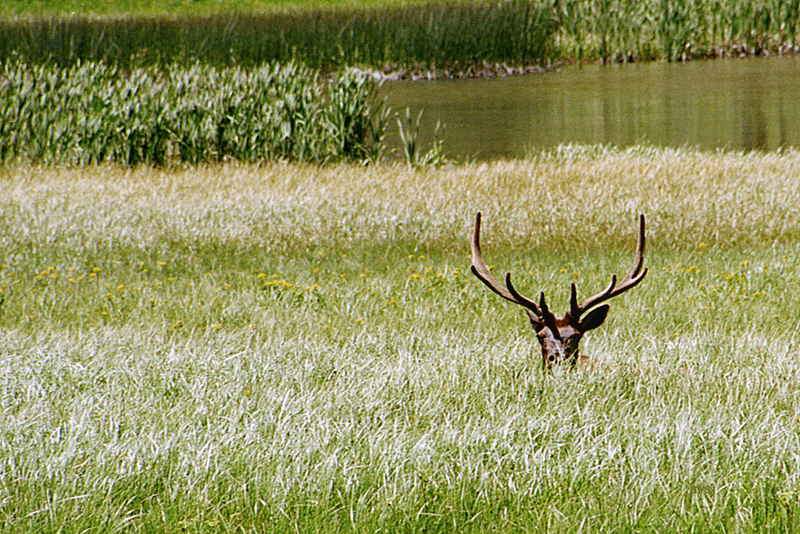
Bull elk with 8-pointed rack in tall grass

Bulls grow antlers annually from the time they are nearly one year old. When mature, a bull's "rack" may have 6 to 8 points or tines on each side and weigh more than 30 pounds. The antlers are usually shed in March or April, and begin regrowing in May, when the bony growth is nourished by blood vessels and covered by furry-looking "velvet." Antler growth ceases each year by August, when the velvet dries up and bulls begin to scrape it off by rubbing against trees, in preparation for the autumn mating season or rut. A bull may gather 20-30 cows into his harem during the mating season, often clashing or locking antlers with another mature male for the privilege of dominating the herd group. By November, mating season ends and elk generally move to their winter ranges. Calves weighing 25-40 pounds are born in late May or early June.

=== Moose ===
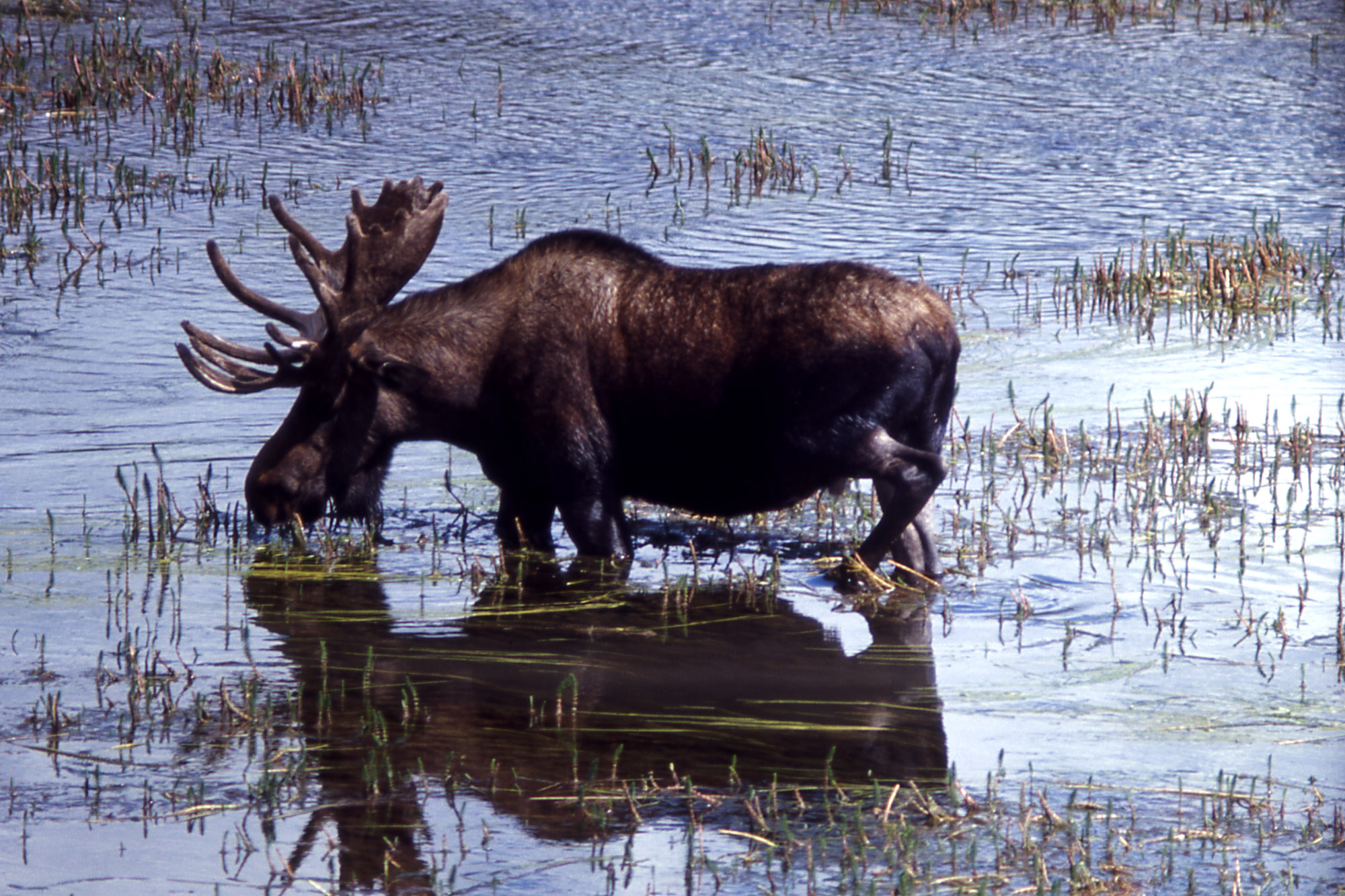
Moose in Hayden Valley

Moose (Alces alces shirasi Nelson), the largest member of the deer family, were reportedly very rare in northwest Wyoming when Yellowstone National Park was established in 1872. Subsequent protection from hunting and wolf control programs may have contributed to increased numbers but suppression of forest fires probably was the most important factor, since moose here depend on mature fir forests for winter survival.

Surveys in the late 1980s suggested a total park population of fewer than 1000 moose. The moose calf crop has been declining since the fires of 1988. During that summer there was also high predation of moose by grizzly bears in small patches of surviving timber. The winter following the fires many old moose died, probably as a combined result of the loss of good moose forage and a harsh winter. The fires forced some moose into poorer habitats, with the result that some almost doubled their home range, using deeper snow areas than previously, and sometimes browsing burned lodgepole pines.

Moose are commonly observed in the park's southwestern corner along the Bechler and Fall rivers, in the riparian zones around Yellowstone Lake, in the Soda Butte Creek, Pelican Creek, Lewis River, and Gallatin River drainages, and in the Willow Park area between Mammoth and Norris. Summer moose migrations from south and west of the park into Yellowstone have been confirmed by radio telemetry. Moose usually live to 20 years in the wild.

=== Mountain goats ===
Mountain goats (Oreamnos americanus) are not native in the park but were introduced into the Absaroka Range in Montana in the 1940s. They migrated into the park and breeding populations established themselves in the northwestern and northeastern regions of the park in the 1990s. As of 2008, the number of goats in and adjacent to the park is estimated to be 175–225. This colonization of a non-native species has raised concerns about adverse effects on alpine habitats. Surveys in 2002 and 2003 suggest that ridgetop vegetation cover is lower, and barren areas along alpine ridges are more prevalent in areas with relatively high goat use. Competition with high densities of mountain goats could also negatively affect bighorn sheep, whose range overlaps with mountain goats. Mountain goats generally live 15 years in the wild.

=== Bighorn sheep ===
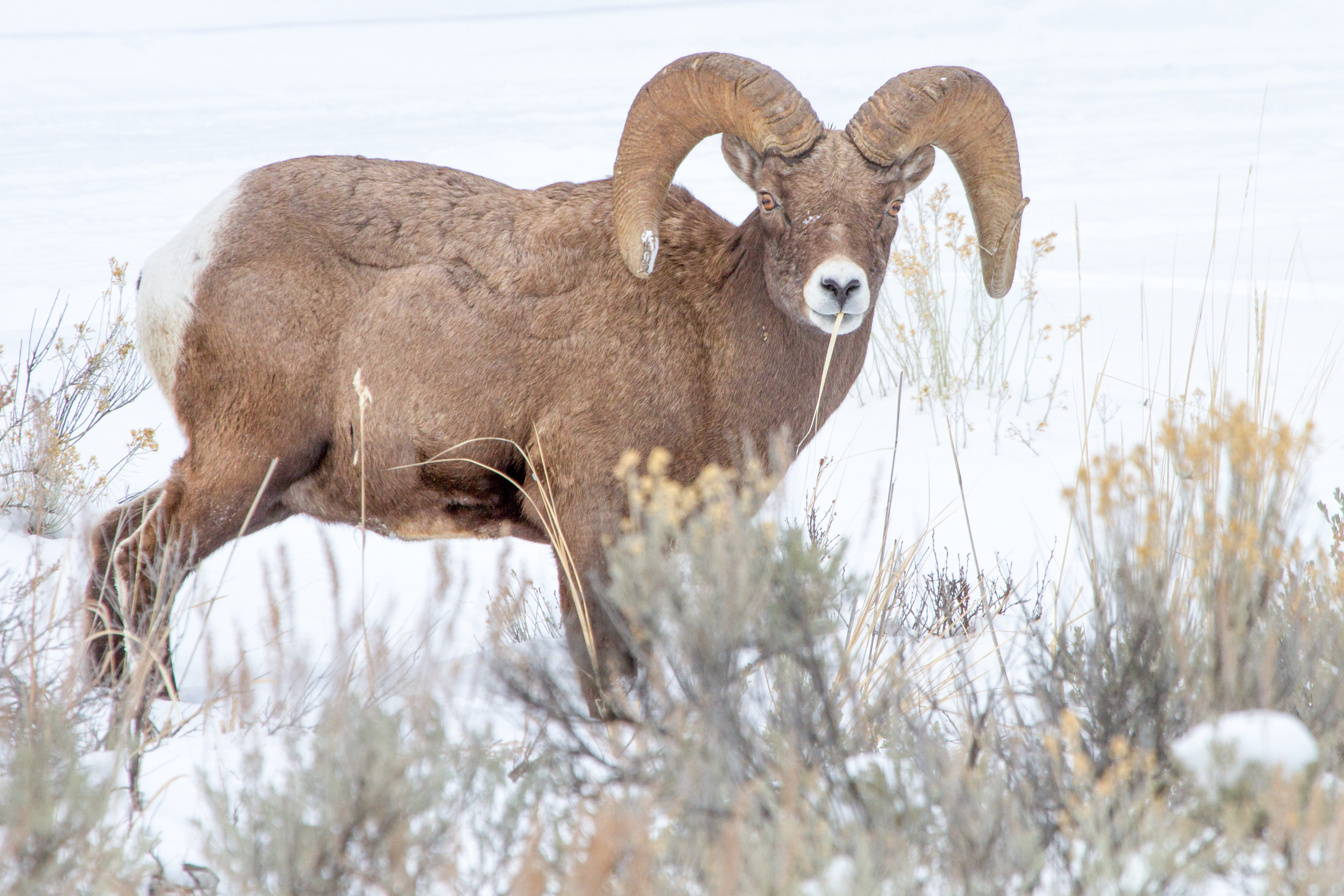
Bighorn sheep

Bighorn sheep (Ovis canadensis) were once very numerous in western United States and were an important food source for humans. The "Sheep eaters", a band of Shoshone people, lived year-round in Yellowstone until 1880. Their principal food was bighorn sheep and they made their bows from sheep horns. By 1900, during an "epoch of relentless destruction by the skin hunters", bighorn numbers were reduced to a few hundred in the United States. In 1897 about 100-150 were estimated to be present in the park. By 1912, despite a disease (scab) contracted from domestic sheep, bighorns in the park had increased to more than 200 and travelers could find them with fair certainty by devoting a few days to searching around Mount Everts, Mount Washburn or other well-known ranges. In winter, small bands of sheep could then be seen every day between Mammoth and Gardiner. Bighorn sheep usually live 10–15 years in the wild.

=== Mountain lions ===
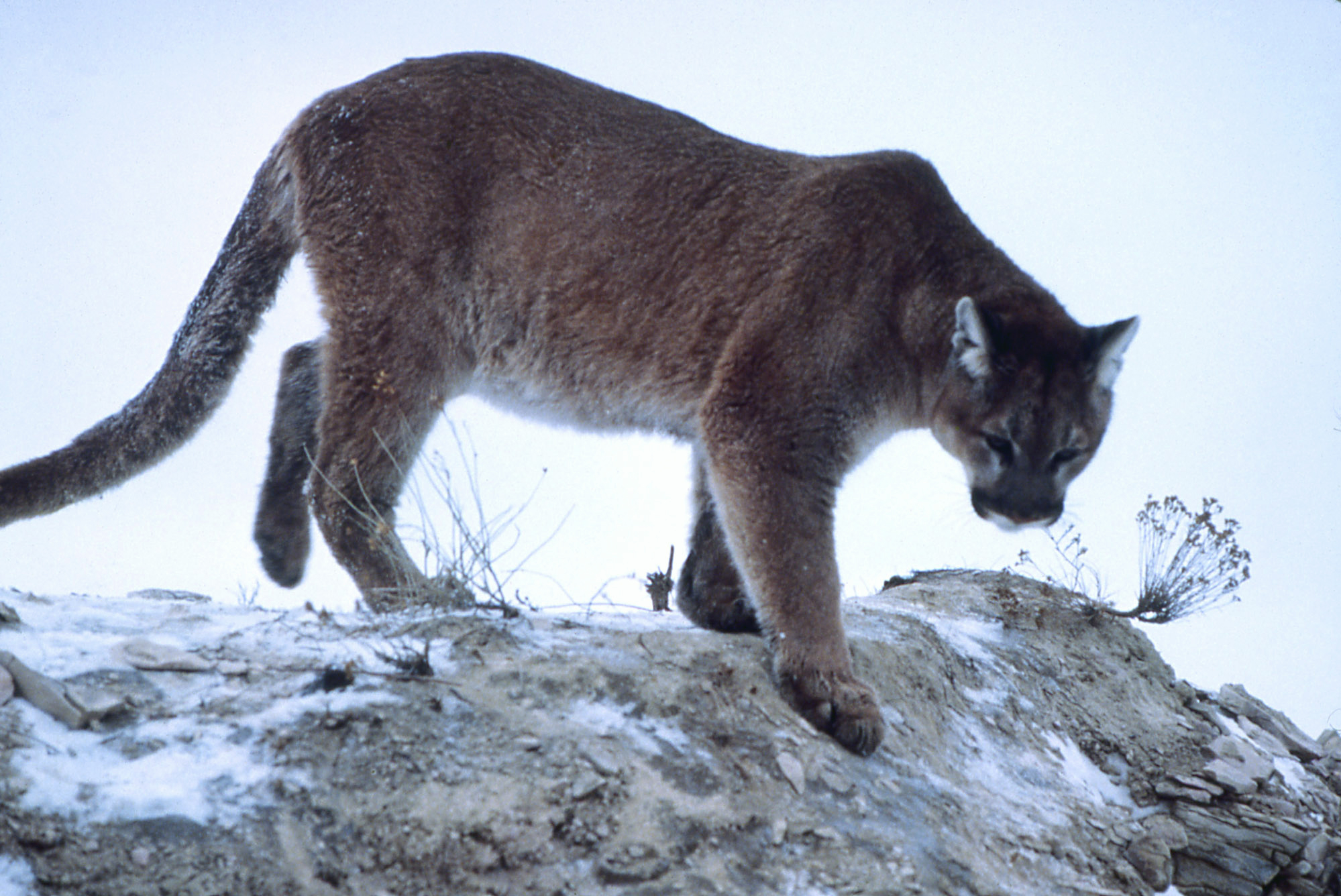
Mountain lion climbing down rock

The mountain lion (Puma concolor), also called the cougar, is the largest member of the Felidae family living in Yellowstone. Mountain lions can weigh up to 200 pounds (~90 kg), although lions in Yellowstone are thought to range between 140 and 160 pounds (~65 and ~70 kg) for males and around 100 pounds (45 kg) for females. Two to three kittens may be born at any time of year, although most arrive in summer and fall. For reasons that are not clear, only about 50 percent of kittens survive their first year. The current population of lions in Yellowstone is estimated to be 18-24 animals and is thought to be increasing. Mountain lions live an average lifespan of about 12 years in the wild.

Mountain lions were significantly reduced by predator control measures during the early 20th century. It is reported that 121 lions were removed from the park between the years 1904 and 1925. At that time, the remaining population was estimated to be 12 individuals. Mountain lions apparently existed at very low numbers between 1925 and 1940. Reports of lions in Yellowstone increased steadily from 1 each year between 1930 and 1939 to about 16 each year between 1980 and 1988. However, increases in visitor travel in Yellowstone and improvements in record keeping during this period probably contributed to this trend.

In 1987, the first study of mountain lion ecology was initiated in Yellowstone National Park. The research documented population dynamics of mountain lions in the northern Yellowstone ecosystem inside and outside the park boundary, determined home ranges and habitat requirements, and assessed the role of lions as a predator in the ecosystem. In recent years in other areas of the West, mountain lions have occasionally attacked humans. No documented lion/human confrontations have occurred in Yellowstone.

=== Mule deer and white-tailed deer ===
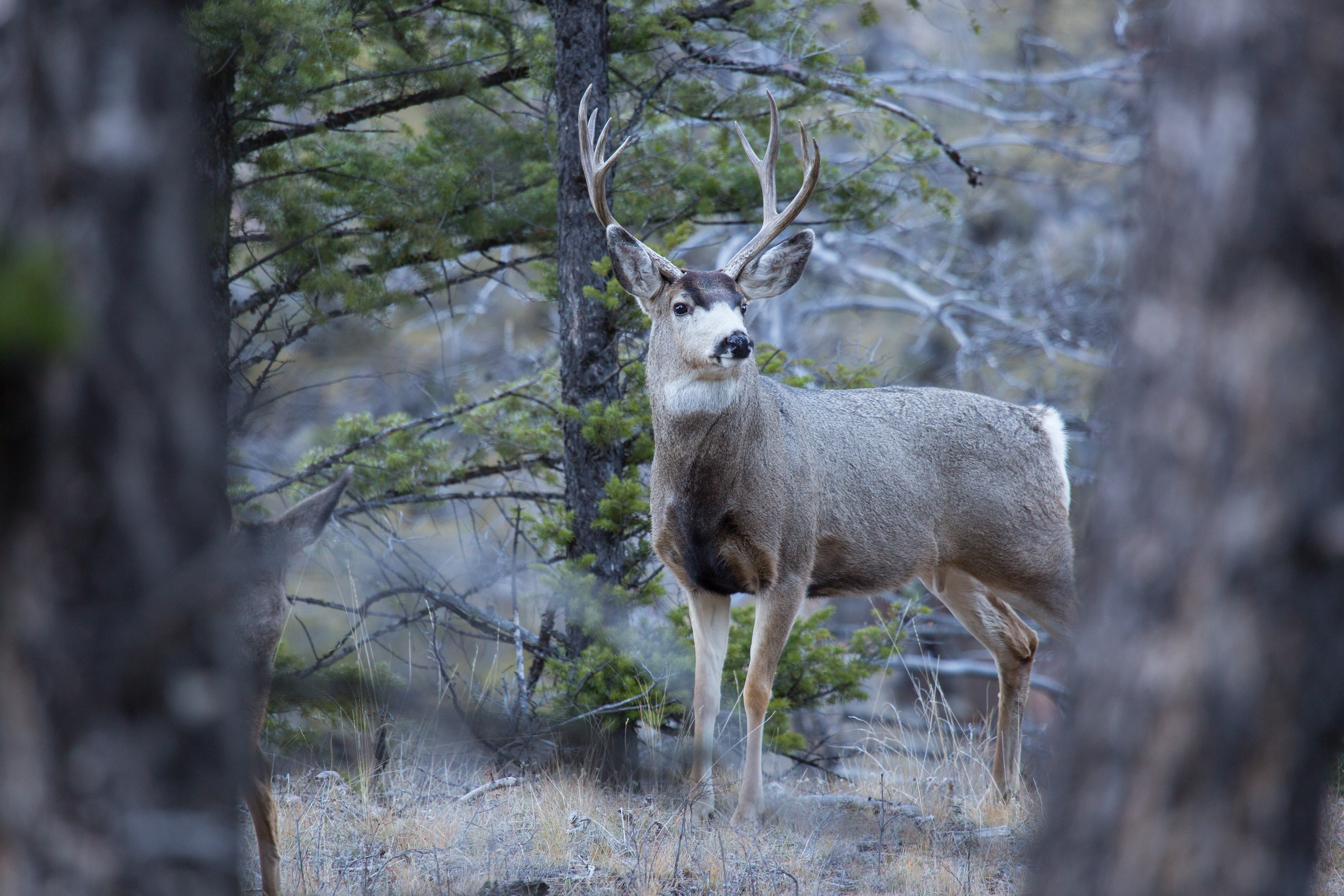
Mule deer

The mule deer (Odocoileus hemionus) is a deer whose habitat is in the western half of North America. It gets its name from its large mule-like ears. In Yellowstone mule deer are commonly found in forests, grasslands, and shrublands.

The white-tailed deer (Odocoileus virginianus) occurs in aspen parklands and deciduous river bottomlands within the central and northern Great Plains, and in mixed deciduous riparian corridors, river valley bottomlands, and lower foothills of the northern Rocky Mountain regions from Wyoming to southeastern British Columbia. It is an occasional visitor to these habitats in the Yellowstone region. Both mule and white-tailed deer live an average lifespan of 10 to 15 years in the wild.

=== Gray wolf ===
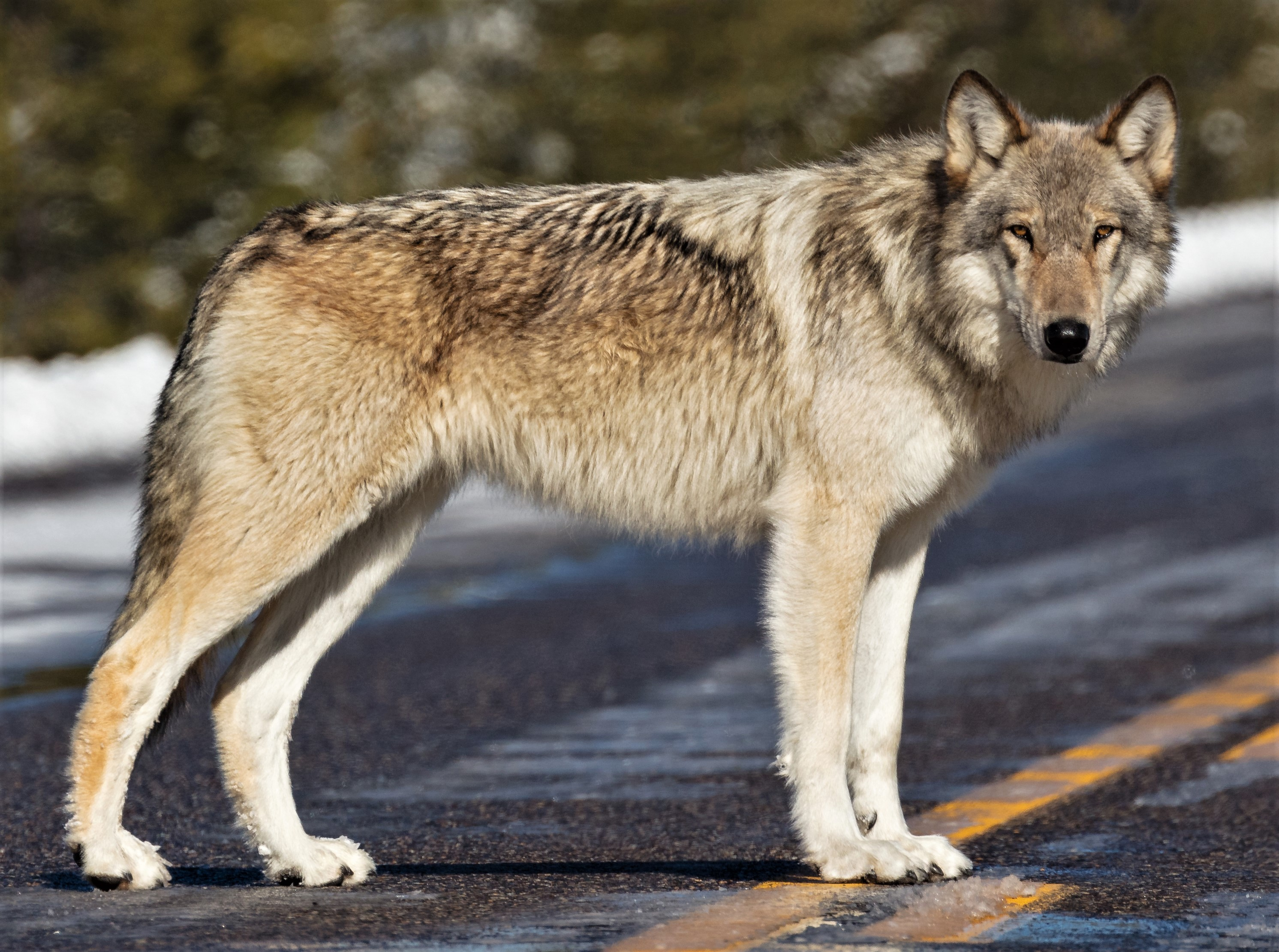
Gray wolf in the road near Artist Paint Pots

Northern Rocky Mountain wolves, a subspecies of the gray wolf (Canis lupus), were native to Yellowstone when the park was established in 1872. Predator control was practiced in the late 19th and early 20th centuries. Between 1914 and 1926, at least 136 wolves were killed in the park; by the 1940s, wolf packs were rarely reported. By the 1970s, scientists found no evidence of a wolf population in Yellowstone; wolves persisted in the lower 48 states only in northern Minnesota and on Isle Royale in Michigan. Canadian grey wolves were introduced into Yellowstone in 1995. This move has returned wolves to land that was once ruled by the canine. They currently exist in several packs, the largest of which are the Slough Creek, Yellowstone Delta, and Leopold packs. The wolves had to "re-learn" an instinct that their ancestors once had: hunting bison. Being used to the elk in Canada, the wolves were dumbfounded by the large, burly bison found all over Yellowstone. However, their main prey remains elk. They have made many appearances on National Geographic Channel documentaries. Wolves in Yellowstone can live as long as 10 years in the wild, though 6 to 8 is normal.

The United States Fish and Wildlife Service provides weekly updates on the wolves of the Rocky Mountain region including wolves of Yellowstone. This site has stated that at the end of 2011 there was at least 98 wolves in ten packs and two loner wolves in the park.

=== Red fox ===
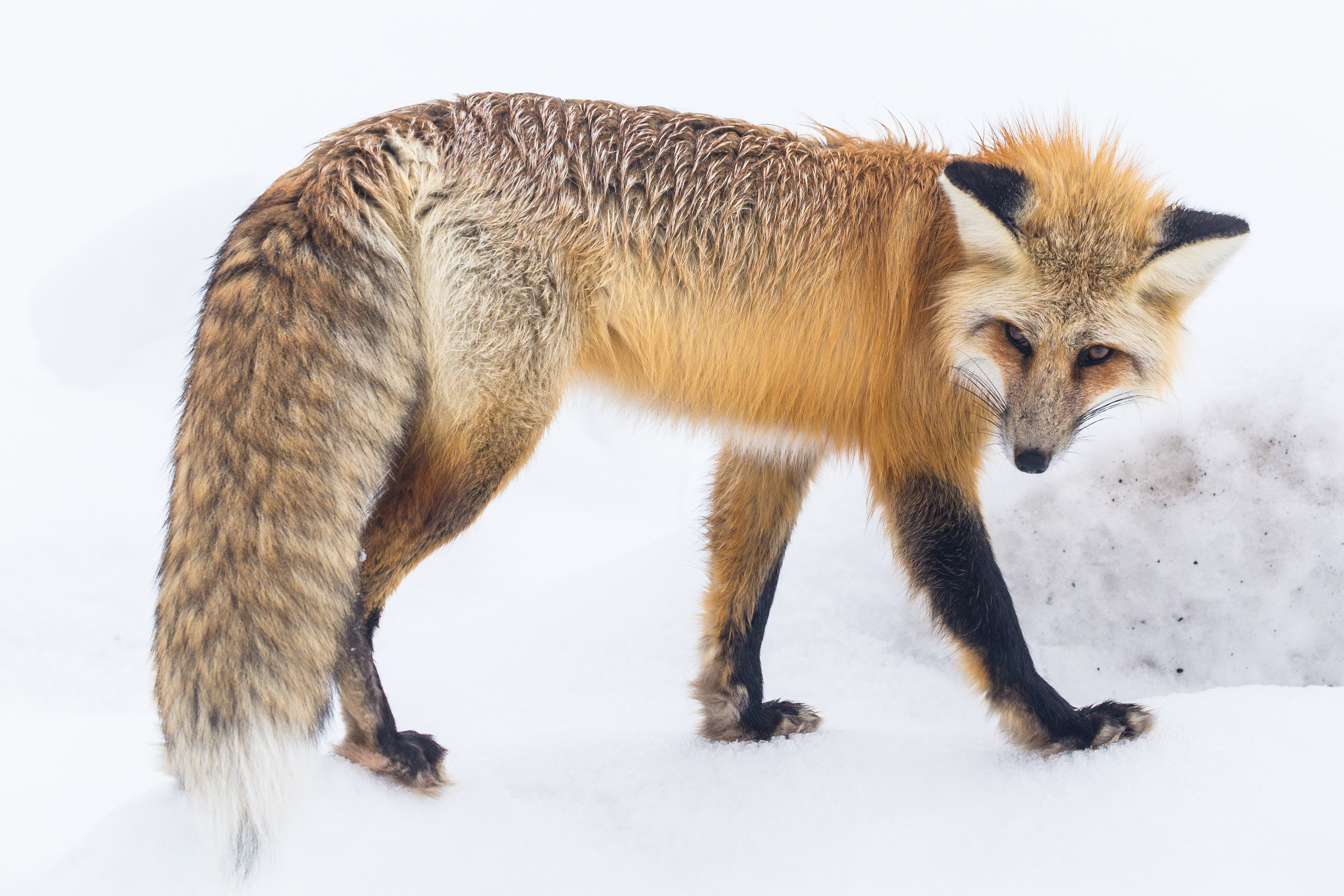
Red fox in Lamar Valley

A montane subspecies of red fox (Vulpes vulpes macroura) occurs in the park and Greater Yellowstone Ecosystem. These foxes are not overly common due to predation and displacement by the more common coyote. They are most commonly found in forested areas of the park.

== Small mammals ==
There are at least 50 small mammal species known to occur in Yellowstone National Park, including four common species of bats: big brown bat, little brown bat, long-legged bat, and silver-haired bat. Squirrels, rabbits, skunks, raccoons, badgers, otters, beavers, porcupines, vole, mice, and shrew species are common, but many are nocturnal and rarely seen by visitors. The Uinta ground squirrel, least chipmunk, golden-mantled ground squirrel and American red squirrel are commonly encountered.

Weasel species, including the North American river otter, are prevalent in the park. North American beaver (Castor canadensis) were almost trapped out of the park region prior to its creation. In 1998, beaver populations were making a comeback and an estimated 500 beavers were living in the park with the densest colonial in the Bechler River and Fall River region, the Yellowstone River delta above Yellowstone Lake and the lower Madison River and its tributaries.

== Birds ==
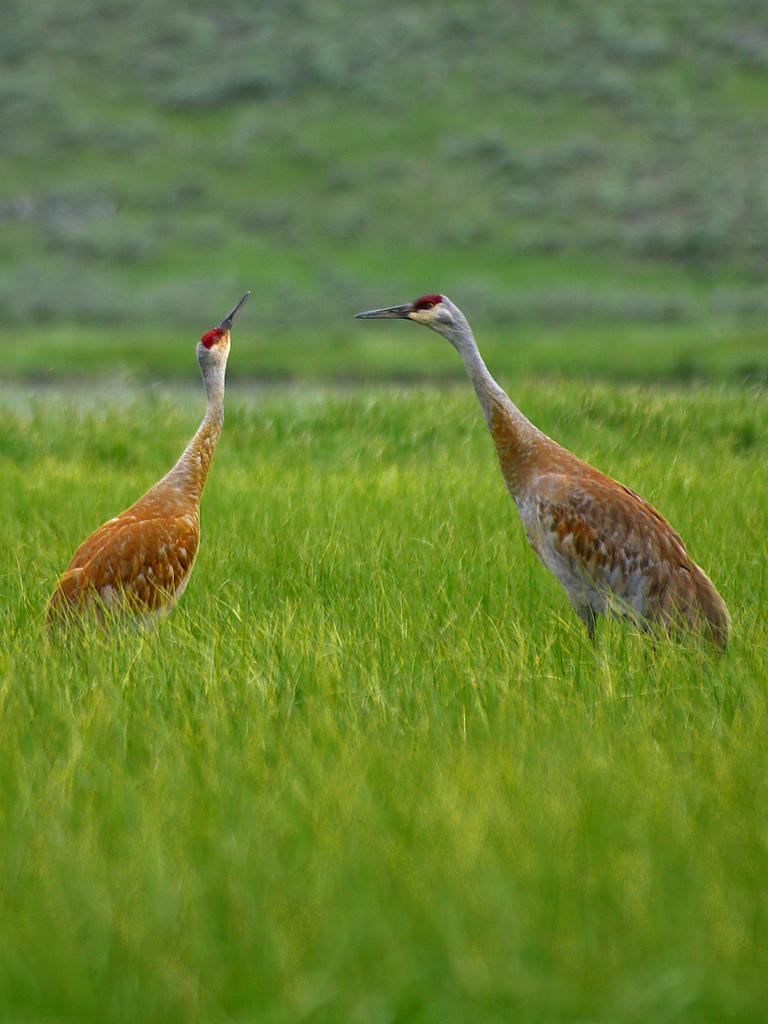
Breeding pair of sandhill cranes

Since the creation of the park in 1872, 318 species of birds have been documented within its boundaries. Although Yellowstone is not a birding mecca because of its high altitude and cold winters, it is home to a variety of interesting bird species that attract visitor attention every year. The park has a good resident population of bald eagles, trumpeter swans, common loons, ospreys, American white pelicans, and sandhill cranes. The extensive rivers, lakes and wetlands are summer homes to large numbers of waterfowl, while the forests and meadows host many different species of warblers, sparrows and other passerine birds.

== Amphibians and reptiles ==
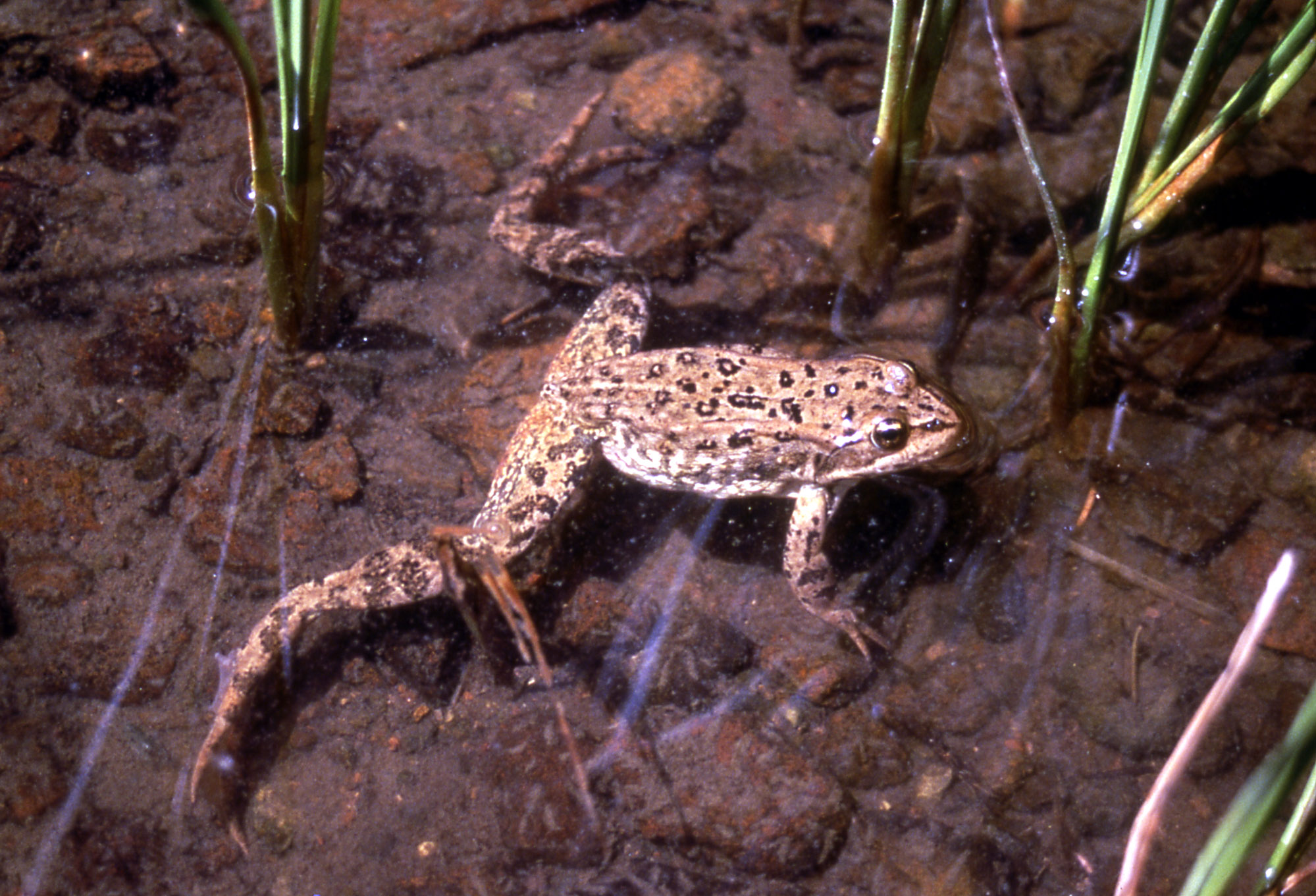
Columbia spotted frog

Yellowstone is home for four species of amphibians. Glacial activity and current cool and dry conditions are likely responsible for their relatively low numbers in Yellowstone.

Although no Yellowstone reptile or amphibian species are currently listed as threatened or endangered, several — including the boreal toad — are thought to be declining in the West. Surveys and monitoring are underway to try to determine if amphibian populations are declining in Yellowstone National Park. In 2014, a population of plains spadefoot toad was found in the park. More common species include the boreal chorus frog, columbian spotted frog, and the blotched tiger salamander.

Cool, dry conditions limit Yellowstone's reptiles to six species and population numbers for these species are not known. Known reptile species in the park: prairie rattlesnake (Crotalus viridis viridis), bullsnake (Pituophis catenifer sayi), valley garter snake (Thamnophis sirtalis fitchi), wandering garter snake (Thamnophis elegans vagrans), rubber boa (Charina bottae), sagebrush lizard (Sceloporus graciosus graciosus).

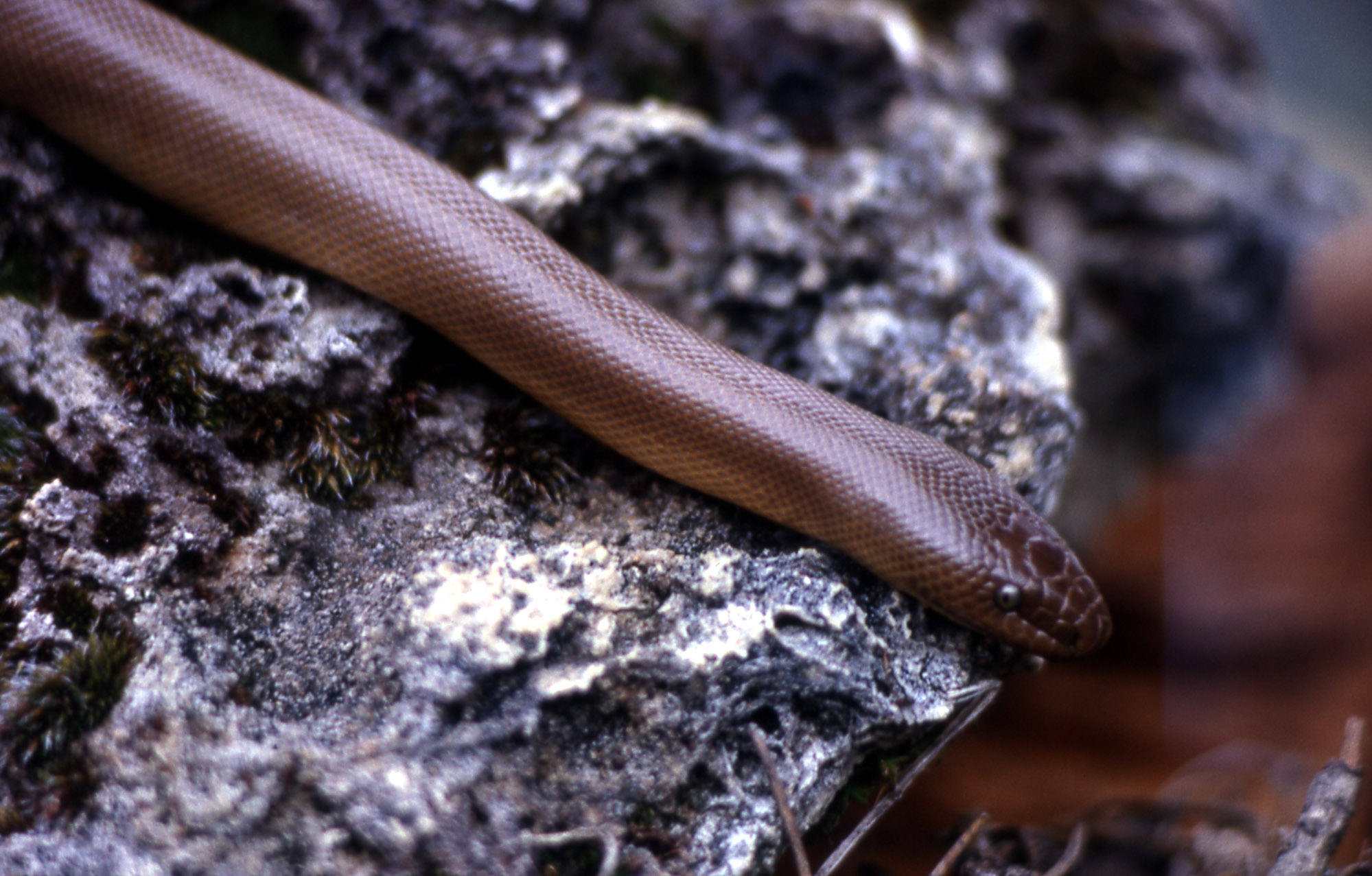
Rubber boa

In 1991 park staff began cooperating with researchers from Idaho State University to sample additional park habitats for reptiles and amphibians. This led to establishment of long-term monitoring sites in the park. The relatively undisturbed nature of the park and the baseline data may prove useful in testing hypotheses concerning the apparent declines of several species of toads and frogs in the western United States. Reptile and amphibian population declines may be caused by such factors as drought, pollution, disease, predation, habitat loss and fragmentation, introduced fish and other non-native species.

== Fish ==
Yellowstone Lake supports the largest inland population of cutthroat trout in the world, and is the core of the remaining undisturbed habitat for native Yellowstone cutthroat trout (Oncorhynchus clarki bouvieri) in the Yellowstone ecosystem. Each spring, cutthroat trout migrate from the lake to its tributaries to spawn.

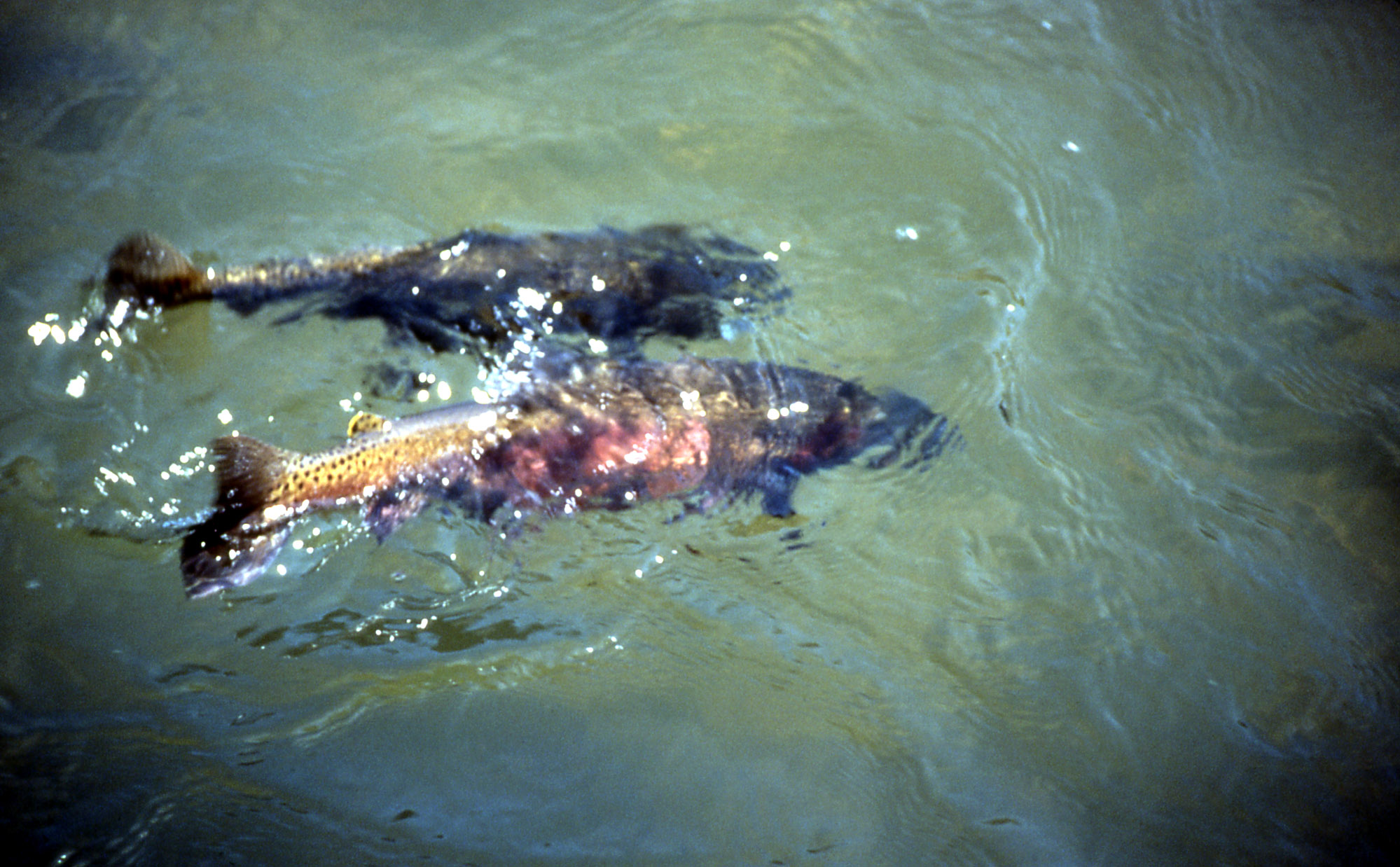
Cutthroat trout

Yellowstone cutthroat trout generally declined in the second half of the 20th century due to angler overharvest, competition with exotic fishes, and overzealous egg collection. Populations rebounded in the park after the advent of catch-and-release-only fishing rules in the 1970s, but new and aggressive invaders are causing an increasing threat to these native fish and alarming park fisheries biologists. Nonnative lake trout, an effective fish predator, were discovered in Yellowstone Lake in 1994. Throughout the west cutthroat trout populations preyed upon by introduced lake trout have typically declined, exhibited lower growth, or have disappeared. Aggressive lake trout control efforts by the National Park Service and no harvest limits have resulted in removing thousands of lake trout from Yellowstone Lake since 1994, including more than 12,000 in 2000. Still, the number of Yellowstone cutthroat trout monitored during the annual fall count in Yellowstone Lake was lower in recent years than at any other time in the 25-year history of the monitoring effort. Whirling disease, which has been implicated in recent years in the decline of trout populations in many western states, was discovered in Yellowstone Lake in 1998. So far, it is unclear which of these two nonnative invaders has been the greater factor in the decline of Yellowstone cutthroat trout, but there is no question they are causing it.

Yellowstone cutthroat trout have declined throughout the west and are currently designated as a "Species of Special Concern-Class A" by the American Fisheries Society. A formal petition to list this subspecies as "threatened" throughout its range was submitted to the U.S. Fish and Wildlife Service in 1998. Yellowstone National Park represents approximately 91% of the current range of Yellowstone cutthroat trout and contains 85% of the historical lake habitat for this subspecies, so the park is considered crucial to the survival of the species.

Other native sport fish, including westslope cutthroat trout and Montana grayling, have been under catch-and-release-only fishing rules since 1973. This is the first time mountain whitefish have been placed under such rules in Yellowstone National Park. The new rule gives mountain whitefish equal status to the other native sport fish in the park.

== See also ==
- List of animals of the Rocky Mountains
