= Terraced Falls =

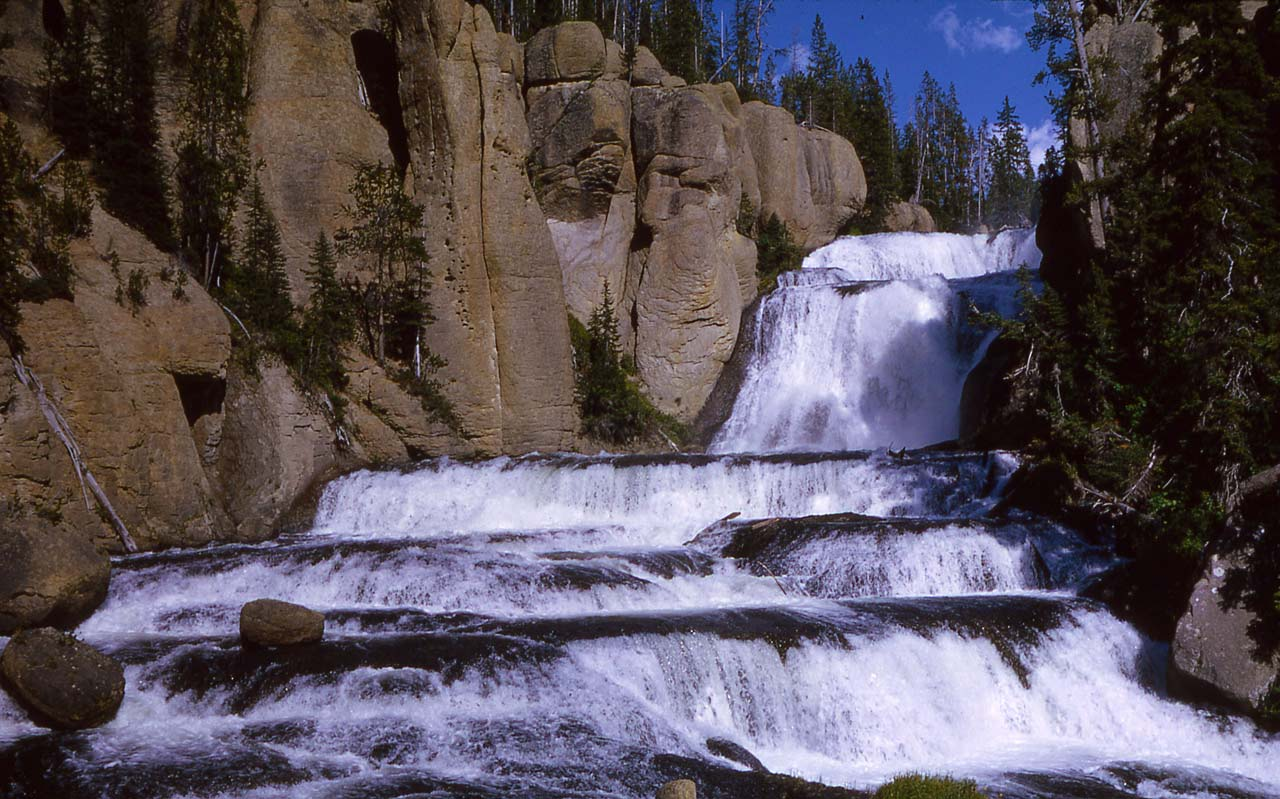
- Interactive map of Terraced Falls
- Location: Yellowstone National Park, Teton County, Wyoming
- Coordinates: 44°08′50″N 110°51′51″W
- Total height: 130 feet (40 m)
- Watercourse: Fall River

Terraced Falls ht. 130 feet (40 m) is a waterfall on Fall River in Yellowstone National Park. The highest waterfall on Fall River, Terraced Falls was probably named by the Hague Geological Survey in 1885–1886. An attempt was made to rename it "Totem Falls" in the 1920s, but the USBGN kept the original name. Terraced Falls is easily accessed via a short trail from the Ashton-Flagg Ranch Road along Yellowstone National Park's south border.

== See also ==
- List of waterfalls
- Waterfalls in Yellowstone National Park
