= National Register of Historic Places listings in Yellowstone National Park =

This is a list of the National Register of Historic Places listings in Yellowstone National Park.

This is intended to be a complete list of the properties and districts on the National Register of Historic Places in Yellowstone National Park, Wyoming and Montana, United States. The locations of National Register properties and districts for which the latitude and longitude coordinates are included below, may be seen in a Google map.

There are 19 properties and districts listed on the National Register in the park, five of which are National Historic Landmarks.

This National Park Service list is complete through NPS recent listings posted June 20, 2025.

== Current listings ==
	Name on the Register	Image	Date listed	Location	City or town	Description
1	Fort Yellowstone	Fort Yellowstone	July 31, 2003 (#03001032)	Mammoth and Norris, Wyoming; Gardiner, Montana; near Buffalo Lake, Idaho; 44°58′30″N 110°41′53″W	Yellowstone National Park	Headquarters complex and remote patrol cabins built during the initial administration of the park by the U.S. Army 1886–1918, establishing policies and procedures that influenced subsequent conservation and national park management.
2	Grand Loop Road Historic District	Grand Loop Road Historic District	December 23, 2003 (#03001345)	Grand Loop Rd. 44°42′12″N 110°35′36″W	Yellowstone National Park	The nation's first large planned park road system, developed 1872–1905 in challenging conditions by the Army Corps of Engineers under Hiram M. Chittenden (1858–1917). Comprises 140 miles (230 km) and nine 1930s bridges harmonized to the setting.
3	Lake Fish Hatchery Historic District	Lake Fish Hatchery Historic District	December 7, 1982 (#85001416)	Yellowstone Lake Rd. 44°32′59″N 110°24′15″W	Lake, Wyoming	Fish hatchery complex with nine rustic contributing properties built 1930–1932, a reminder of the 57 years of fish stocking in the park and changed conservation policies.
4	Lake Hotel	Lake Hotel	May 16, 1991 (#91000637)	235 Yellowstone Lake Rd. 44°32′59″N 110°24′01″W	Lake, Wyoming	The park's only surviving grand early hotel, established in 1891, altered and expanded in Colonial Revival style beginning in 1903 by Robert Reamer.
5	Lamar Buffalo Ranch	Lamar Buffalo Ranch	December 7, 1982 (#82001835)	Northeast Entrance Rd. 44°53′44″N 110°14′08″W	Lamar Valley	Five-building complex used for bison management 1907–1952, initially under cattle ranching methods, illustrating bison conservation, the evolution of wildlife management practices, and changing park ranger duties.
6	Madison Museum	Madison Museum	July 9, 1982 (#82001720)	Grand Loop Rd. and West Entrance Rd. 44°38′32″N 110°51′44″W	Madison Junction, Wyoming	1930 museum significant for its NPS rustic design and association with the park service's adoption of visitor education as an objective.
7	Mammoth Hot Springs Historic District	Mammoth Hot Springs Historic District	March 20, 2002 (#02000257)	North Entrance Rd. and Mammoth–Norris Rd. 44°58′27″N 110°41′56″W	Mammoth, Wyoming	The park's longstanding administrative and concession headquarters, with 192 contributing properties built 1891–1948. Associated with the development of Yellowstone and national park policies in general, the New Deal, and numerous architectural styles.
8	Norris Museum/Norris Comfort Station	Norris Museum/Norris Comfort Station	July 21, 1983 (#83003362)	Grand Loop Rd. 44°43′35″N 110°42′12″W	Norris Geyser Basin	Rustic 1929 museum and 1930s restroom dating to the early years of the National Park Service's visitor education initiatives.
9	Norris, Madison, and Fishing Bridge Museums	Norris, Madison, and Fishing Bridge Museums	May 28, 1987 (#87001445)	Norris Geyser Basin, Madison Junction, and Fishing Bridge; 44°33′47″N 110°22′40″W	Yellowstone National Park	Three trailside museums and a staff residence built 1929–1931, whose National Park Service rustic architecture was a major influence on buildings in national, state, and county parks around the U.S. during the New Deal.
10	North Entrance Road Historic District	North Entrance Road Historic District	May 22, 2002 (#02000529)	U.S. Route 89 between Gardiner and Mammoth; 45°00′00″N 110°41′34″W	Gardiner, Montana	Five-mile (8 km) entrance road and iconic 1903 Roosevelt Arch, associated with the park's planned road system, early Army Corps of Engineers contributions, seminal rustic style, and the first entrance marking at a national park.
11	Northeast Entrance Station	Northeast Entrance Station	May 28, 1987 (#87001435)	U.S. Route 212; 45°00′16″N 110°00′38″W	Silver Gate, Montana	Well-preserved park entrance complex with two buildings, constructed in 1935 and promoted in New Deal-era training guides as a paragon of rustic style for park facilities.
12	Obsidian Cliff	Obsidian Cliff	June 19, 1996 (#96000973)	Approximately 13 miles south of Mammoth; east side of U.S. Route 89 south of Obsidian Cliff Kiosk; 44°49′19″N 110°43′40″W	Mammoth, Wyoming	Pivotal Native American quarrying site for obsidian tools and ceremonial objects traded throughout the North American interior for 11,500 years. Also a key site in the development of geochemical analysis of stone archaeological artifacts.
13	Obsidian Cliff Kiosk	Obsidian Cliff Kiosk	July 9, 1982 (#82001719)	Grand Loop Rd. 44°49′26″N 110°43′45″W	Mammoth, Wyoming	The first roadside interpretive exhibit in the national park system, built in 1931 in superlative National Park Service rustic style.
14	Old Faithful Historic District	Old Faithful Historic District	December 7, 1982 (#82001839)	Both sides of Grand Loop Rd. at Old Faithful Geyser; 44°27′13″N 110°50′09″W	Upper Geyser Basin	Visitor service complex representing the NPS's early-20th-century development of automobile tourist facilities and its aesthetic use of rustic architecture even on utilitarian buildings.
15	Old Faithful Inn	Old Faithful Inn	July 23, 1973 (#73000226)	3200 Old Faithful Inn Rd. 44°27′35″N 110°49′52″W	Upper Geyser Basin	Masterful and rare surviving example of a log hotel, built 1903–1927; a key precursor of National Park Service rustic style and hotel design. Also a contributing property to the Old Faithful Historic District.
16	Queen's Laundry Bath House	Queen's Laundry Bath House	July 25, 2001 (#01000790)	Sentinel Meadows; 44°33′49″N 110°52′14″W	Lower Geyser Basin	Ruins of an 1881 bath house, the first federally-funded visitor facility built in a national park. Also associated with Philetus Norris (1821–1885) and the park's early years under a civilian superintendent.
17	Red Lodge-Cooke City Approach Road Historic District	Red Lodge-Cooke City Approach Road Historic District	May 8, 2014 (#14000219)	U.S. Route 212; 44°57′59″N 109°28′42″W	Cooke City, Montana	60-mile (97 km) alpine road built 1931–1936, better known as the Beartooth Highway. Significant for federal scenic route planning, new recreational access, and engineering in challenging conditions.
18	Roosevelt Lodge Historic District	Roosevelt Lodge Historic District	April 4, 1983 (#83003363)	100 Roosevelt Lodge Rd. 44°54′45″N 110°25′01″W	Tower Junction, Wyoming	Rustic lodge and cabin complex with 124 contributing properties built 1919–1938, associated with the park's early educational programs and development of accommodations for middle-class automobile tourists.
19	US Post Office-Yellowstone Main	US Post Office-Yellowstone Main	May 19, 1987 (#87000789)	114 Albright Ave. 44°58′37″N 110°41′56″W	Mammoth, Wyoming	1937 post office, the only example in the western U.S. merging a standard Moderne plan with French Renaissance Revival elements. Also a contributing property to the Mammoth Hot Springs Historic District.

== See also ==
- National Register of Historic Places listings in Teton County, Wyoming
- National Register of Historic Places listings in Park County, Wyoming
- National Register of Historic Places listings in Park County, Montana
- List of National Historic Landmarks in Wyoming
- National Register of Historic Places listings in Wyoming
- National Register of Historic Places listings in Montana
