= Roosevelt Lodge Historic District =

Historic district in Wyoming, United States

- U.S. National Register of Historic Places
- U.S. Historic district
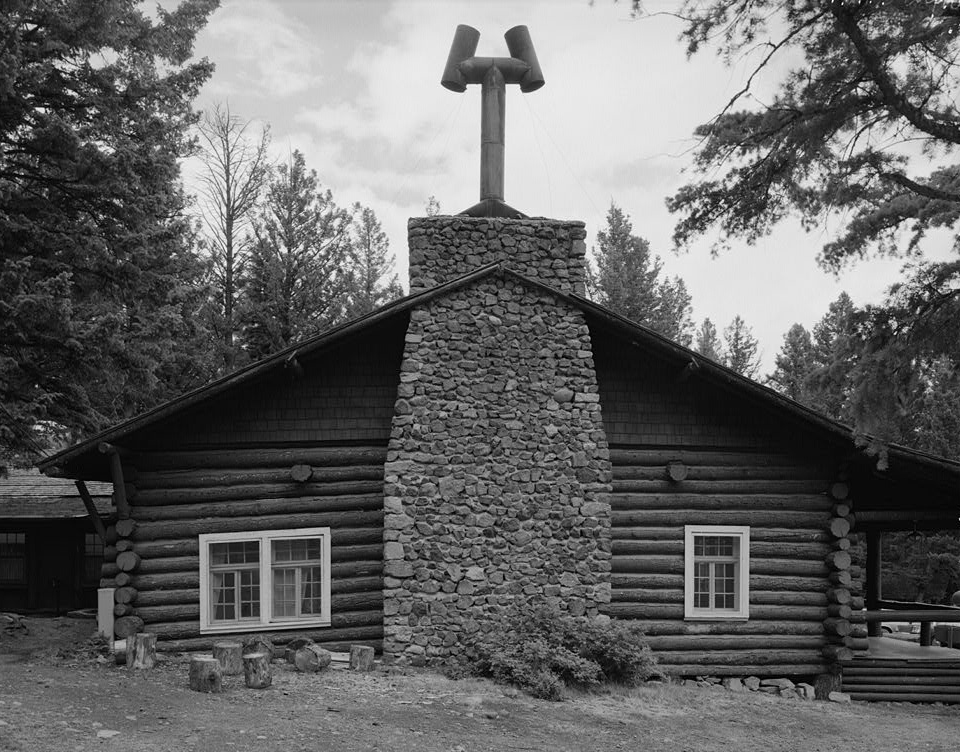

- Location within Wyoming Location within the United States
- Location: Yellowstone National Park, Wyoming
- Coordinates: 44°54′47″N 110°24′56″W
- Built: 1919
- Architect: Yellowstone Park Company; Hayes, Inc.
- MPS: Yellowstone National Park MPS
- NRHP reference No.: 83003363
- Added to NRHP: April 4, 1983

The Roosevelt Lodge Historic District comprises the area around the Roosevelt Lodge in the northern part of Yellowstone National Park, near Tower Junction. The district includes 143 buildings ranging in size from cabins to the Lodge, built beginning in 1919. The Lodge was first conceived as a field laboratory for students and educators conducting research in the park. It later became a camp for tourists, specifically designed to accommodate automobile-borne tourists. The Lodge is a simplified version of the National Park Service Rustic style.

The location is close to the reputed campsites of U.S. Presidents Chester A. Arthur and Theodore Roosevelt. In commemoration of Roosevelt's 1903 visit, a tent camp called Camp Roosevelt was set up by the Wylie Permanent Camping Company.

The lodge was built in 1919, and with the nearby supporting buildings built in subsequent years, was planned to give the ambience of a dude ranch. Significant buildings include:

- Roosevelt Lodge: Built in 1919-1920, the L-shaped one story log building provides a communal meeting space and dining facility for visitors and staff. The larger spaces feature exposed log roof beams set into a lowered ceiling.
- Store: Built in 1936 for the Haynes Company, a small L-shaped log structure in the "logs out" style with flush sheathing between vertical logs.
- Caretaker's Cabin: Built in 1924 by the Yellowstone Company, a one-story log cabin.
- Manager's Cabin: Built in the 1920s by the Yellowstone Park Company, a one-story frame cabin.
- Powerhouse: A logs-out structure housing the auxiliary generator.
- Comfort Stations: Several buildings in the logs-out style

These structures are surrounded by a variety of utility buildings and visitor cabins. The cabins can be divided into four main types:

- Logs Out Cabins: Built 1924-1942, of frame construction with flush horizontal siding and log trim details.
- Board and Batten Cabins: Built between 1929 and 1947, of frame construction with board and batten siding and exposed log rafters or purlins.
- Flush Horizontal Siding Cabins: Built after the 1920s of frame construction with flush siding and exposed log purlins.
- Studs Out Cabins: The most recently constructed historic cabins, moved to Roosevelt from other locations, with framing exposed and sheathing on the inside.

The Roosevelt Lodge is located near Tower Junction on the Grand Loop Road, which is itself a National Historic District.

== See also ==
- Fort Yellowstone
- Grand Loop Road Historic District
- Lake Fish Hatchery Historic District
- Mammoth Hot Springs Historic District
- North Entrance Road Historic District
- Old Faithful Historic District
