= Old Faithful Historic District =

Historic district in Wyoming, United States

- U.S. National Register of Historic Places
- U.S. Historic district
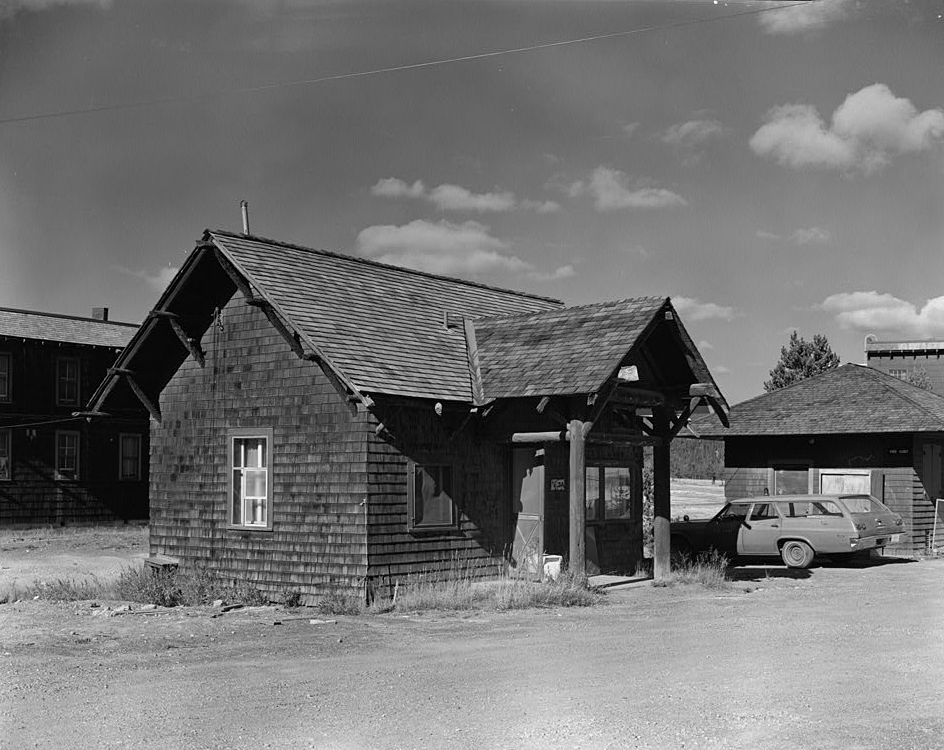

- Location within Wyoming Location within the United States
- Location: Yellowstone National Park, Wyoming
- Coordinates: 44°27′25″N 110°49′41″W
- Architect: Robert T. Reamer, Gilbert Underwood
- MPS: Yellowstone National Park MPS
- NRHP reference No.: 82001839
- Added to NRHP: December 7, 1982

The Old Faithful Historic District in Yellowstone National Park comprises the built-up portion of the Upper Geyser Basin surrounding the Old Faithful Inn and Old Faithful Geyser. It includes the Old Faithful Inn, designed by Robert Reamer and is itself a National Historic Landmark, the upper and lower Hamilton's Stores, the Old Faithful Lodge, designed by Gilbert Stanley Underwood, the Old Faithful Snow Lodge, and a variety of supporting buildings. The Old Faithful Historic District itself lies on the 140-mile Grand Loop Road Historic District.

A notable missing portion of the district is the Old Faithful Museum of Thermal Activity, which formed part of the trailside museum group that includes the Madison Museum, Norris Museum and Fishing Bridge Museum, all listed as National Historic Landmarks. The Old Faithful Museum was torn down in 1971 to make way for the Mission 66 visitor center, which in turn has been replaced by the Old Faithful Visitor Education Center.

== Buildings in the historic district ==
The following descriptions are derived from the November 2, 1982, nomination application.

The district is dominated by the Old Faithful Inn and consists of the Old Faithful Lodge, 3 stores, 2 service stations, 5 dormitories, 10 support buildings, and the guest cabins behind the Old Faithful Lodge and the Snow Lodge.

The first 11 buildings listed are of similar architectural style to the Old Faithful Inn and retain their architectural and historical integrity. The second set of 11 buildings have historical significance as support buildings and they are compatible with the historic scene. The cabins have historical significance and do reflect the type of cabin construction in Yellowstone National Park. While the cabins in the Old Faithful Lodge still retain some architectural integrity, the cabins behind the Snow Lodge have been altered considerably and have lost their architectural integrity.

- Building #2337 - Old Faithful Lodge. Construction began in 1923 with several additions made through 1927. The irregular plan building is of frame construction with stone masonry walls, wood-shingled exterior siding, and half log decorative elements. The lodge is approximately 28 feet long with a 52-by-45-foot (16 m × 14 m) extension, a 36-by-96-foot (11 m × 29 m) extension, and a 51-by-122-foot (16 m × 37 m) extension plus another 100-by-136-foot (30 m × 41 m) wing along the east side. The windows are casement and double hung. Stepped stone masonry columns and large log poles support the porte-cochère and other covered porches. Stepped stone masonry pilasters are used at some corners. The 19-room building has a wood-shingled, gable roof with a monitored roof over the recreation hall. Exposed log rafter ends and log brackets are used.
- Building #2306 - Powerhouse and Laundry. Built in 1929 by the Yellowstone Park Company, the one-story, two-room L-shaped frame structure with wood-shingle exterior siding on concrete foundation has a wood-shingled gable roof with louvered type windows. The building has exposed log rafter ends. It is approximately 121 by 79 feet (37 m × 24 m) with the L extension being approximately 61 by 36 feet (19 m × 11 m). This building is scheduled to be reduced in size if laundry facilities are park centralized.
- Building #2310 - Caretaker's Quarters. Built in the late 1920s, the 1 1/2-story building has four rooms. The approximately 24-by-18-foot (7.3 m × 5.5 m) rectangular frame structure on concrete foundation has wood-shingle exterior siding and a wood-shingled gable roof with a transverse hip at one elevation. The windows are both double hung and casement. The building has exposed log rafter ends. The building is now the winter keeper's residence.
- Building #2311 - Laundry Manager's Residence. Built in 1926, the approximately 16-by-24-foot (4.9 m × 7.3 m) rectangular plan frame one-story structure has two rooms. The building has wood-shingle exterior siding and a wood-shingled gable roof with a transverse gable roof and casement window. The roof has exposed log rafter ends and large ridge poles which are compatible to the Old Faithful Inn.
- Building #2302 - Lower Service Station. This building was built by the Hamilton Store Company at an unknown date. It is a modified T-plan structure, approximately 80 by 24 feet (24.4 m × 7.3 m), with a 22-by-40-foot (6.7 m × 12.2 m) extension. The exterior walls are horizontal siding with vertical half-timbers. The roof is wood-shingled and extends over the gas pumps. Hamilton stores, Inc., and the National Park Service each have joint ownership of the building.
- Building #2303 - Lower Hamilton Store. Built as Klamer Store in 1894 and sold to Charles Hamilton in 1914. Hamilton expanded the store over the years. The modified U-plan is two-story with 13 rooms plus baths. The building is approximately 152 by 30 feet (46.3 m × 9.1 m), with the two extensions being approximately 21 by 83 feet (6.4 m × 25.3 m) and 39 by 83 feet (12 m × 25 m). The frame constructed building has novelty siding and a wood-shingled gabled roof with several transverse gables. Burled branches and logs are used as brackets and decorative elements on the north and east elevations. An unusual element is the use of the burled wood in spelling out HAMILTON STORES which hangs over the entrance to the salesroom. The interior is typical store design of the time, but the second floor contains a small sitting room called "The Million Dollar Room," papered with canceled checks whose total is $1,000,000. This fact is reportedly recorded in Ripley's Believe It or Not. Hamilton Stores, Inc., and the National Park Service have joint ownership of the building.
- Building #2780 - Photo Shop. Built in 1927 by Haynes, Inc., the T-plan structure, approximately 44 by 36 feet (13 m × 11 m) with the leg being 61 by 27 feet (18.6 m × 8.2 m). The two-story, 25-room store is of frame construction with half-log and shiplap siding. A porch extends across the front of the building. The wood-shingled gabled roof has exposed log rafter ends. The store reflects the concession architecture in Yellowstone National Park during the 1920s and 1930s. The building was moved to its present location in 1971.
- Building #2326 - Upper Hamilton Store. Built in 1929 by Hamilton Stores, Inc., as a store and employee dormitory. The two-story, 33-room structure is approximately 45 by 118 feet (14 m × 36 m), and in a U-shaped configuration. The windows are both casement and double hung sash. The walls are constructed of concrete laid to resemble hewn logs. The building is placed on a masonry stone foundation with stepped stone masonry pilasters and stepped stone masonry columns that support the two covered entrance porches. The eaves of the wood-shingled gabled roof are wood-shingled with exposed log rafter ends; log rafter purlins are used in the roof structure of the two covered entrance porches. The tips of the log rafter ends and the purlins are tapered and whittled to resemble beaver gnawnings. The building was originally part of the Old Faithful Auto Camp. Hamilton Stores, Inc., and the National Park Service each have joint ownership of the building.
- Building #2327 - Upper Gas Station. Built in 1929 by Hamilton Stores, Inc., the Latin Cross plan structure has two rooms with three of the wings canopied over the gas pumps. The walls are of concrete construction laid to resemble hewn logs. Stepped stone masonry pilasters are used at the corners, similar stone columns support the canopies. The gabled roof has wood shingles and exposed log rafter ends. The structure has casement windows. Hamilton Stores, Inc., and the National Park Service each have joint ownership of the building.
- Building #2305 - Old Faithful Inn. The Old Faithful Inn was listed on the National Register of Historic Places, July 23, 1973. Herein specifically, the nomination will be expanded to include the following interior spaces: The dining room, the lobby, Rooms 10, 127, 154, and 229. The rustic log quality of the exterior is carried throughout the interior. The lobby, a 64-foot-square space rising 85 feet to the ridgeline, is encircled with tiers of balconies used as lounges for the guests. The use of exposed logs for the ceilings, walls, the purlins and rafters are further accented by the use of vertical log supports of the second and third floor balconies and for the small open room near the ceiling called the "Crow's Nest." In earlier days, the "Crow's Nest" was used by musicians as a place to assemble and entertain the guests far below. The lobby is further enhanced by the lighting effect produced by the many glass dormer windows placed in the steep gabled roof. An immense 16-foot-square native stone fireplace with hearths on each of its four sides dominates one corner of the lobby. Tons of local stone were used in the construction of the fireplace. The fireplace towers to the ceiling. Suspended from the ceilings in the lobby and dining room are copper light fixtures designed by the Inn's architect, Robert Reamer. Imitation candlesticks, also designed by Reamer, are mounted on the log columns and form sconces on the log walls. The original log-walled dining room is open to the roof with the log ceiling supported by log scissor trusses. A massive rock fireplace, modified after the 1959 earthquake, centers on the south wall. In 1921, the south wall ground level windows were removed to install doorways for a new dining room addition. In 1927, a multisided addition was made to the east wall of the original dining room. The original wall was removed and replaced with three support columns and panels. Interesting and significant elements of the room and the 1921 dining room addition are the arabesque on the fir panels, the spare columns, and the frieze. The etched designs are of flora and fauna and are the only rustic touches in the room. The room was converted to "The Bear Pit" a more formal cocktail lounge in 1962. Room No. 10, off the west corridor on the first floor, is one of the original rooms with modified bathroom intact. The log walled room, approximately 12 by 14 feet (3.7 m × 4.3 m), has original built-in light fixtures and call buttons. The ceiling has the original end-to-end shingle covering. The adjoining bathroom has the original high tank oak toilet, clawfoot bathtub, and red marble lavatory. Linoleum covers the original fir flooring. The bathroom is approximately 10 by 12 feet (3.0 m × 3.7 m). Other typical hotel rooms with rustic qualities are No. 127 and No. 154, on the second floor, and No. 229, on the third floor. The walls and ceilings are rough-sawn pine. Room No. 127 has an adjoining bath with tongue and groove walls and original high tank toilet, clawfoot bathtub and white marble lavatory. Room No. 154 has wooden casement windows and a seating nook on the north window. Room No. 229 is similar to Room No. 154, but larger size. Part of the room is the opening provided by the dormer window. All of the rooms have non-historic lavatories added in the 1930s–1940s. The stairway in the west wing should be cited, the half-log stair and tread and gnarled railings, Original furnishings in the Old Faithful Inn are significant components of the building and the collection is a good representation from the Arts and Crafts Movement. In the public spaces are two or three styles of loose cushioned settees, arm chairs, rockers, and wing back chairs, octagonal base tables with leather tops and brass studded trim, and writing desks and chairs. These pieces of Mission Furniture probably came from a manufacturer in upstate New York. The dining room is still furnished with the natural hickory side chairs of rustic style from the Old Hickory Furniture Company. The Bear Pit has leather topped tables with brass studs. Some bedrooms have iron bedsteads with a brass printed finish, dresser with drop front drawers and wash stand stained green with copper tops.
- Building #2312 - Girl's Dormitory. Built in 1925, the L-plan building, approximately 170 by 63 feet (52 m × 19 m), has two stories and 80 rooms. It is of frame construction with exterior wood-shingle siding and wood-shingled mansard roof. The building is similar in design to the 1913 addition to the Old Faithful Inn.
- Building #2307 – Shop. Built in late 1920s, the one-room L-shaped frame structure on concrete foundation is approximately 28 by 51 feet (8.5 m × 15.5 m) and has wood-shingle exterior siding, and wood-shingled gable roof.
- Building #2309 - Shed. Built in late 1920s, the one-room 10-by-14-foot (3.0 m × 4.3 m) frame structure has wood-shingle exterior siding with wood-shingled hip roof and exposed log rafter ends.
- Building #2313 - Employees Laundry. Built in late 1920s, the rectangular 16-by-55-foot (4.9 m × 16.8 m) two-room, frame structure has wood-shingle exterior siding and wood-shingled gable roof.
- Building #2314 - U-Plan Dormitory. Built in 1913, the modified U-plan is approximately 200 by 71 feet (61 m × 22 m). The building is of frame construction with half-timber and shingle exterior siding. The one-story building has 8 rooms. The wood-shingled gable roof has exposed log rafter ends.
- Building #2315 - Engineers Dormitory. Built in 1913, the rectangular plan, approximately 30 by 17 feet (9.1 m × 5.2 m), frame structure has one-story and four rooms. The structure has exterior wood-shingle siding, exposed log rafter ends and a wood-shingled roof with a transverse gable along its length.
- Building #2316 - Employee's Dormitory. Built in 1926, the rectangular plan, approximately 25 by 49 feet (7.6 m × 14.9 m), frame construction is one-story with 8 rooms. The building has wood-shingle exterior siding and a wood-shingled gable roof with exposed rafter ends. The building reflects the design and construction of the Old Faithful Inn. The dormitory was built by the Yellowstone Park Company as a service building for the Inn. It is now used as a recreation facility for employees.
- Building #2338 - Linen Room. Built c. 1930, the two-story frame constructed building is an L-plan, approximately 60 by 30 feet (18.3 m × 9.1 m) with the extension being 30 by 16 feet (9.1 m × 4.9 m). The exterior has exposed log studs and shiplap siding; the gabled roof is wood shingled. The building is east of the Old Faithful Lodge's north wing. The upper floor is used as a dorm and the lower floor is used as a linen storage for the cabins in the lodge area.
- Building #2339 - Power Plant and Boiler House. The frame constructed L-plan buildings, approximately 57 by 52 feet (17 m × 16 m) with a 33-by-28-foot (10.1 m × 8.5 m) extension. The building has a half-timbered and wood-shingled exterior and a wood-shingled gable roof. The building is on a concrete foundation. The two buildings shown on the site plan (just north of building #2338) are 4-plex facilities built ca. 1930.
- Building #2343 - Dormitory (Cinderella Dorm). Built in 1940, the rectangular plan building is approximately 112 by 38 feet (34 m × 12 m). The exterior is half-timbered and plywood. The two-story structure, on concrete foundation, has a wood-shingle gabled roof. The building is east of the lodge.

== Gallery ==
Buildings and structures within the historic district
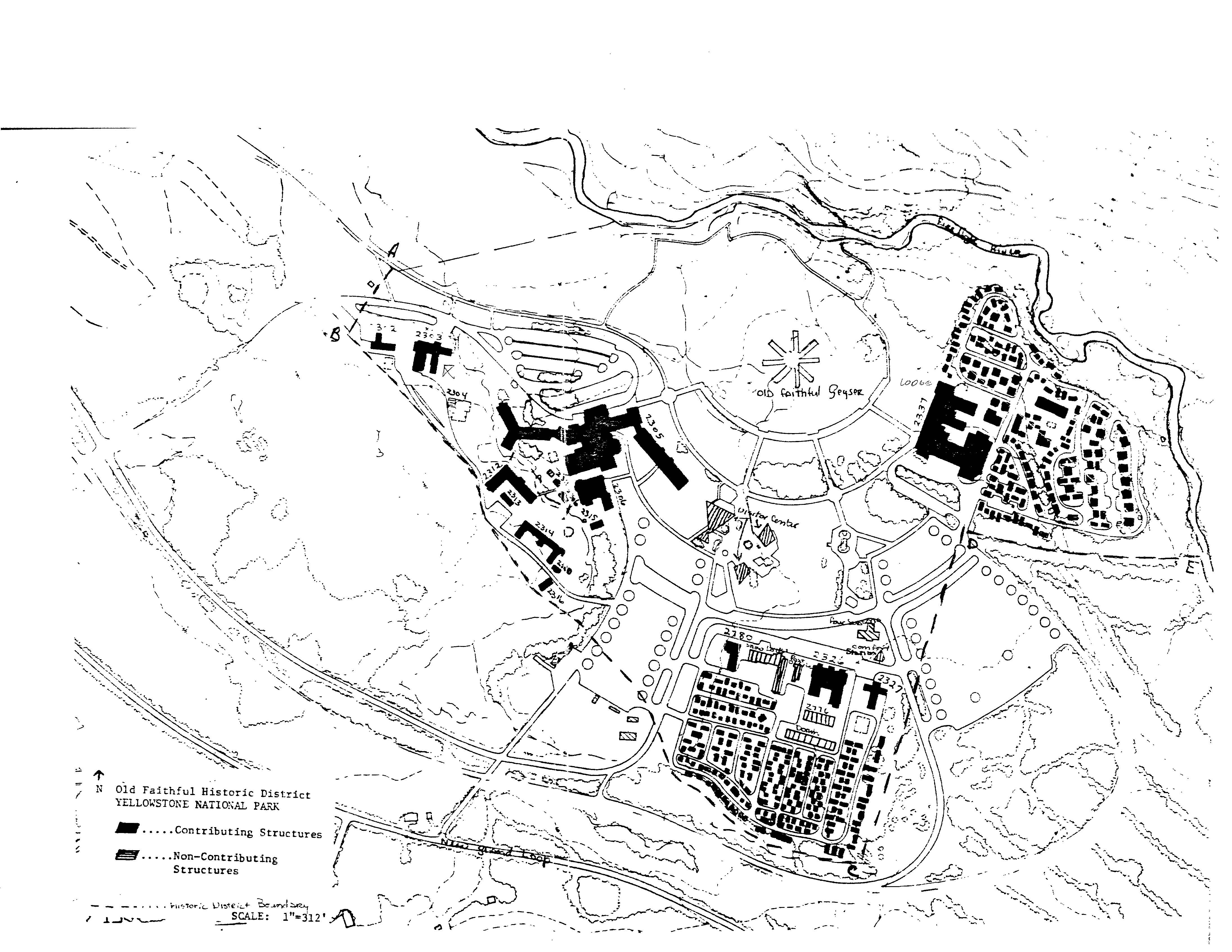
Map of historic district from original application, 1982

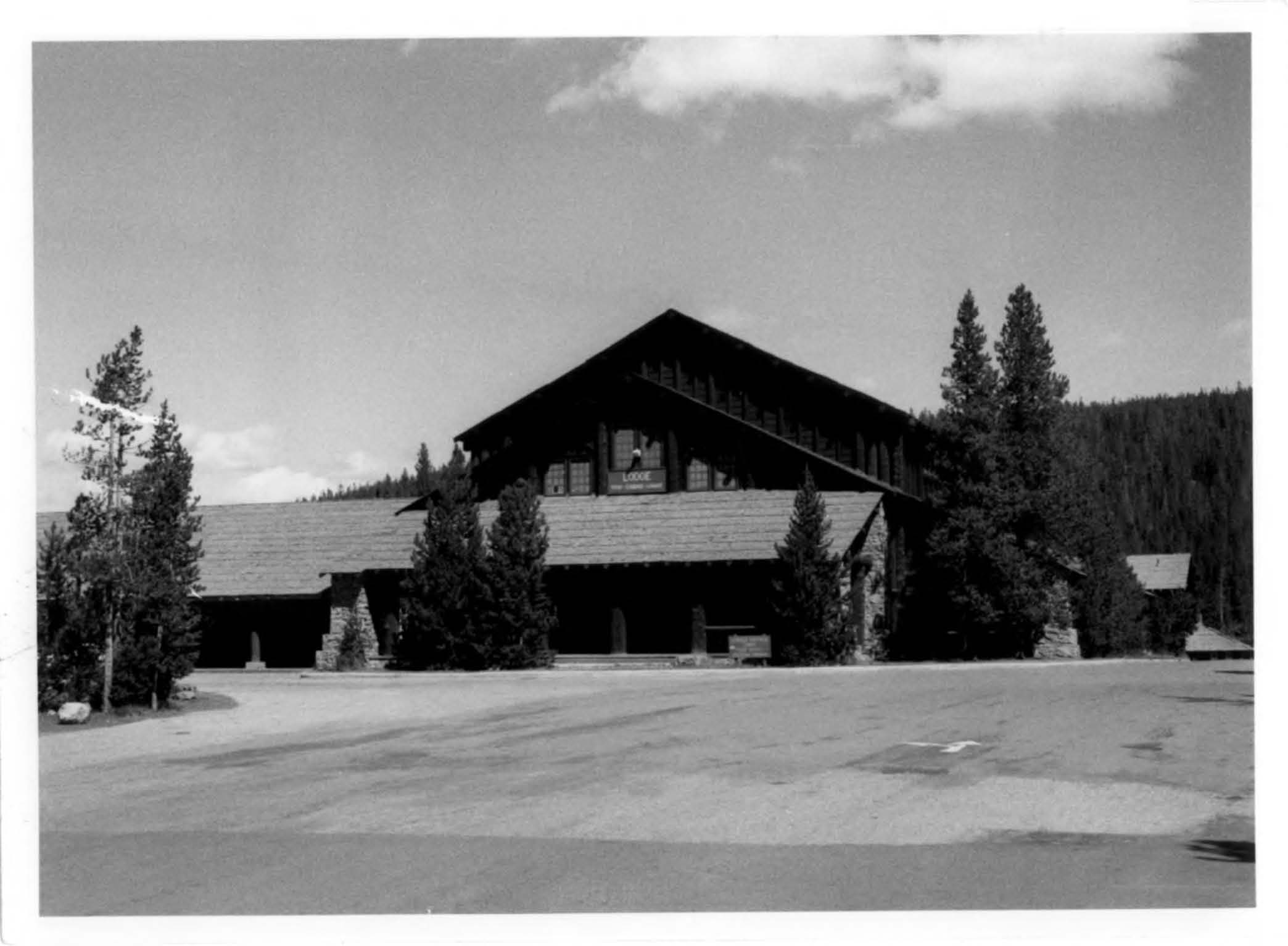
Building #2337, Old Faithful Lodge

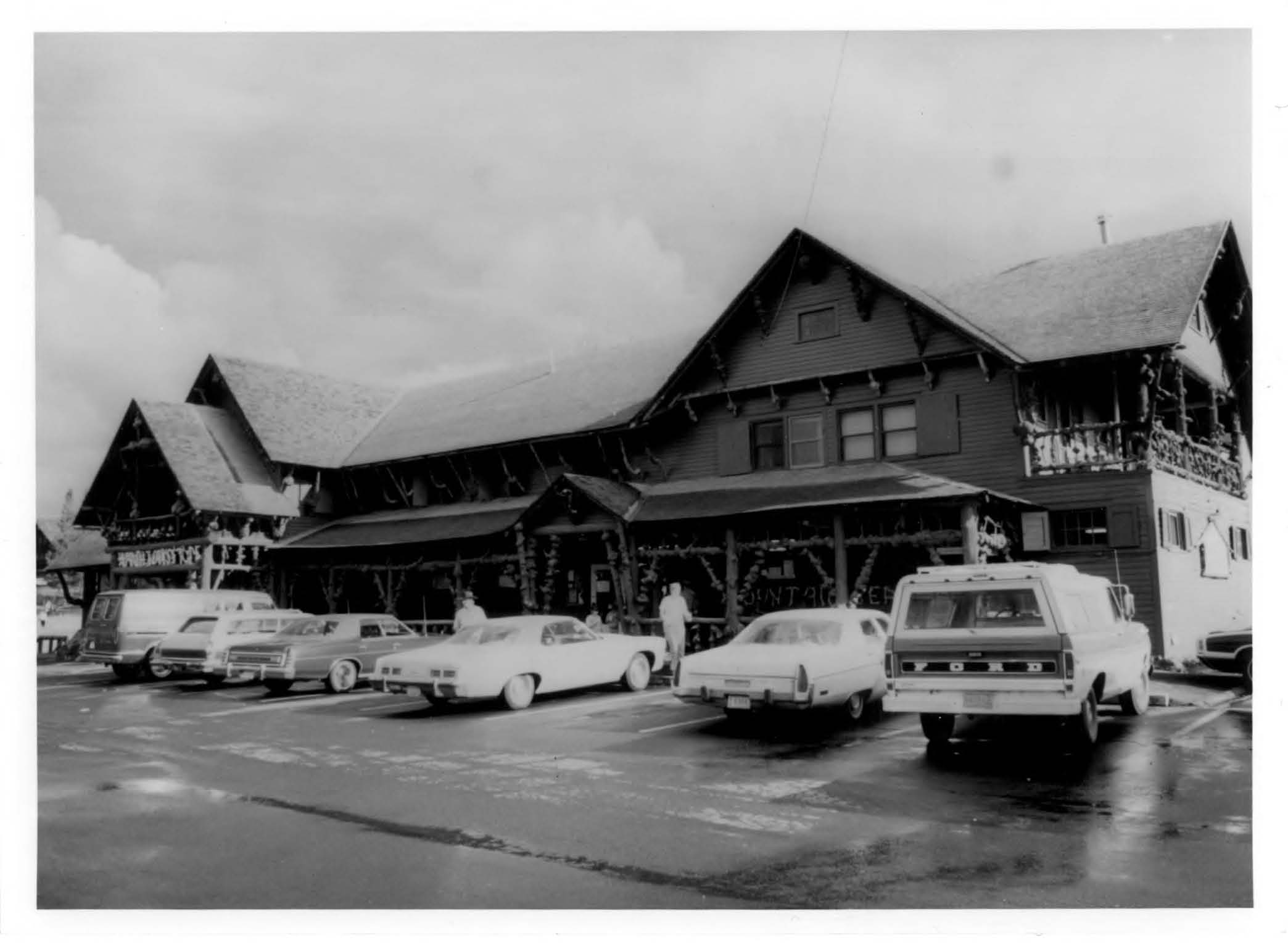
Building #2303, Lower Hamilton Store

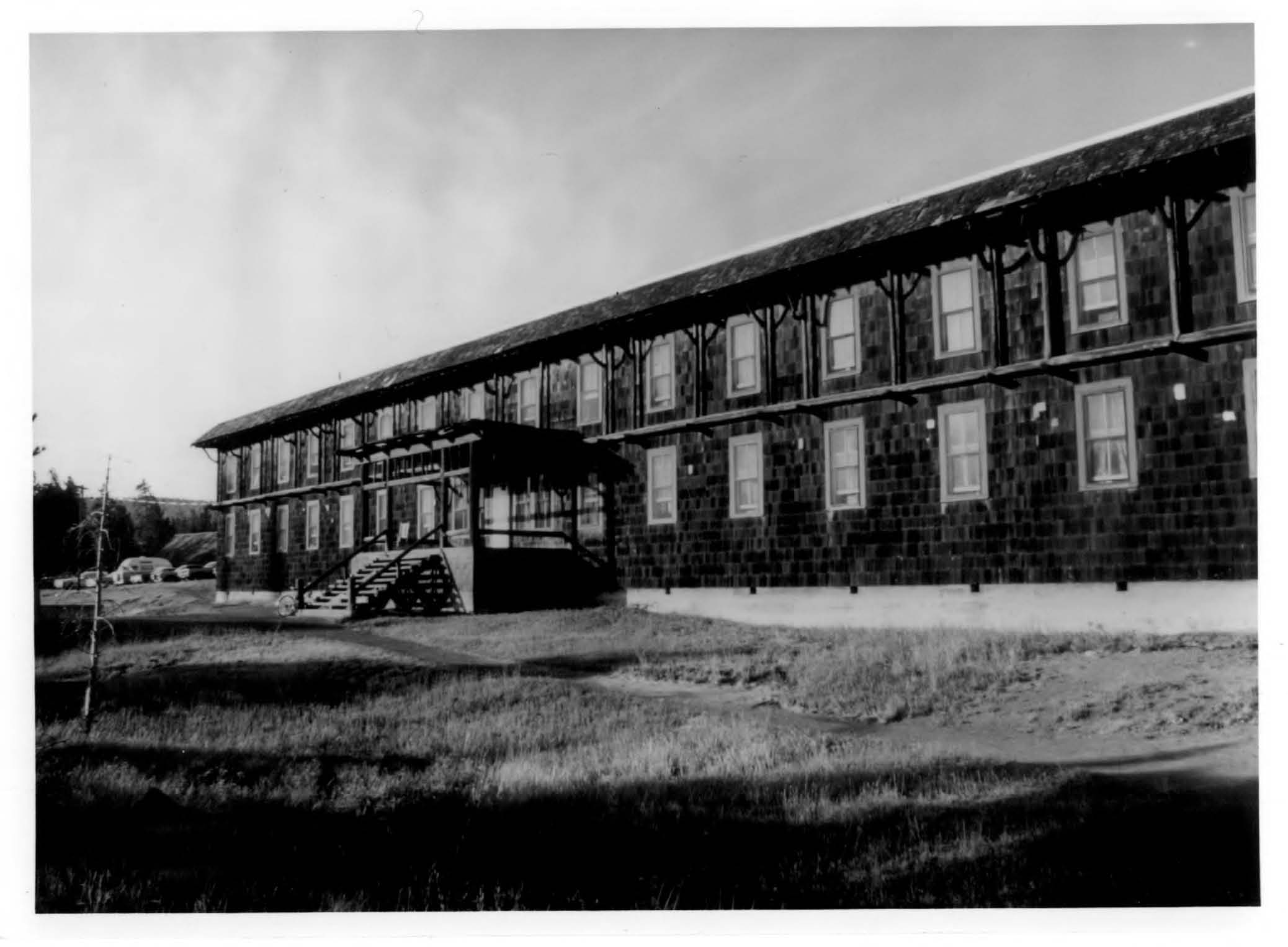
Building #2312, Girl's Dormitory

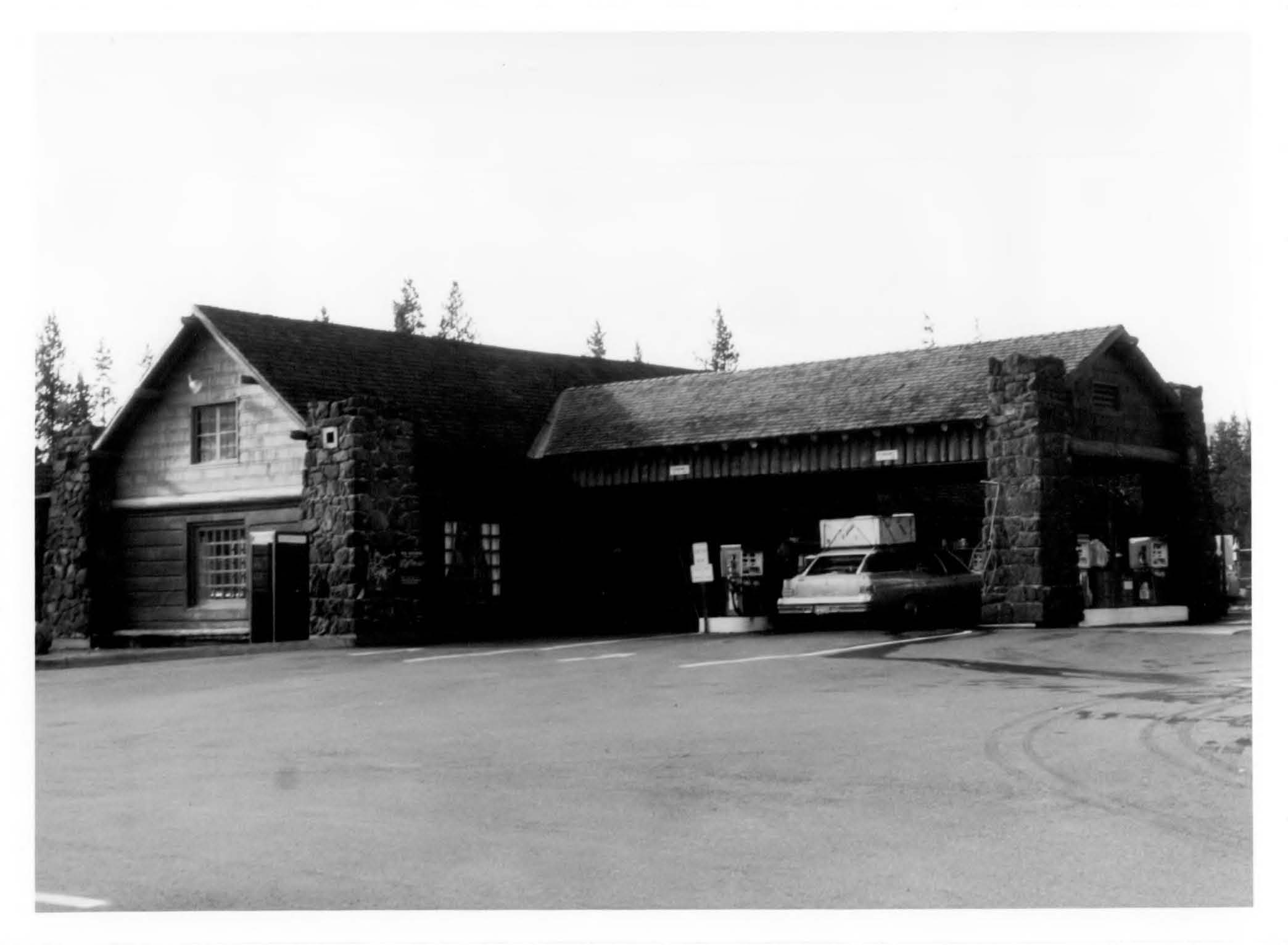
Building #2327, Upper Hamilton Gas Station
"Photos accompanying application for Historic District Status - Old Faithful Historic District". National Park Service. November 2, 1982.
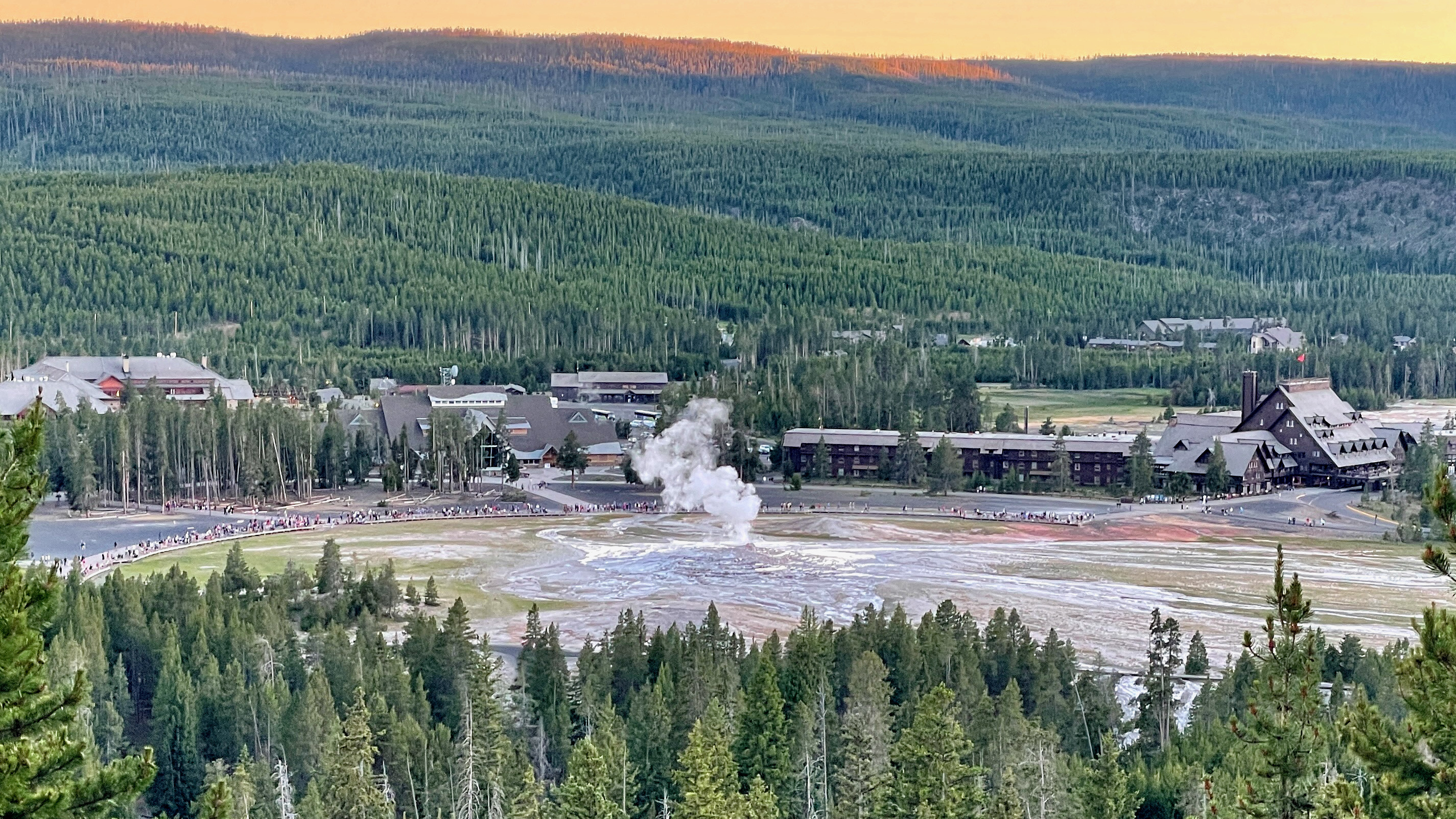
Overview of the district from Observation Point

== See also ==
- Fort Yellowstone
- Grand Loop Road Historic District
- Lake Fish Hatchery Historic District
- Mammoth Hot Springs Historic District
- North Entrance Road Historic District
- Roosevelt Lodge Historic District
