= Yellowstone Main Post Office =

Historic post office in Mammoth, Wyoming, United States

- US Post Office--Yellowstone Main
- U.S. National Register of Historic Places
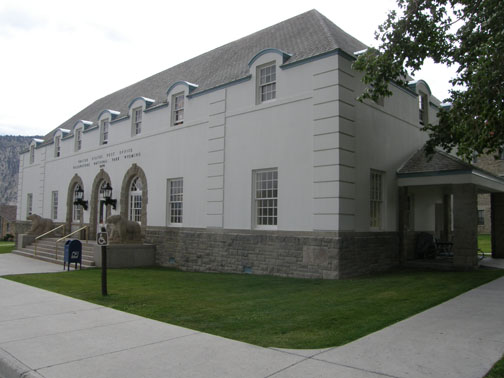
- Post office in August 2008

- Location within Wyoming Location within the United States
- Location: Mammoth, Yellowstone National Park, Wyoming
- Coordinates: 44°58′37″N 110°41′56″W
- Built: 1936
- Architect: US Department of the Treasury; Louis A. Simon
- Architectural style: Renaissance Revival/Moderne
- MPS: Historic US Post Offices in Wyoming, 1900--1941, TR
- NRHP reference No.: 87000789
- Added to NRHP: May 19, 1987

The Yellowstone Main Post Office is a historic post office in Yellowstone National Park in Mammoth, Wyoming, United States, that is listed on the National Register of Historic Places (NRHP).

== Description ==
The Yellowstone facility is an understated classical structure with a low hipped roof and rounded dormers that uses a plan and a basic design vocabulary similar to that used in other post offices in the program. However it also includes restrained French Renaissance Revival elements, the only post office in the western United States to merge these two styles. It is somewhat at odds with the prevailing design theme expressed in other buildings in the former Fort Yellowstone district. The Yellowstone Main Post Office is also a contributing property to the Mammoth Hot Springs Historic District.

== History ==
The post office was built in Mammoth Hot Springs as part of a facilities improvement program by the United States Post Office Department (USPOD). It was nominated to the (NRHP) as part of a thematic study comprising twelve Wyoming post offices built to standardized USPOD plans in the early twentieth century.

== See also ==
- National Register of Historic Places listings in Yellowstone National Park
- National Register of Historic Places listings in Park County, Wyoming
- List of National Historic Landmarks in Wyoming
