= Lake Fish Hatchery Historic District =

Historic district in Wyoming, United States

- U.S. National Register of Historic Places
- U.S. Historic district
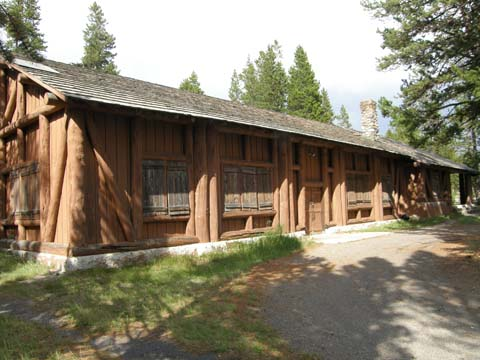

- Location within Wyoming Location within the United States
- Location: Yellowstone Lake, Wyoming
- Coordinates: 44°32′58″N 110°24′13″W
- Built: 1930
- Architect: U.S. Fish and Wildlife Service
- MPS: Yellowstone National Park MPS
- NRHP reference No.: 85001416
- Added to NRHP: June 25, 1985

The Lake Fish Hatchery Historic District comprises nine buildings built between 1930 and 1932 by the U.S. Fish and Wildlife Service in the National Park Service Rustic style. The buildings exhibit a consistency of style and construction, with exposed gable trusses and oversized paired logs at the corners, all with brown paint. The district is located on the shore of Yellowstone Lake near the Lake Hotel The hatchery was established to provide Yellowstone cutthroat trout eggs for state and federal hatcheries outside Yellowstone.

== History ==
By the early 20th century, a number of hatcheries were established in the park by the U.S. Bureau of Fisheries including hatcheries at Yellowstone Lake and Soda Butte Creek. The current Lake Fish Hatchery replaced an earlier hatchery at Lake. These hatcheries not only produced stocks for the park, but also took advantage of the great spawning stock of Yellowstone cutthroat trout to supply eggs to hatcheries around the U.S. Between 1901 and 1953, 818 million trout eggs were exported from the park to hatcheries throughout the U.S.

The hatcheries and stocking operations had both positive and negative impacts on the quality of angling in Yellowstone National Park in the first half of the 20th century. Many native populations were displaced by non-natives, but there was quality brown and rainbow trout fishing in the Firehole, Madison and Gibbon Rivers. Ultimately stocking and hatchery operations negatively impacted Yellowstone cutthroat, westslope cutthroat trout and Arctic grayling populations in the park. In 1953 the National Park Service began closing the hatcheries and stopping stocking operations. The last fish stocked for the benefit of anglers was in 1955 after some 310 million fish had been released in park waters since 1889. The last hatchery was closed in 1957.

== Description ==
The chief building of the district is Building 725, the South District Office for the park and the former Fish and Wildlife Service messhall. The 1,588-square-foot (147.5 m^{2}) building was built in 1935 using a "logs out" technique of construction, in which the log frame is exposed on the outside and the sheathing is set in, giving the interior a smooth wall finish.

Building 726 was the hatchery itself, built in a similar style about 1930 and transferred to the Park Service in 1959. The one story building encloses about 3,464 square feet (321.8 m^{2}). An arched log truss is a prominent feature of the end elevation, together with a rubblestone chimney. The hatchery building was designed to accommodate park visitors, with an aquarium space with glazed panels to allow visitors to view the fish at tank level, and a balcony above the hatching troughs.

Building 729 was an office and summer residence for the Fish and Wildlife Service's hatchery director. Built in 1932, the 2,173-square-foot (201.9 m^{2}) one story building matches its neighbors, in an L-shaped plan. Buildings 730 and 731 are smaller residences, built about 1931. Building 732, a garage, was built in 1930 with six bays. Building 733 was a FWS bunkhouse, built in 1930 with about 2,295 square feet (213.2 m^{2}). Building 735, a wash house, and 737, an oil house, complete the ensemble.

Other facilities built at about the same time included boathouses, a dock, and rearing ponds, which have not survived.

The district was originally under the jurisdiction of the U.S. Fish and Wildlife Service, but with the cessation of hatchery operations, it is now owned by the National Park Service. The hatchery messhall became the office for the southern district of the park. The former bunkhouse also became Park Service offices. The Lake Hatchery was listed on the National Register of Historic Places on June 25, 1985

Lake Fish Hatchery buildings
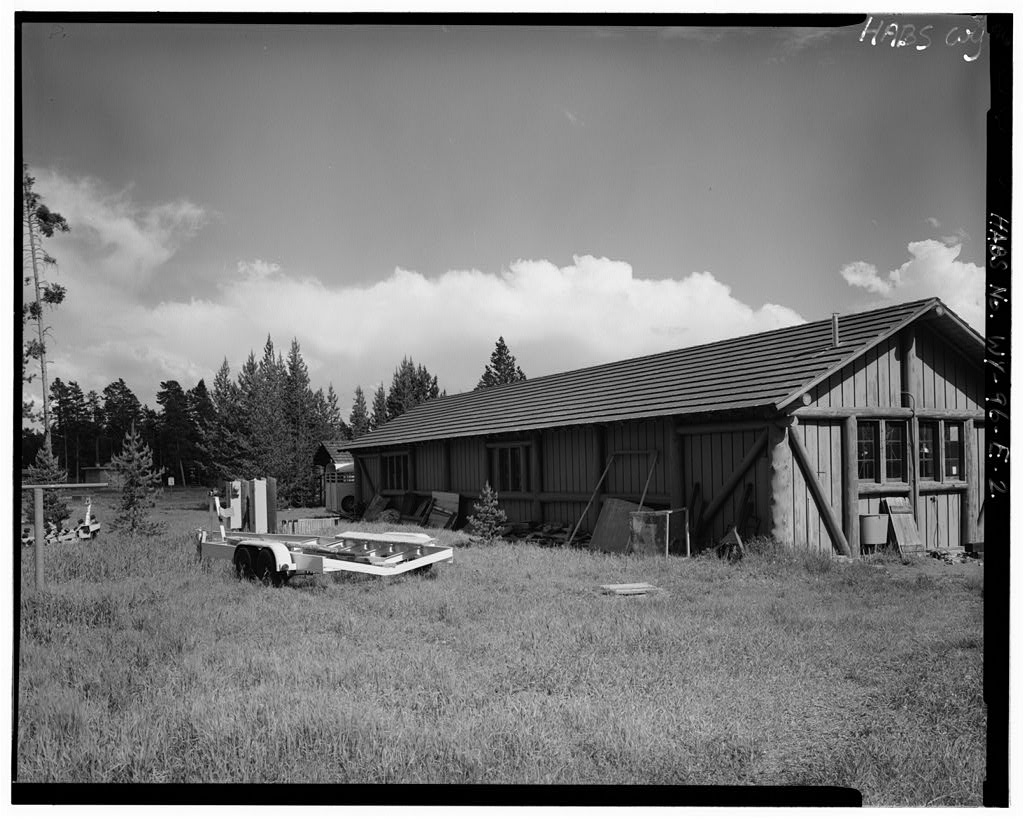

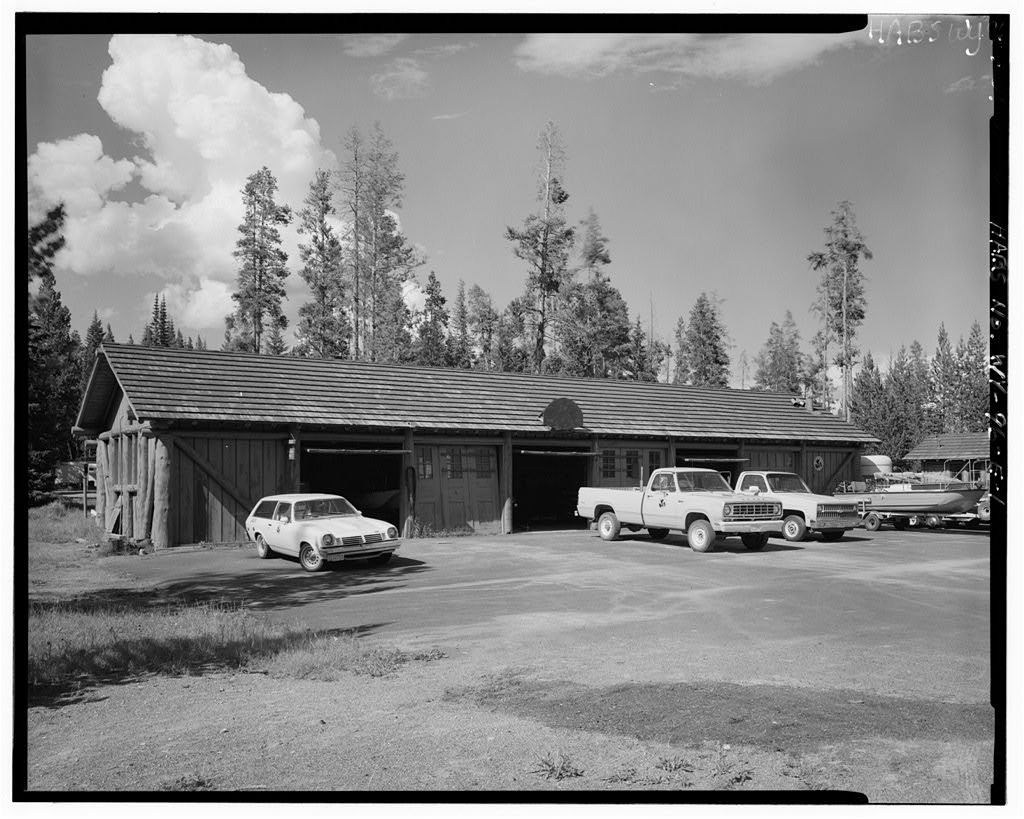

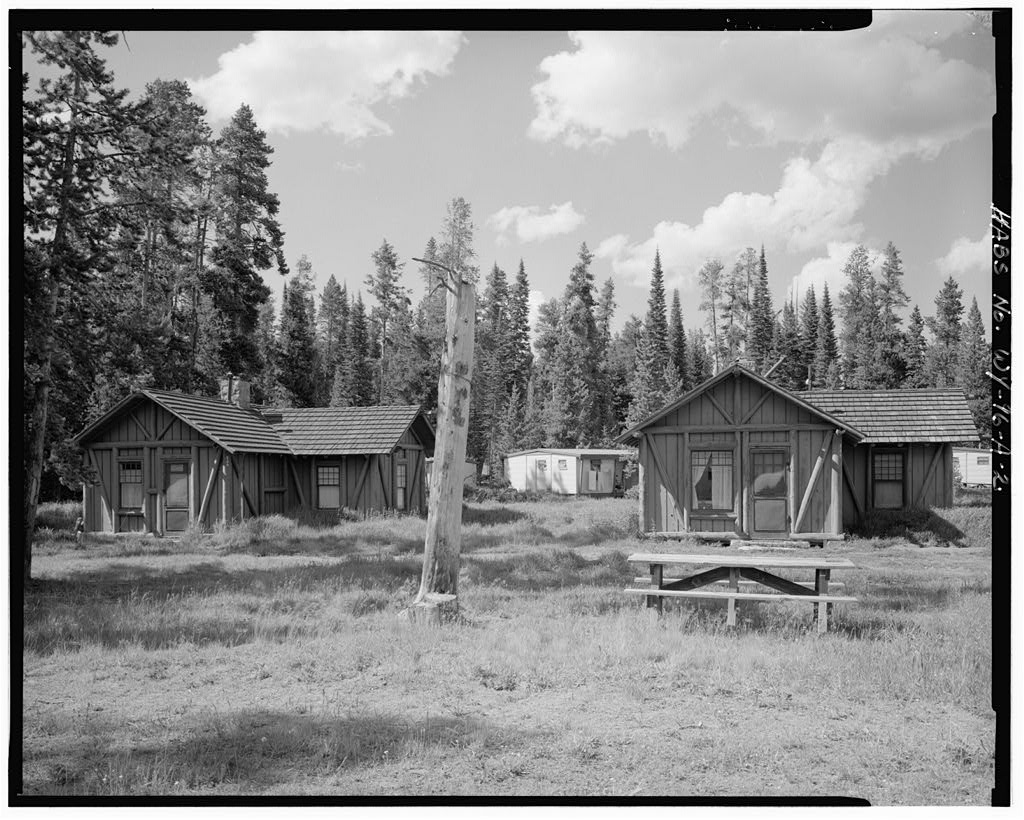

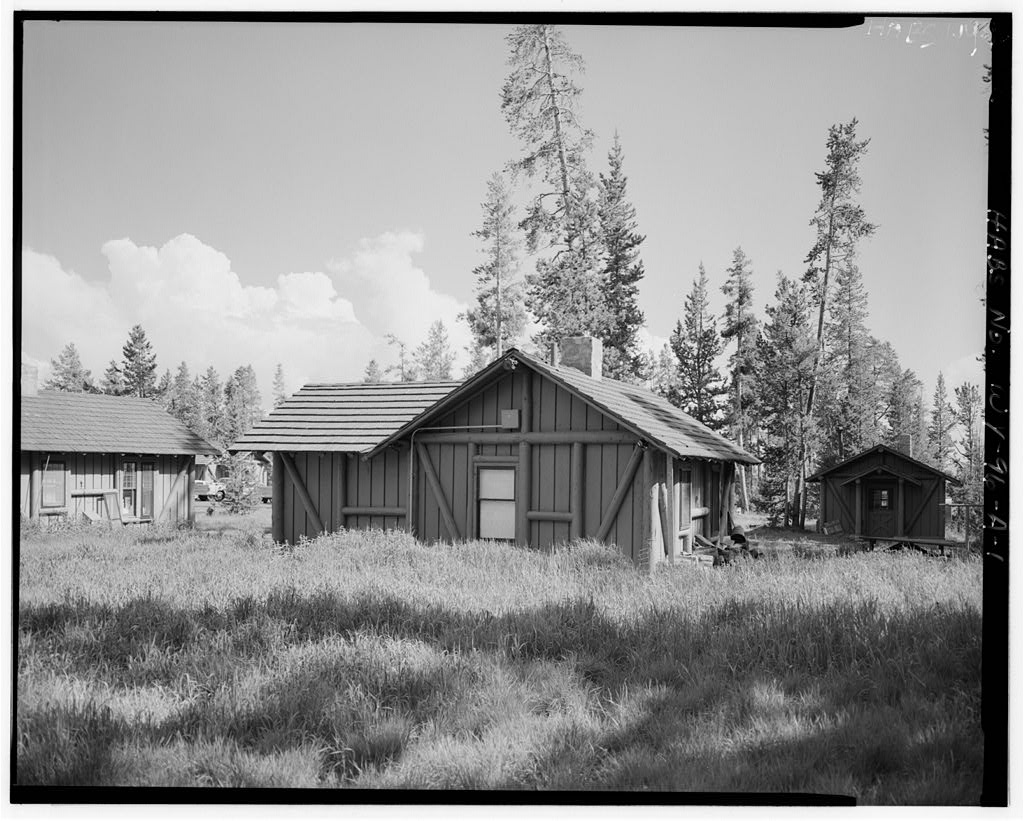

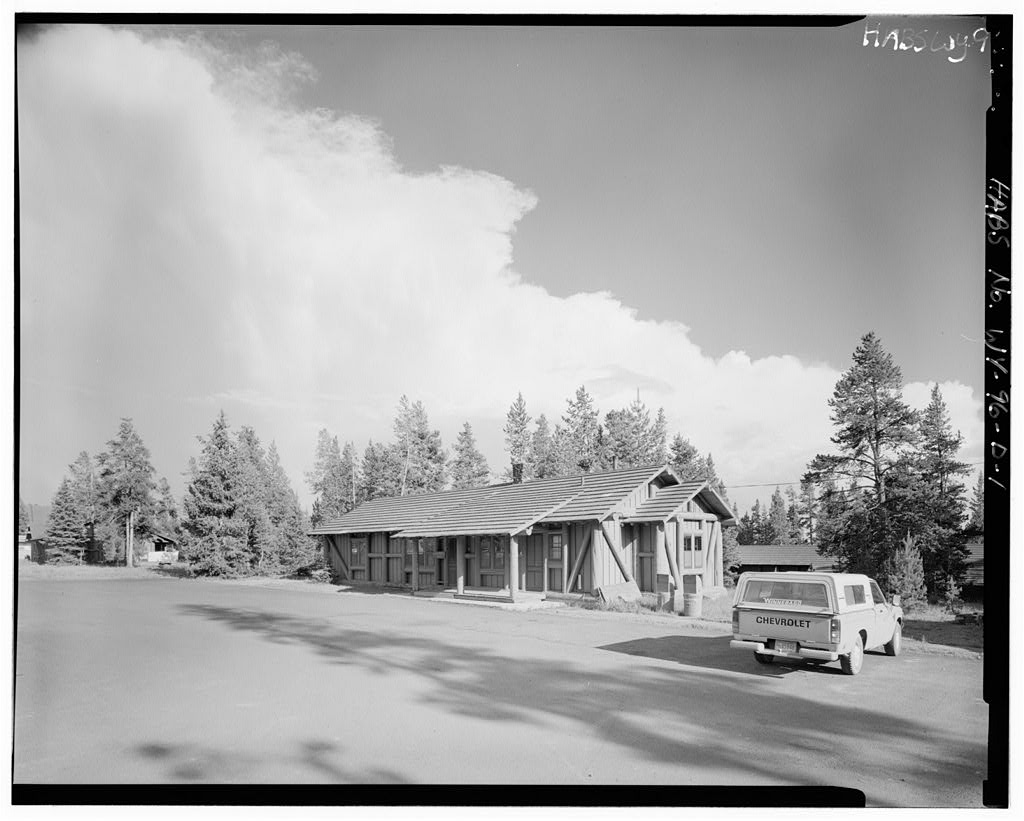

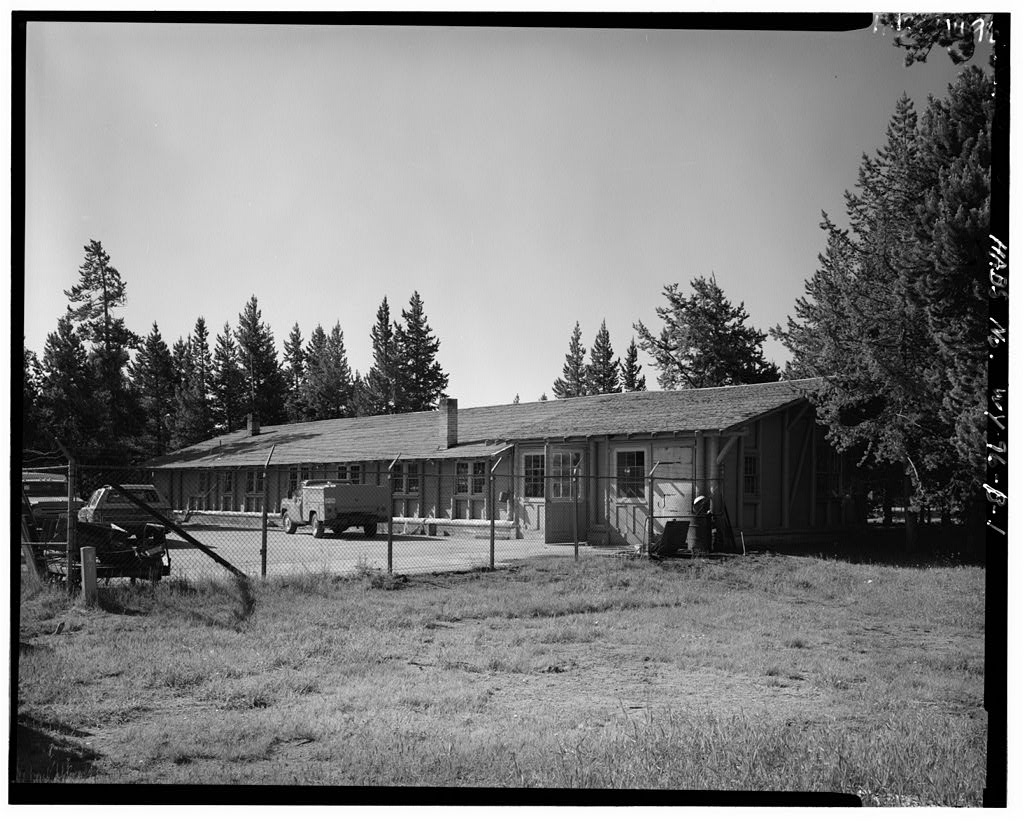

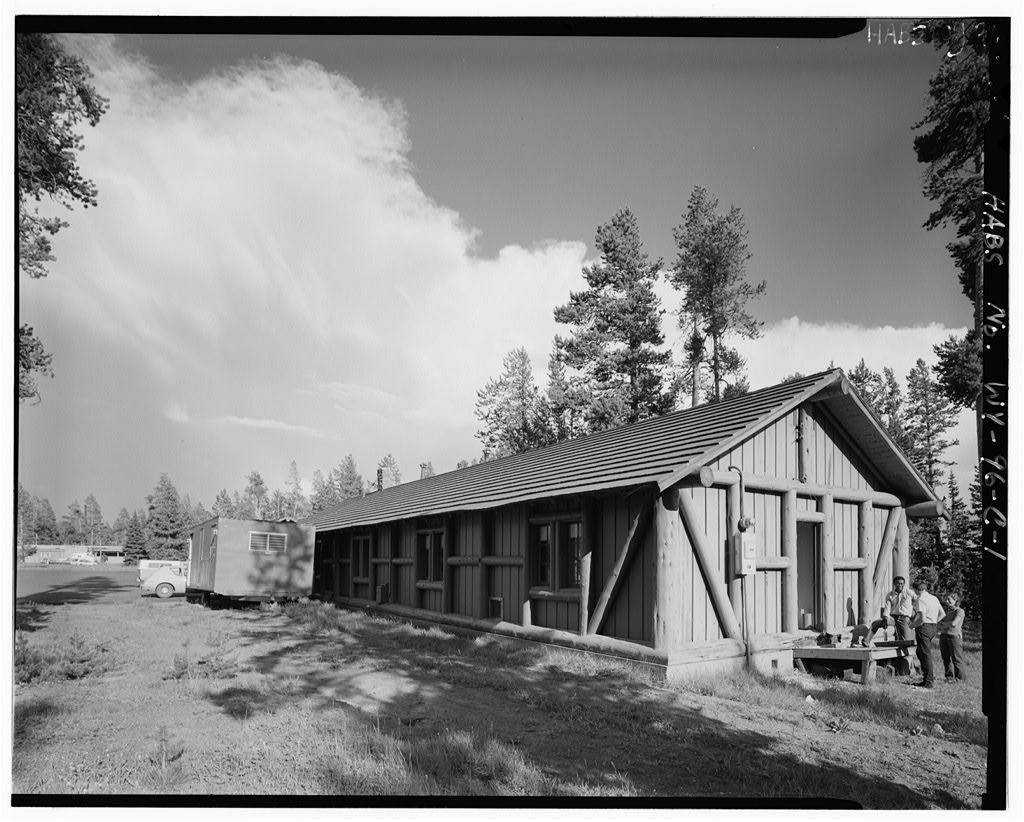

== See also ==
- Fort Yellowstone
- Grand Loop Road Historic District
- Mammoth Hot Springs Historic District
- North Entrance Road Historic District
- Roosevelt Lodge Historic District
- Old Faithful Historic District
