= Roosevelt Arch =

Arched gate at the north entrance to Yellowstone National Park

Coordinates: 45°1′46.1″N 110°42′31.2″W

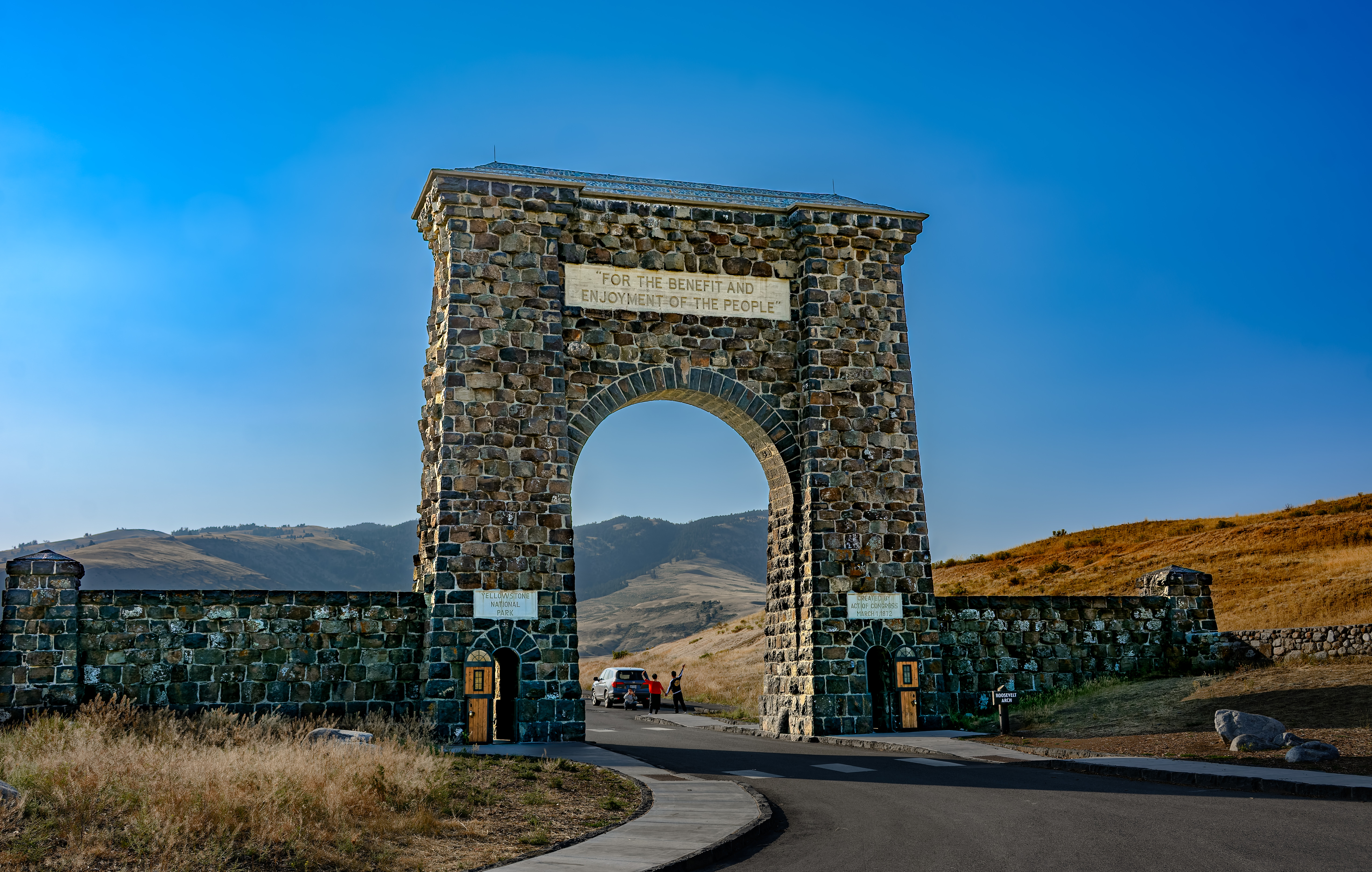
Roosevelt Arch.

The Roosevelt Arch is a rusticated gate at the north entrance to Yellowstone National Park in Gardiner, Montana, United States. Constructed under the supervision of the US Army at Fort Yellowstone, its cornerstone was laid down by President Theodore Roosevelt in 1903. The top of the arch is inscribed with a quote from the Organic Act of 1872, the legislation which created Yellowstone, which reads: "For the Benefit and Enjoyment of the People".

The idea of the arch is attributed to Hiram Martin Chittenden, who felt that the area surrounding Gardiner was not sufficiently impressive and required an emphatic statement of arrival at the famous park. Before 1903, trains brought visitors to Cinnabar, Montana, which was a few miles northwest of Gardiner, Montana, where people would transfer onto horse-drawn coaches to enter the park. In 1903, the Northern Pacific Railway finally completed its branch line to Gardiner. With the development of the Gardiner train station, the arch was proposed as part of the station ensemble.

== Construction ==
The design of the Roosevelt Arch has been attributed to architect Robert Reamer, who designed the train depot, but documentation is inconclusive. Construction of the arch began on February 19, 1903, and was completed on August 15, 1903, at a cost of around US$10,000 (equivalent to about $358,000 in 2025). The archway was built at the north entrance, which was the first major entrance for Yellowstone and remains the only one of the park's five entrances to remain open year-round. President Roosevelt was visiting Yellowstone during construction and was asked to place the cornerstone for the arch, which then took his name. The cornerstone that Roosevelt laid on April 24, 1903 covered a time capsule that contains a Bible, a picture of Roosevelt, local newspapers, and other items. Several thousand people came to Gardiner for the dedication, including John F. Yancey, who subsequently caught a chill and died in Gardiner as a result.

== Description ==
The arch is constructed of hexagonal blocks of columnar basalt, quarried locally. The arch is 52 feet (16 m) high. Two towers or buttresses flank the main archway, pierced by pedestrian passages with heavy wood doors. The arch is flanked by curved walls of the same basalt stone, 12 feet (3.7 m) high, ending in short towers. The quote from the Organic Act is set above the arch in a rectangular slab of concrete. Similar panels flank the arch above the pedestrian doors, with "Yellowstone National Park" on the left and "Created by Act of Congress, March 1, 1872" on the right. Original ambitions for the design included a lake and waterfall, which could not be practically constructed in the semi-arid region and were never pursued. Instead, a small pond was built a little way in front of the arch, with unusual landscaping including sequoias from California. The pond and trees eventually disappeared. The north entrance station was located just past the arch from 1921 until it was relocated a substantial distance to the south in 1961.

The arch is listed as a contributing structure to the North Entrance Road Historic District, and was placed on the National Register of Historic Places as part of the district in 2002.

While motorists and pedestrians can visit the arch and travel under it, the main entrance route to Yellowstone directs through traffic to a route that bypasses the arch about 400 feet away. The change was made in a 2011 construction project, in response to traffic and pedestrian jams at the arch, whose opening is too small to accommodate two full lanes of traffic.

== Notes ==
- "Mammoth Area Historic Highlights". National Park Service. Archived from the original on March 7, 2007.

== See also ==
- National Park Service
- Rustic architecture
