= Grand Loop Road =

- U.S. National Register of Historic Places
- U.S. Historic district
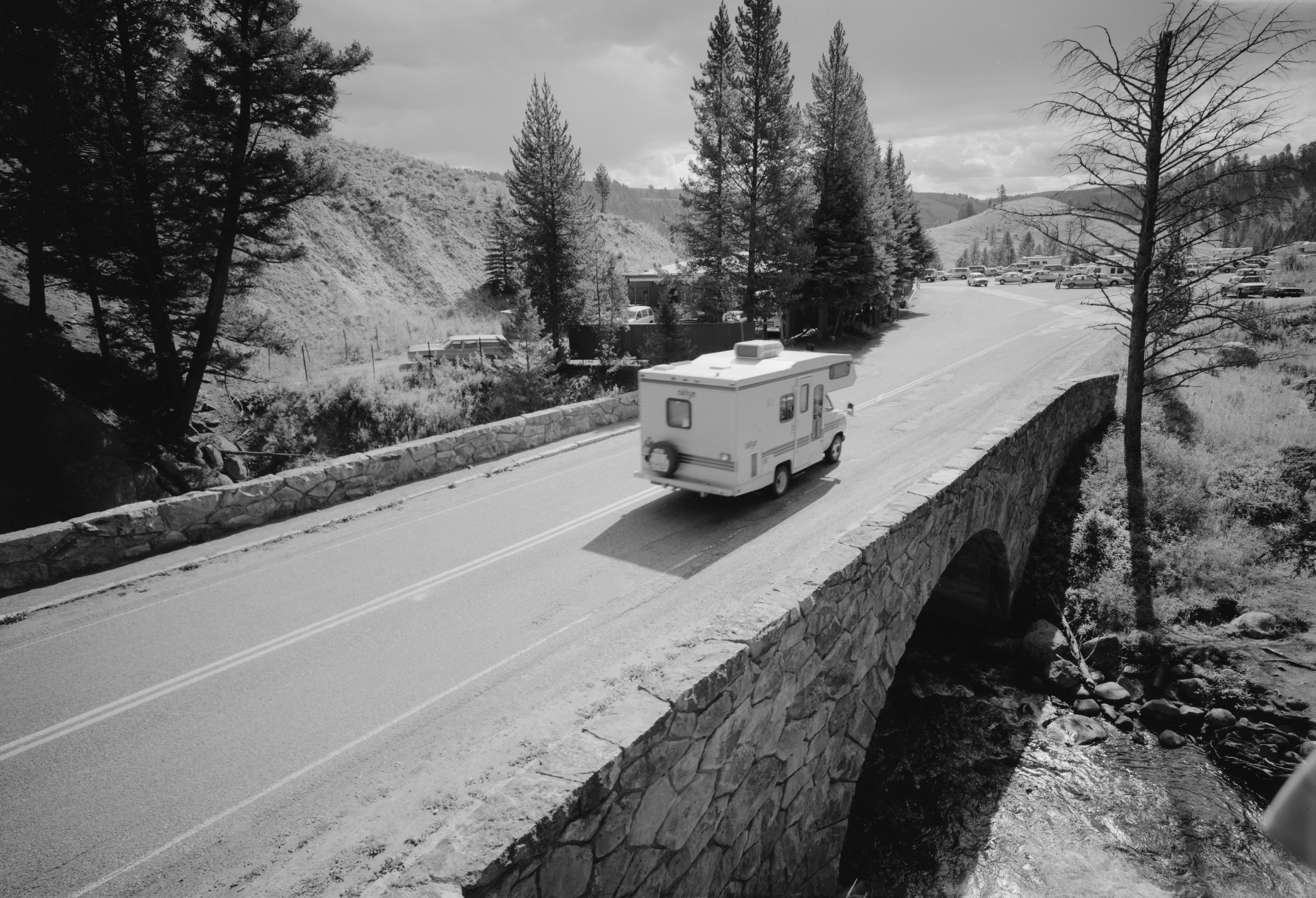

- Location within Wyoming Location within the United States
- Location: Yellowstone National Park, Wyoming
- Coordinates: 44°38′16″N 110°36′54″W
- Architect: U.S. Army Corps of Engineers; National Park Service
- NRHP reference No.: 03001345
- Added to NRHP: December 23, 2003

The Grand Loop Road is a historic district which encompasses the primary road system in Yellowstone National Park. Much of the 140-mile (230 km) system was originally planned by Captain Hiram M. Chittenden of the US Army Corps of Engineers in the early days of the park, when it was under military administration. The Grand Loop Road provides access to the major features of the park, including the Upper, Midway and Lower geyser basins, Mammoth Hot Springs, Tower Fall, the Grand Canyon of the Yellowstone and Yellowstone Lake.

A number of other historic districts adjoin the Grand Loop in Yellowstone, including Mammoth Hot Springs, North Entrance Road, Roosevelt Lodge, Lake Fish Hatchery and Old Faithful historic districts.

Grand Loop Rd. includes unsigned portions of US 20, US 89, US 191 and US 287, all of which traverse the park. The road was named by Harry W. Frantz in 1923, who served as the park's publicist before beginning a long career as a journalist.

== Route ==
Beginning at the junction of the North Entrance Road and Grand Loop Rd. at Yellowstone National Park headquarters at Fort Yellowstone near Mammoth Hot Springs 44°58′34″N 110°42′2″W, the road travels south, passing through Golden Gate Canyon on a viaduct and ascending the Gallatin Range, crossing Kingman Pass near Bunsen Peak. From the pass, the road descends into the Gardner River valley. At the south end of the valley, the road passes Sheepeater Cliff, a prominent columnar basalt cliff. After crossing the Gardner River, the road follows Obsidian Creek into Obsidian Canyon, passing Obsidian Cliff about halfway through the canyon. From Obsidian Canyon, the road continues south into the Norris Valley and the Norris Geyser Basin (44°43′38″N 110°41′47″W). Here, the road meets the Gibbon River and follows it into the Gibbon Geyser Basin and Gibbon Canyon. Emerging from the canyon the Gibbon River merges with the Firehole River to form the Madison River. At this point—Madison Junction (44°38′43″N 110°51′29″W), the road junctions with West Entrance Road which follows the Madison River west out of the park and to West Yellowstone, Montana.

Grand Loop Rd. continues to follow the Firehole River south and east. In a relatively short distance, the road travels through the three most notable geyser basins in the park: Lower Geyser Basin, Midway Geyser Basin and Upper Geyser Basin. The Old Faithful Historic District is located on Grand Loop Rd. adjacent to the Upper Geyser Basin. Turning east from Old Faithful the road crosses the Continental Divide over Craig Pass, and descends to the West Thumb Geyser Basin on the shore of Yellowstone Lake. West Thumb (44°24′49″N 110°34′42″W) is the southernmost point on Great Loop Rd. Here the road junctions with South Entrance Road which continues south to Grand Teton National Park.

Grand Loop Rd. continues north along the shore of Yellowstone Lake. Near the northern end of the lake it passes the Lake Hotel and the Lake Fish Hatchery Historic District. Just past the Lake Hotel area (44°34′1″N 110°23′11″W), the East Entrance Road turns right and crosses the Yellowstone River over Fishing Bridge and continues east to Cody, Wyoming. Grand Loop Rd. follows the western side of the Yellowstone River north into the Hayden Valley and past upper Yellowstone Falls near the mouth of the Grand Canyon of the Yellowstone (44°44′9″N 110°29′35″W). The road then crosses Dunraven Pass near Mount Washburn and descends to Tower Fall and Tower Junction (44°54′57″N 110°24′56″W) where it intersects with the Northeast Entrance Road to Cooke City, Montana.

From Tower Junction, the road travels north and then west through the Gallatin Range to complete the loop at Mammoth Hot Springs.

== Major junctions ==
Counterclockwise (CCW) reads down; clockwise (CW) reads up.

County	Location	mi	km	Destinations	Notes
Park	Mammoth Hot Springs	0.0	0.0	US 89 north (North Entrance Road) – Visitor Center, Campground, Gardiner	CW end of US 89 overlap
Park	Stretch of road closed December–April				
Park	Madison Junction	34.3	55.2	US 20 west / US 191 / US 287 north (West Entrance Road) – Campground, West Yellowstone	CW end of US 20/US 191/US 287 overlap; West Entrance Rd. closed December–April
Teton		50.2	80.8	Old Faithful	Interchange
Teton	West Thumb Geyser Basin	67.8	109.1	US 89 / US 191 / US 287 south (South Entrance Road) – Grant Village, Lewis Lake, Grand Teton, Jackson	CCW end of US 89/US 191/US 287 overlap; South Entrance Rd. closed winters
Teton	Stretch of road closed winters				
Teton	Fishing Bridge	88.4	142.3	US 14 / US 16 / US 20 east (East Entrance Road) – Sylvan Pass, Cody	CCW end of US 20 overlap; western terminus of US 14/US 16; East Entrance Rd. closed winters
Stretch of road closed winters
Park	Tower Junction	122.0	196.3	US 212 east (Northeast Entrance Road) – Northeast Entrance, Silver Gate, Cooke City	Western terminus of US 212
Park	Mammoth Hot Springs	140.1	225.5	US 89 north (North Entrance Road) – Visitor Center, Campground, Gardiner	See above
1.000 mi = 1.609 km; 1.000 km = 0.621 mi: Concurrency terminus

== See also ==
- Fort Yellowstone
- Lake Fish Hatchery Historic District
- Mammoth Hot Springs Historic District
- North Entrance Road Historic District
- Roosevelt Lodge Historic District
- Old Faithful Historic District
