= Mammoth Hot Springs Historic District =

United States historic place in Yellowstone National Park

- U.S. National Register of Historic Places
- U.S. Historic district
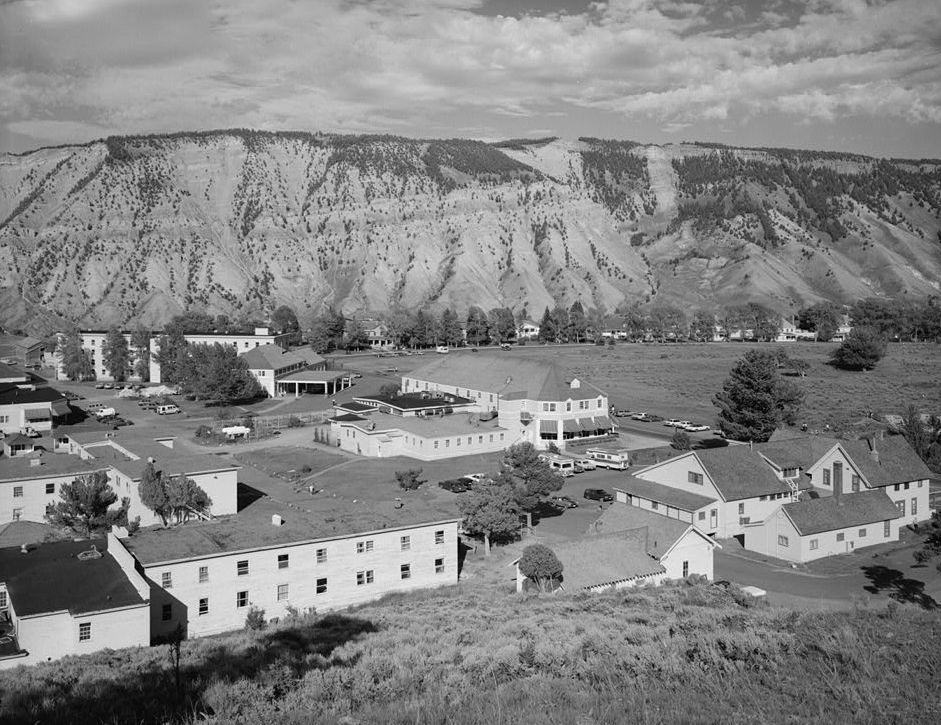

- Location within Wyoming Location within the United States
- Location: Yellowstone National Park, Wyoming
- Coordinates: 44°58′37″N 110°41′52″W
- Area: 158 acres (64 ha)
- Built: 1891
- Architect: U.S. Army Chief Quartermaster Office
- Architectural style: Late 19th and Early 20th Century American Movements
- NRHP reference No.: 02000257
- Added to NRHP: March 20, 2002

The Mammoth Hot Springs Historic District is a 158-acre (64 ha) historic district in Yellowstone National Park comprising the administrative center for the park. It is composed of two major parts: Fort Yellowstone, the military administrative center between 1886 and 1918, and now a National Historic Landmark, and a concessions district which provides food, shopping, services, and lodging for park visitors and employees. It was added to the National Register of Historic Places on March 20, 2002, for its significance in architecture, conservation, entertainment/recreation, and military. The district includes 189 contributing buildings.

== Description ==
Fort Yellowstone is a carefully ordered district of substantial buildings that clearly indicate their military origins. The U.S. Army administered the park from 1886 to 1918 when administration was transferred to National Park Service. The park headquarters is now housed in the original double cavalry barracks (constructed in 1909). The Horace Albright Visitor Center is located in the old bachelors' officers quarters (constructed in 1909).

The concessions district contrasts with the military district, with a less formal arrangement and style and includes the Mammoth Hot Springs Hotel and Dining Room, a gas station, and retail stores. The Yellowstone Main Post Office, itself on the National Register of Historic Places sits just north of Fort Yellowstone. The residential area includes houses designed by architect Robert Reamer.

The district is directly adjacent to the Mammoth Hot Springs thermal area, and is itself built on an ancient travertine terrace. The Grand Loop Road Historic District runs through the Mammoth district, and the North Entrance Road Historic District adjoins just to the north.

== Gallery ==
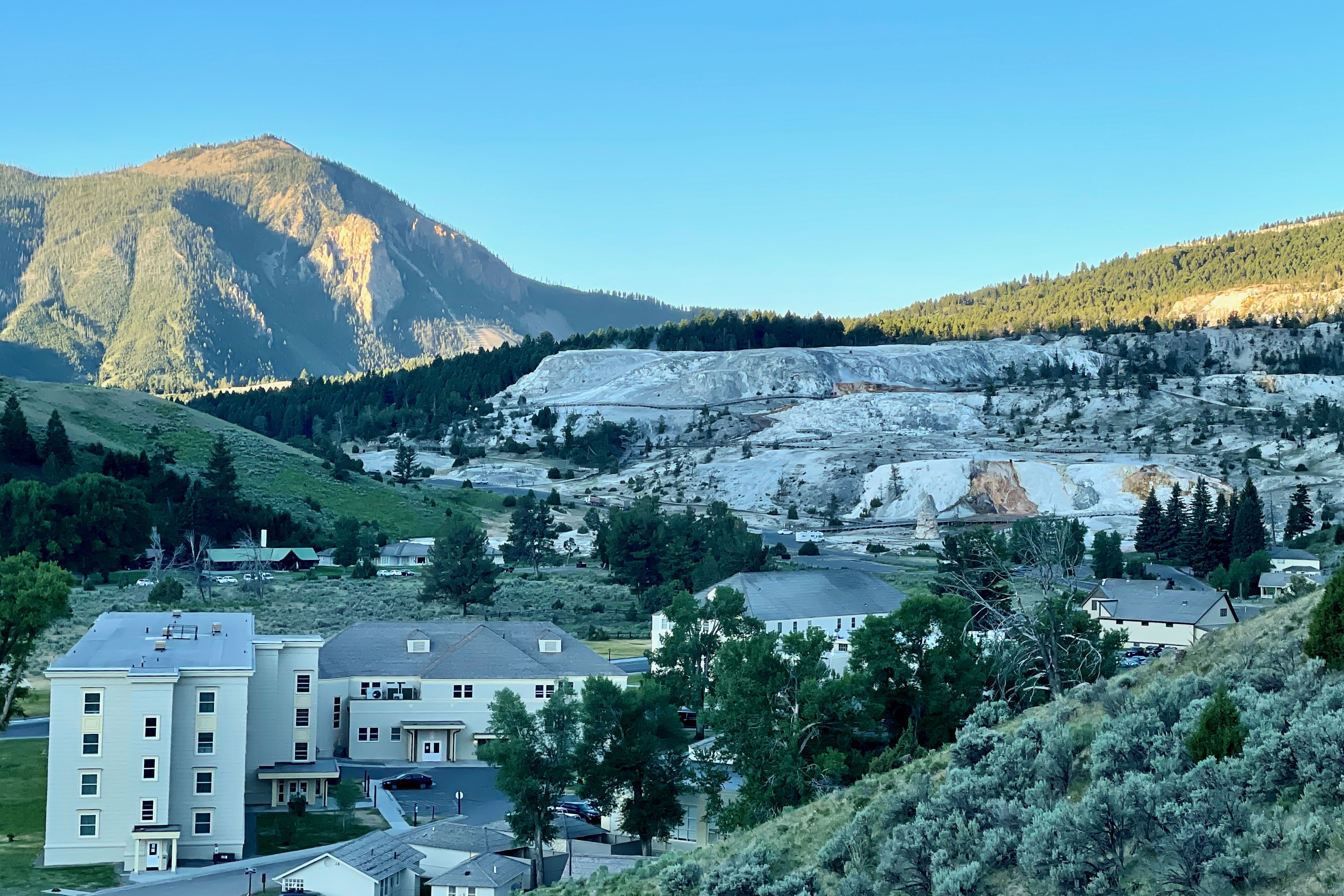
Area view of Mammoth Hot Springs

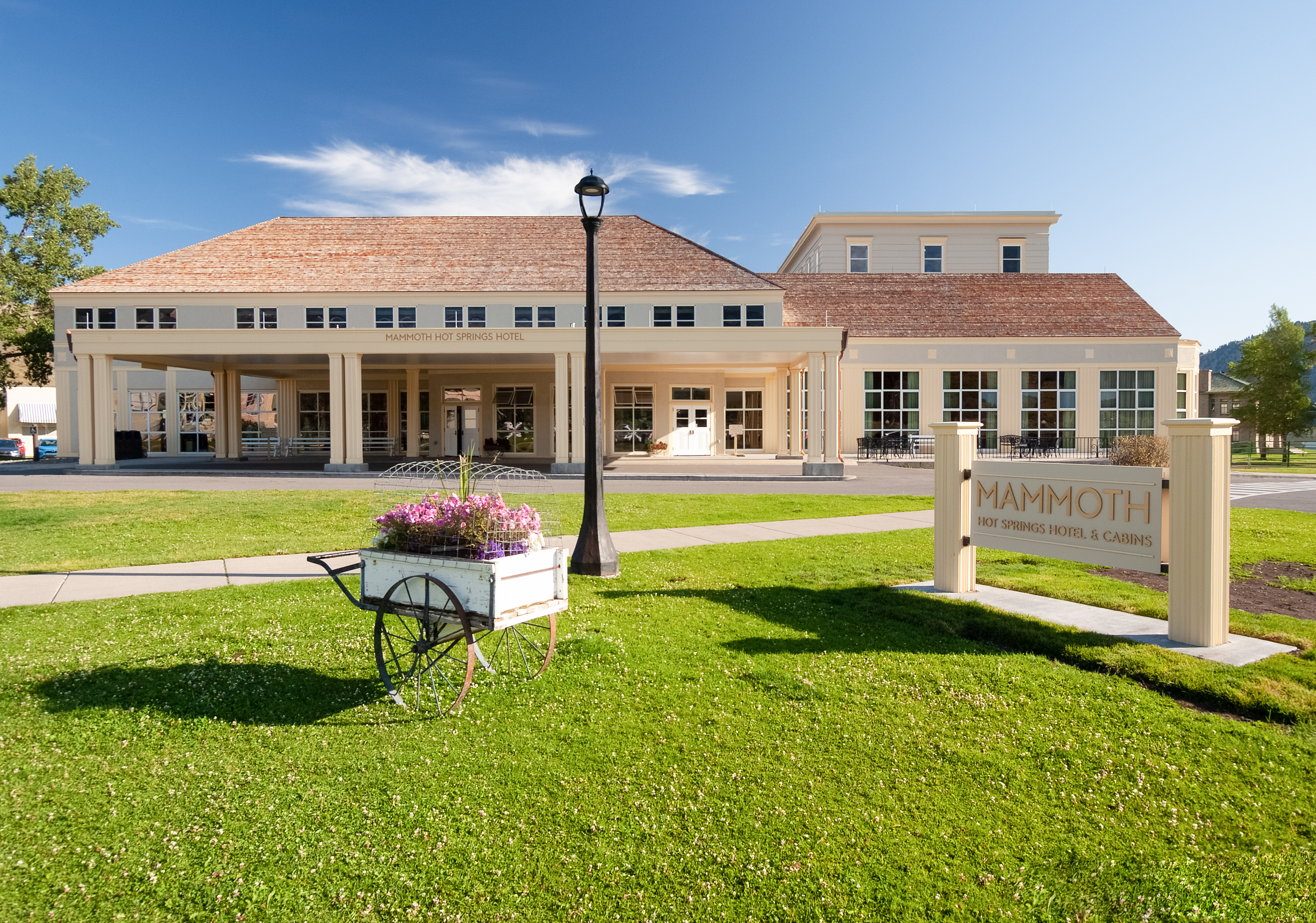
Mammoth Hot Springs Hotel

== See also ==
- Fort Yellowstone
- Grand Loop Road Historic District
- Lake Fish Hatchery Historic District
- North Entrance Road Historic District
- Roosevelt Lodge Historic District
- Old Faithful Historic District
