= North Entrance Road Historic District =

Historic district and road in Wyoming and Montana, U.S.

- U.S. National Register of Historic Places
- U.S. Historic district
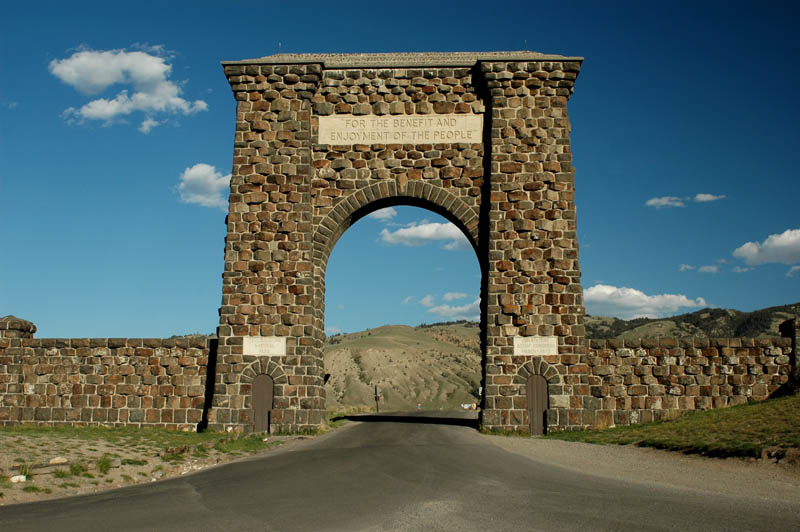
- Roosevelt Arch, October 2006

- Location within Montana Location within the United States
- Nearest city: Yellowstone National Park, Montana and Wyoming
- Coordinates: 45°0′24″N 110°41′58″W
- Built: 1883
- Architect: COE
- MPS: Yellowstone National Park MPS
- NRHP reference No.: 02000529 and 02000530
- Added to NRHP: May 22, 2002

The North Entrance Road Historic District is a historic district and road in Yellowstone National Park in Park County, Wyoming, and Park County, Montana in the United States, that is listed on the National Register of Historic Places (NRHP).

== Description ==
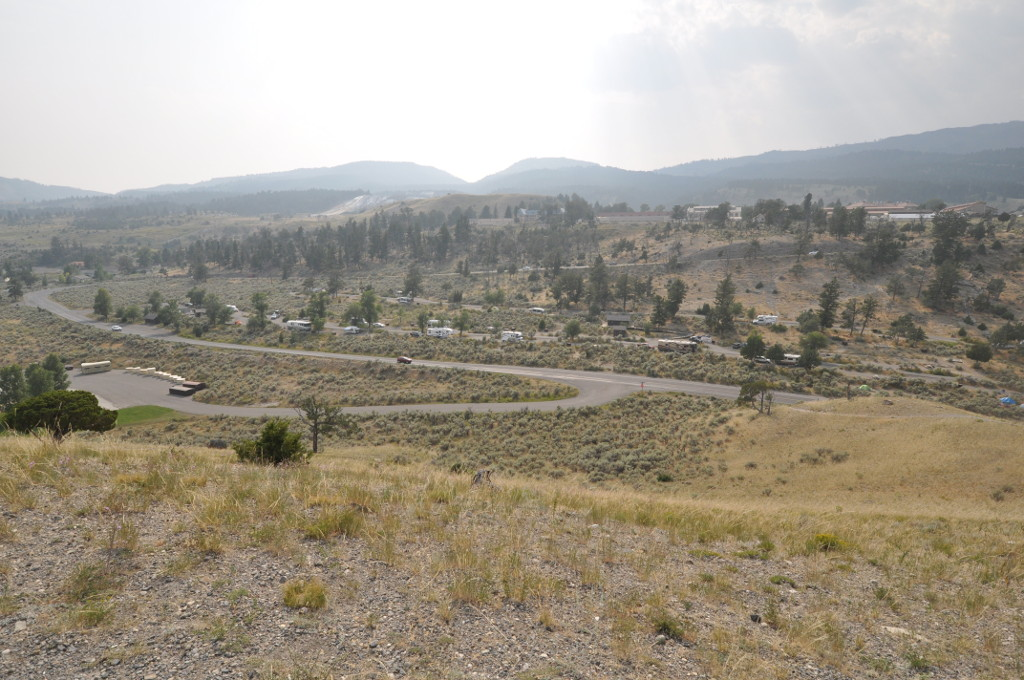
The former North Entrance Road winding around the Mammoth Spring Campground in Mammoth, Wyoming, August 2017

The district comprises Yellowstone National Park's former North Entrance Road from Gardiner, Montana to the park headquarters in Mammoth, Wyoming, a distance of a little over five miles (8.0 km). This original North Entrance Road was the first major road in the park, necessary to join the U.S. Army station at Fort Yellowstone to the Northern Pacific Railroad station at Gardiner. The majority of the road runs along the Gardner River. The road/district includes the Roosevelt Arch at the northern boundary of the park and winds through rolling terrain before crossing the Gardner River (twice) and joining the Grand Loop Road.

== History ==
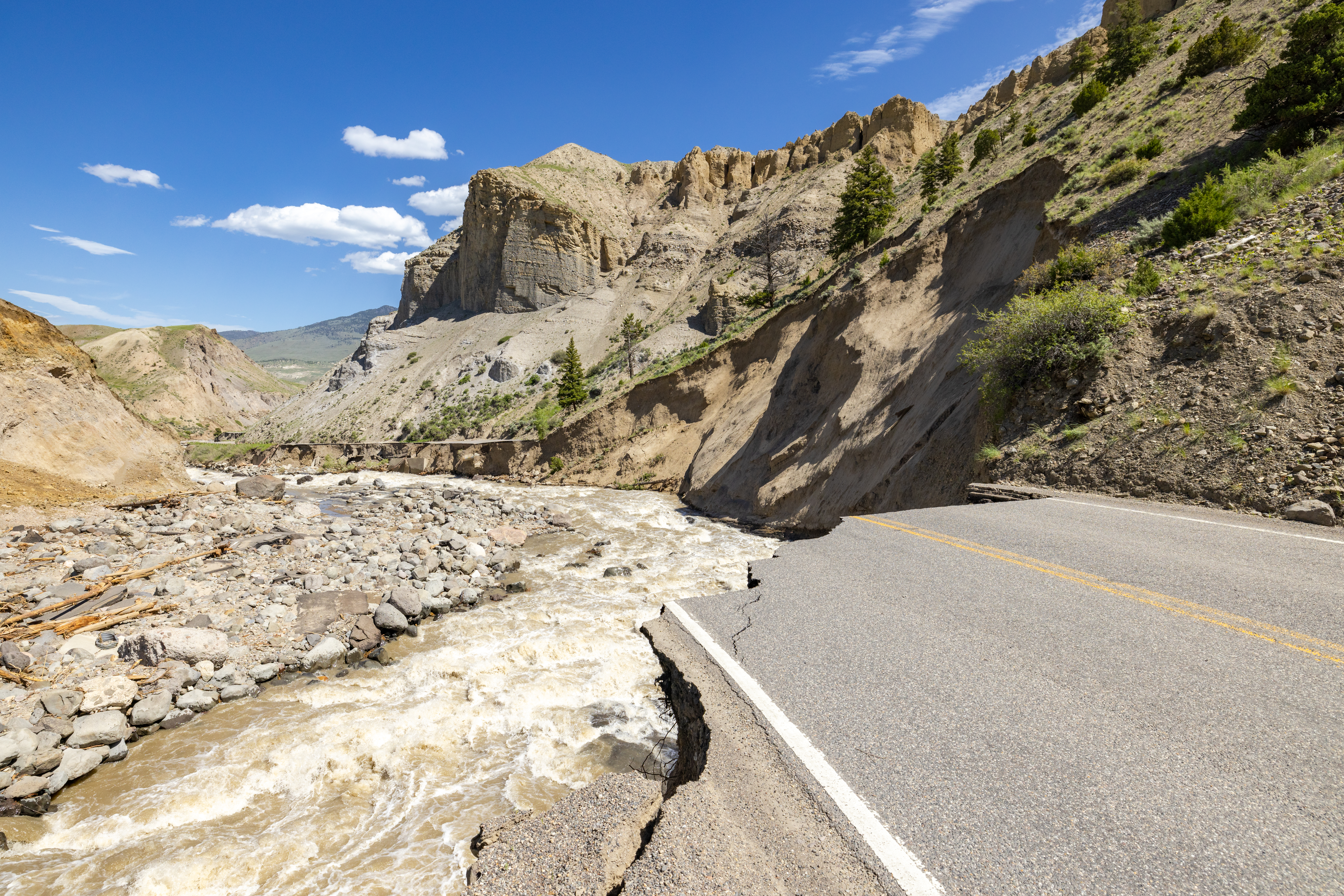
The former North Entrance Road washout along the Gardner River after the June 2022 floods.

The road was planned in 1883 by Lieutenant Dan Kingman of the U.S. Army Corps of Engineers and later on improved by Captain Hiram M. Chittenden of the Corps. It replaced the old Gardiner High Road which went from behind the Mammoth Hotel north over the ridges west of the river to the town of Gardiner. The first permanent entrance station to house rangers checking vehicle entering the park was constructed in 1921. It replaced temporary tents used by rangers at the Roosevelt Arch.

The road was destroyed in the 2022 Montana floods. Most of the road was washed away by the river. On October 30, 2022, Old Gardiner Road was opened to regular visitor traffic between Gardiner and Mammoth Hot Springs, to bypass the damaged former North Entrance Road. Subsequently, the National Park Service designated Old Gardiner Road as the "North Entrance Road". The two North Entrance Roads have a short concurrency at both ends.

== Gallery ==
Images of the North Entrance Road Historic District
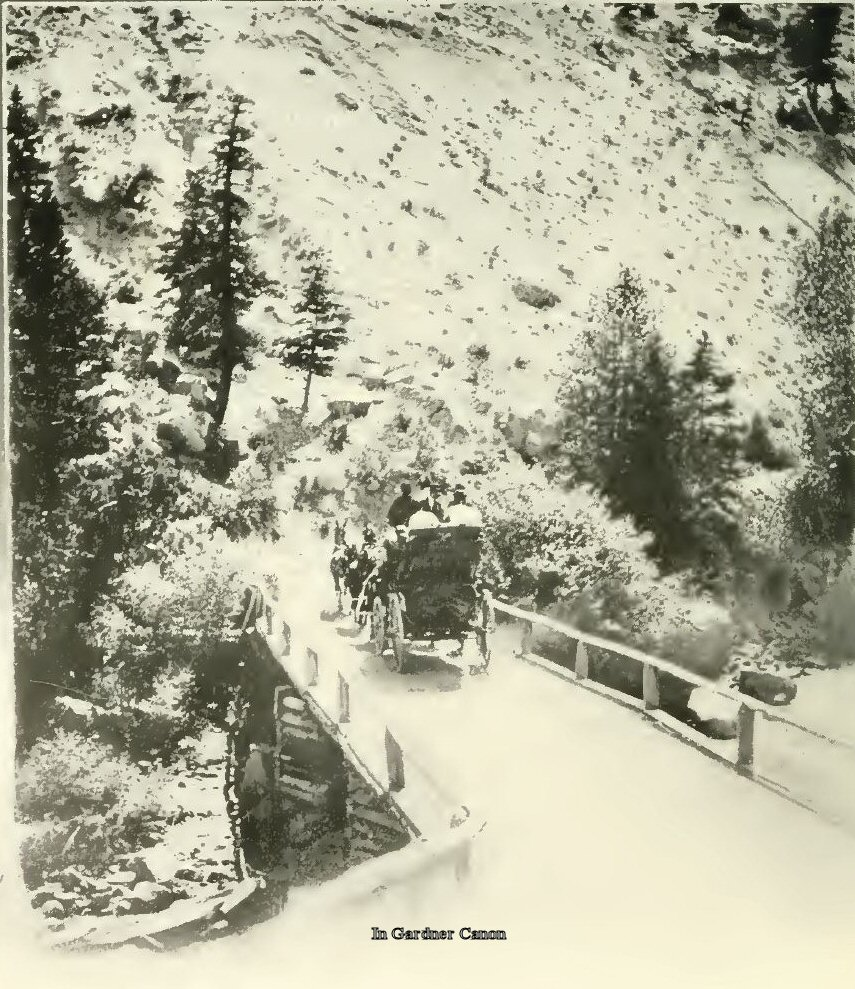
Gardner River Crossing, 1901

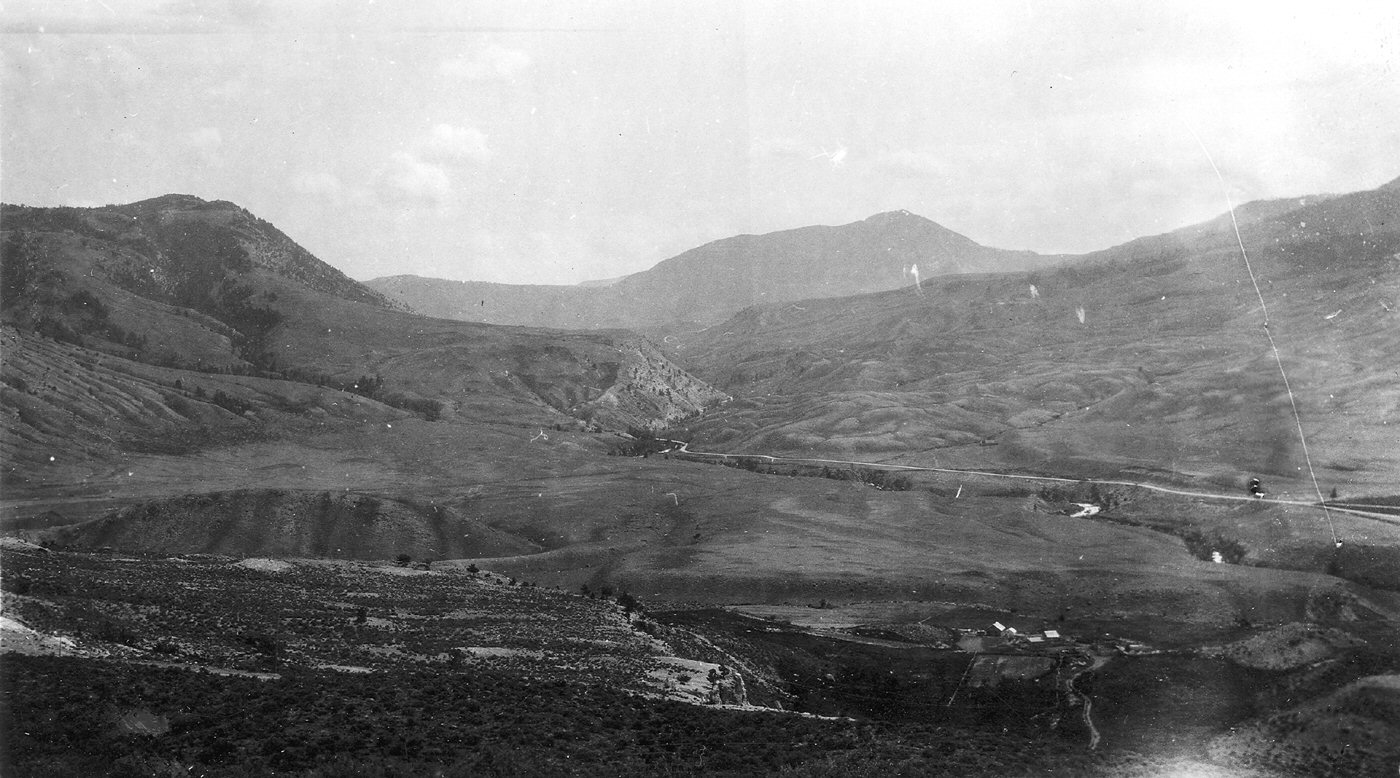
Lower Gardner River, 1923

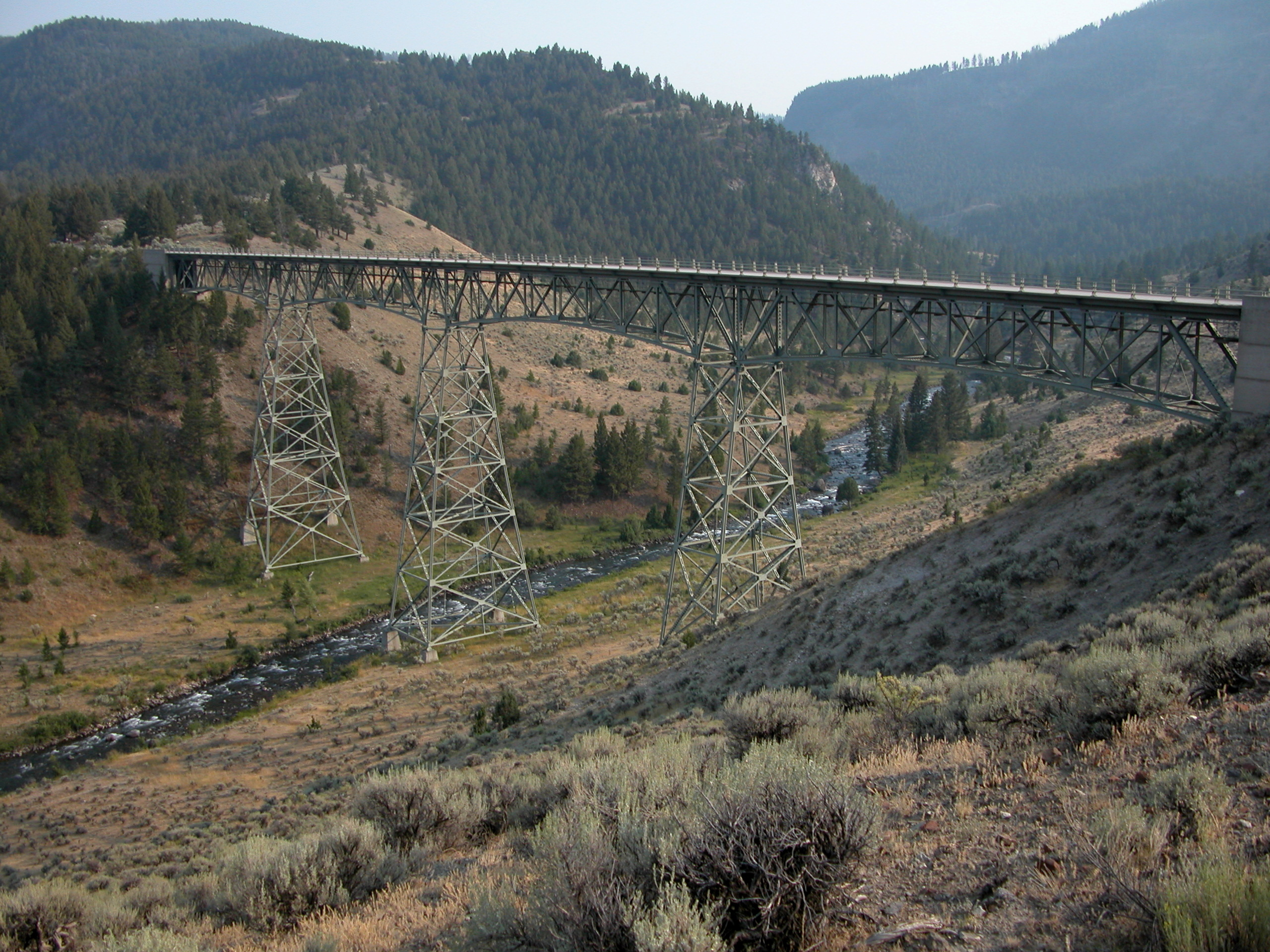
Grand Loop bridge over Gardner River

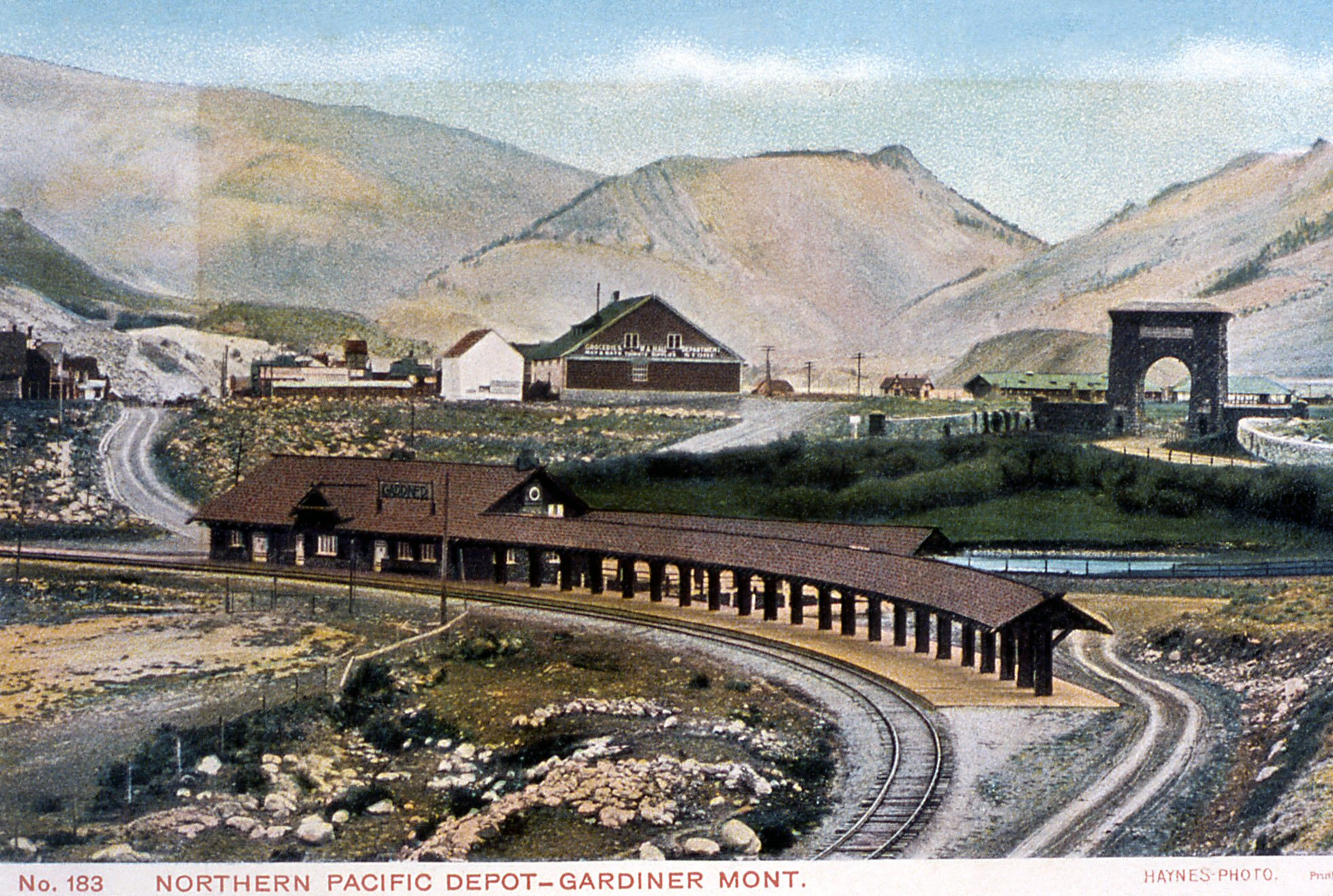
Northern Pacific Railway station at northern end of road.

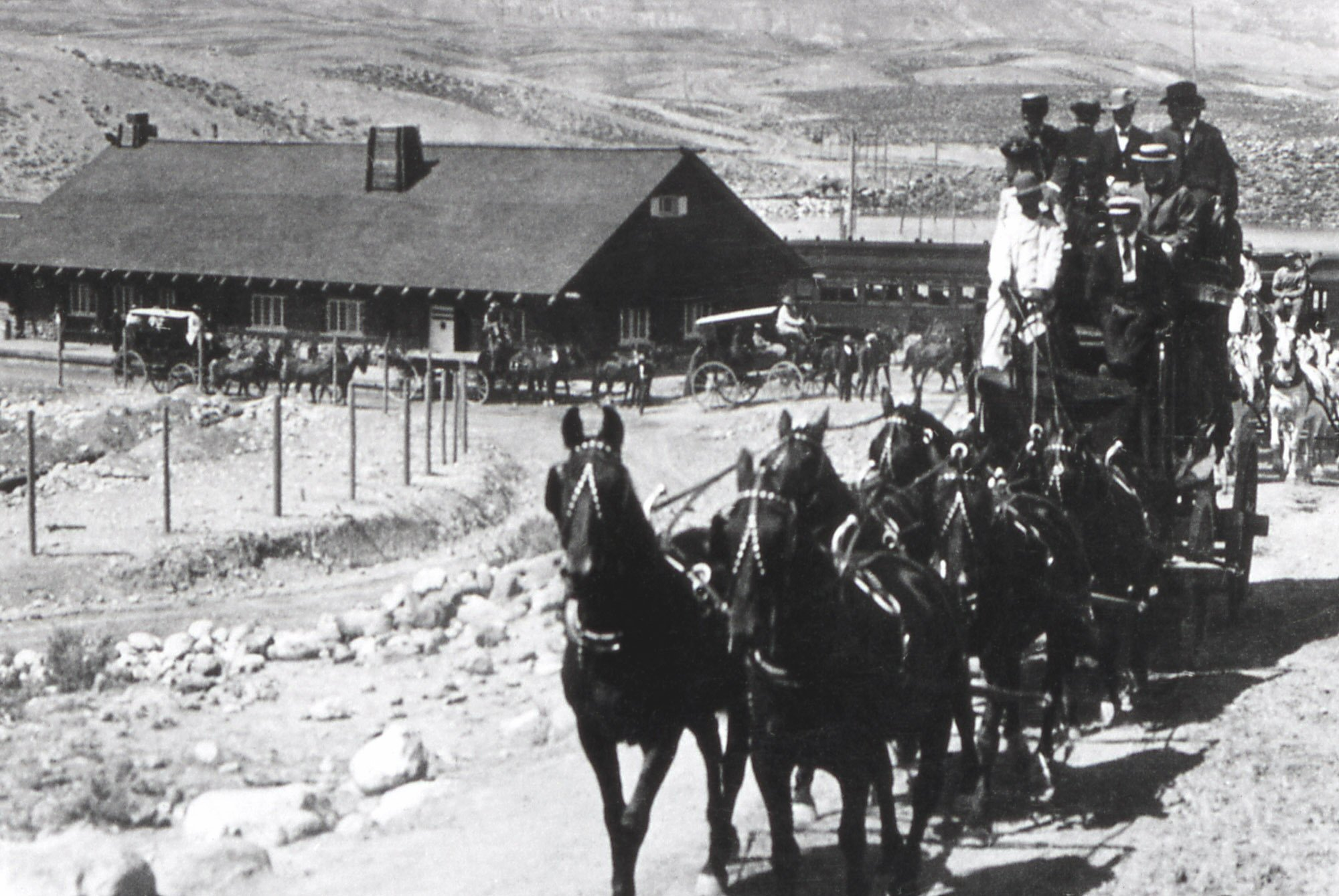
Stagecoaches en route to Mammoth, 1904

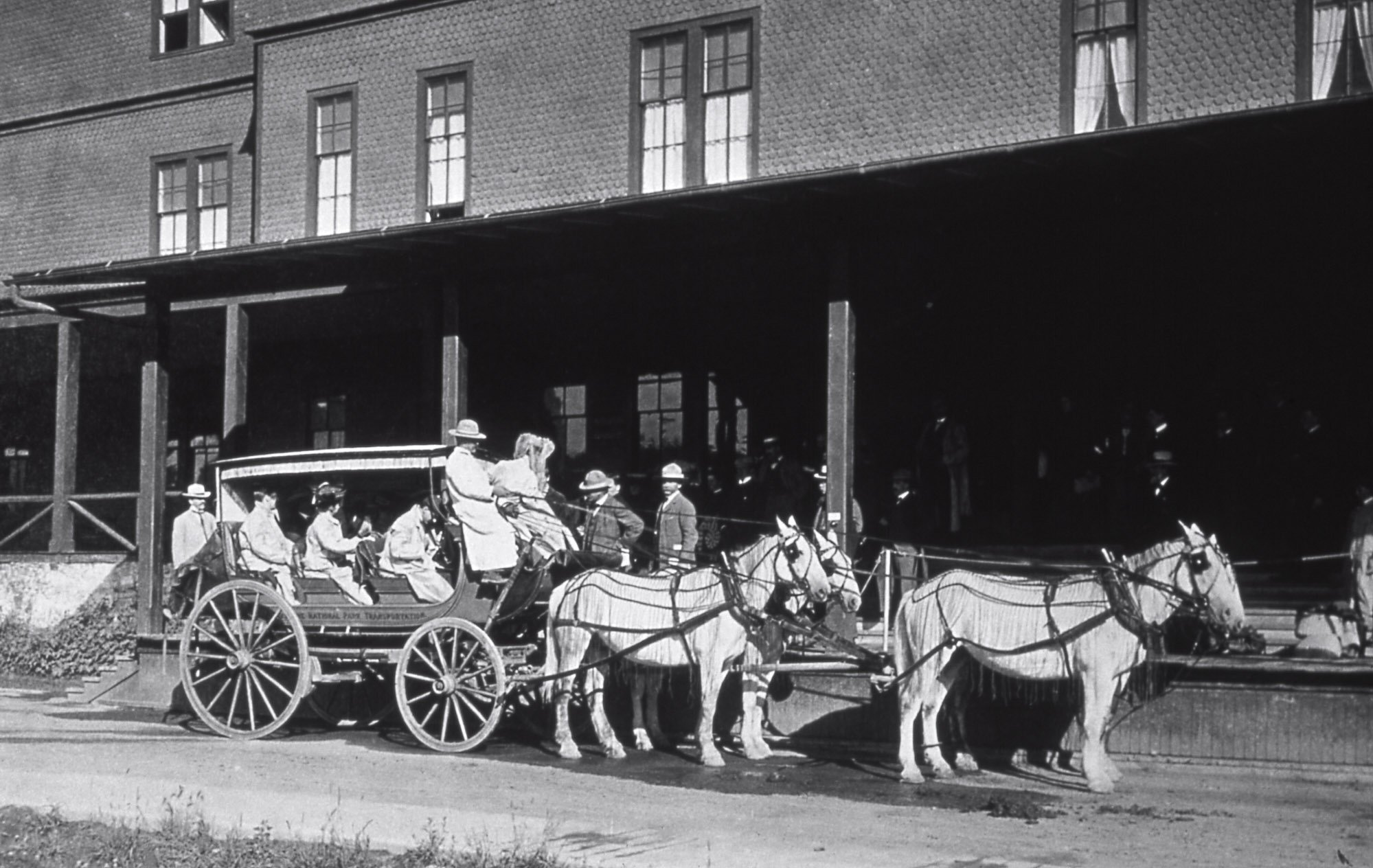
Stagecoaches at Mammoth

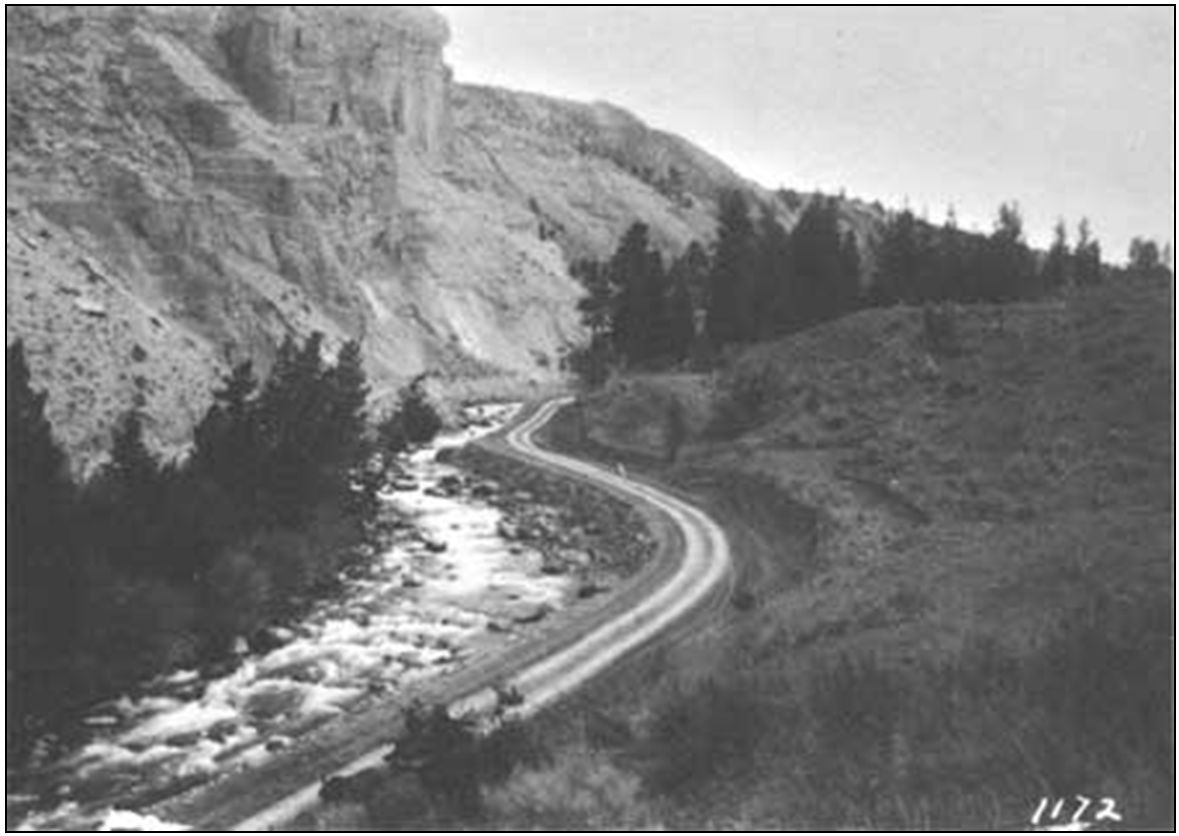
Lower Gardner River road, 1912

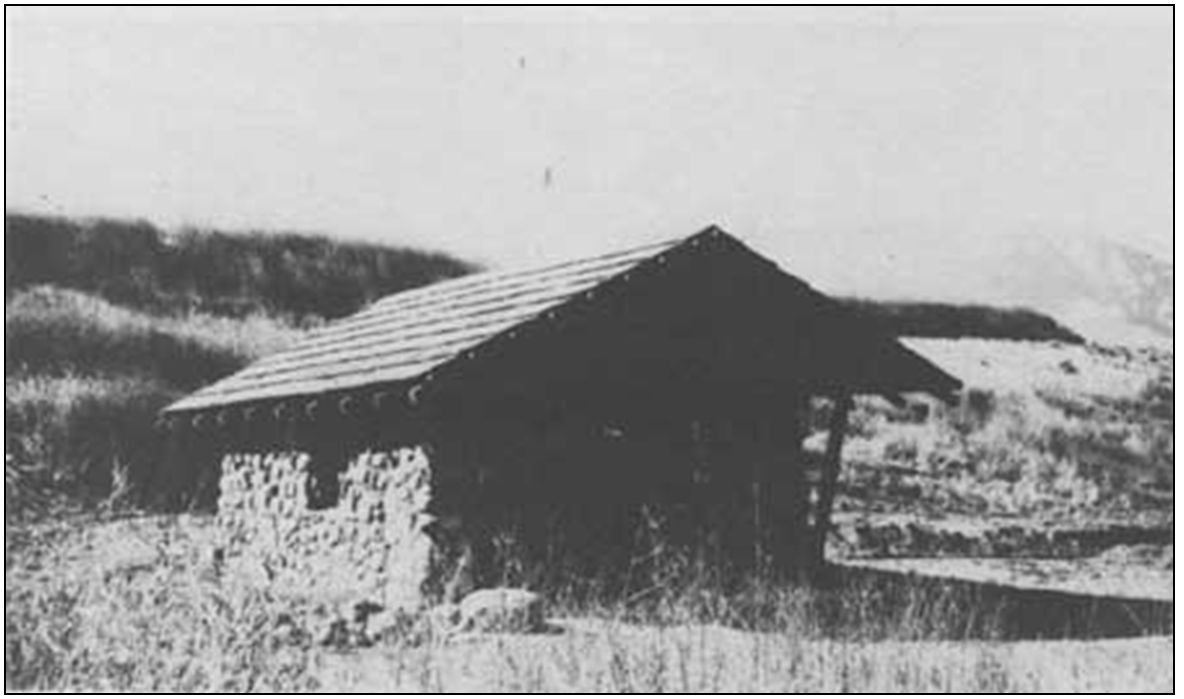
North Entrance Station, 1922

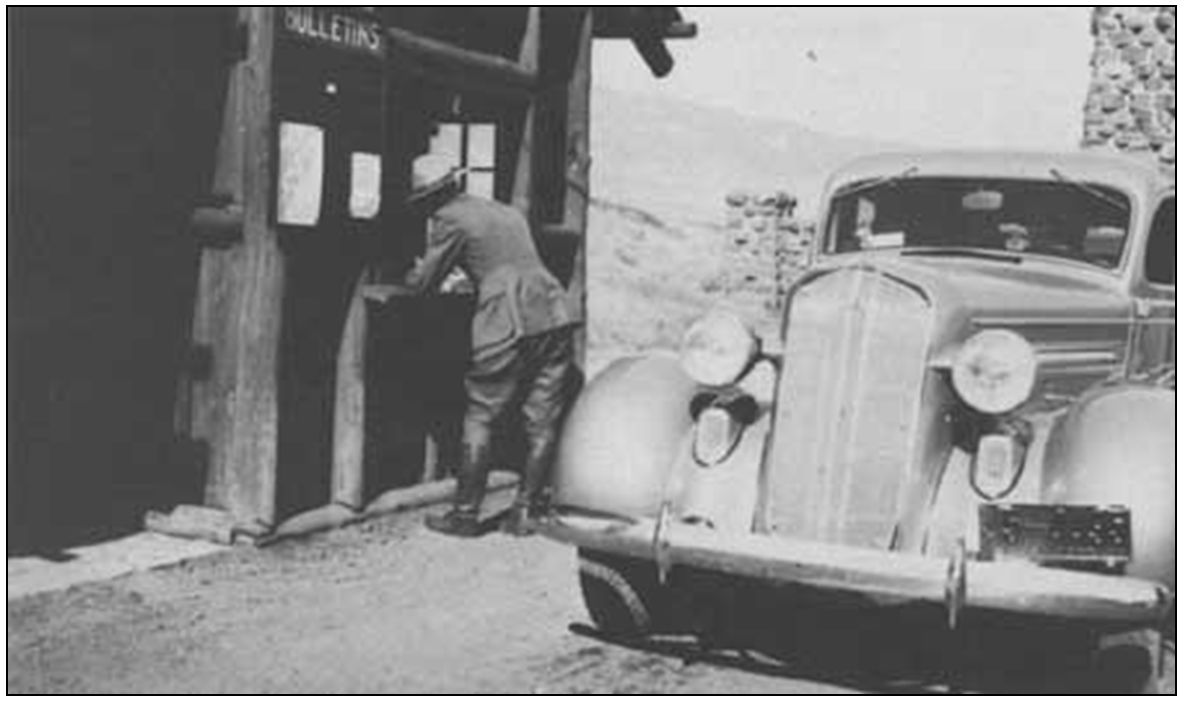
North Entrance Station, 1936

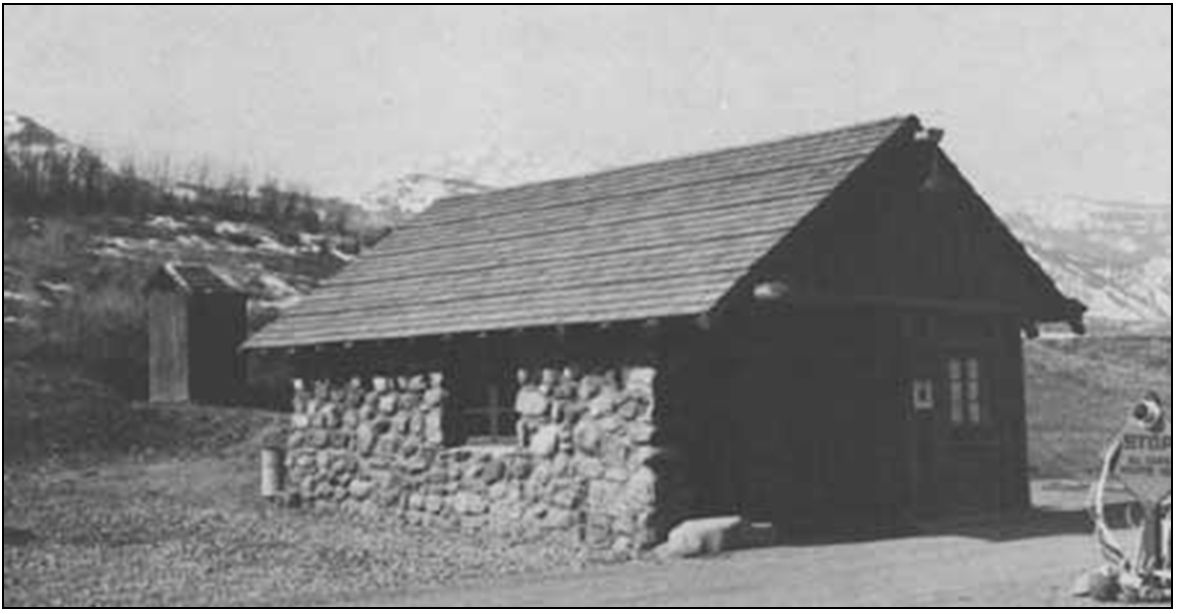
New North Entrance Station, 1938

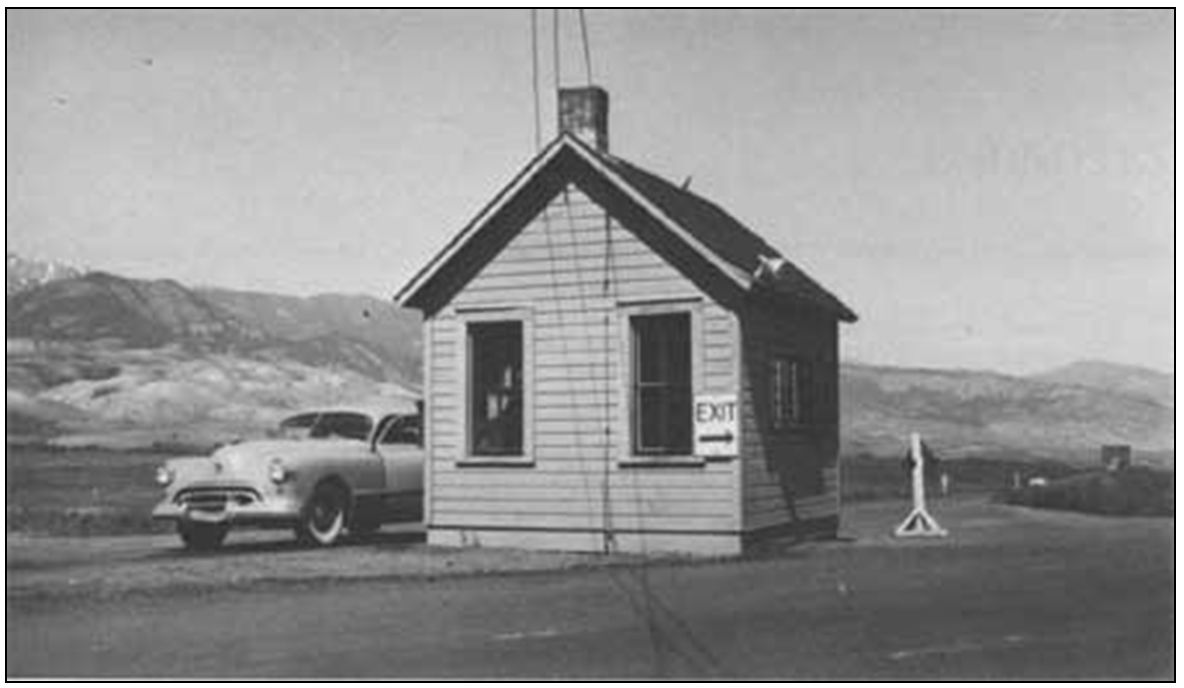
North Entrance Station, 1949

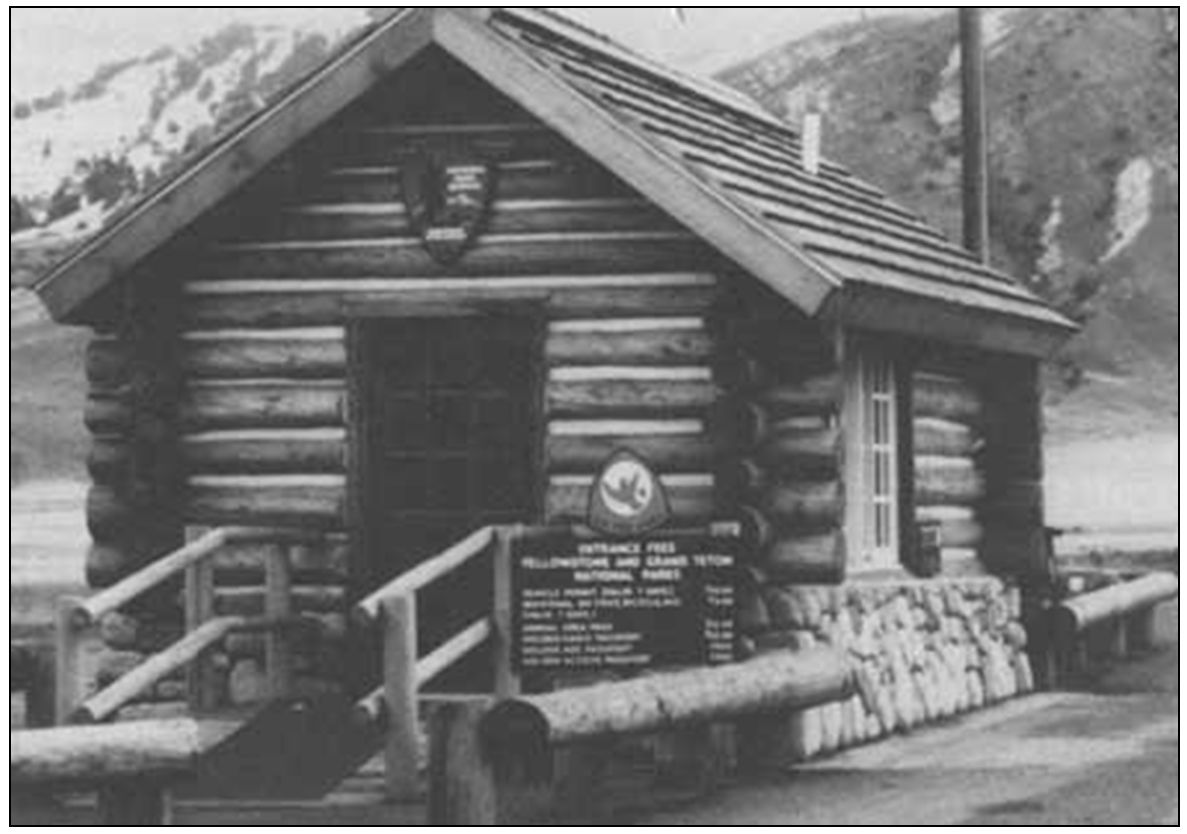
North Entrance Station, 1990

== See also ==
- National Register of Historic Places listings in Yellowstone National Park
- National Register of Historic Places listings in Park County, Montana
- National Register of Historic Places listings in Park County, Wyoming
- Fort Yellowstone
- Mammoth Hot Springs Historic District
