= Wilbanks =

Wilbanks may refer to:

== People with the surname ==
- Don Wilbanks (1926–2013), American actor
- George D. Wilbanks (1931–2012), American cancer researcher, surgeon, and professor
- George Wilbanks (born 1958), American executive recruiter; son of George D. Wilbanks
- Hilliard A. Wilbanks (1933–1967), American officer and pilot in the United States Air Force
- Jennifer Carol Wilbanks (born 1973), American woman who orchestrated a kidnapping hoax in Georgia, United States, known as the 2005 runaway bride case
- John Wilbanks, American medical director, known for his work on open science and research networks
- William Wilbanks (1940–2018), American criminologist and professor

== Other ==
- Mount Wilbanks, a mountain in Marie Byrd Land, Antarctica
- Wilbanks International, Inc., a subsidiary of CoorsTek
- Wilbanks Site, a Native American archaeological site in Georgia, United States

== See also ==
- Witbank, South Africa
