= Obsidian Cliff =

United States historic place in Wyoming

- U.S. National Register of Historic Places
- U.S. National Historic Landmark
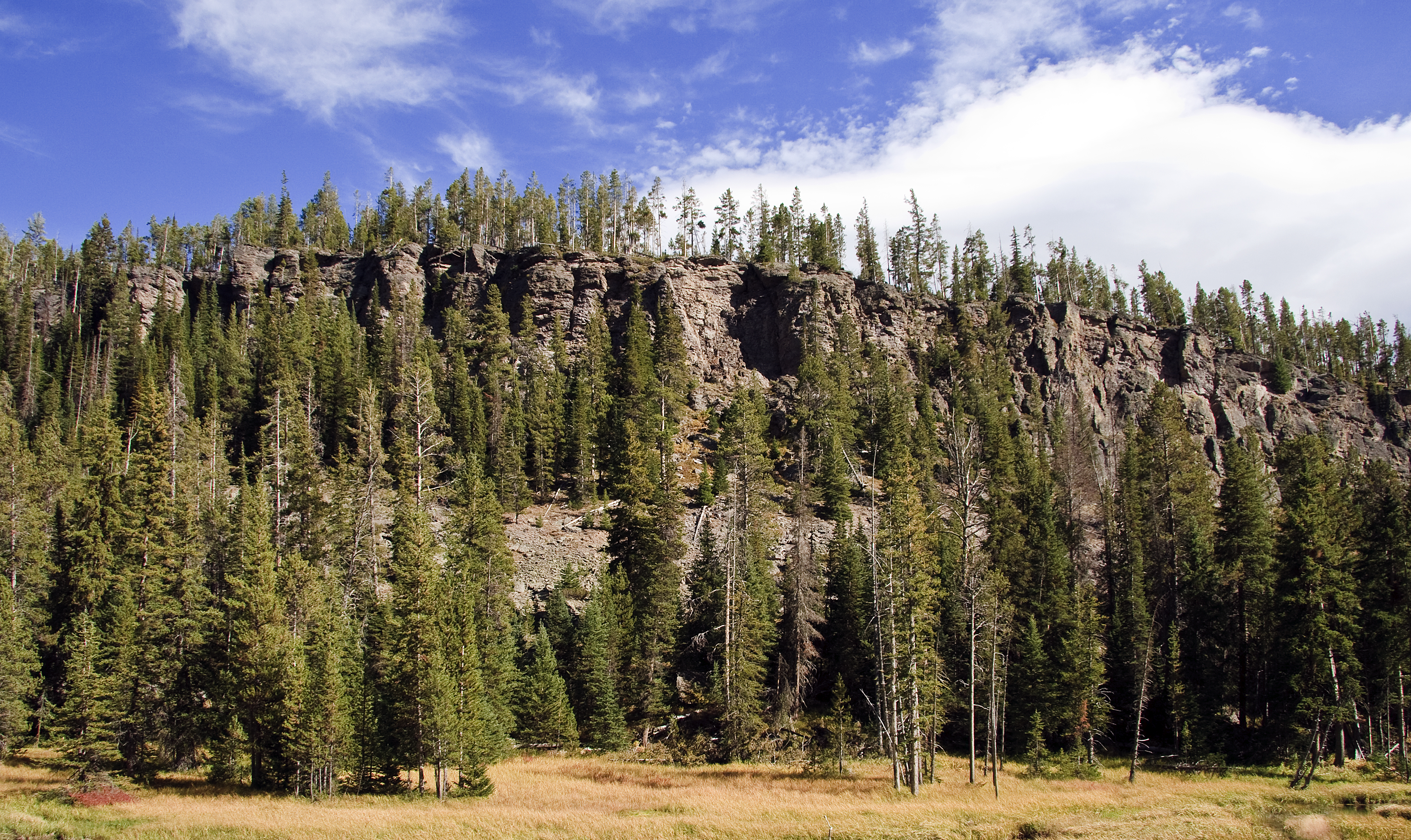
- Obsidian Cliff

- Location within Wyoming
- Nearest city: Mammoth Hot Springs, WY
- Coordinates: 44.8189°N 110.7278°W
- Area: 3,580 acres (14.5 km^{2})
- NRHP reference No.: 96000973

Significant dates
- Added to NRHP: June 19, 1996
- Designated NHL: June 19, 1996

- Obsidian Cliff Kiosk
- U.S. National Register of Historic Places
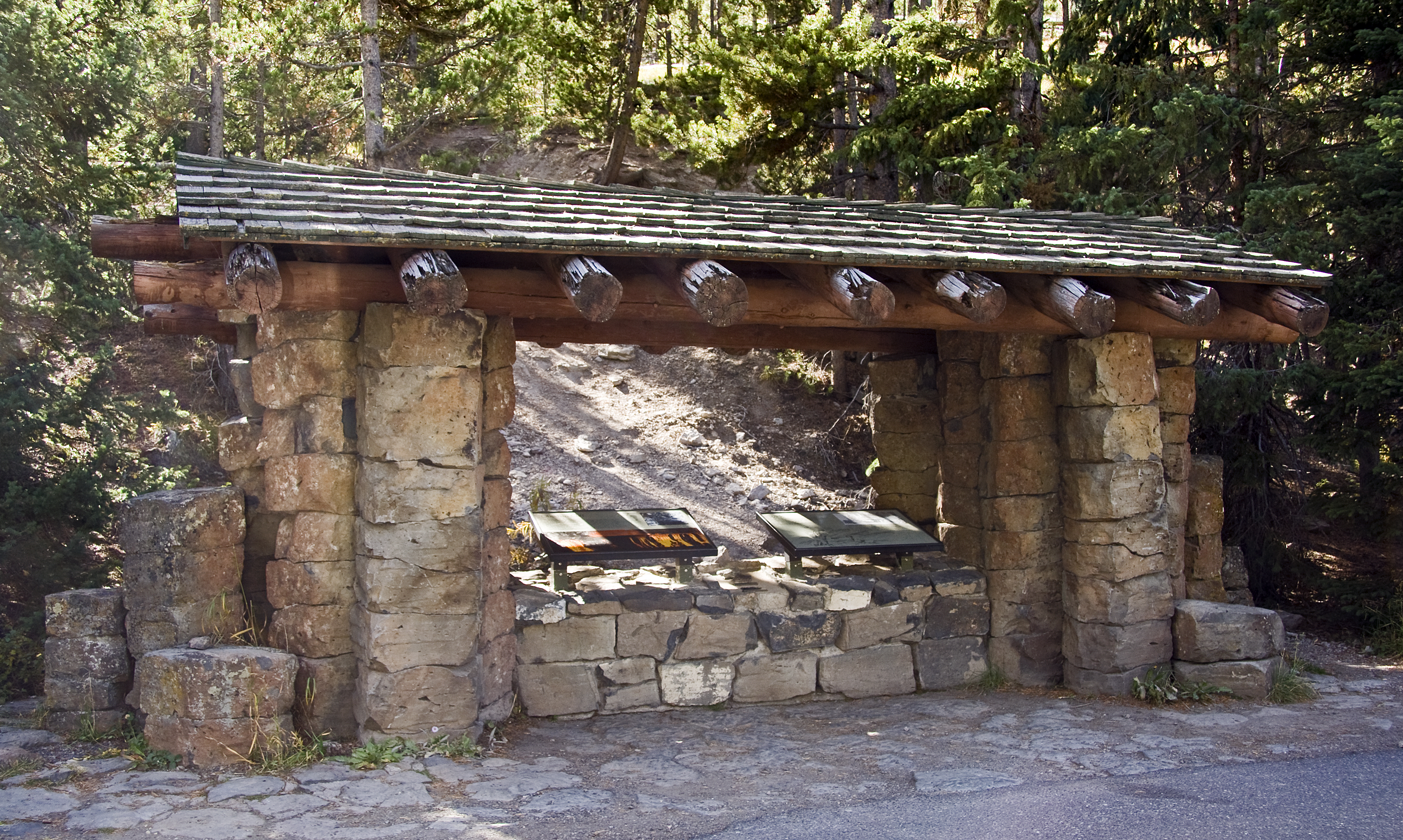
- Nearest city: Mammoth, Wyoming
- Coordinates: 44°49′26.38″N 110°43′45.3″W
- Built: 1931
- Architect: National Park Service
- MPS: Yellowstone National Park MPS
- NRHP reference No.: 82001719
- Added to NRHP: July 9, 1982

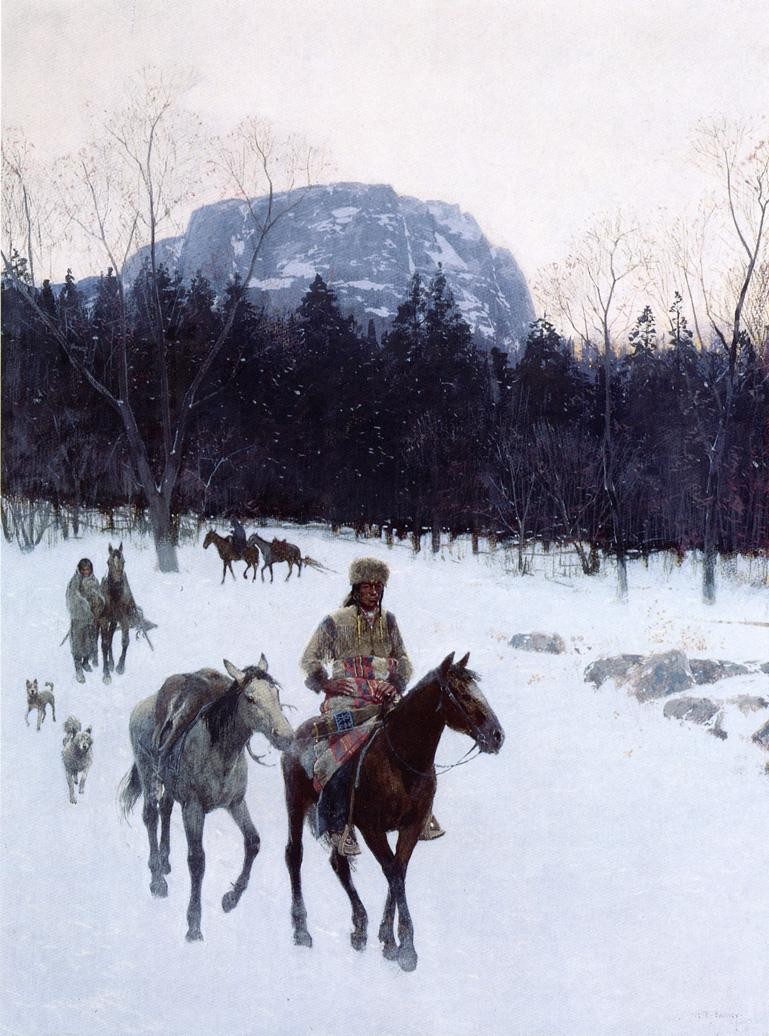
Obsidian Mountain in the Yellowstone, by Henry Farney

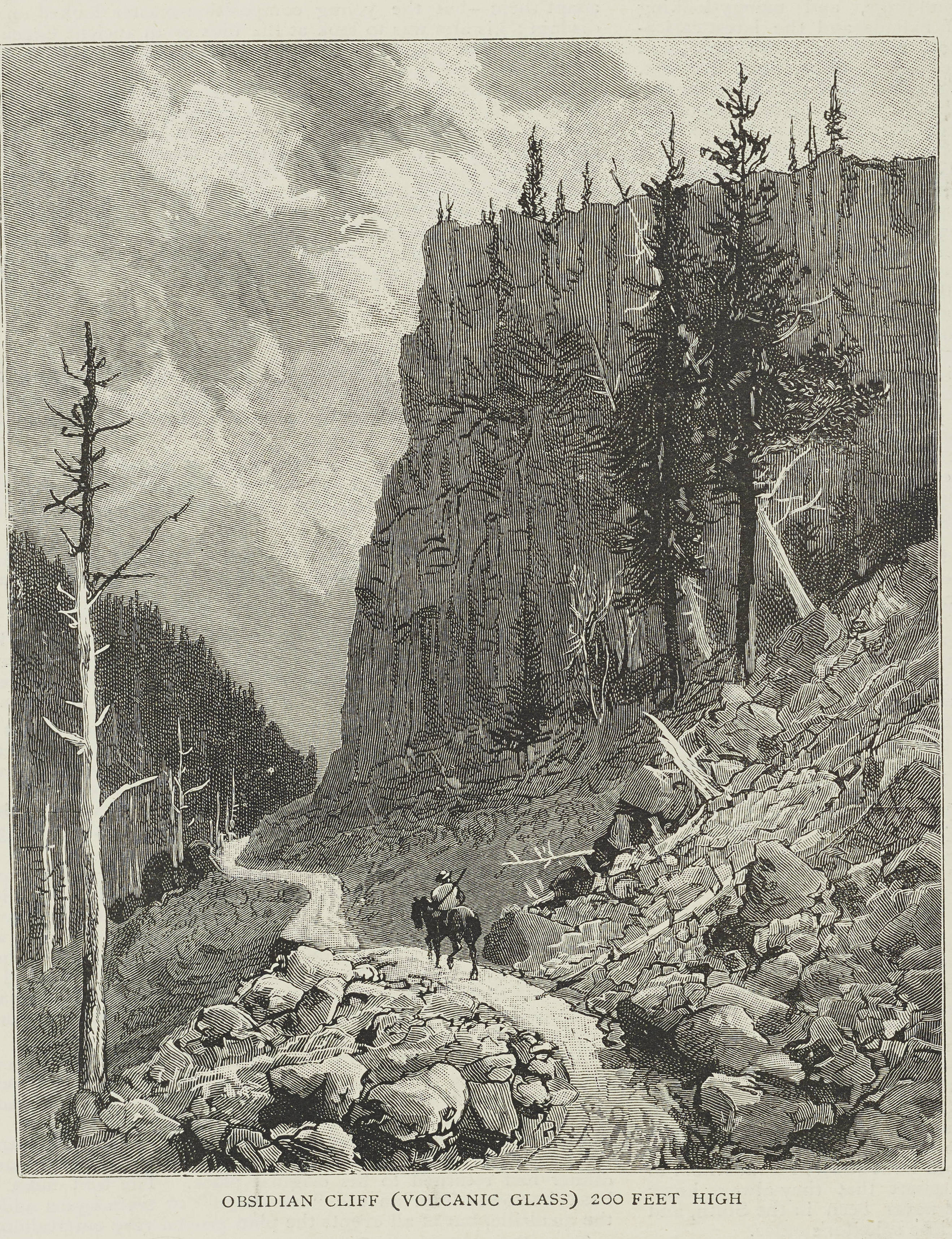
Illustration of Obsidian cliff (volcanic glass) 200 feet high. Aug 18, 1888

Obsidian Cliff, also known as 48YE433, was an important source of lithic materials for prehistoric peoples in Yellowstone National Park near Mammoth Hot Springs, Wyoming, United States. The cliff was named by Philetus Norris, the second park superintendent in 1878. It was declared a National Historic Landmark in 1996.

== Geography ==
It is located about 13 miles (21 km) south of Mammoth Hot Springs, on the east side of the Mammoth-Norris section of the Grand Loop Road. The Obsidian Cliff Kiosk, just north, is also listed on the National Register. Obsidian Cliff is also located on the northern end of Beaver Lake in Yellowstone National Park. A 1988 wildfire cleared trees from the site, allowing further archaeological expeditions.

== Geology ==
The cliff was formed from thick rhyolite lava flow that occurred about 180,000 years ago. The vertical columns are cooling fractures that formed as the thick lava flow cooled and crystallized. The Cliffs stands at an elevation of nearly 7,400 feet (2,300 m) above sea level and goes on for about half a mile. The cliffs also extend between 150 and 200 feet above Obsidian Creek. The flow consists of obsidian, a dark volcanic glass. The obsidian is most abundant at the base of the cliff and slowly tapers off to larger concentrations of pumice at the top.

== Significance to Native Americans ==
Obsidian has been quarried from the site for the past 12,000 years. Highly valued for its sharpness, Obsidian was used by Native Americans throughout the Western United States and Canada as knives, spear/arrow tips, and other ceremonial and sharp-edged objects. It appears that the Clovis culture (11,100–10,800 BC) did not use the obsidian consistently. Distinct types of projectiles made from Obsidian Cliff stone have been identified as belonging to the Goshen (9000–8500 BC), Folsom (8800–8300 BC), and Hell Gap (8500–8000 BC) cultures, all of which also visited Yellowstone infrequently. The earliest consistent, heavy excavation is connected to the Cody complex linked to Mummy Cave, circa 7000 BC. The Cody complex was likely following migrating bison herds.

Obsidian Cliff use was continuous throughout the Archaic period (8000–1000 BC) and peaked in the Late Prehistoric period (1000 BC–1000 AD). Thousands of pounds of obsidian was transported thousands of miles to Ohio using the Missouri, Mississippi, and Ohio rivers between ~200BC and ~400AD for use as ceremonial goods by the Hopewell Culture. Hopewell grave goods include not only obsidian, but also copper shaped to resemble the horns of bighorn sheep native to the Rockies, which suggests the Hopewell may have made the journey themselves. More recent Native groups more frequently made use of obsidian sources in Jackson, Wyoming which were closer and easier to access, but Obsidian Cliff seems to have retained ceremonial use. In oral traditions, the Shoshone, Blackfoot, and Salish and Kootenai recall women gathering cinnabar and other resources at the cliffs and making prayers there. The Crow people refer to Obsidian Cliff as Shiiptacha Awaxaawe, roughly meaning "Ricochet Mountain".

== Obsidian Cliff Kiosk ==
The Obsidian Cliff Kiosk is a small structure that shelters an interpretive exhibit in Yellowstone National Park at Obsidian Cliff. The kiosk was built in 1931 as part of an effort to provide interpretive exhibits along the park's Grand Loop Road. In common with the Fishing Bridge Museum, Madison Museum and Norris Museum, the kiosk exemplifies the National Park Service Rustic style. The interpretive exhibit was designed by National Park Service's Carl Russell, who provided many other innovations in visitor experiences.

This is significant as the first "wayside exhibit" in the National Park system.
