= Long Swamp Site =

Archaeological site

- Location within Georgia today
- 34°19′10.49″N 84°20′31.56″W
- Periods: Late Etowah Phase (1100 to 1200 CE)
- Cultures: South Appalachian Mississippian culture
- Location: Ball Ground, Georgia, Cherokee County, Georgia, United States
- Region: Cherokee County, Georgia

History
- Built: 1100 CE
- Abandoned: early 1600s

Site notes
- Excavation dates: 1938, 1940s, 2003–2004,
- Archaeologists: Robert Wauchope, Lewis H. Larson

Long Swamp Site (9 CK 1) is a 4-acre (16,000 m^{2}) archaeological site in Cherokee County, Georgia, United States, on the north shore of the Etowah River near St Rt 372. The site consists of a South Appalachian Mississippian culture village with a palisade and a platform mound.

== Description ==
The site is located on a floodplain and terrace overlooking the Etowah River from the north, near its confluence with Long Swamp Creek.

=== Chronology ===
The site was occupied at two different times during the prehistoric period, one dating from the Early Mississippian period Late Etowah Phase, circa 1100 to 1200 CE. It was again occupied during the late prehistoric period during the Mayes and Brewster Phases.

=== Features ===
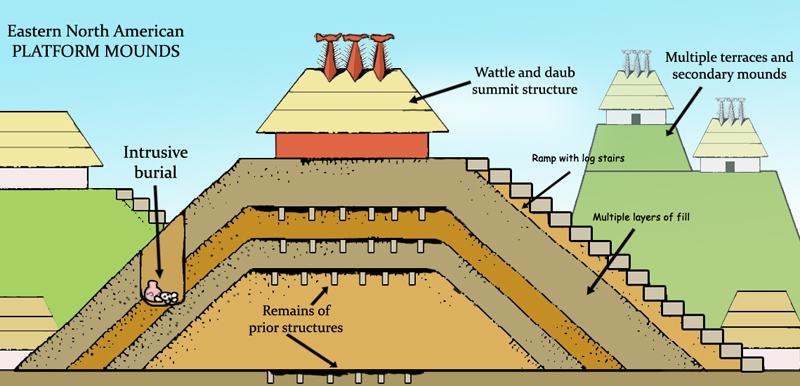
Diagram showing typical mound construction sequence

The platform mound at Long Swamp was constructed in three distinct episodes with ten separate layers during the Etowah Phase occupation. The location started as a circular structure, that was used as a burial site. Above this a 55 centimetres (1.80 ft) mound was constructed, with another structure gracing its summit. This building measured 6.8 metres (22 ft) in diameter and had a puddled clay floor and hearth. On top of this layer was another layer and circular structure. Above this layer was a third layer of mound fill, which reached a final height estimated to have been between 3 metres (9.8 ft) and 4 metres (13 ft), although by the time of archaeological investigations the summit had been too damaged to determine if it also had an accompanying structure. Sometime after the final layer was added to the mound the entire site was flooded leaving a layer of silt blanketing the area. No additional layers were added to the site during the second occupation.

The remains of several other structures have also been found at the site. Structures dating from the Late Etowah Phase include an encircling palisade and ditch and a large rectangular structure. This building measured 7 metres (23 ft) by 8 metres (26 ft), and was constructed of posts with a central hearth and storage pits. The structure was found to have been burned. A few borrow pits were located outside of the palisade.

On the terrace portion of the site overlooking the floodplain was a large circular structure with a central hearth. It had a diameter of about 6 metres (20 ft) and used twenty-two posts for its exterior walls. It had a 1 metre (3.3 ft) wide entrance way on its southeastern side. A 50 centimetres (1.6 ft) walkway with two 25 centimetres (0.82 ft) wide trenches extended 2 metres (6.6 ft) from the wall of the building. This structure was also found to have been burned. Carbon dating of the remains place its occupation to roughly 1610.

== Excavation history ==
Portions of the site were excavated in 1938 by Robert Wauchope and again in 1949 by Lewis H. Larson, under the direction of Arthur Randolph Kelly. The site was surveyed by Southeastern Archeological Services in 2003 and 2004 and then thoroughly excavated by Edwards-Pitman Environmental, Inc. in the late 2000s.

== See also ==
- Etowah Mounds
- Wilbanks Site
- List of Mississippian sites
