= Leake Mounds =

Archaeological site in Georgia, U.S.

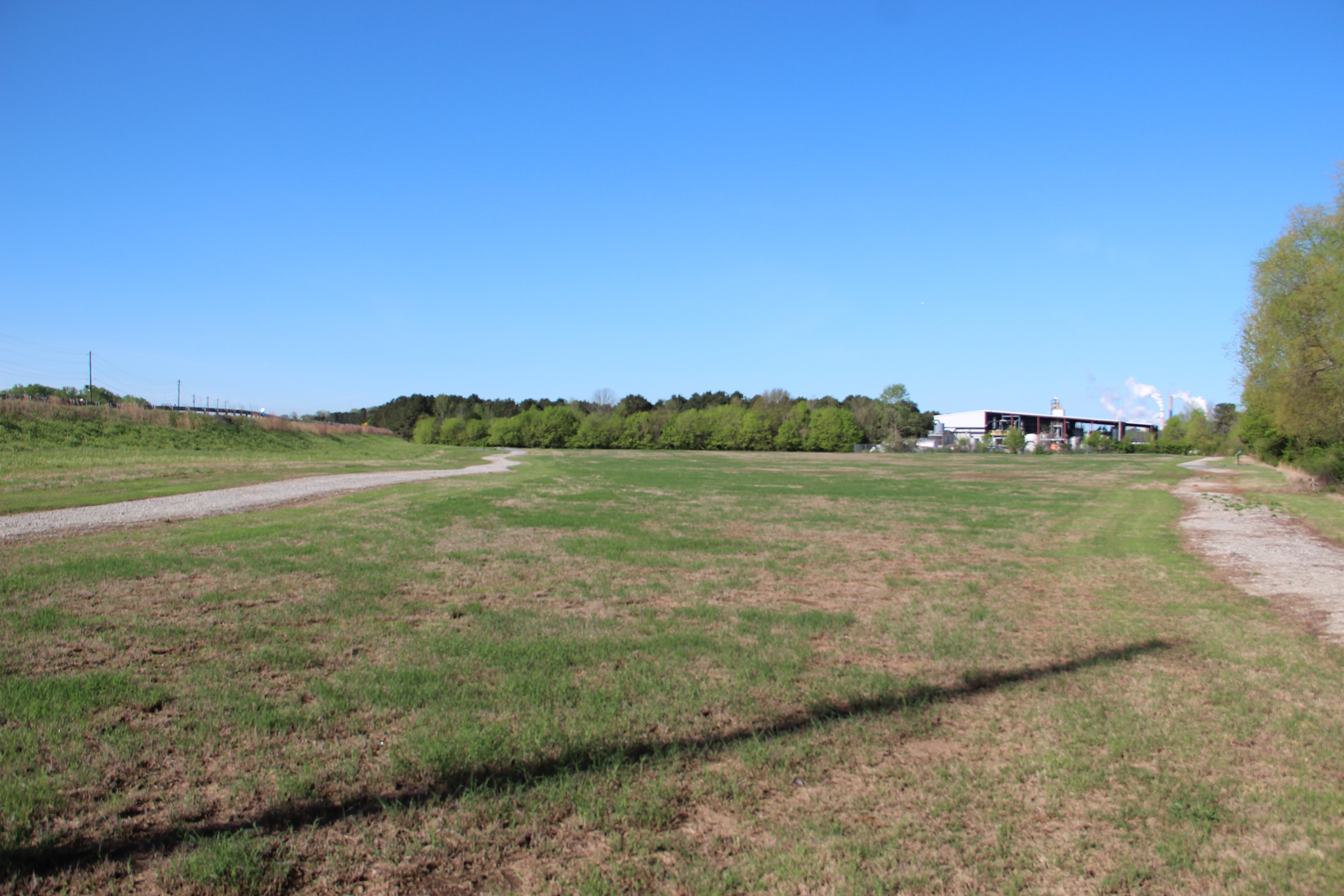
- Leake Mounds site in 2015

- Location within Georgia today
- 34°8′21.55″N 84°50′46.03″W
- Periods: Middle Woodland, Lamar phase
- Cultures: Swift Creek Culture, South Appalachian Mississippian culture
- Location: Cartersville, Georgia, Bartow County, Georgia, USA
- Region: Bartow County, Georgia

History
- Built: 300 BCE
- Abandoned: 1500 CE

Site notes
- Architectural style: Number of temples: 3

Leake Mounds (9BR2) is an important archaeological site in Bartow County, Georgia built and used by peoples of the Swift Creek Culture. The site is 2 miles (3.2 km) west of the well-known Etowah Mounds on the Etowah River. It predates that site by hundreds of years.

Excavation of nearly 50,000 square feet (4,600 m^{2}) on the site showed that Leake Mounds was one of the most important Middle Woodland period site in this area from around 300 BCE to 650 CE. It was a center with ties throughout the Southeast and Midwest. It was abandoned about 650 CE. It was not occupied again for nearly nine hundred years, until about 1500, by different peoples near the end of the Mississippian culture period.

The site includes at least three major platform mounds and a large semi-circular moat/ditch. While much of the mounds were razed to be used as road fill for the expansion of the Georgia State Route 113 and Georgia State Route 61 in the 1940s, significant portions of the site remain. Several sites on nearby Ladds Mountain were integrally associated with Leake, including Shaw Mound, a stone burial mound; Indian Fort, a stone wall enclosure; and Ladds Cave, a large cave.

Examples of a type of pottery decoration consisting of a diamond-shaped checks found at Leake Mounds are also known from Hopewell sites in Ohio (such as Seip, Rockhold, Harness, and Turner), the Mann site in southern Indiana. This style has also been found on pottery at other sites in the South, such as the Miner's Creek site, 9HY98, and Mandeville site in Georgia, and the Yearwood site in southern Tennessee.

== See also ==
- Etowah Indian Mounds (9BR1)
- King Archaeological Site
- List of burial mounds in the United States
- List of Hopewell sites
