= Mann site =

Mann Site
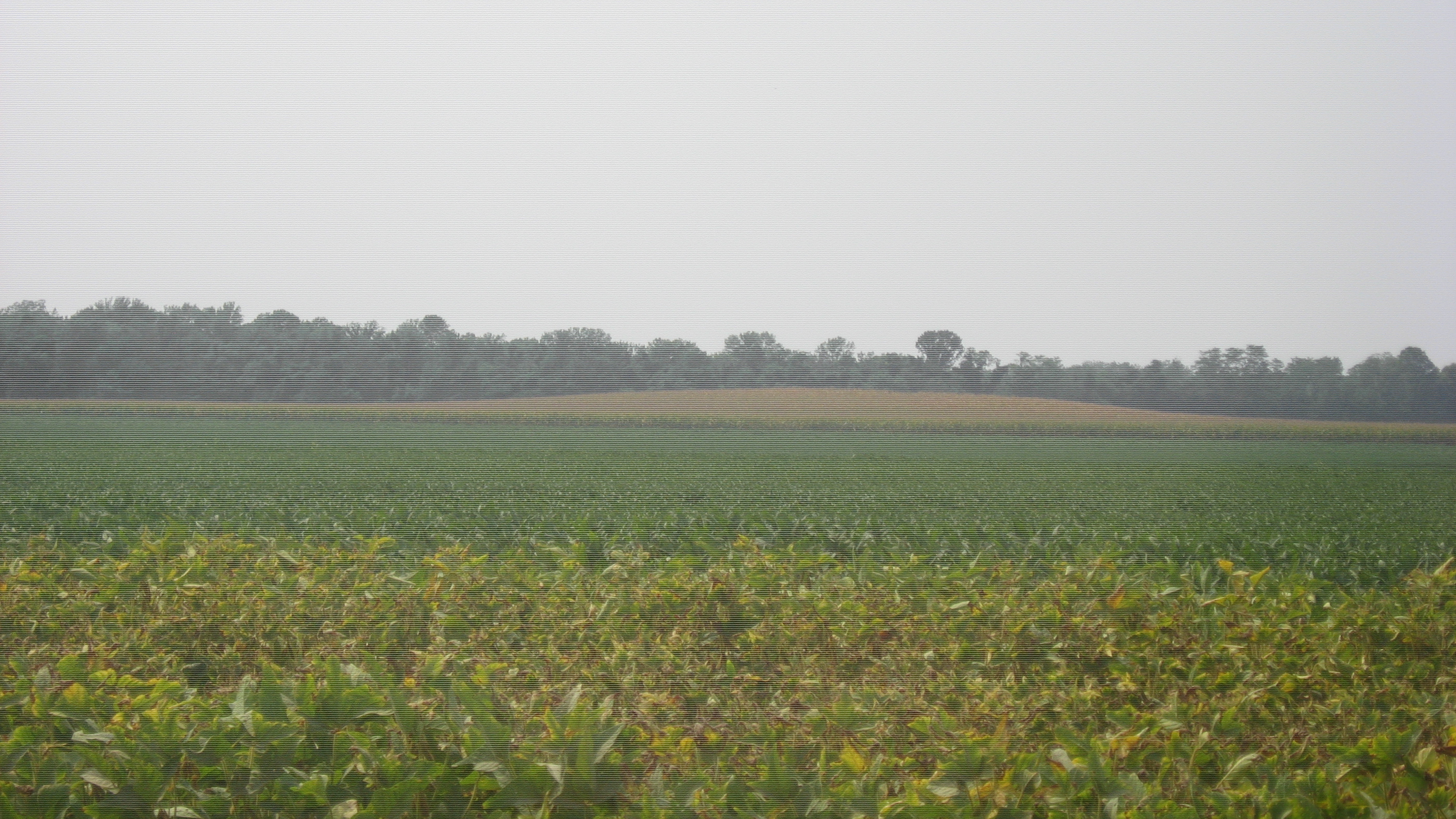
- Overview of the site, looking west

- Location in Indiana today
- 37°54′44.5″N 87°50′20″W
- Cultures: Crab Orchard culture
- Location: Mt. Vernon, Indiana, U.S.
- Region: Posey County, Indiana, U.S.

Site notes
- Architectural style: Number of temples:
- Mann Site
- U.S. National Register of Historic Places
- Area: 300 acres (120 ha)
- NRHP reference No.: 74000018
- Added to NRHP: October 01, 1974

The Mann Site (12 Po 2) is a Crab Orchard culture site located off Indian Mound Road in Mount Vernon, Indiana. It was placed on the National Historic Register on October 1, 1974. Exotic ceramics and other artifacts found at the site reflect contact with Ohio Hopewell people, in addition to more distant peoples in the Southeast of the Swift Creek culture of the Georgia Piedmont and Gulf Coastal Plain.

In addition, the scale and complexity of works here suggests that the population was larger than at comparable Ohio sites. It may have been the largest Hopewell site in the Midwest.

== Description ==
The site is a large late Middle Woodland period multicomponent complex of mounds, geometric earthworks, and habitation sites near the confluence of the Wabash and Ohio rivers in extreme southwestern Indiana, dating between about 100 and 500 CE. It is located on a high river terrace.

The scale and complexity of mounds and other earthworks at the Mann Site is rivaled in the Midwest only by the Hopewell sites of southern Ohio. Its population size may have been on a scale unparalleled by any of the Ohio centers and perhaps by any other Hopewell site in the Midwest.

== Significance ==
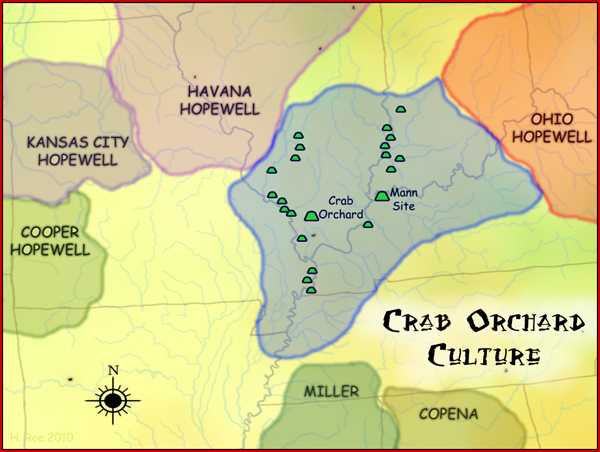
Crab Orchard culture and some major sites and related cultures

Many artifacts of exotic raw materials and foreign manufacture recovered from the site reflect participation in Hopewell ceremonialism and status differentiation. A unique aspect of the materials found is the large amount of complicated stamped, simple stamped, and tetrapodal vessels. Vessels such as these are commonly found in contemporary sites from the southeastern United States, but are rare in the Ohio Valley. These ceramics are stylistically similar to Early Swift Creek culture ceramics commonly found in the Georgia Piedmont and Gulf Coastal Plain. Some of the design motifs documented at the Mann Site are identical to examples found in Georgia.

Microscopic and x-ray diffraction analysis of these artifacts shows the most likely source for these exotic ceramics lies in the Blue Ridge and southern Appalachian Piedmont Provinces. Investigations in the Blue Ridge and southern Appalachian Piedmont Provinces show that sites from the Middle Woodland Connestee phase were in contact with Ohio Hopewell populations between about 200 and 500 CE. Evidence for this contact comes from similarities in vessel form, decoration, surface treatment and tempering agents. These attributes are also shared with stamped sherds from the Mann Site. This suggests that the fine simple stamped sherds at the Mann Site were manufactured by Connestee phase populations in the Appalachian Summit area.

The rarity of these artifacts suggests that at Ohio Hopewell interactions with populations in the Appalachian Summit area, Georgia Piedmont and Gulf Coastal Plain were uncommon occurrences, characterized by the occasional northern movement of ceramics. Another unusual occurrence at the Mann Site is the local production of vessels using Georgian Piedmont designs in significant numbers. Examples of a type of pottery decoration consisting of a diamond-shaped checks found at the Mann Site are also known from Hopewell sites in Ohio (such as Seip Earthworks, Rockhold, Harness, and Turner), as well as from Southeastern sites with Hopewellian assemblages, such as the Miner's Creek site, Leake Mounds, 9HY98, and Mandeville site in Georgia, and the Yearwood site in southern Tennessee.

== See also ==
- Mount Vernon Site - Large Hopewell mound located several miles down the Ohio River. Looted and mostly destroyed in 1988.
- Hopewell tradition
- List of Hopewell sites
- List of archaeological sites on the National Register of Historic Places in Indiana
