= Mount Vernon Site =

Hopewell Culture archeological site

- Mount Vernon Site; 12 Po 885
- U.S. National Register of Historic Places
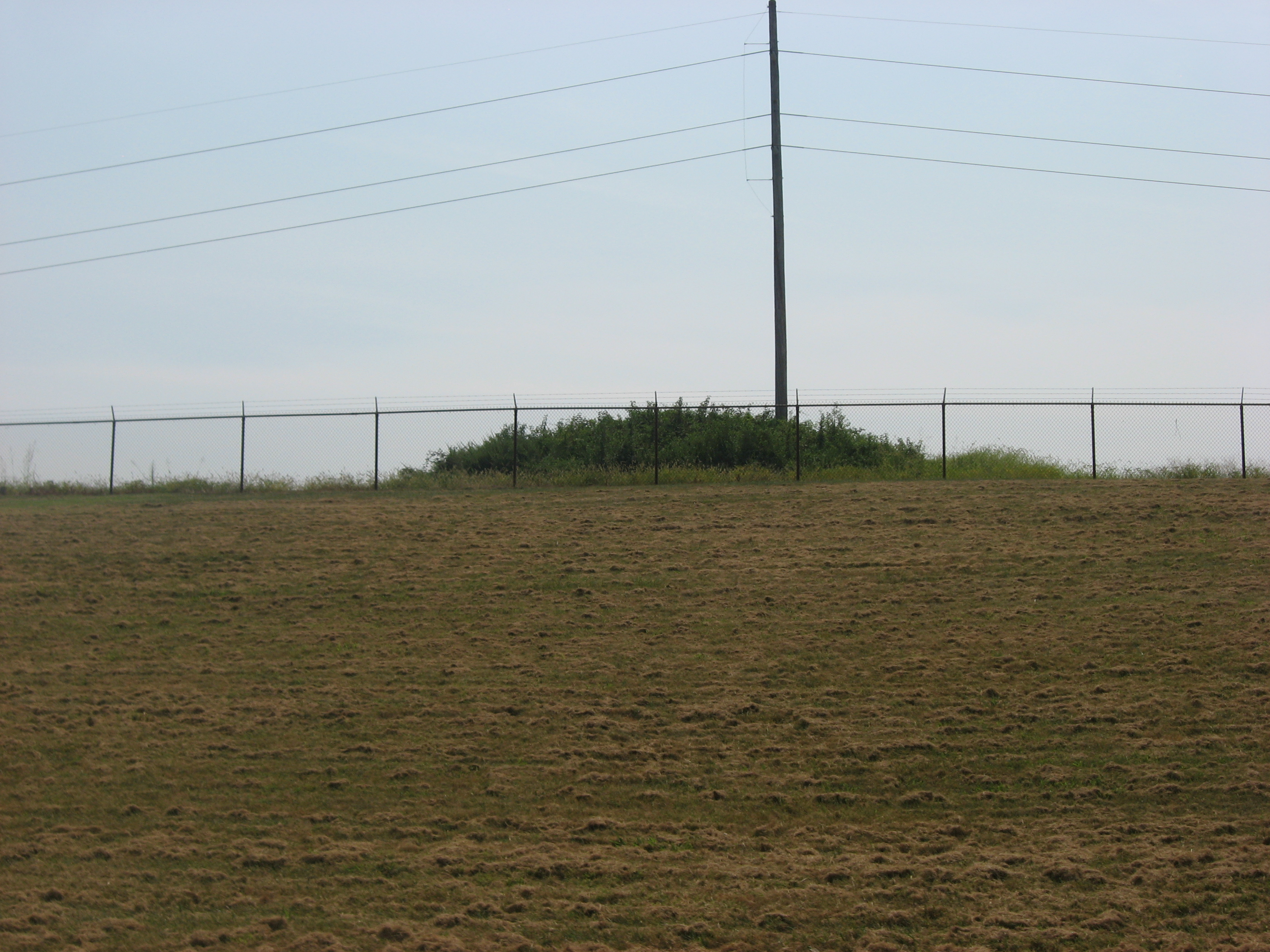
- Remains of the site in 2011

- Location within Indiana
- Location: Posey County, Indiana
- Coordinates: 37°54′48″N 87°56′23″W
- Built: ~100 AD
- Architectural style: Crab Orchard Culture
- NRHP reference No.: 95001542
- Added to NRHP: 11 January 1996

The Mount Vernon Site, also known as the GE Mound, is a Hopewell site near Mount Vernon in southwest Indiana. The site was discovered and mostly destroyed in 1988 during road construction at a General Electric plastic manufacturing facility. The mound was partially leveled, used for road fill, and subject to widespread looting shortly after its discovery, resulting in a contentious and precedent-setting prosecution under the Archeological Resources Protection Act. It was one of the five largest recorded Hopewell mounds before its destruction. The depth and breadth of artifacts recovered from the site are some of the most significant of all Hopewell sites and even in its degraded condition it is one of the most significant Hopewell mounds yet discovered.

== Characteristics ==
Before its destruction, the mound was loaf-shaped and measured 125 m (410 ft) long, 50 m (160 ft) wide, and 6 m (20 ft), with evidence of potential structures or tombs within the body of the mound. This large size makes it one of the five largest known Hopewell mounds. The mound is located near the confluence of the Ohio and Wabash rivers near another large-scale Hopewell site, the Mann site. The mound was used as a ceremonial and burial site, most likely by the Mann phase of the Crab Orchard Culture.

A great number of artifacts were discovered inside the mound, with both the quantity and quality unmatched by few other Hopewell sites. The thousands of chert bifaces, dozens of quartz and obsidian blades, copper celts, silver ear spools, and bear teeth are common at Hopewell sites but have rarely been found in such numbers. Rarer artifacts include panpipes, carved coal ornaments and worked human and animal bones. Particularly notable are intact organic artifacts including fragments of cloth and decorated leather ornaments which have rarely survived due to their fragile organic nature.

Some of these artifacts traveled great distances, with the copper and silver originating in the Keweenaw Peninsula in northern Michigan and the obsidian coming all the way from Obsidian Cliff in Wyoming. Pearls produced in the area have been found at both Mount Vernon and Ohio Hopewell sites, potentially indicating trade connections between Mount Vernon and the wider prehistoric-United States.

== Discovery and looting ==
Preliminary surveys prior to a 1988 highway extension project identified the feature as a natural hill to be used for road fill. During planned work between April and June 1988, artifacts were discovered as the mound was being leveled. After highway work had finished, local collectors were made aware of this and descended upon the site – looting thousands of artifacts from what was left of the mound without informing the landowner, General Electric, or state authorities as required by state law. Indiana Department of Highways archeologists learned of the site in October of that year after an anonymous tip, and began work to salvage what was left of the mound.

== Trial and controversy ==
Media coverage brought public outrage and attention to the site. Multiple parties including General Electric, Federal and State government and Native American tribes had significant cause for outrage. In a then-novel case, the FBI began investigating and brought charges against five looters under the 1979 Archeological Resources Protection Act. As part of a plea deal, the looters returned any unsold artifacts and described the unaltered condition of the mound to archeologists. Fines and jail time were leveled on the looters, and the case helped to establish the legitimacy of federal protections on archeological sites. The trial exacerbated existing stresses between archeologists, native groups and amateur archeologists.

The artifacts were reburied in 1994 without proper scientific study at the insistence of out-of-state Native American groups. The marginalization of local Indian group wishes and the loss of rare and significant artifacts caused a second round of controversy.

Today the mound is mostly destroyed and the remnants lie on well protected private property – currently owned by SABIC.

== See also ==
- Mann Site – Related large Hopewell mound complex located several miles up the Ohio River
- List of archaeological sites on the National Register of Historic Places in Indiana
