= Norris, Madison, and Fishing Bridge Museums =

- U.S. National Register of Historic Places
- U.S. National Historic Landmark District
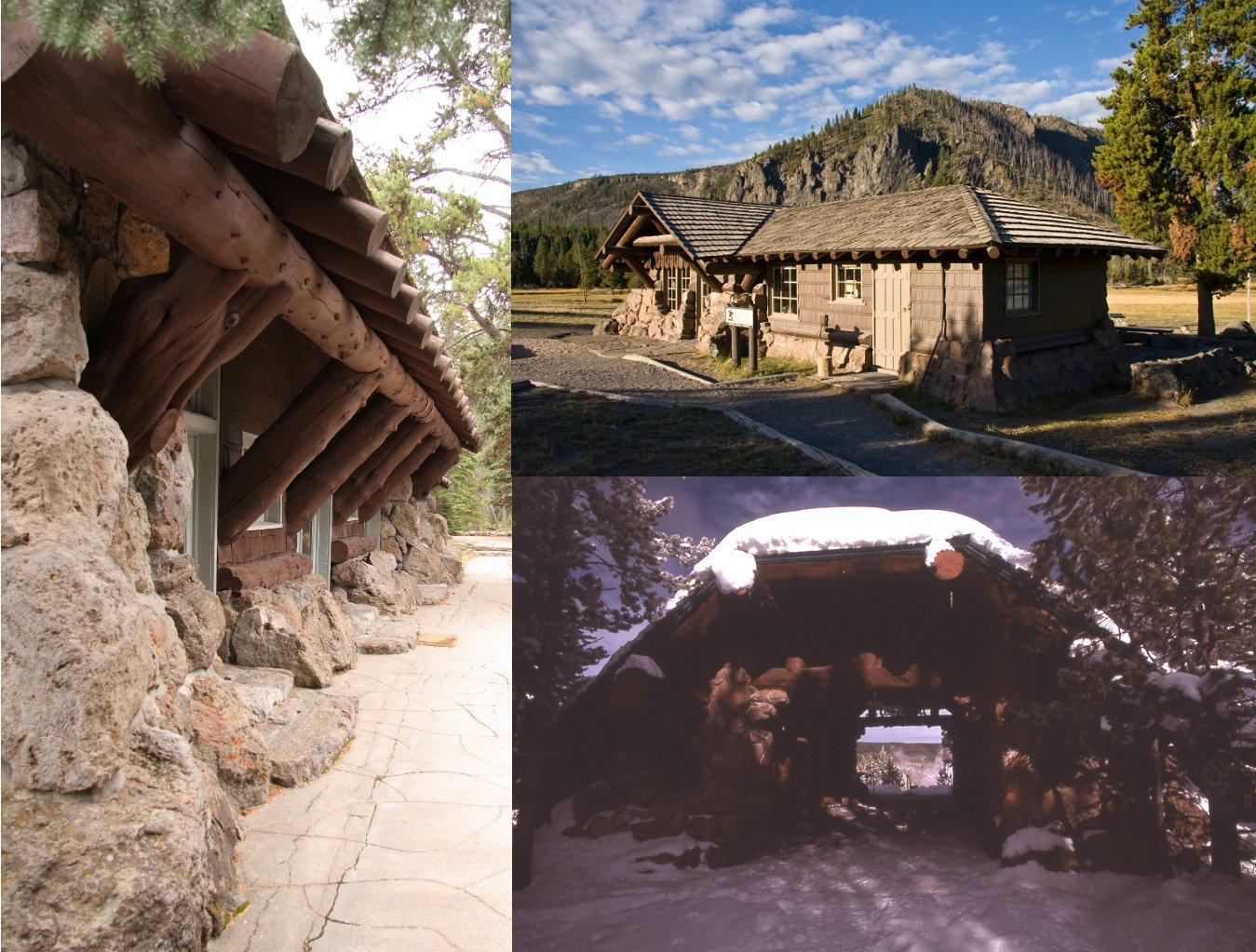
- Clockwise from left: Fishing Bridge, Madison, Norris
- Location: Norris Geyser Basin, Madison Junction, and Fishing Bridge, Yellowstone National Park, Wyoming
- Area: 3 acres (1.2 ha)
- Built: 1929
- Architect: Herbert Maier
- NRHP reference No.: 87001445

Significant dates
- Added to NRHP: May 28, 1987
- Designated NHLD: May 28, 1987

The Norris, Madison, and Fishing Bridge Museums are three "trailside museums" within Yellowstone National Park in the western United States. Built in 1929 to designs by Herbert Maier, they are preeminent early examples of the National Park Service Rustic style of architecture, and served as models for the construction of park buildings elsewhere in the park system in the 1930s. They were collectively designated a National Historic Landmark in 1987.

== Description and history ==
The three landmarked museums are the Norris Museum (44°43′35″N 110°42′12″W), the Madison Museum (44°38′32″N 110°51′43.7″W), and the Fishing Bridge Museum (44.563028°N 110.377694°W). The Madison and Norris Museums are separated by a distance of 14 miles (23 km), while the Fishing Bridge Museum is more than 40 miles (64 km) away from the other two by road. All three were designed by architect Herbert Maier in a style that has become known as National Park Service Rustic. A fourth museum, the Old Faithful Museum of Thermal Activity, also designed by Maier, was built at the same time. It was demolished in 1971 to make way for a new visitor center, which has itself been replaced. The architecture of these buildings is characterized by rubble stone and shingle-clad walls, gabled roofs with clipped ends, flagstone floors some places, and peeled log posts as internal supports.

The three surviving museums, along with the now-demolished Faithful Museum of Thermal Activity, were designed by Herbert Maier, an architect employed by the American Association of Museums and the Laura Spelman Rockefeller Foundation. In addition to designing the Yosemite museums, he also designed buildings at the Grand Canyon, and the National Park Service Southwest Regional Office, also a National Historic Landmark. Maier was influential, both personally and through these early works, in spreading this type of architecture throughout national and state parks and forests, particularly in works created by Depression-era jobs of the 1930s.

== See also ==
- National Register of Historic Places listings in Park County, Wyoming
- List of National Historic Landmarks in Wyoming
