= Herbert Maier =

American architect (1893–1969)

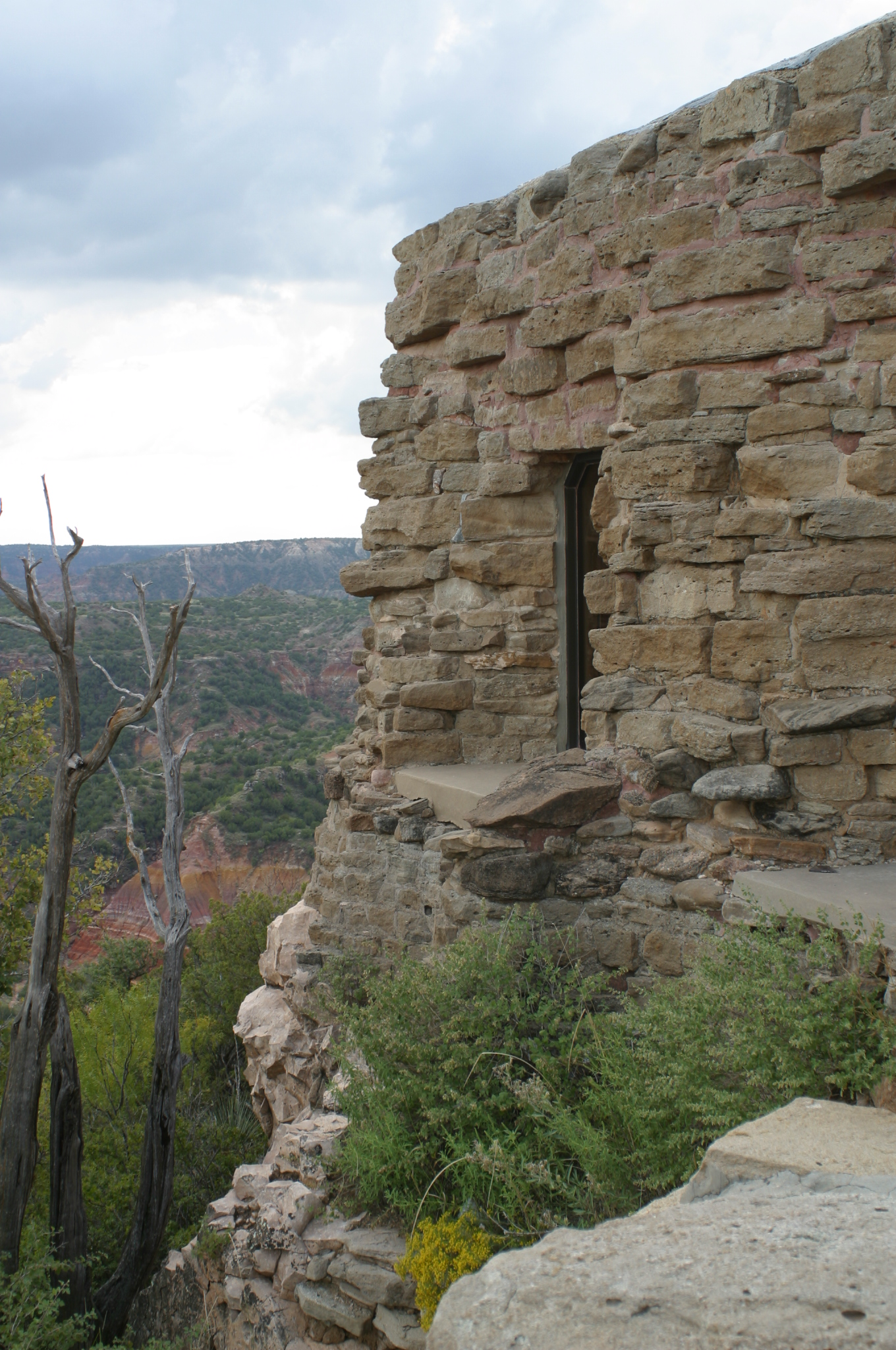
Palo Duro Canyon, Texas

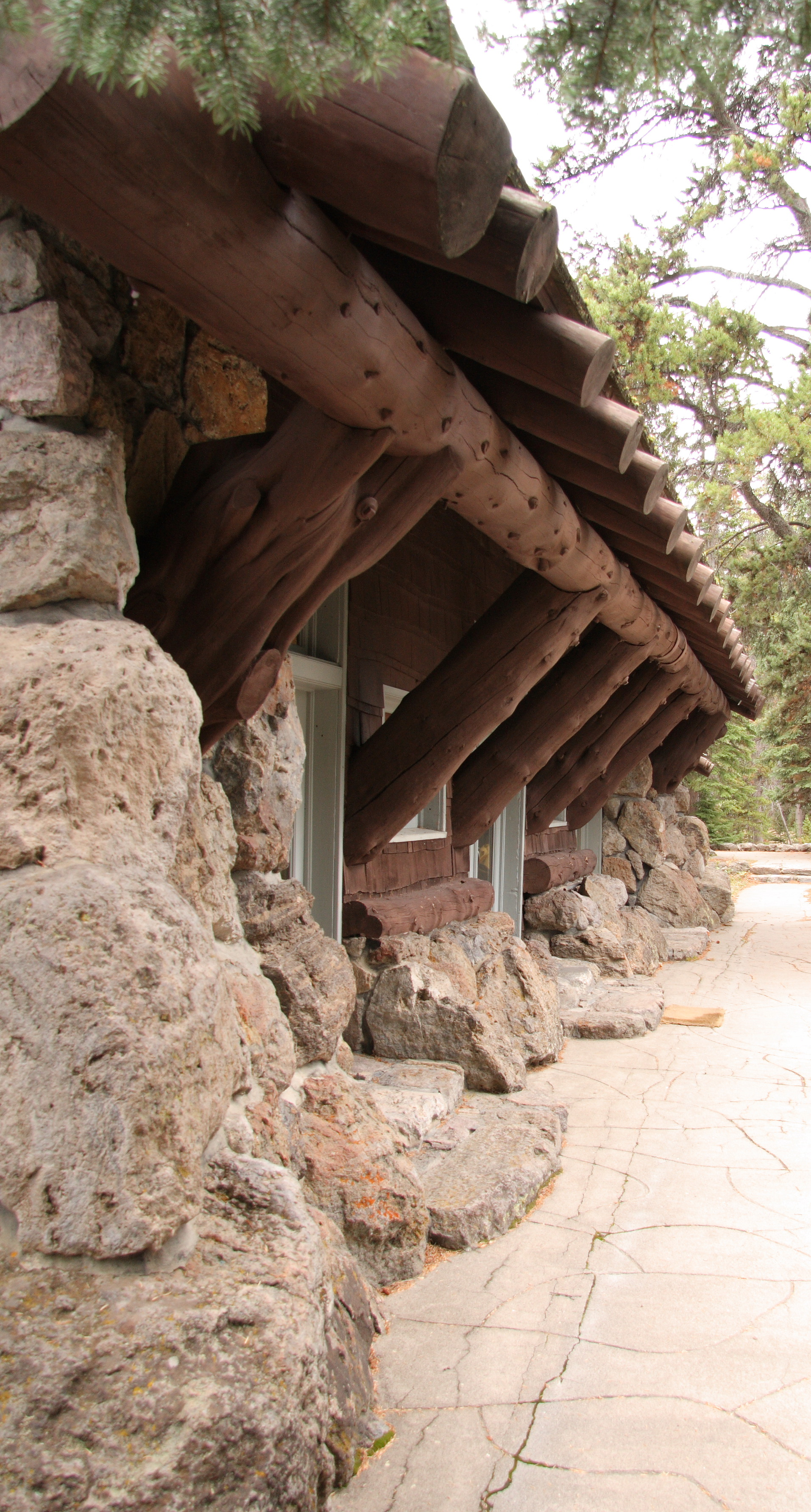
Fishing Bridge Museum at Yellowstone.

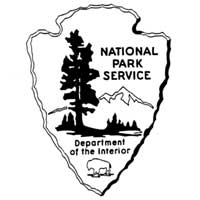
The NPS arrowhead symbol, 1952

Herbert Maier (January 2, 1893 – February 23, 1969) was an American architect and public administrator, most notable as an architect for his work at Yosemite, Grand Canyon and Yellowstone National Parks. Maier, as a consultant to the National Park Service, designed four trailside museums in Yellowstone, three of which survive as National Historic Landmarks. Maier played a significant role in the Park Service's use of the National Park Service Rustic style of architecture in western national parks.

== Architecture ==
Maier was a native of San Francisco and a University of California, Berkeley graduate, who began a collaboration with Ansel F. Hall, a Park Service interpretation specialist, in 1921 by providing Hall with sketches for a museum that Hall had proposed in the Yosemite valley. In 1923, Hall's project was funded by the Laura Spelman Rockefeller Memorial fund, and was completed to Maier's design in collaboration with landscape architect Thomas Chalmers Vint in 1925. This project was followed by an observation station at Yavapai Point on the South Rim of the Grand Canyon in 1928, and the Bear Mountain museum in New York's Palisades Interstate Park the same year. The three projects represented the first examples of park buildings as small museums intended to interpret their surroundings to park visitors.

At Yellowstone, the trailside museums evolved into a system of four buildings, again sponsored by the Laura Spelman Rockefeller Memorial fund. These four museums, opened from 1928 to 1931, interpreted the features found along the park's Grand Loop Road to passing visitors. All four museums employed a distinct style of rustic, natural materials used in a way that promoted an intimacy between the landscape and the structures.

Maier also worked closely with architects Gilbert Stanley Underwood and Mary Jane Colter as well as landscape architect Thomas Vint on planning and architecture for the South Rim complex at Grand Canyon National Park.

== Administration ==
Maier joined the Park Service as an administrator in 1933, where he became less personally involved with individual buildings and more involved in policy. Maier became an assistant regional director and was in a position to influence projects funded through the Park Service. In this way, Maier influenced the design of state park buildings by publishing pattern books based on his own work for use by the Civilian Conservation Corps in state park projects. The CCC buildings at Bastrop State Park in Texas, now a National Historic Landmark district, were designed during this period.

Maier was among the first advocates within the Park Service for a National Seashore at Padre Island, Texas. One of Maier's most significant efforts was the design and standardization of the distinctive Park Service "arrowhead" emblem, created under Maier's guidance and adopted Service-wide in 1952. Near the end of his career, Maier was instrumental in the creation and management of the Mission 66 facilities program.

In 1961, Maier received the Distinguished Service Citation from Interior Secretary Stewart Udall. He retired from the National Park Service in 1962.

== Extant work ==
- Fishing Bridge Museum and Amphitheater, Yellowstone National Park, 1930–31
- Fishing Bridge Naturalist's Residence, Yellowstone National Park, 1930
- Madison Museum, Yellowstone National Park, 1929, NRHP-listed
- Norris Museum, Yellowstone National Park, 1929
- Yavapai Geology Museum, Grand Canyon National Park
- Lodge, Palo Duro Canyon State Park, Texas
- CCC Buildings, Bastrop State Park, Texas
- Refectory, Longhorn Caverns State Park, Texas
- Administration Building, South Mountain Park, Phoenix, Arizona
- Glacier Point Lookout, Yosemite National Park, 1925
- Yosemite Valley Museum, Yosemite National Park, 1926
- Bastrop State Park, east of Bastrop, bet. Texas S.R. 21 & 71, Bastrop, Texas (Maier, Herbert et al.), NRHP-listed
- Norris Museum/Norris Comfort Station, Grand Loop Rd., Yellowstone National Park, Wyoming (Maier, Herbert), NRHP-listed
- Norris, Madison, and Fishing Bridge Museums, Norris Geyser Basin, Madison Junction, and Fishing Bridge, Yellowstone National Park, Wyoming (Maier, Herbert), NRHP-listed
- Work within Yosemite Valley, Yosemite National Park, Yosemite, California (Hunt, M.; Maier, H.; Olmsted, F.L.), NRHP-listed

== Demolished work ==
- Old Faithful Museum of Thermal Activity, demolished 1971

== Death ==
Herbert Maier died on February 23, 1969, in Oakland, California. He was survived by his wife, Susan Eleanore Maier (née Gibson) (1901-2008), and three daughters: Margot M. Young; Phyllis M. Zagone; and Barbara M. Cheatham.
