= Lewis H. Larson =

American archaeologist

Lewis H. Larson Jr. was an American archaeologist who has conducted significant research in Georgia, USA. He worked on the Etowah Mound site in the 1950s and is noted for discovering a pair of marble effigies. Larson also worked on excavations of the Sapelo Island Shell Ring site located off the coast of Georgia. In 1972 he was appointed as Georgia's first State Archaeologist after passing of the National Historic Preservation Act of 1966.

Larson published Aboriginal Subsistence Technology on the Southeastern Coastal Plain during the Late Prehistoric Period in 1980.

A volunteer program at the University of West Georgia's Antonio J. Waring, Jr. Archaeological Laboratory is named after him.
