= Long Swamp Creek =

Body of water in Georgia

Coordinates: 34°19′15.34″N 84°20′19.72″W

Long Swamp Creek is a stream in the U.S. state of Georgia. It is a tributary to the Etowah River.

The English name "Long Swamp Creek" is a translation of its native Indian name. A Native American Indian village, Long Swamp Site, once stood near its mouth.
