= Madison Museum =

- U.S. National Register of Historic Places
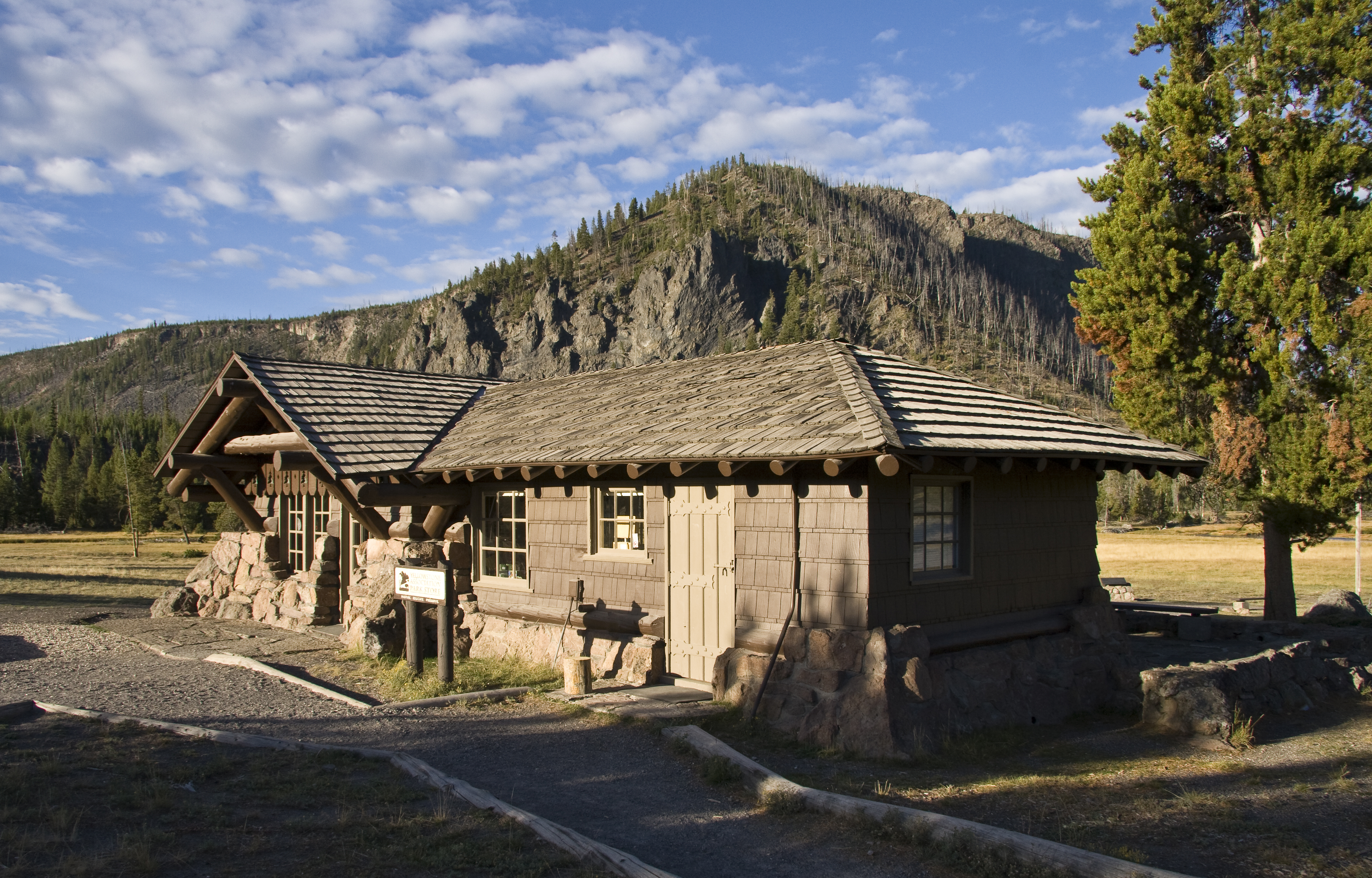
- Madison Museum

- Location within Wyoming Location within the United States
- Location: Madison Junction, Yellowstone National Park, Wyoming
- Coordinates: 44°38′32″N 110°51′43.7″W
- Built: 1929
- Architect: Herbert Maier
- Architectural style: National Park Service Rustic
- MPS: Yellowstone National Park MPS
- NRHP reference No.: 82001720
- Added to NRHP: July 9, 1982

The Madison Museum is one of a series of "trailside museums" in Yellowstone National Park designed by architect Herbert Maier in a style that has become known as National Park Service Rustic. It was listed on the National Register of Historic Places in 1982, and is one of three parts of a 1987-declared National Historic Landmark, the Norris, Madison, and Fishing Bridge Museums. Built in 1929, the Madison Museum is the smallest of the three. It is sited on a small rise that overlooks the meadows and canyon of the Madison River, and still fulfills its function as an informal interpretive center.

== Design ==
The T-shaped structure housed a ranger-naturalist in one wing and a small exhibit area in the other. The building rests on a rhyolite rubble base and is of frame construction, covered with shingles. The transition between stone and frame is marked by a log that serves as a transitional element. The roof is supported by heavy log columns and is itself framed in logs. The building was renovated in 1971 and converted to a single-room layout.

The museum was designed by National Park Service architect Herbert Maier and was funded by a portion of a $118,000 grant from Laura Spelman Rockefeller for educational projects in Yellowstone. Maier was assisted by Carl Parcher Russell, a Park Service field naturalist, and the president of the American Association of Museums, Hermon Carey Bumpus.

== The "Campfire Myth" ==
The Madison site was claimed by Bumpus to be the site where "the Washburn Party, in 1870... resolved that this part of the public domain should be preserved inviolate." The building, neighboring National Park Mountain and the Madison site thus became something of a shrine to the creation of the national park idea. A south-facing window was fitted with a transparency depicting the imagined event, created by local photographer Jack Haynes. Annual re-enactments commemorated the Washburn creation event. By 1960 research by park historian Aubrey Haines made it clear that this "creation myth" was not accurate. The Park Service resisted the new research, putting up signs directing visitors to the Madison "Historic Shrine" and continuing to interpret the area as fundamental to the national park concept. Haines was transferred to another park and retired early. A twenty-year internal debate ended with Haines' vindication and the Madison museum became a visitor information station, stripped of its shrine status.

== See also ==
- Fishing Bridge Museum
- Norris Museum
- Old Faithful Museum of Thermal Activity
