= Old Faithful Museum of Thermal Activity =

Coordinates: 44°27′31.4″N 110°49′45.8″W

The Old Faithful Museum of Thermal Activity was one of a series of four "trailside" museums built in Yellowstone National Park in 1929. Funded by a grant of $118,000 from Laura Spelman Rockefeller, the museums interpreted park features for visitors, and represented an early version of the visitor information center concept that became widespread throughout the National Park Service. The four museums were notable examples of the National Park Service Rustic style, and all were designed by Park Service architect Herbert Maier. The surviving Norris Museum, Fishing Bridge Museum and the Madison Museum are collectively listed as National Historic Landmarks.

The Old Faithful museum, the first of the series, was built at a cost of $8,500 and was completed in 1929. The museum was a low T-shaped single-story structure of rustic log and stone construction. Two stepped sections of roof dominated the main portion of the building with deep overhangs supported by angled log brackets resting on a raised stone foundation sill. A perpendicular wing extended in the direction of the parking lot. The building resembled the Madison and Fishing Bridge museums. The museum's surroundings featured an amphitheater for ranger talks and a small garden of native botanical specimens.

The Old Faithful museum was demolished in 1971 to make way for a full-scale Mission 66 visitor center on the site, midway between the Old Faithful Inn and the Old Faithful Lodge, facing Old Faithful geyser. This visitor center was in turn demolished in 2006 and was replaced by the Old Faithful Visitor Education Center, opened in August 2010.
