= George Wilbanks =

American recruiter and media commentator

- Born: 1958 (age 67–68); Durham, North Carolina
- Education: Williams College, New York University Stern School of Business
- Occupation: Executive recruiter
- Known for: Leadership in ESG and diversity recruiting
- Spouse: Ann Elizabeth Flocken
- Children: 2

George (Rivers) Wilbanks (born 1958) is an American executive recruiter specializing in the asset management and wealth management industries. He has worked in recruiting in the area of ESG and sustainable investing.

Wilbanks is the managing partner of executive search firm Wilbanks Partners, which he founded in 2011.

== Personal life ==
Wilbanks is the son of Evelyn Rivers Wilbanks, an art historian, and Dr. George D. Wilbanks, a cancer researcher and surgeon. He is married to Ann Elizabeth Flocken. They have two children.
