= Norris Geyser Basin Museum =

- Norris Museum/Norris Comfort Station
- U.S. National Register of Historic Places
- U.S. National Historic Landmark
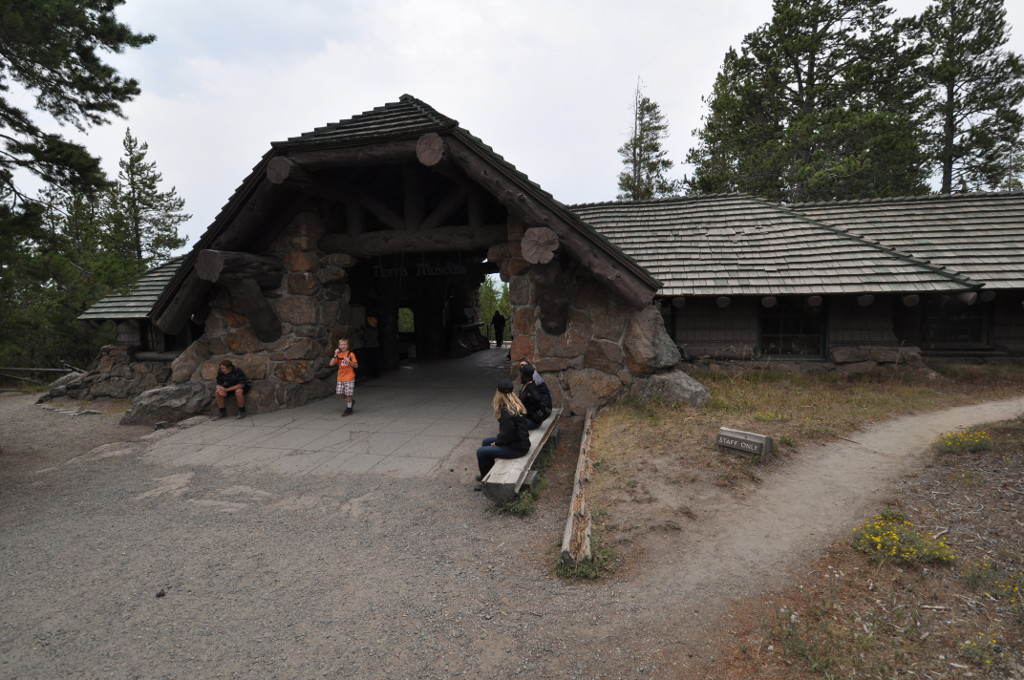
- The Norris Geyser Basin Museum viewed from the south

- Location within Wyoming Location within the United States
- Location: Grand Loop Road, Yellowstone National Park, Wyoming
- Coordinates: 44°43′35″N 110°42′12″W
- Built: 1929–30
- Architect: Herbert Maier
- Architectural style: National Park Service Rustic
- MPS: Yellowstone National Park MPS
- NRHP reference No.: 83003362

Significant dates
- Added to NRHP: July 21, 1983
- Designated NHL: May 28, 1987

The Norris Geyser Basin Museum, also known as Norris Museum, is one of a series of "trailside museums" in Yellowstone National Park designed by architect Herbert Maier in a style that has become known as National Park Service Rustic. It is listed on the National Register of Historic Places, and is one of three parts of a National Historic Landmark, the Norris, Madison, and Fishing Bridge Museums, which were funded by Laura Spelman Rockefeller's grant of $118,000. Built 1929 - 1930, the Norris Museum is sited on a hill between the Porcelain Basin and the Back Basin of Norris Geyser Basin. Its central breezeway frames a view of the Porcelain Basin for arriving visitors.

The 94-foot (29 m) by 20-foot (6.1 m) museum consists of two rectangular sections divided by the breezeway, which is roofed by a prominent jerkinhead gable., framed in massive logs. The pavilions to either side are of shingle-coveredframe construction on a massive stone base. A stone and concrete terrace surrounds the building.

A nearby comfort station is included in the National Register nomination. It was probably built in the 1930s. With the construction of modern restroom facilities the one story log structure is now used as a bookstore operated by the Yellowstone Association.

The museum exhibits focus on geothermal geology, features of Norris Geyser and plant and animal life in thermal areas.

== See also ==
- Fishing Bridge Museum
- Madison Museum
- Old Faithful Museum of Thermal Activity
