= Wilbanks Site =

Archaeological site in Georgia, US

- Periods: Late Mississippian period
- Cultures: Mississippian culture
- Location: Cartersville, Georgia, Cherokee County, Georgia, US
- Region: Cherokee County, Georgia

Site notes
- Architectural style: platform mound
- Excavation dates: 1948

The Wilbanks Site (9CK5) is a Late Mississippian culture Native American archaeological site in Cherokee County, Georgia, United States. The site was located about midway between the towns of Cartersville, Georgia to the west, and Canton, Georgia to the east. It was on the south bank of the Etowah River, but is now submerged underneath Lake Allatoona, under roughly 80–90 feet of water.

== Excavation ==
The site was dug in poor weather in November and December 1948, preceding the impending flood waters of the reservoir. The Department of Anthropology at the University of Georgia, under the direction of William H. Sears conducted the excavation, and Sears wrote a site report as part of the Bureau of American Ethnology's River Basin Survey project. According to Sears's survey, at the site's population peak, the area of occupation would have been a village of approximately eighty acres. The site was dominated by one large mound, approximately 220 feet in diameter and six feet tall which was only a few yards from the original riverbank. This mound, as was typical of middle 20th century reservoir archaeology, was the focus of the excavation. Sears's was desirous of finding more "Southeastern Cult" artifacts, of the type excavated at Etowah, in a tight archaeological context. His hopes were not realized, but the site did yield more information about the Southeast's ceramic sequence and the Etowah culture's ceremonial structures. There were also several middens nearby which were unearthed and excavated. Sears noted that the site was used by three distinct cultures at different times, but was dominated by the early Etowah culture. The other two cultures which were present at the site were the Wilbanks and Lamar cultures. It is the type-site for the Wilbanks cultural period. These culture groups were distinguished by differing ceramic styles. All three cultural occupations, however, fall within the "Late Mississippian" time period.

== Earth lodge controversy ==
There is some controversy over the interpretation of the mound structure which dominated the site. Sears, in his initial report, stated that he believed the mound to be a collapsed earth lodge analogous to the type found at the Macon Plateau site. He supported this claim by describing his discovery of horizontal molds of poles ranging in diameter from 4 to 6 inches and rocks scattered about the floor of the site underneath a layer of clay. He concluded that these had been rafters supporting a sod or earthen roof. He then speculated as to the method of construction which had been used to make such an "earth lodge" discussing the use of much wider support beams, a ridge pole, further rafters, and finally presenting a pen & ink artist's rendering of how he believed the site would have appeared in cross section. Lewis Larson in his "The Case for Earth Lodges in the Southeast" disputes Sear's claims. Larson hypothesizes that the mound at the Wilbanks site was not an earth lodge, but simply some sort of ceremonial mound, and that Sears misinterpreted the excavation. The absence of large support beam, ridge poles, or a hearth in Sears's report indicated to Larson that the structure excavated was not an earth lodge. Larson also noted that the absence of platform or bench seating made of either timber or clay also indicated that there was most likely not an earth lodge present at the Wilbanks site. Finally, the overall rarity of earth lodges in the Southeast and the seemingly general insignificance of the site in the region also points, in Larson's opinion, to an error in the interpretation of the site as an earth lodge.

== See also ==
- List of Mississippian sites
- Etowah Mounds
- Long Swamp Site
- Pisgah phase
