= Mandeville site =

Mississippian culture

- Location within Georgia today
- 31°46′9.08″N 85°7′0.91″W
- Cultures: Deptford culture, Middle Woodland, South Appalachian Mississippian culture
- Location: Clay County, Georgia, US
- Region: Clay County, Georgia

Site notes
- Architectural style: platform mound
- Excavation dates: 1950
- Archaeologists: Clarence Bloomfield Moore

The Mandeville site (9CY1) is an archaeological site in Clay County in southwest Georgia in the United States. The site now lies under the Walter F. George Reservoir, which is a part of the Chattahoochee River basin.

== History ==
The first occupations of the site were a village settlement during the Deptford period. Occupation of the site and the construction of two mounds continue into the Middle Woodland period. Ceramic evidence also dates occupation to the Early Swift Creek culture. The final layer of Mound A indicates it was converted to a platform mound typical of the Mississippian period.

== Excavations ==
The site was first visited by Clarence B. Moore at the turn of the century. He tested the site but did not conduct any excavations due to negative results. The site was visited by a field party from the University of Georgia in 1950. Some minor surface excavations were conducted. Thorough excavations on the site were conducted during 1959-1960 by Arthur Kelly, James H. Kellar and Edward V. McMichael before construction of the dam. The site is no longer accessible for excavation.

== Site description ==
The site contains two mounds, a flat top mound (Mound A), and one large dome shaped burial mound (Mound B). Mound A is about 240 feet (73 m) by 170 feet (52 m) and about 14 feet (4.3 m) in height. Mound B is about 140 feet (43 m) by 80 feet (24 m). There is also a village situated between the two mounds approximately 40 acres (0.16 km^{2}) in area. A pre-mound village occupation, dated to the Deptford period exists beneath Mound A. Evidence for small circular houses and pits were found dated to this time. The first layers of Mound construction are attributed to the Late Deptford Period, with subsequent cultures building upon the original. The site was abandoned during the Woodland Period and re-inhabited about 500 years later during the Mississippian Period.

== Artifacts ==
The most significant artifacts at the Mandeville site consist of ceramics, including vessels and potsherds. Bone tools and projectile points were also found, along with flake knives. Fragments from a ceramic figurine were found, including the head and two torso fragments.

== See also ==
- List of Mississippian sites
- Dyar site
- Roods Landing site
