= Fishing Bridge Museum =

- U.S. National Historic Landmark District – Contributing property
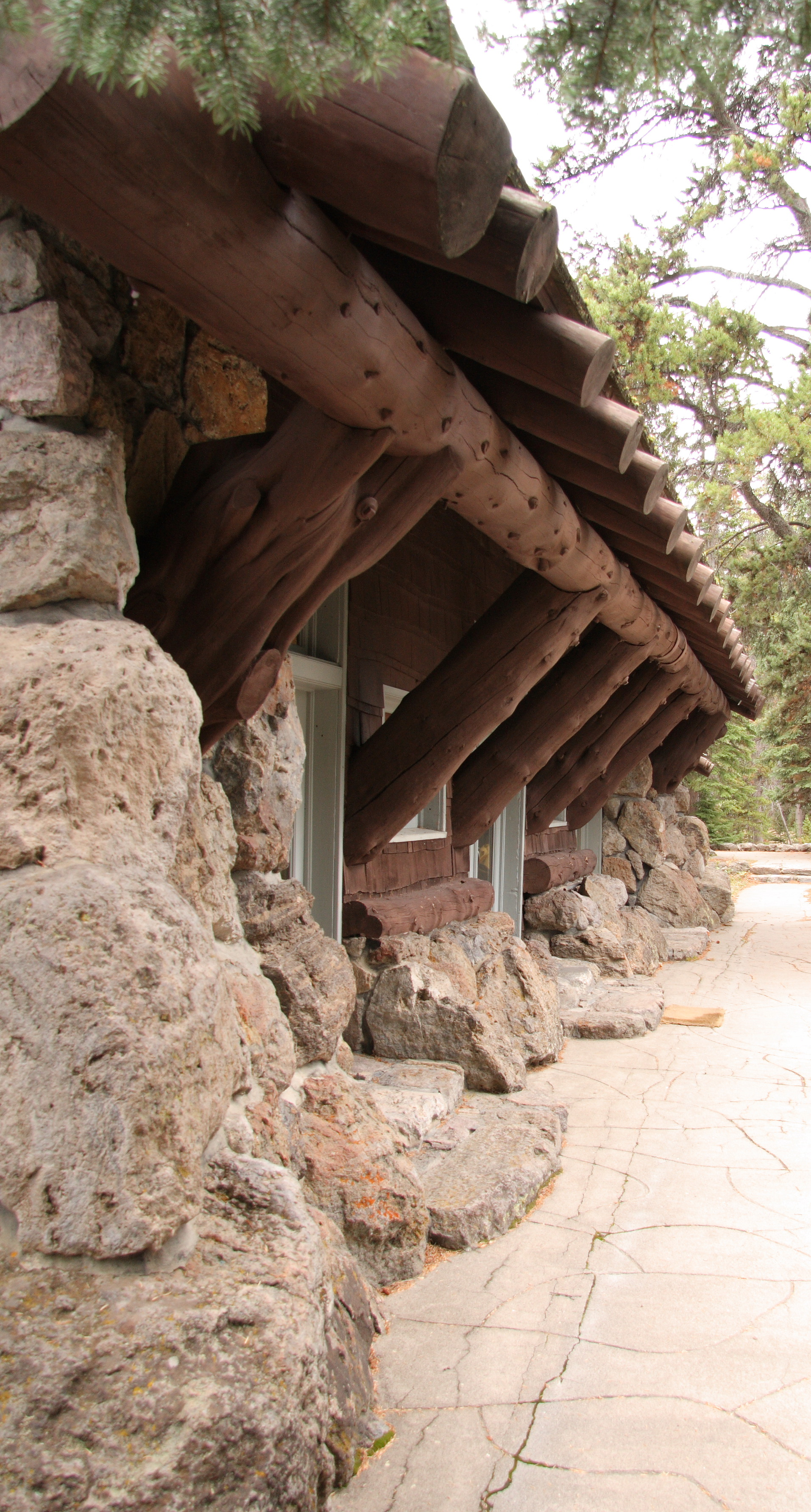
- Fishing Bridge Museum

- Location within Wyoming Location within the United States
- Location: Norris Geyser Basin, Madison Junction, and Fishing Bridge, Yellowstone National Park, Wyoming
- Coordinates: 44.563028°N 110.377694°W
- Built: 1929
- Architect: Herbert Maier
- Part of: Norris, Madison, and Fishing Bridge Museums (ID87001445)

Significant dates
- Added to NRHP: May 28, 1987
- Designated NHLDCP: May 28, 1987

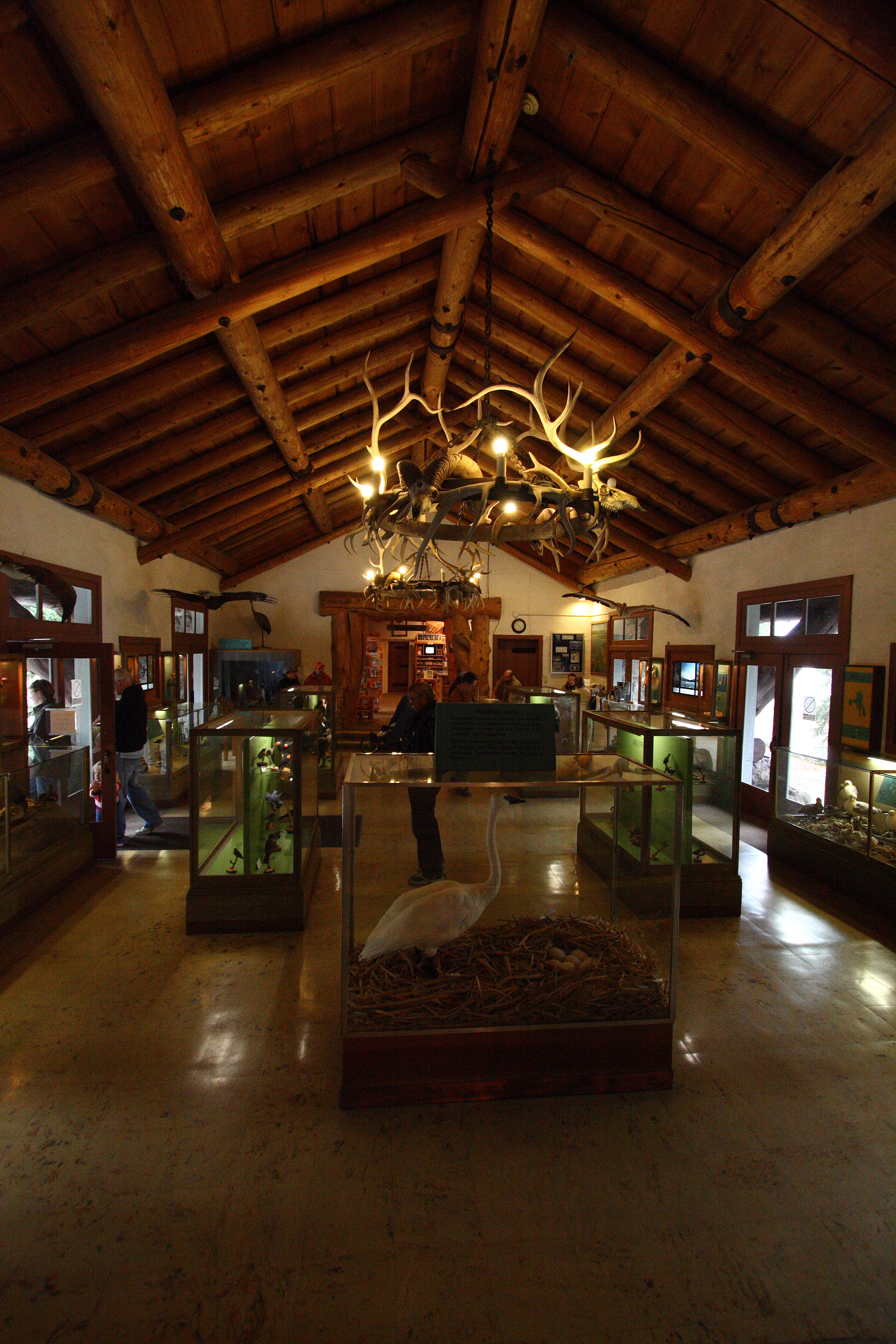
Interior view of the Fishing Bridge Museum

The Fishing Bridge Museum is one of a series of "trailside museums" in Yellowstone National Park, Wyoming, United States, designed by architect Herbert Maier in a style that has become known as National Park Service Rustic. It is one of three parts of a 1987-declared National Historic Landmark, the Norris, Madison, and Fishing Bridge Museums. It was not listed separately on the National Register of Historic Places as the other two were. Built in 1931, the Fishing Bridge Museum is the largest in the series, and is used as a small visitor center. The museum displays stuffed mounts of birds and animals found in Yellowstone Park.

== See also ==
- Madison Museum
- Norris Museum
- Old Faithful Museum of Thermal Activity
