= Etowah Indian Mounds =

Archaeological site in Georgia, US

- Etowah Mounds
- U.S. National Register of Historic Places
- U.S. National Historic Landmark
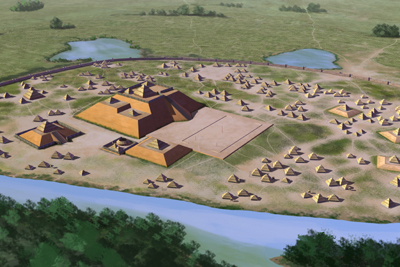
- Artist's conception of Etowah

- Location within Metro Atlanta Location within Georgia Location within the United States
- Nearest city: Cartersville, GA
- Coordinates: 34°7′30.47″N 84°48′27.59″W
- NRHP reference No.: 66000272

Significant dates
- Added to NRHP: October 15, 1966
- Designated NHL: July 19, 1964

Etowah Indian Mounds (9BR1) are a 54-acre (220,000 m^{2}) archaeological site in Bartow County, Georgia, south of Cartersville. Built and occupied in three phases, from 1000–1550 CE, the prehistoric site is located on the north shore of the Etowah River.

Etowah Indian Mounds Historic Site is a designated National Historic Landmark, managed by the Georgia Department of Natural Resources. It is considered "the most intact Mississippian culture site in the Southeast", according to Georgia State Parks and Historic Sites. Both the historic Muscogee Creek and the Cherokee peoples, who each occupied this area at varying times, hold the site to be sacred.

== History ==
This site was professionally excavated beginning in the early 20th century. Additional studies have been undertaken as more evidence and knowledge has accumulated about the succession of cultures in this area, aided by modern technology such as radio carbon dating and magnetometers.

Late 20th-century studies showed the mounds were built and occupied by prehistoric indigenous peoples of the South Appalachian Mississippian culture (a regional variation of the Mississippian culture) of eastern North America. They were ancestors of the historic Muskogean language-speaking Muscogee Creek people who later emerged in this area.

Etowah is a Muskogee word derived from italwa, meaning "town". From 1000–1550 CE, during the Mississippian culture era, Etowah was occupied by a series of cycling chiefdoms (see Coosa confederacy) over the course of five and a half centuries. The Hernando de Soto expedition encountered a settlement called Itaba between Coosa and Ulibahali, which was likely Etowah. The historic Muscogee Creek formed in this region and occupied this area. They were later pushed out by the Cherokee, who migrated from eastern Georgia and Tennessee to evade European-American pressure.

In the 19th century, European-American settlers mistakenly believed that the mounds had been built by the historic Cherokee, who occupied the region at the time. But many researchers now believe that because the Iroquoian-speaking tribe did not reach this part of Georgia until the late 18th century, they could not have built the mounds. The earthworks have been dated to much earlier periods.

In the 21st century, the federally recognized Muscogee (Creek) Nation, now based in Oklahoma, and the Poarch Band of Creek Indians of Alabama both consider Italwa to be their most important ancestral town. The Cherokee also revere it.

=== Site chronology ===
Tykeon Wilkes used changes in ceramic styles across multiple sites in the Etowah River Valley to determine timelines for the region. The ceramics found at Etowah and other regional sites have been reconstructed and allow Etowah to be placed into the following sequences. The town was occupied in three distinct archaeological phases: c. 1000–1200 CE, c. 1250–1375 CE, and c. 1375–1550 CE. It was at its peak from c. 1325–1375 CE.

Period	Regional periods	Dates	Etowah Site Phases	Ceramic markers
Early Mississippian	Etowah Phase	1000–1100 CE	Early Etowah	ladder base diamond predominant motif, shell tempering more common
Early Mississippian	Etowah Phase	1100–1200 CE	Late Etowah	2-bar diamond motif more prevalent, grit tempering more common, filfot cross, Etowah Incised and Hiwassee Island red on buff first appear
Middle Mississippian	Savannah Phase	1200–1250 CE	Unoccupied	no inhabited sites along Etowah river valley
Middle Mississippian	Savannah Phase	1250–1325 CE	Early Wilbanks	coarse grit temper commonest, pottery thicker, bolder and with sloppier, complicated, stamped designs
Middle Mississippian	Savannah Phase	1325–1375 CE	Late Wilbanks	thinner pottery, more finely done stamping, minority vessel forms and designs appear, Rudder Comb Incised, Dallas Incised, Pisgah-like and Lake Jackson decorated
Late Mississippian	Lamar phase	1375–1425 CE	Stamp Creek	lack of Lamar Incised, rim modifications appear,
Late Mississippian	Lamar phase	1425–1475 CE	Mayes(provisional)	wider rims than previous phase, boldly executed 3-line incised designs
Late Mississippian	Lamar phase	1475–1550 CE	Brewster	narrower incised lines, stamping sloppy with most motifs no longer distinguishable, rectilinear designs common, Brewster and Barnett are temporally equivalent and are more of a geographic distinction in the valley
Late Mississippian	Lamar phase	1500–1625 CE	Barnett	higher percentage of shell tempering than Brewster with types such as Dallas Plain, Dallas Incised and Dallas Filleted

== Site description ==
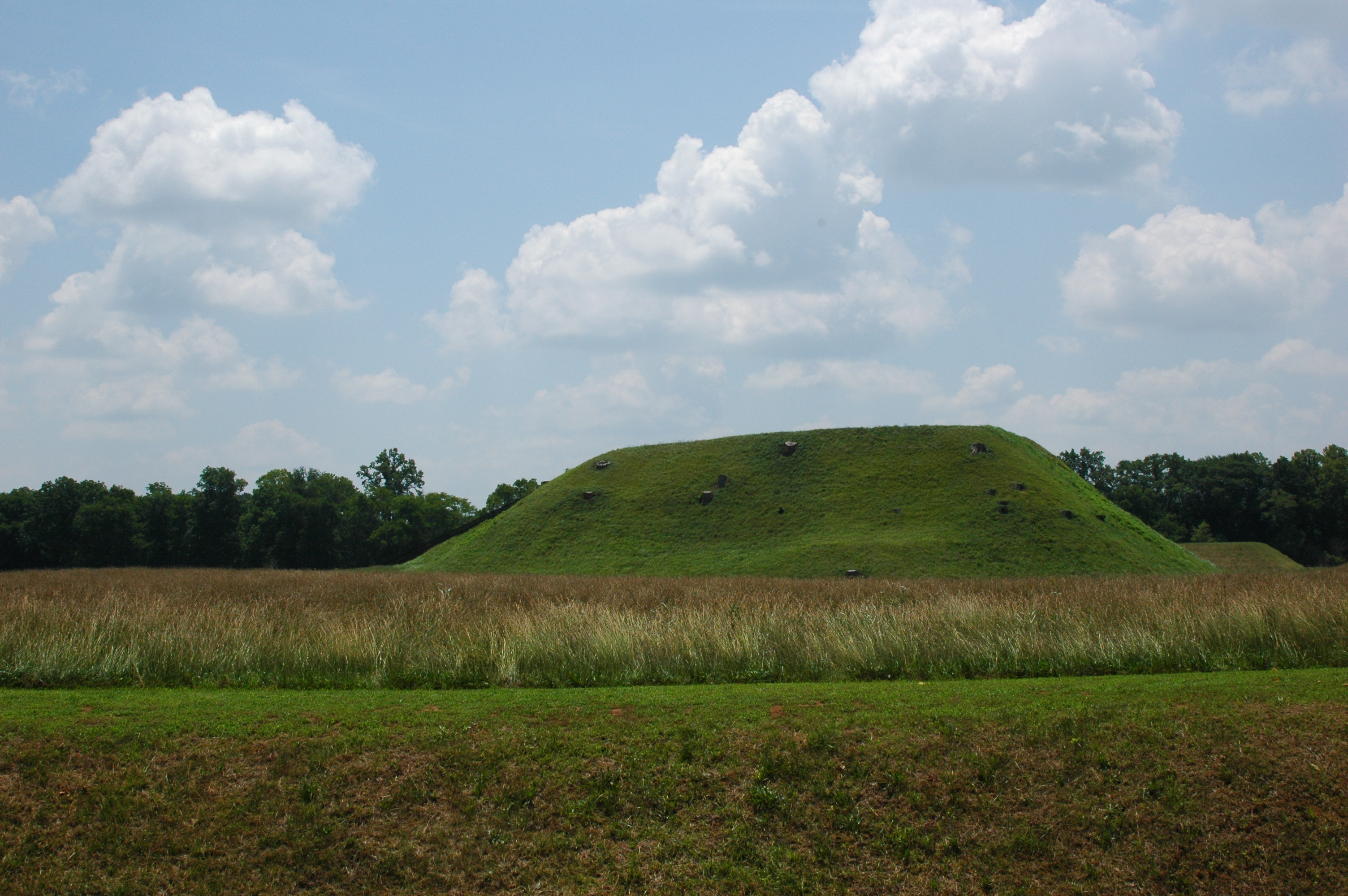
Chief Mound (Mound A)

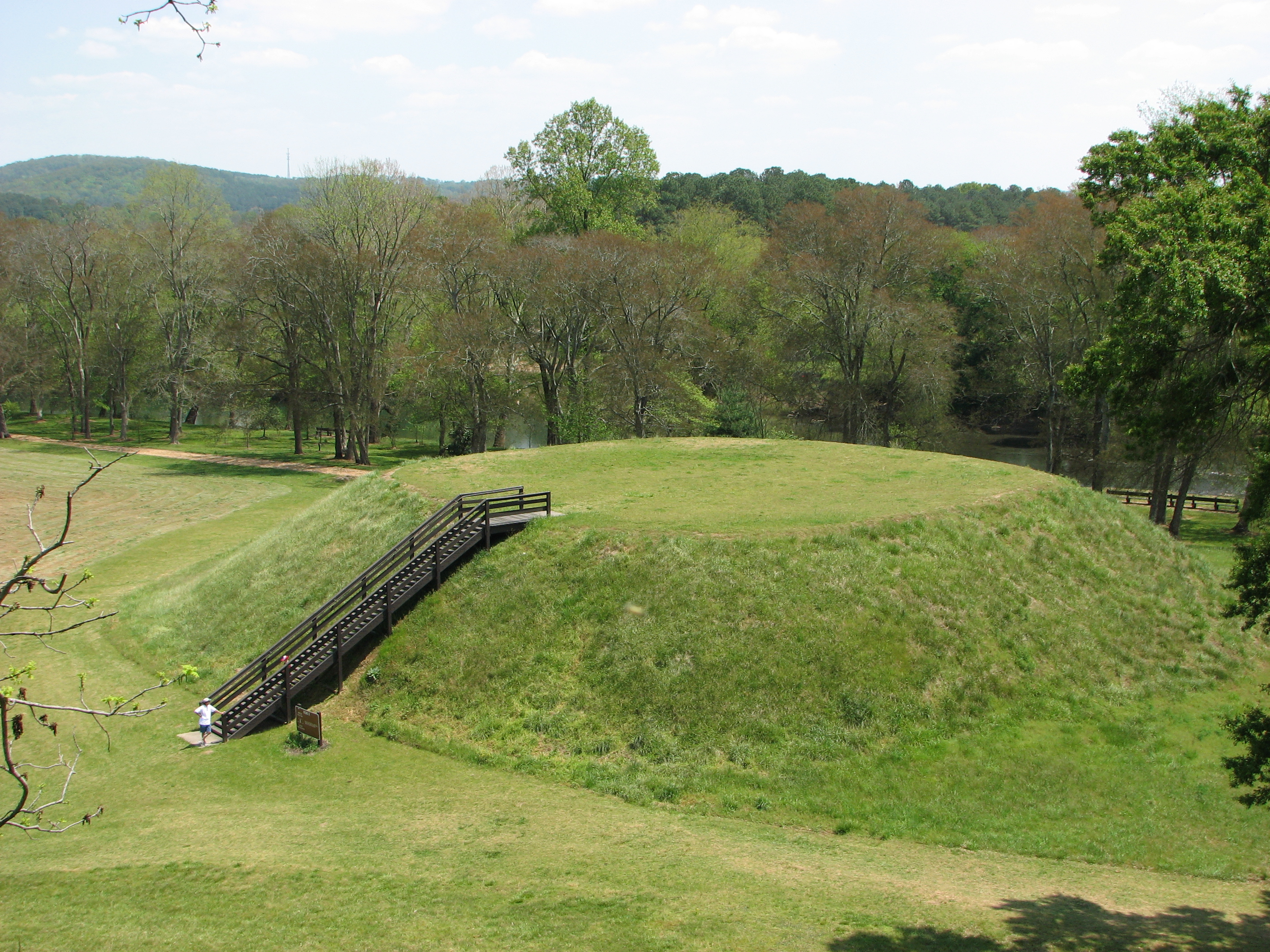
Mound B, seen from Mound A

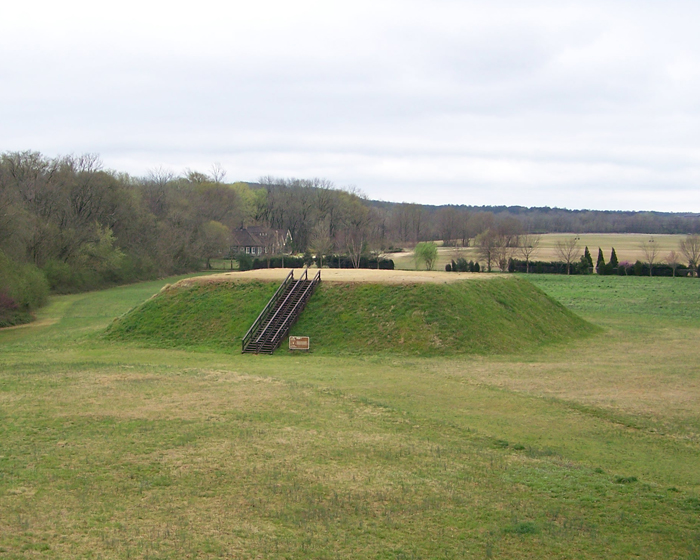
Mound C

Etowah has three main platform mounds and three lesser mounds. The Temple Mound, Mound A, is 63 feet (19 m) high, taller than a six-story building, and covers 3 acres (12,000 m^{2}) at its base. In 2005–2008 ground mapping with magnetometers revealed new information and data, showing that the site was much more complex than had previously been believed.

The study team has identified a total of 140 buildings on the site. In addition, Mound A was found to have had four major structures and a courtyard during the height of the community's power. Mound B is 25 feet (7.6 m) high; Mound C, which rises 10 feet (3.0 m), is the only one to have been completely excavated. Magnetometers enabled archaeologists to determine the location of temples of log and thatch, which were originally built on the summits of the mounds. Adjacent to the mounds is a raised, level, ceremonial plaza, which was constructed to be used for ceremonies, stickball and chunkey games, and as a bazaar for trade goods.

When visiting the Etowah Mounds, guests can view the "borrow pits" (which archaeologists at one time thought were moats), where workers dug earth to construct the three large mounds in the center of the park.

Older pottery found on the site suggest that there was an earlier village (c. 200 BCE–600 CE) associated with the Swift Creek culture. This earlier Middle Woodland period occupation at Etowah may have been related to the major Swift Creek center of Leake Mounds, approximately two miles downstream (west) of Etowah.

Many archaeologists believe that Etowah battled for hegemony over the Alabama River basin with Moundville, another Mississippian polity in present-day Alabama. Etowah was protected by a semicircular fortification system. An outer band formed by nut tree orchards prevented enemy armies from shooting masses of flaming arrows into the town. A 9 feet (2.7 m) to 10 feet (3.0 m)-deep moat blocked direct contact by the enemy with the palisaded walls. It also functioned as a drainage system during major floods, common for centuries, from this period and into the 20th century. Workers formed the palisade by setting upright 12 feet (3.7 m) high logs into a ditch approximately 12 inches (300 mm) on center. They back-filled around the timbers to form a levee. Guard towers for archers were spaced approximately 80 feet (24 m) apart.

=== Artifacts ===
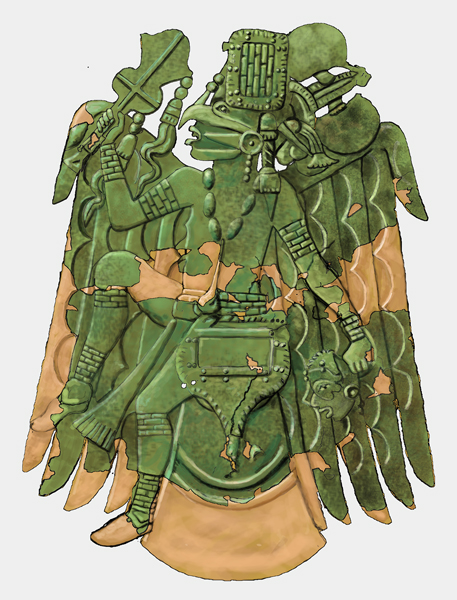
Illustration of a Rogan Plate (Catalogue No. A91117, Department of Anthropology, NMNH, Smithsonian), a repoussé copper plate falcon dancer found at Etowah, but believed to have been fabricated at Cahokia in the 13th century

The artifacts discovered in burials within the Etowah site indicate that its residents developed an artistically and technically advanced culture. Numerous copper tools, weapons and ornamental copper plates accompanied the burials of members of Etowah's elite class. Where proximity to copper protected textile fibers from degeneration, archaeologists also found brightly colored cloth with ornate patterns. These were the remnants of the clothing of social elites.

Numerous clay figurines and ten Mississippian stone statues have been found through the years in the vicinity of Etowah. Many are paired statues, which portray a man sitting cross-legged and a woman kneeling. The female figures wear wrap-around skirts and males are usually portrayed without visible clothing, although both usually have elaborate hairstyles. The pair are thought to represent lineage ancestors. Individual statues of young women also show them kneeling, but with additional characteristics such as visible sex organs, which are not visible on the paired statues. This female figure is thought to represent a fertility or Earth Mother goddess. The birdman, hand in eye, solar cross, and other symbols associated with the Southeastern Ceremonial Complex appear in many artifacts found at Etowah.

=== Trade ===
The Etowah River is a tributary of the Coosa and Alabama rivers, and forms the border between the southern edge of the Ridge and Valley Appalachians and the Piedmont Plateau. Trade and tribute brought whelk shells from the Gulf of Mexico; copper, mica and flint from the Cumberland Plateau; and "galena, graphite, and an array of ochers to provide pigment for painting buildings, bodies, and works of art; greenstone and marble to furnish raw material for tools, weapons and ritual objects" from the Piedmont. The loamy riverbed soil could be easily tilled with digging sticks and stone and shell hoes. Its fertility was annually renewed by the river's floods. Free of frost most of the year, the land yielded rich harvests of corn, beans, and squash, traditional crops of the indigenous peoples.

=== Habitat ===
Chestnut, walnut, hickory, and persimmon trees that grew in upland forests provided nuts and fruit for both the people of Etowah and the white-tailed deer, wild turkey, and smaller game they hunted. Other plants that were gathered include stinging nettle and red mulberry. A native holly was gathered whose leaves and stems were brewed into the Black drink imbibed in ritual purification ceremonies. River cane grew in dense thickets and was made into arrow shafts, thatching for roofs, and splits for weaving baskets, benches, and mats for walls and floors.

River shoals abounded in freshwater mussels and turtles. The Mississippians built v-shaped rock weirs to pen and channel catfish, drum and gar, which they caught in rivercane baskets. Researchers have found remains of more than 100 rock weirs along the Etowah River. One has been restored within the grounds of the historic site.

== Post-contact ==
Archaeological research on the subject is not conclusive, but the Etowah site may be the same as a village of a similar name visited by Spanish conquistador Hernando de Soto in 1540. The chroniclers of the de Soto Expedition made no mention of any large mounds in their record of visiting a town named Itaba, though historian Dr. Marvin T. Smith suggests that the mounds which were likely overgrown and unmaintained by the time of the expedition may simply not have attracted the attention of Spanish explorers. Itaba means "boundary" or trail crossing in the Alabama language. The English name for the mounds, Etowah, was derived from an archaic Muscogee place name, Italwa. Italwa probably originally referred to the solar cross symbol. In the modern Muskogee language it means "town."

Until studies of the late 20th century were published, most European-American people in Georgia believed Etowah to have been built by the well-known historic Cherokee. But, the Cherokee did not arrive in this part of Georgia until the late 18th century, two to seven centuries after the mounds were constructed. Most scholars believe that the mound complex was likely built by people of the South Appalachian Mississippian culture. They are considered ancestral to the historic Muscogee, long known as the Creek people. Most of the peoples of the Creek Confederacy were removed to Indian Territory in the 1830s.

Since that time, the Creek descendants have formed two federally recognized tribes: the largest is the Muscogee (Creek) Nation in Oklahoma; the Poarch Band of Creek Indians in Alabama is the only federally recognized tribe in the state. Both consider Italwa, or Etowah, to be their most important ancestral town. The official title of the Creek Nation's Principal Chief is Italwa Mikko (the Muskogee word for chief is miko). A new, large-scale model of Italwa is on permanent display in the rotunda of the Muskogee (Creek) Capitol in Okmulgee, Oklahoma.

== History of excavation and studies ==
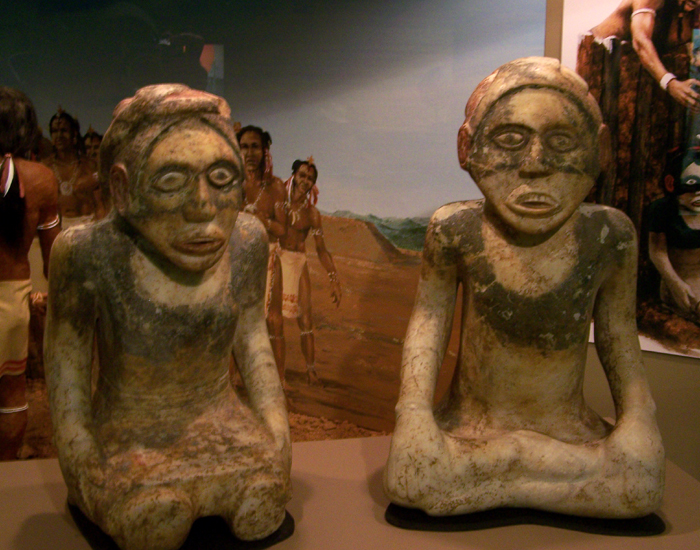
Marble effigies from the Etowah Mound C, c. 1250–1375: kneeling woman on left, and man on right

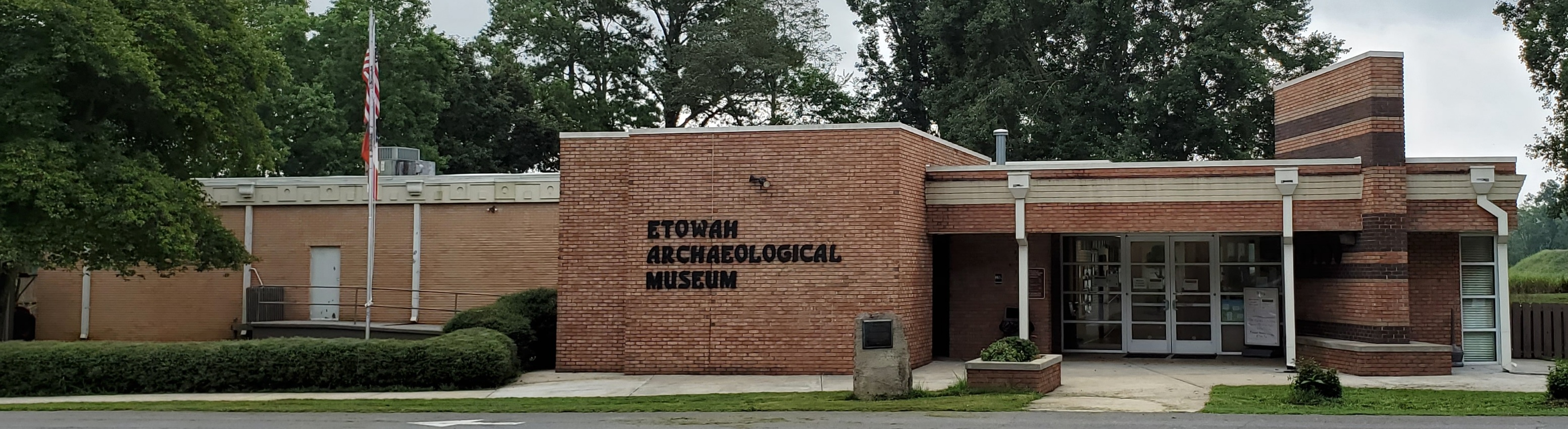
Etowah Archaeological Museum, located at the site

Missionary Elias Cornelius visited the site in 1817 and described it in his journal published by Bela Bates Edwards in 1833. He realized a mound must have been over two hundred years old, due to the size of trees growing on it, but had little idea of its real history. Cyrus Thomas and John P. Rogan tested the site in 1883 for the Smithsonian Institution, which was conducting a survey of recognized mound sites.

The first well-documented archaeological inquiry at the site did not begin until the winter of 1925, conducted by Warren K. Moorehead. His excavations into Mound C at the site revealed a rich array of Mississippian culture burial goods. These artifacts, along with the collections from Cahokia, Moundville site, Lake Jackson Mounds, and Spiro Mounds, would comprise the majority of the materials which archaeologists used to define the Southeastern Ceremonial Complex (SECC). The professional excavation of this enormous burial mound contributed major research impetus to the study of Mississippian artifacts and peoples. It greatly increased the understanding of pre-Contact Native American artwork.

Arthur R. Kelly, founding chairman of the Department of Anthropology at the University of Georgia, also conducted professional excavations and studies at Etowah Mounds, prior to planned flood control projects in the area. In 1947, the government built the Allatoona Dam upstream for flood control. The Etowah site was designated as a National Historic Landmark in 1964.

The Etowah Indian Mounds museum displays artifacts found at the site, including Mississippian culture pottery, monolithic stone axes, Mississippian stone statuary, copper jewelry, shell gorgets, and other artifacts. In 2022, many of the artifacts were returned to the Muscogee Creek nation in response to the Native American Graves Protection and Repatriation Act. They were all funeral-based artifacts.

== Gallery ==
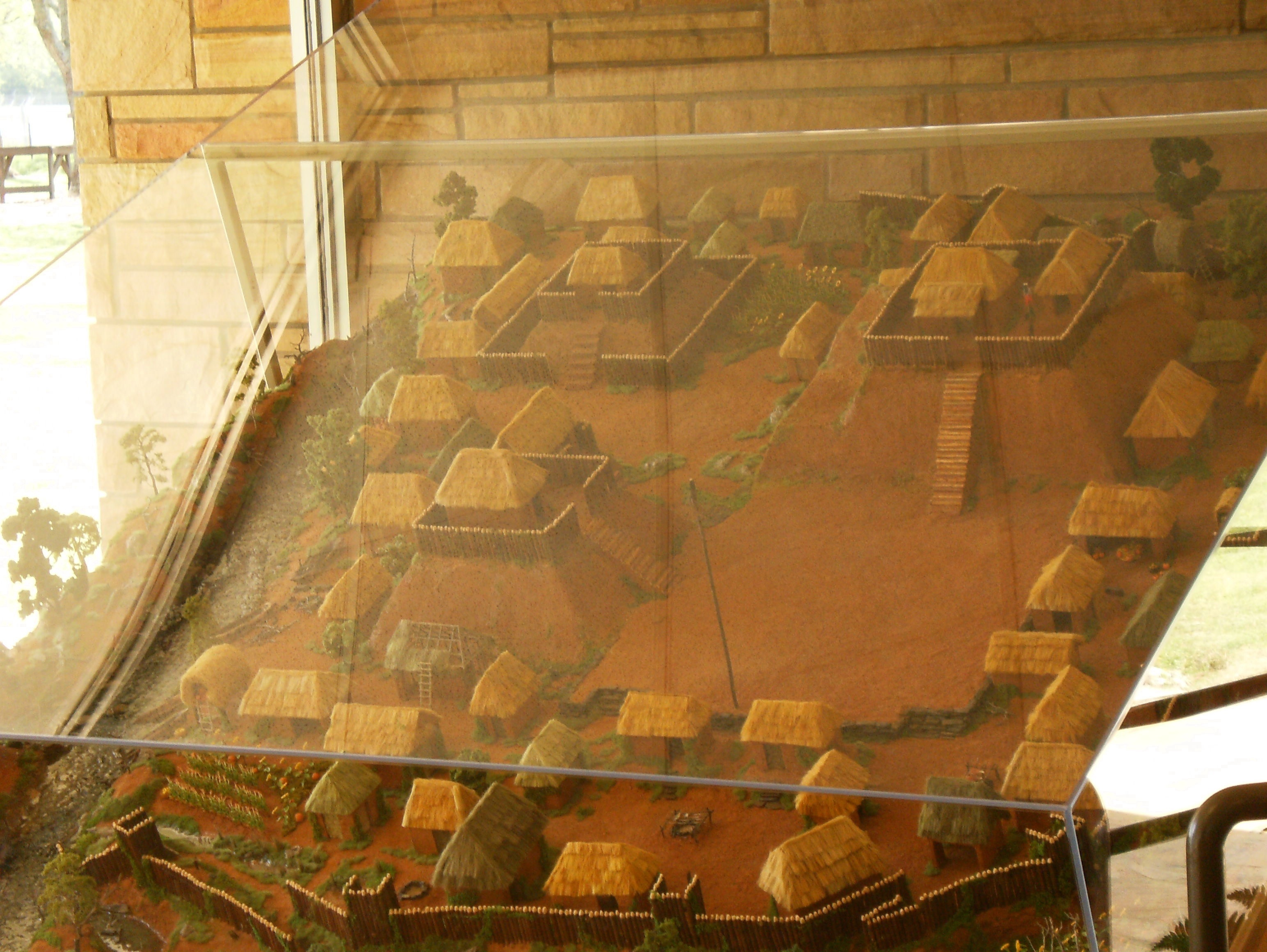
Model of Etowah at its height

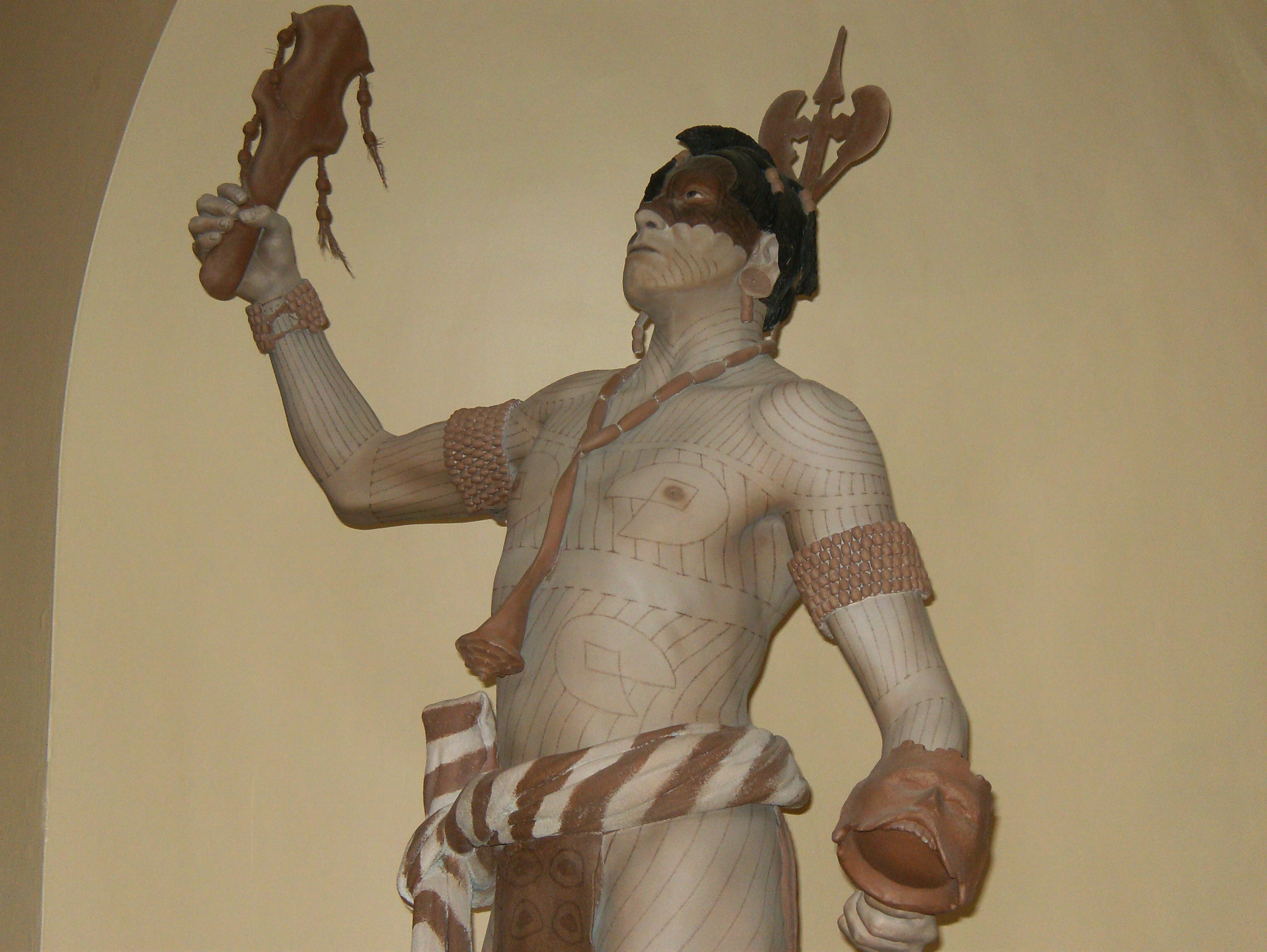
Statue of Etowah chief, Georgia State Capitol, based on archaeological findings and the descriptions of early European explorers

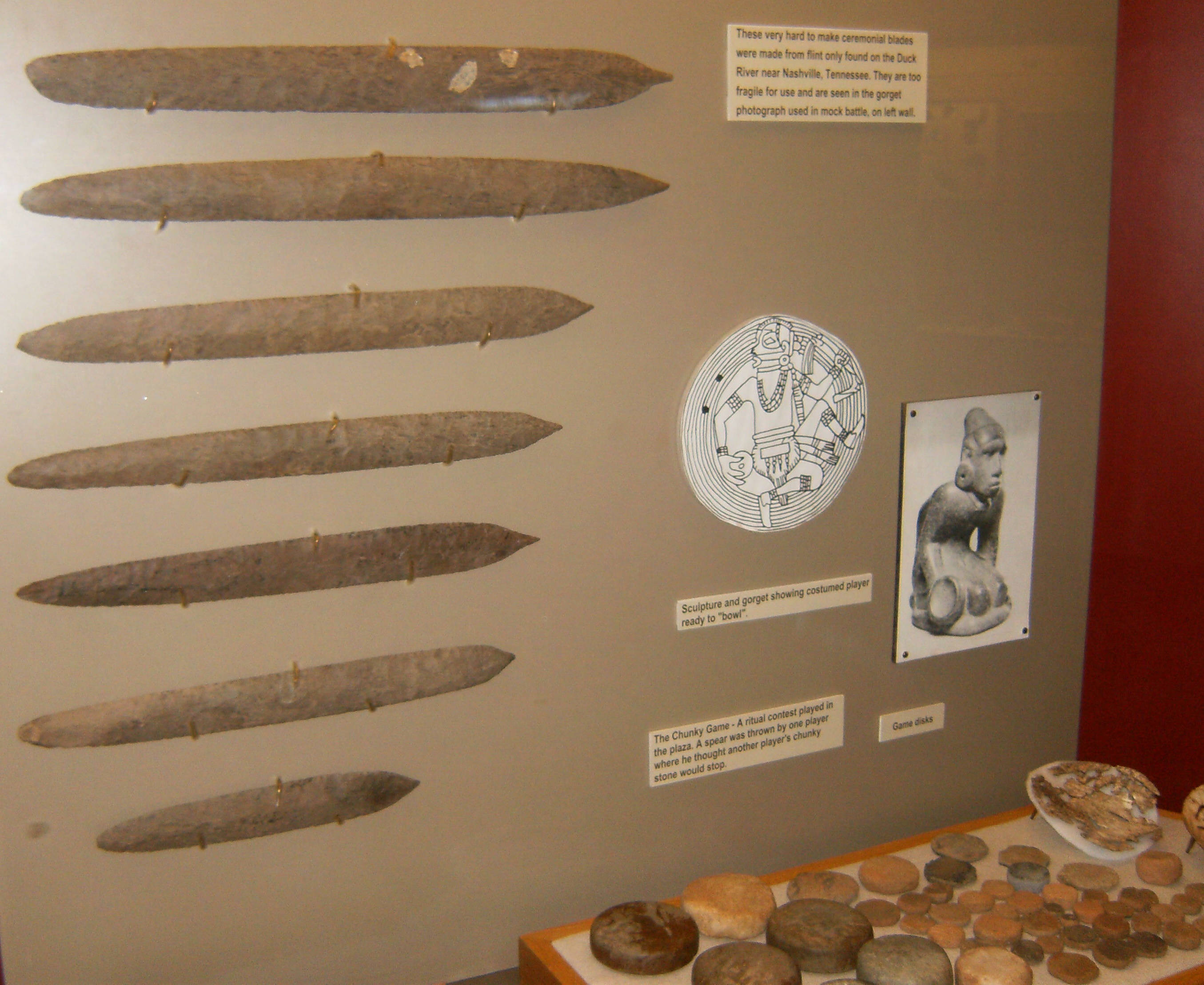
Ceremonial flint blades and chunkey stones

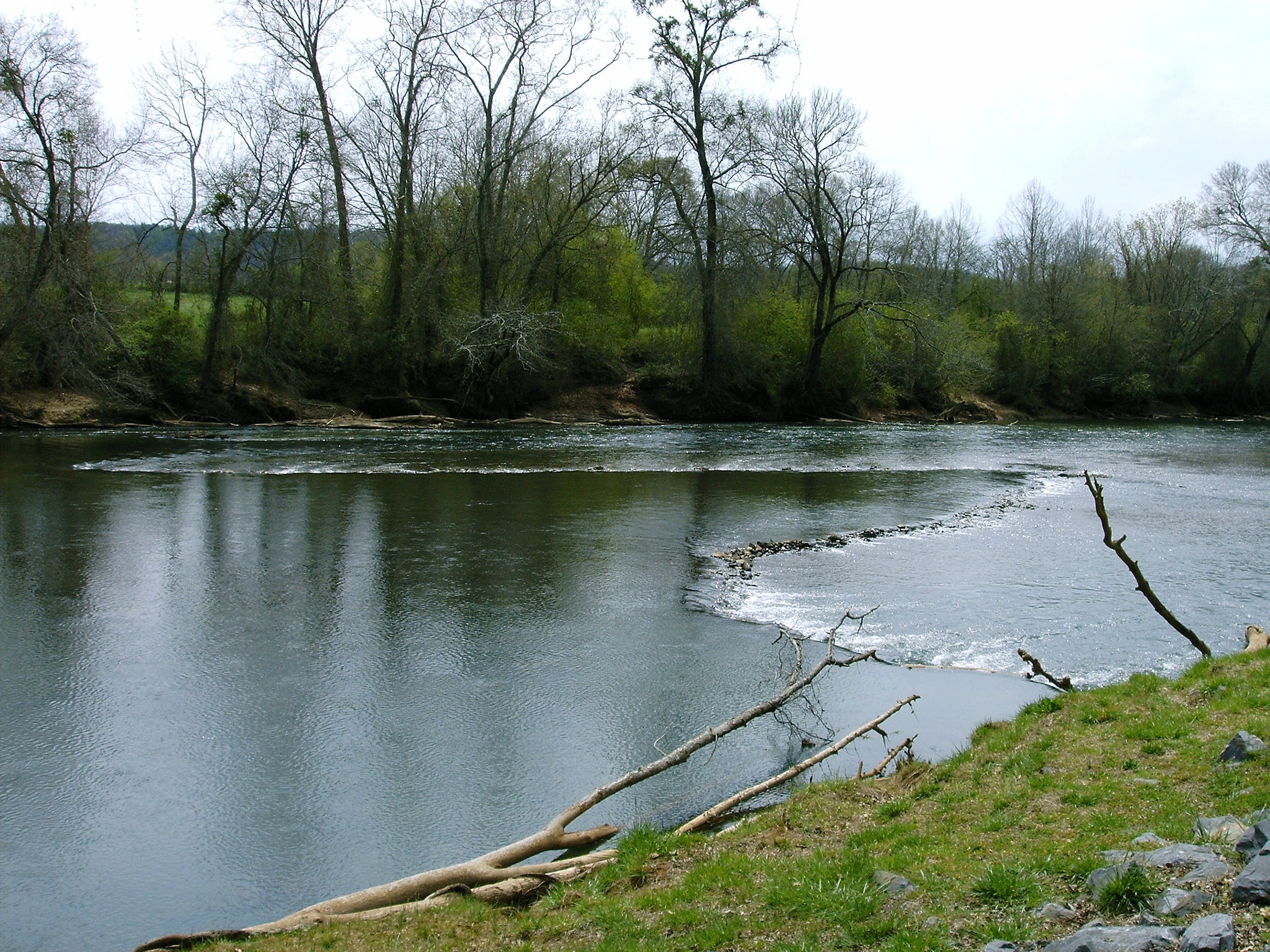
Rock fishing weir constructed on the Etowah River

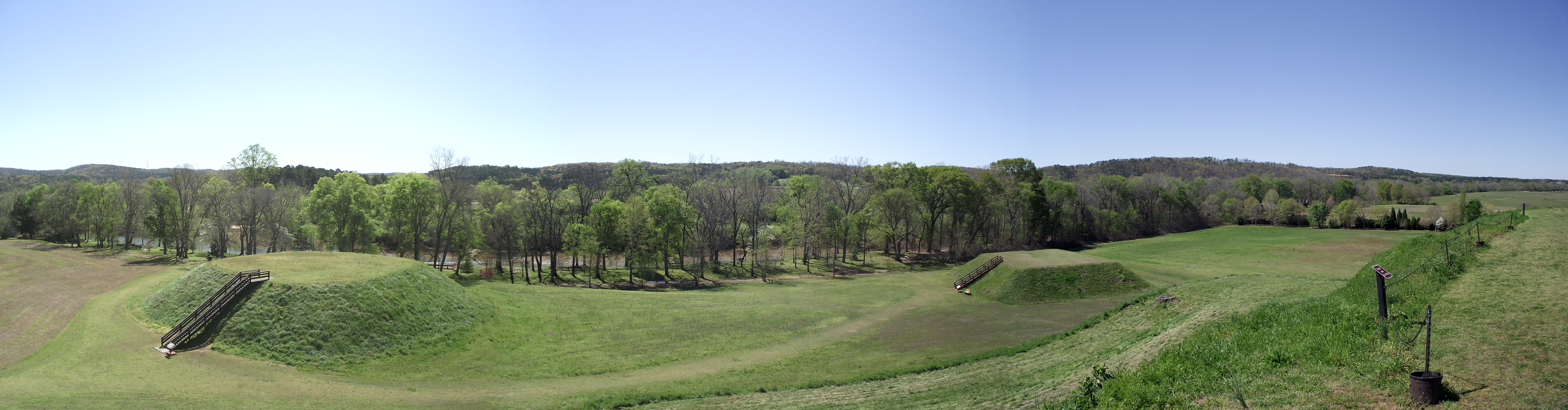
Mounds B, and C from the top of Mound A.

== See also ==
- Ocmulgee Mounds National Historical Park (Bibb County, Georgia)
- Kolomoki Mounds
- Leake Mounds (9BR2)
- Wilbanks Site
- Southeastern Ceremonial Complex
- List of Mississippian sites
- Funk Heritage Center
- List of National Historic Landmarks in Georgia (U.S. state)
- National Register of Historic Places listings in Bartow County, Georgia
