= George D. Wilbanks =

American surgeon and cancer researcher

- Born: June 3, 1931
- Died: June 3, 2012 (aged 81)
- Education: Duke University
- Occupations: Cancer researcher, surgeon, professor
- Known for: The human papillomavirus's role in cervical cancer

George Dewey Wilbanks Jr. was an American cancer researcher, surgeon, and professor of obstetrics and gynecology. He was best known for his research in cervical cancer and was responsible for early work identifying the human papillomavirus and its relationship to the development of cancer, eventually leading to the development of the herpes vaccine Gardasil.

== Career ==
Wilbanks helped establish gynecologic oncology as a specialty. He was the first full-time chairman of obstetrics and gynecology at what is now Rush University Medical Center in Chicago. In addition to his research on cancer, which included both cervical and ovarian cancer, he was a pioneer of in-vitro fertilization, founding the second clinic in the U.S. to use these techniques. He also regularly treated patients.

Born in Georgia, Wilbanks grew up on a dairy farm in Tampa, Florida. He attended Duke University, completing a combined 6-year bachelor's / MD program. After completing his medical training through an internship and residencies in Philadelphia, Durham and Boston, Wilbanks served at Tinker Air Force Base in Oklahoma. He then returned to Duke University as an assistant professor, where he helped establish its gynecologic pathology program. He moved to Chicago in 1970, becoming the John M. Simpson Professor and Chairman of Obstetrics and Gynecology at Rush Medical College, a position he held until 1996.

Wilbanks served as president of a number of professional organizations, including the American Congress of Obstetricians and Gynecologists, the Association of Professors of Gynecology and Obstetrics, the International Federation for Cervical Pathology and Colposcopy, and the American Society for Colposcopy and Cervical Pathology. He was a Regent at the American College of Surgeons and a former Board member and medical adviser to Planned Parenthood of Chicago.

Two professorships have been established in his honor:

- The George D. Wilbanks Chair in Gynecological Oncology at Rush Medical College to support research in ovarian cancer
- The George D. Wilbanks Lectureship in Gynecologic Oncology at the University of South Florida

== Personal life ==
Wilbanks was married to Evelyn Rivers Wilbanks, a professor of art history and archivist. He had two sons including George Wilbanks.

Wilbanks died on June 3, 2012, of natural causes.
