= National Park Mountain =

Mountain in Wyoming, United States

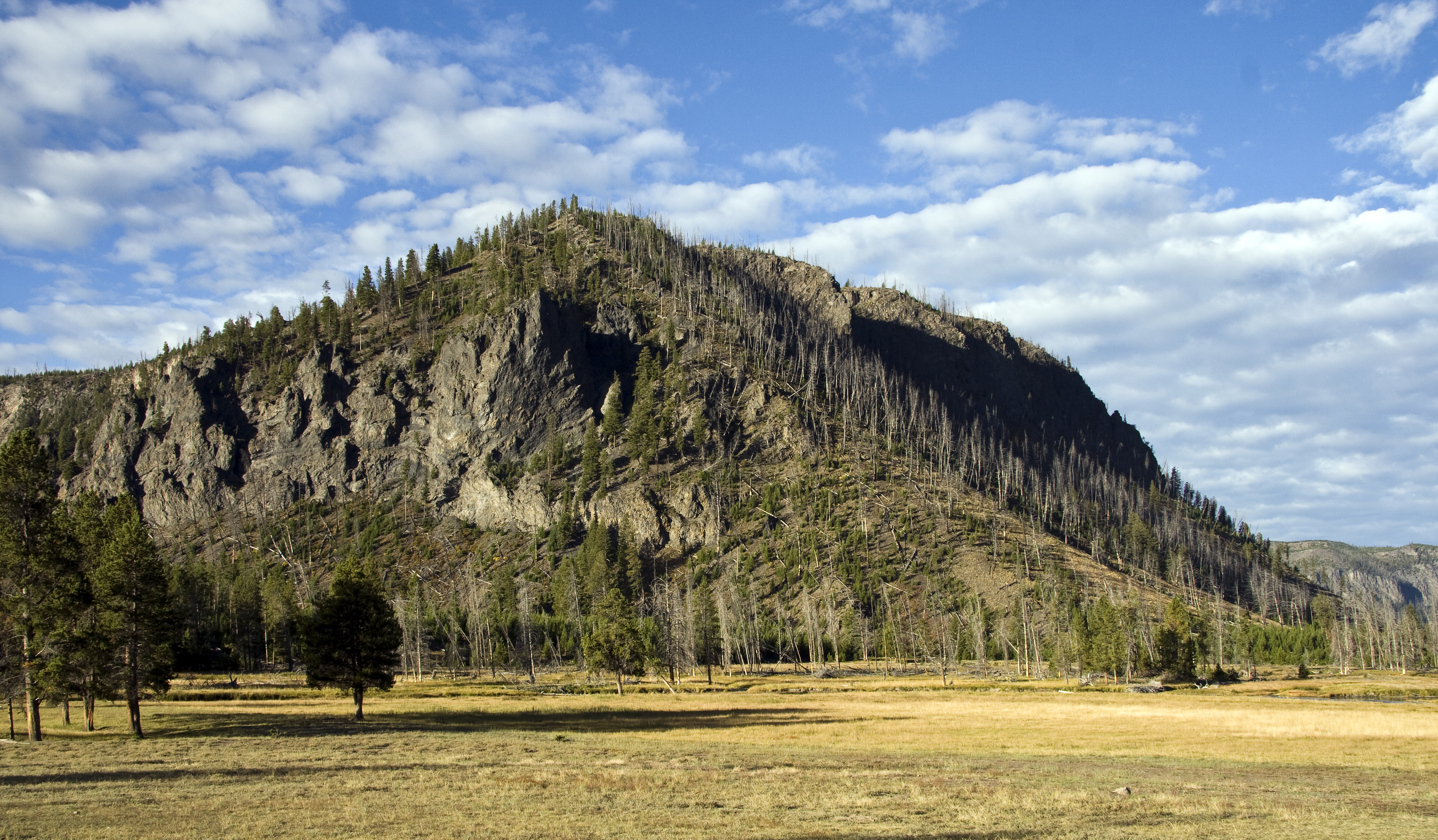
- National Park Mountain

Highest point
- Elevation: 7,553 ft (2,302 m)
- Prominence: 29 ft (8.8 m)
- Coordinates: 44°38′13″N 110°52′18″W

Geography
- Location within Wyoming Location within the United States
- Location: Teton County, Wyoming, U.S.
- Parent range: Yellowstone Plateau
- Topo map: USGS Madison Junction

Climbing
- Easiest route: Hike

National Park Mountain (7,553 feet (2,302 m)) is in Yellowstone National Park in the U.S. state of Wyoming. National Park Mountain rises above the confluence of the Firehole River and the Madison River and is just west of Madison Junction.
