= Swift Creek culture =

Archaeological culture in the southeastern US

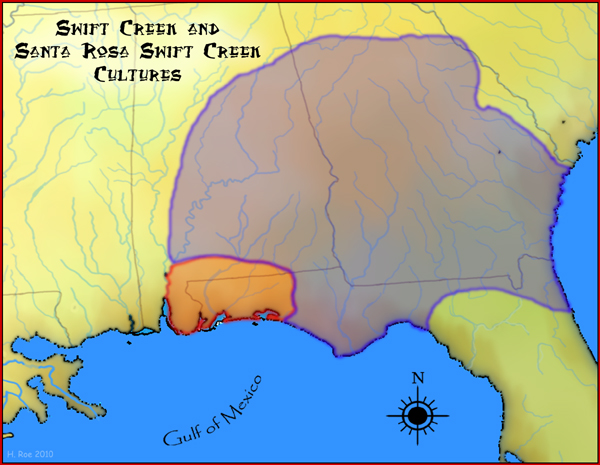
A map showing the geographical extent of the Swift Creek culture

The Swift Creek culture was a Middle Woodland period archaeological culture in the Southeastern Woodlands of North America, dating to around 100-800 CE. It occupied the areas now part of Georgia, Alabama, Florida, South Carolina, and Tennessee. In Florida, Swift Creek ceremonial practices and burial complexes are referred to technically as the Yent-Green Point complex. The Swift Creek culture was contemporaneous with and interacted with the Hopewell culture; Swift Creek is often described as "Hopewellian." The type site for the Swift Creek culture was the Swift Creek mound site, which was located in Bibb County, Georgia. The Leake Mounds are another significant Swift Creek Culture site in Georgia.

Swift Creek peoples practiced mound-building but were generally non-sedentary. Their sustenance resulted from hunting, gathering/collecting, and fishing. Swift Creek are characterized by earthenware pottery with complicated stamped designs, involving mostly curvilinear elements. Examples of a type of pottery decoration consisting of diamond-shaped checks found at the Swift Creek sites are also known from Hopewell sites in Ohio (such as Seip Earthworks, Rockhold, Harness, and Turner), and the Mann site in southern Indiana as well as the Crystal River Site in Florida.

== Swift Creek Complicated Stamping ==
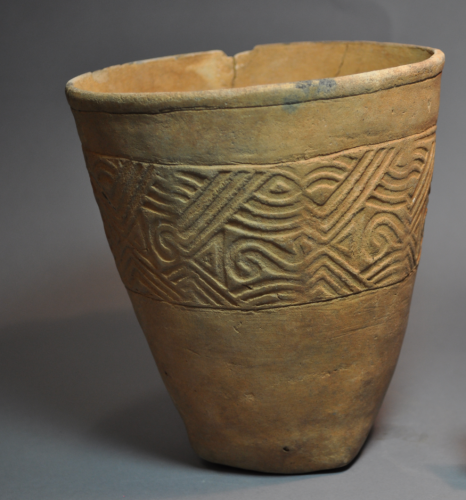
A deep jar stamped and fired by the Swift Creek culture.

The Swift Creek people practiced their own form of pottery, known as Swift Creek Complicated Stamping. In this process, one would carve out the design of the pottery in a wooden paddle. This design usually featured curvilinear patterns. From the wooden paddle, it would be stamped on to the pottery, which was then fired. Throughout the existence of the Swift Creek culture, this process continued to evolve through the years 20 BCE to 805 CE. The earliest finding of these works were deep jars with scalloped and notched rims. Towards the end of the practice, pottery was found to be bowls with folded rims.

== See also ==
- Santa Rosa-Swift Creek culture
- Hopewell tradition
- List of Hopewell sites
