= National Register of Historic Places listings in Park County, Wyoming =

Location of Park County in Wyoming

This is a list of the National Register of Historic Places listings in Park County, Wyoming.

This is intended to be a complete list of the properties and districts on the National Register of Historic Places in Park County, Wyoming, United States. The locations of National Register properties and districts for which the latitude and longitude coordinates are included below, may be seen in a map.

There are 44 properties and districts listed on the National Register in the county, six of which are National Historic Landmarks.

This National Park Service list is complete through NPS recent listings posted October 9, 2026.

Contents: Counties in Wyoming
Albany - Big Horn - Campbell - Carbon - Converse - Crook - Fremont - Goshen - Hot Springs - Johnson - Laramie - Lincoln - Natrona - Niobrara - Park - Platte - Sheridan - Sublette - Sweetwater - Teton - Uinta - Washakie - Weston

== Current listings ==
	Name on the Register	Image	Date listed	Location	City or town	Description
1	Absaroka Mountain Lodge	Absaroka Mountain Lodge	October 30, 2003 (#03001105)	1231 North Fork Highway; 44°27′25″N 109°47′29″W	Wapiti	Dude ranch established in 1917, with 15 contributing properties; an operational and nearly intact example of a local business model spurred by the rise of middle-class auto tourism.
2	American Legion Hall		December 11, 2023 (#100009598)	324 East 1st Street; 44°45′10″N 108°45′21″W	Powell	
3	Anderson Lodge	Anderson Lodge	September 14, 1987 (#87001548)	Greybull Ranger District, Shoshone National Forest; 44°06′06″N 109°25′59″W	Meeteetse vicinity	Rustic 1890 artist's cabin turned Yellowstone Forest Reserve administrative building, associated with rancher, artist, and superintendent Abraham Archibald Anderson (1846–1940) and the development of the U.S. Forest Service.
4	Quintin Blair House		September 27, 1991 (#91000998)	5588 Greybull Highway; 44°30′34″N 109°00′05″W	Cody	Wyoming's only Frank Lloyd Wright building, built 1952–53 in his "natural" style which influenced post-World War II suburban house design.
5	Buffalo Bill Boyhood Home	Buffalo Bill Boyhood Home	June 5, 1975 (#75001906)	720 Sheridan Ave. 44°31′27″N 109°04′25″W	Cody	One of Wyoming's oldest and most moved buildings, constructed in 1841 in LeClaire, Iowa, and brought to the first of three locations in Cody in 1933 as a tourist attraction. Now on the grounds of the Buffalo Bill Center of the West.
6	Buffalo Bill Dam	Buffalo Bill Dam	August 12, 1971 (#71000890)	4808 North Fork Highway; 44°30′05″N 109°10′59″W	Cody	One of the nation's first two gravity-arch dams, built 1905–1910 under challenging conditions for the Shoshone Project, a pioneering federal effort to boost the settlement capacity of the arid American West.
7	Buffalo Bill Statue	Buffalo Bill Statue	December 31, 1974 (#74002319)	720 Sheridan Ave. 44°31′34″N 109°04′30″W	Cody	1924 equestrian statue of Buffalo Bill by Gertrude Vanderbilt Whitney, a latter-day subject in the Euro-American tradition of artworks commemorating white explorers and frontiersmen.
8	Clay Butte Lookout	Clay Butte Lookout	January 8, 2014 (#13001065)	Forest Service Rd. 142; 44°56′40″N 109°37′36″W	Clark vicinity	Rare surviving example of a fire lookout tower with New Deal-style standard design elements, built 1941–1943 and expanded 1962–63, symbolizing the U.S. Forest Service's wildfire management practices and the Civilian Conservation Corps.
9	Colter's Hell	Colter's Hell	August 14, 1973 (#73001937)	West of Cody on U.S. Route 14; 44°30′53″N 109°07′02″W	Cody	Geothermal area (now largely dormant) encountered by explorer and mountain man John Colter (c. 1770–c. 1812) in 1807; the first definitive place in Wyoming described by a Euro-American.
10	Dead Indian Campsite	Dead Indian Campsite	May 3, 1974 (#74002030)	Sunlight Basin Road	Cody vicinity	Archaeological site with multiple cultural assemblages spanning 4,500 years, with numerous stone and bone tools, a wide variety of faunal remains, and deer antlers placed in a rock cairn.
11	Downtown Cody Historic District	Downtown Cody Historic District	August 15, 1983 (#83003361)	1155–1313 and 1192–1286 Sheridan Ave. 44°31′34″N 109°03′47″W	Cody	Small commercial district representing the prosperity achieved by Cody and the surrounding region at the turn of the 20th century, with 20 contributing properties built 1900–1930s.
12	Elephant Head Lodge		October 30, 2003 (#03001107)	1170 North Fork Highway; 44°27′17″N 109°48′16″W	Wapiti	Operational and highly intact example of a dude ranch established in 1926, with eight contributing properties.
13	First National Bank of Meeteetse	First National Bank of Meeteetse	September 5, 1990 (#90001388)	1033 Park Ave. 44°09′25″N 108°52′21″W	Meeteetse	1901 bank building, a key vestige of Meeteetse's early commercial district. Restored as a museum in 1988.
14	Fort Yellowstone	Fort Yellowstone	July 31, 2003 (#03001032)	Mammoth and Norris, Wyoming; Gardiner, Montana; near Buffalo Lake, Idaho; 44°58′30″N 110°41′53″W	Yellowstone National Park	Headquarters complex and remote patrol cabins built during the initial administration of Yellowstone by the U.S. Army 1886–1918, establishing policies and procedures that influenced subsequent conservation and national park management. Extends into Teton County; Park County, Montana; and Fremont County, Idaho.
15	Goff Creek	Goff Creek	August 4, 2026 (#100013263)	Address restricted	Cody vicinity	
16	Goff Creek Lodge		October 30, 2003 (#03001108)	995 North Fork Highway; 44°27′17″N 109°50′14″W	Wapiti	Operational and highly intact example of a dude ranch, with 10 contributing properties built 1910–1945. Now the Creekside Lodge Yellowstone.
17	Grand Loop Road Historic District	Grand Loop Road Historic District	December 23, 2003 (#03001345)	Grand Loop Rd. 44°42′12″N 110°35′36″W	Yellowstone National Park	The nation's first large planned park road system, developed 1872–1905 in challenging conditions by the Army Corps of Engineers under Hiram M. Chittenden (1858–1917). Comprises 140 miles (230 km) and nine 1930s bridges harmonized to the setting.
18	Hayden Arch Bridge	Hayden Arch Bridge	February 22, 1985 (#85000430)	Hayden Arch Rd. 44°30′37″N 109°08′50″W	Cody	Wyoming's only large reinforced concrete arch bridge, built 1924–25.
19	Heart Mountain Relocation Center	Heart Mountain Relocation Center	December 19, 1985 (#85003167)	1539 Road 19; 44°40′12″N 108°56′44″W	Ralston	Site of a federal concentration camp for the internment of Japanese Americans 1942–1945, where some internees conducted the largest single draft resistance effort in U.S. history. Contains five contributing properties and an interpretive center.
20	Horner Site	Horner Site	October 15, 1966 (#66000758)	On a bluff overlooking the confluence of Sage Creek and the Shoshone River, 5 miles (8 km) east of Cody; 44°33′21″N 108°59′39″W	Cody	Site where Paleo-Indians processed bison for at least a thousand years, showing a variety of stone tools types in contemporaneous use; type site for the Cody complex.
21	Irma Hotel	Irma Hotel	April 3, 1973 (#73001936)	1192 Sheridan Ave. 44°31′33″N 109°03′52″W	Cody	Hotel established by Buffalo Bill Cody in 1902 as a first-class amenity and social center for his anticipated influx of wealthy vacationers, investors, and regional businessmen. Also a contributing property to the Downtown Cody Historic District.
22	Lamar Buffalo Ranch	Lamar Buffalo Ranch	December 7, 1982 (#82001835)	Northeast Entrance Rd. 44°53′44″N 110°14′08″W	Yellowstone National Park	Five-building complex used for bison management 1907–1952, initially under cattle ranching methods, illustrating bison conservation, the evolution of wildlife management practices, and changing park ranger duties.
23	Mammoth Hot Springs Historic District	Mammoth Hot Springs Historic District	March 20, 2002 (#02000257)	North Entrance Rd. and Mammoth-Norris Rd. 44°58′27″N 110°41′56″W	Mammoth	Yellowstone National Park's longstanding administrative and concession headquarters, with 192 contributing properties built 1891–1948. Associated with the development of the park and national park policies in general, the New Deal, and numerous architectural styles.
24	Mummy Cave	Mummy Cave	February 18, 1981 (#81000611)	North Fork Highway; 44°27′39″N 109°44′10″W	Wapiti	Unusually dry and well stratified rock shelter occupied from the late Paleoindian to the Late Prehistoric period, preserving rare organic artifacts and a high-status human burial.
25	Norris Museum/Norris Comfort Station	Norris Museum/Norris Comfort Station	July 21, 1983 (#83003362)	Grand Loop Rd. 44°43′35″N 110°42′12″W	Yellowstone National Park	Rustic 1929 museum and 1930s restroom dating to the early years of the National Park Service's visitor education initiatives.
26	Norris, Madison, and Fishing Bridge Museums	Norris, Madison, and Fishing Bridge Museums	May 28, 1987 (#87001445)	Norris Geyser Basin, Madison Junction, and Fishing Bridge; 44°33′47″N 110°22′40″W	Yellowstone National Park	Three trailside museums and a staff residence built 1929–1931, whose National Park Service rustic architecture was a major influence on buildings in national, state, and county parks around the U.S. during the New Deal. Extends into Teton County.
27	North Entrance Road Historic District	North Entrance Road Historic District	May 22, 2002 (#02000530)	North Entrance Road between Gardiner and Mammoth; 44°59′00″N 110°41′29″W	Yellowstone National Park	Five-mile (8 km) entrance road associated with the park's planned road system, early Army Corps of Engineers contributions, seminal rustic style, and the first entrance marking at a national park. Extends into Park County, Montana.
28	Obsidian Cliff	Obsidian Cliff	June 19, 1996 (#96000973)	Approximately 13 miles south of Mammoth; eastern side of U.S. Route 89, south of Obsidian Cliff Kiosk; 44°49′19″N 110°43′40″W	Yellowstone National Park	Pivotal Native American quarrying site for obsidian tools and ceremonial objects traded throughout the North American interior for 11,500 years. Also a key site in the development of geochemical analysis of lithic artifacts.
29	Obsidian Cliff Kiosk	Obsidian Cliff Kiosk	July 9, 1982 (#82001719)	Grand Loop Rd. 44°49′26″N 110°43′45″W	Yellowstone National Park	The first roadside interpretive exhibit in the national park system, built in 1931 in superlative National Park Service rustic style.
30	Pagoda Creek	Pagoda Creek	December 22, 2017 (#100001914)	North Fork Highway; 44°27′48″N 109°35′01″W	Wapiti	Site used during 7th century BCE winters for butchering and processing large game and manufacturing and maintaining stone tools.
31	Pahaska Tepee	Pahaska Tepee	March 20, 1973 (#73001938)	183 North Fork Highway; 44°30′10″N 109°57′47″W	Wapiti	Buffalo Bill Cody's 1901 hotel and hunting lodge, an influence on the development of Yellowstone's east entrance road and on the conservation ideas of his prestigious private guests.
32	Pioneer School	Pioneer School	October 5, 1993 (#93001011)	County Road 1-AG north of Badger Basin; 44°58′23″N 109°05′03″W	Clark	Rare surviving example of Park County's 20th-century rural schools, active 1914–1969.
33	Ralston Community Clubhouse	Ralston Community Clubhouse	July 23, 1998 (#98000907)	969 Carbon St. 44°43′11″N 108°52′05″W	Ralston	Clubhouse in use since 1930 by a longstanding women's club, forming the social and civic center of a dispersed rural community.
34	Red Lodge-Cooke City Approach Road Historic District	Red Lodge-Cooke City Approach Road Historic District	May 8, 2014 (#14000219)	U.S. Route 212; 44°55′41″N 109°38′10″W	Clark	60-mile (97 km) scenic federal highway built 1931–1936 in challenging alpine conditions. Better known as the Beartooth Highway, it extends into Carbon and Park County, Montana.
35	Red Star Lodge and Sawmill		October 30, 2003 (#03001106)	349 North Fork Highway; 44°29′43″N 109°56′06″W	Wapiti	Operational and highly intact example of a dude ranch, with 24 contributing properties built 1924–1950. Now the Shoshone Lodge.
36	Roosevelt Lodge Historic District	Roosevelt Lodge Historic District	April 4, 1983 (#83003363)	100 Roosevelt Lodge Rd., Tower Junction; 44°54′45″N 110°25′01″W	Yellowstone National Park	Rustic lodge and cabin complex with 124 contributing properties built 1919–1938, associated with the park's early educational programs and development of accommodations for middle-class automobile tourists.
37	Sage Creek Community Club	Sage Creek Community Club	August 19, 2024 (#100009599)	5677 Greybull Highway; 44°30′43″N 108°59′07″W	Cody	1924 clubhouse noted for its vernacular architecture and long-serving importance to the social cohesion of a rural, agricultural community.
38	Stock Center	Stock Center	January 1, 1976 (#76001960)	836 Sheridan Ave. 44°31′32″N 109°04′14″W	Cody	Community-built museum patterned after a frontier ranch house; original home of the Buffalo Bill Museum 1927–1969.
39	Paul Stock House	Paul Stock House	January 27, 2000 (#99001727)	1300 Sunset Dr. 44°31′24″N 109°04′50″W	Cody	Four-building residence constructed 1945–46 by Paul Stock (1894–1972), a pioneer in the Wyoming oil industry, three-time mayor of Cody, and philanthropist.
40	T E Ranch Headquarters		April 3, 1973 (#73001939)	30 miles southwest of Cody on South Fork Rd. 44°16′53″N 109°29′30″W	Cody	Log main house of a ranch owned by Buffalo Bill Cody (1846–1917) from 1895 until his death.
41	US Post Office-Powell Main	US Post Office-Powell Main	May 22, 1987 (#87000787)	270 N. Bent St. 44°45′19″N 108°45′29″W	Powell	1937 post office, one of five in Wyoming with Section of Painting and Sculpture artwork, symbolizing the extensive New Deal public works and federal presence benefiting small communities.
42	US Post Office-Yellowstone Main	US Post Office-Yellowstone Main	May 19, 1987 (#87000789)	114 Albright Ave., Yellowstone National Park; 44°58′37″N 110°41′56″W	Mammoth	1937 post office, the only example in the western U.S. merging a standard Moderne plan with French Renaissance Revival elements. Also a contributing property to the Mammoth Hot Springs Historic District.
43	UXU Ranch		May 24, 2003 (#03000581)	1710 North Fork Highway; 44°27′18″N 109°42′53″W	Wapiti	Operational and highly intact dude ranch established in 1929, with 11 contributing properties; representing local entrepreneurship upon the rise of middle-class auto tourism.
44	Wapiti Ranger Station	Wapiti Ranger Station	October 15, 1966 (#66000759)	2285 North Fork Highway; 44°27′52″N 109°36′52″W	Wapiti	The nation's first U.S. Forest Service ranger station, built for Shoshone National Forest in 1903.

== Former listings ==
	Name on the Register	Image	Date listed	Date removed	Location	City or town	Description
1	Homesteaders Historical Museum		June 19, 1973 (#73002262)	April 6, 2011	301 E. 1st St.	Powell	Also known as the Shoshone Project Headquarters Office. Demolished in 1974.

== See also ==
- List of National Historic Landmarks in Wyoming
- National Register of Historic Places listings in Wyoming
- National Register of Historic Places listings in Yellowstone National Park
