= Dead Indian =

Dead Indian may refer to:

- Dead Indian Campsite, an archeological site in Wyoming
- Dead Indian Creek (Oregon)
- Dead Indian Creek (Wyoming)
- Dead Indian Pass, a mountain pass in Wyoming
- Dead Indian Soda Springs

== See also ==
- Dead Injun Creek
