= Buffalo Bill Cody Scenic Byway =

Highway in Wyoming, US

Coordinates: 44.5109°N 109.2298°W

Route information
- Maintained by WYDOT
- Length: 27.5 mi (44.3 km)
- Existed: May 14, 1991–present

Location
- Country: United States
- State: Wyoming

Highway system
- Scenic Byways; National; National Forest; BLM; NPS; Wyoming State Highway System; Interstate; US; State

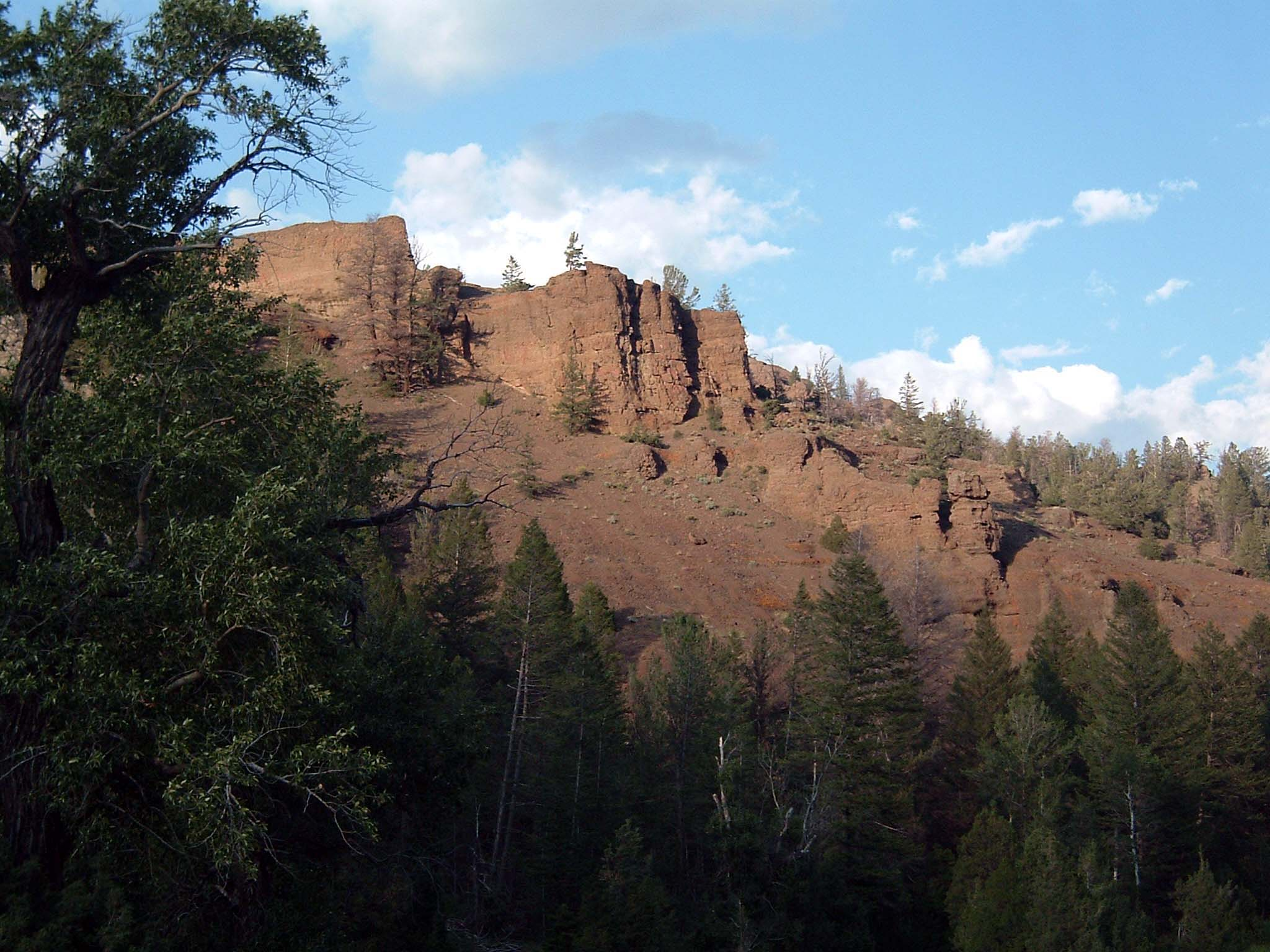
Rocky cliffs above Buffalo Bill Cody Scenic byway

Buffalo Bill Cody Scenic Byway is in the U.S. state of Wyoming and spans most of the distance from Cody, Wyoming to Yellowstone National Park. The 27.5-mile (44.3 km) scenic highway follows the north fork of the Shoshone River through the Wapiti Valley to Sylvan Pass and the eastern entrance to Yellowstone. Most of the scenic byway is contained within Shoshone National Forest and is also known as US Highway 14 (US 14), US 16 and US 20.

== Route description ==
The Buffalo Bill Cody Scenic Byway starts in Cody and follows US 14/US 16/US 20 along the Shoshone River. The route is known for its abundant wildlife, astonishing rock formations, and recreational opportunities. Approximately 6 miles (9.7 km) west of Cody the highway skirts the Buffalo Bill Reservoir, a source of excellent trout fishing, and location of Buffalo Bill State Park. The Park has facilities for camping, picnicking, boating, and windsurfing.

Beyond the reservoir, the highway enters the Shoshone National Forest. The Shoshone was set aside in 1891 as part of the Yellowstone Timberland Reserve. One of the oldest Forest Service ranger stations is situated in the Wapiti Valley. As the Indian name implies, The Wapiti Valley is home for the wapiti, or elk as well as the grizzly bear, bighorn sheep, moose, deer, and other wildlife. Buffalo Bill Cody built his hunting lodge, Pahaska Teepee, here beneath a sheltering cliff. This building is now listed on the National Register of Historic Places. The Wapiti Valley is home to fourteen historic lodges offering accommodation. At the head of the Wapiti Valley the highway enters Yellowstone National Park. and here the Byway ends, giving travelers an excellent route to the wonders of Yellowstone National Park.

=== Points of interest ===
Points of interest along the road include Colter's Hell, Buffalo Bill Dam, Mummy Cave and Pahaska Tepee, all listed on the National Register of Historic Places. The Wapiti Ranger Station is a National Historic Landmark. Historic dude ranches on the byway catered to the Yellowstone tourist trade and include the Elephant Head Lodge, Absaroka Mountain Lodge and the Red Star Lodge.

== History ==
The Buffalo Bill Cody Scenic Byway was designated as a National Forest Scenic Byway on May 14, 1991, and as a Wyoming State Scenic Byway in 1995.

== See also ==
- Black and Yellow Trail, an auto trail linking the Black Hills and Yellowstone, which ends at Cody.
