= Curtis Oehme =

American architect

Curtis Charles Oehme (born Carl Curt Öhme; June 10, 1877, in Dresden, German Empire – March 8, 1938) was a German-American architect based in Billings, Montana. Several of his works are listed on the National Register of Historic Places.

In 1917, Oehme was forced to resign from the Montana state board of architecture examiners over anti-German sentiment.

Works include:

- Billings West Side School (1909), 415 Broadwater Ave., Billings, Montana, NRHP-listed
- Broadwater Elementary School (1909)
- Baker and Lovering Store (1910 reconstruction and facade), Main St., Joliet, Montana, NRHP-listed
- Pioneer School (1914), Co. Rd. 1-AG N of Badger Basin, Clark, Wyoming, NRHP-listed
- Atlas Block (1915–16), Columbus, Montana, NRHP-listed
- County Home Building, Billings, Montana
- Wacholz Building (1917), 933 Main, Forsyth, Montana, with Beaux Arts style terra-cotta ornamentation
- Alexander Hotel (1917 renovation), 905-925 Main, Forsyth, Montana
