= Uxu =

Uxu may refer to:

- uXu, Underground eXperts United
- UXU Ranch, a historic dude ranch in Wyoming
- Uxu, Tibet, a village in Tibet
