= Quintin Blair House =

Historic house in Wyoming, United States

- U.S. National Register of Historic Places
- Location within Wyoming Location within the United States
- Location: 5588 Greybull Highway, Cody, Wyoming
- Coordinates: 44°30′34″N 109°0′4″W
- Built: 1952
- Architect: Frank Lloyd Wright
- Architectural style: Modern Movement
- NRHP reference No.: 91000998
- Added to NRHP: September 27, 1991

The Quintin Blair House in Cody, Wyoming, United States, was designed by Frank Lloyd Wright and built 1952–1953. The house is an example of Wright's "natural house" theme, emphasizing close integration of house and landscape. It is the only Wright building in Wyoming.

Ruth Taggart Blair was a student at the Chicago Academy of Fine Arts during the 1930s. Her professor, Bruce Goff, took the class to visit Taliesin at Spring Green, Wisconsin, where they met Wright. In 1951 Ruth and Quintin Blair were visiting Arizona, when Ruth suggested that they visit Taliesin West in Arizona, Wright's winter home. They were met by Wright in the driveway, introduced themselves, and were invited to stay for lunch. At the luncheon, Wright expressed a desire to design a house for them, as he had no buildings in Wyoming. At Wright's suggestion, the Blairs bought some land away from town, as Wright did not want to design for a city lot. The house was completed in 1953.

The house is laid out on a 4-foot (1.2 m) by 4-foot (1.2 m) grid. The house is dominated by a low, nearly flat roof that flares dramatically over the living room, where three sides of the room are floor-to-ceiling glass. The windows have mitered corners, eliminating a support and giving the impression that the glass itself incorporates a right-angle bend. A small triangular bay projects from the glass wall as a piano niche, a common Wright element. Exterior wall materials are primarily locally quarried ashlar sandstone.

The site is a 40-acre (16 ha) parcel near a small creek about 15 feet (4.6 m) below the house. Springs near the house have been dammed by a wall aligned with the piano bay's angled wall, forming a small pond. The house has been modified and somewhat enlarged, with consultation from Taliesin.

The Blair House was placed on the National Register of Historic Places in 1991.

== See also ==
- List of Frank Lloyd Wright works
- National Register of Historic Places listings in Park County, Wyoming
