= Downtown Cody Historic District =

Historic district in Wyoming, United States

- U.S. National Register of Historic Places
- U.S. Historic district
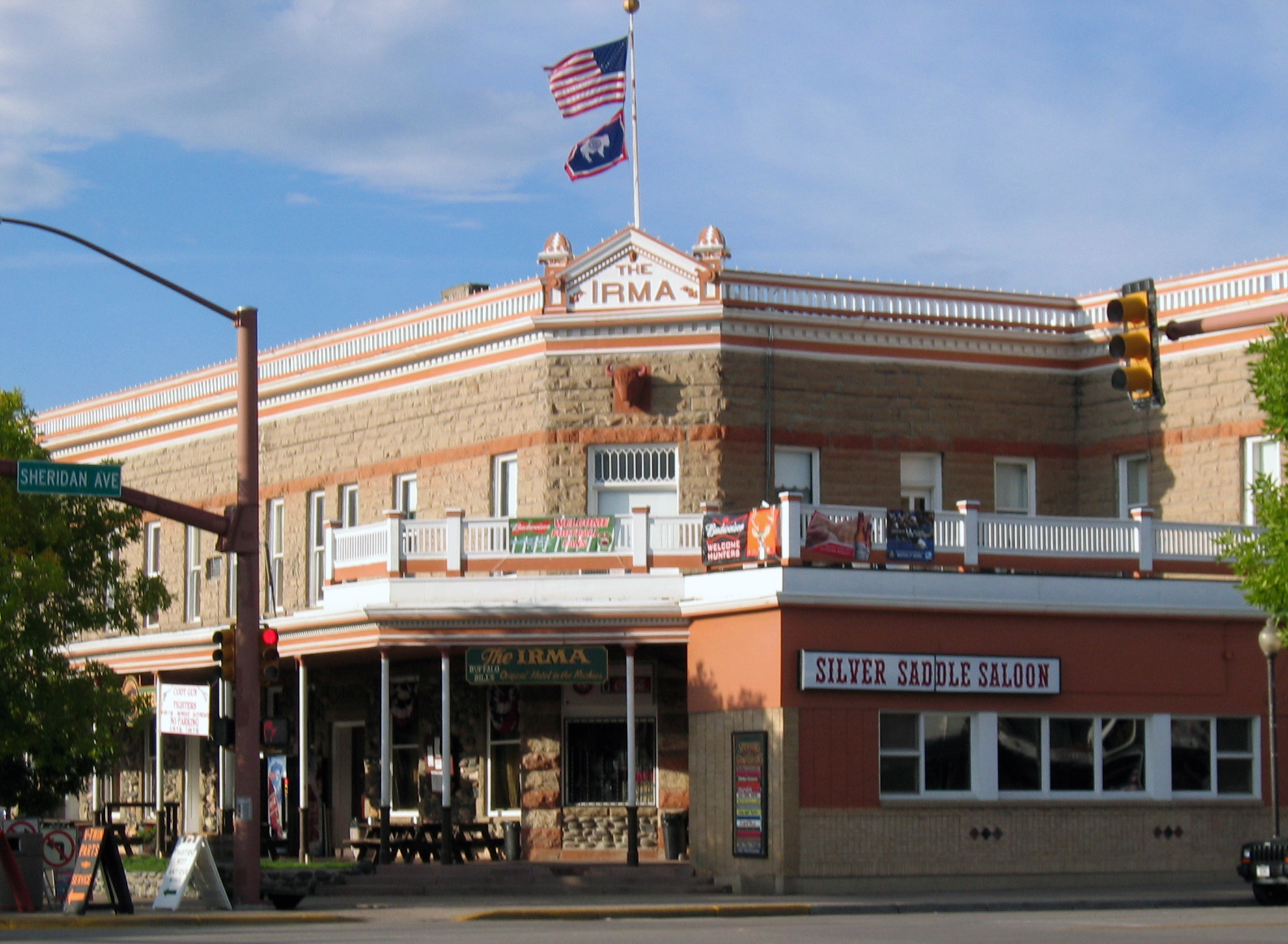
- Irma Hotel

- Location within Wyoming Location within the United States
- Location: 1155 to 1313 and 1192 to 1286 Sheridan Ave., Cody, Wyoming
- Coordinates: 44°31′34″N 109°3′47″W
- Area: 10 acres (4.0 ha)
- Architect: Multiple
- NRHP reference No.: 83003361
- Added to NRHP: August 15, 1983

The Downtown Cody Historic District is the historic core of Cody, Wyoming, USA. "Historic" here refers to the early twentieth century, as Cody was not incorporated until 1901. Most of the commercial district was built between 1901 and the 1930s. The district extends along Sheridan Avenue for two blocks, with buildings of brick and local sandstone with storefront display windows. The chief building in the district is the Irma Hotel, individually listed on the National Register of Historic Places.

The district extends between 1313 Sheridan to 1155 on the south side, and from 1286 to 1192 on the north side.
