= Pagoda Creek Site =

- Pagoda Creek
- U.S. National Register of Historic Places
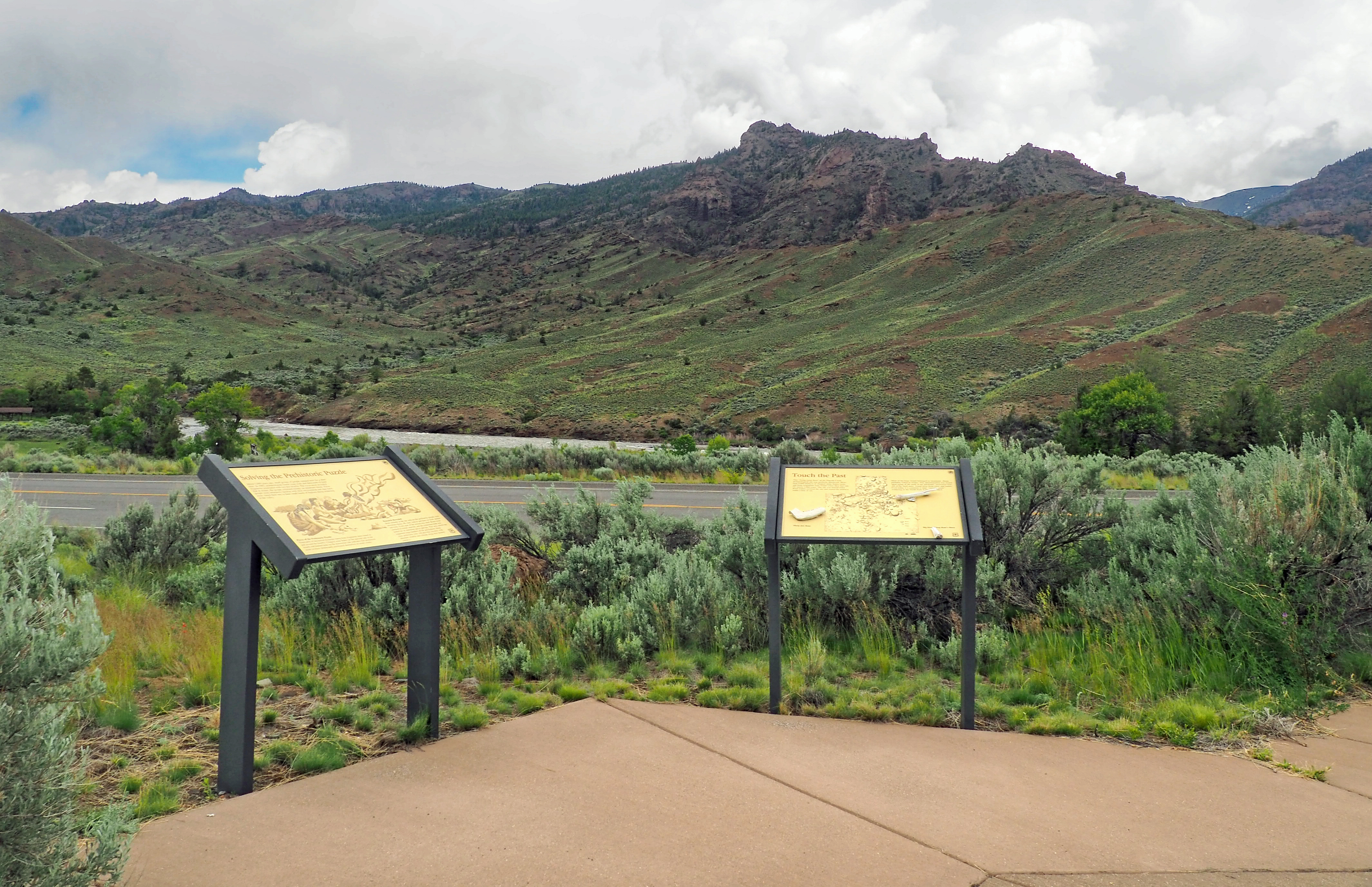
- Interpretive markers about the Pagoda Creek site in Shoshone National Forest
- Location: Address restricted
- Nearest city: Wapiti, Wyoming
- NRHP reference No.: 100001914
- Added to NRHP: December 22, 2017

Pagoda Creek is an archeological site which was listed on the National Register of Historic Places in 2017.

It is located in Park County, Wyoming, near Wapiti, Wyoming, along the North Fork of the Shoshone River between Yellowstone and Cody, Wyoming.

According to the state of Wyoming, "This scenic location is winter habitat for elk, bighorn sheep and mule deer. Between 2,730 and 2,799 years ago, this site was used mid-winter to butcher and process bighorn sheep and mule deer that had been killed nearby. Upwind from hearths at the site are artifacts indicating stone tool maintenance and manufacture. Downwind from the hearths are discarded bones. The bones have cut marks from butchering and were also busted up to remove the nutritious bone marrow. Parts of the site are well preserved and have the potential to provide further information about this period. The site was excavated in 1985 by a crew from the Office of the Wyoming State Archaeologist led by Dan Eakin before a road improvement project."
