= Atlas Block =

- U.S. National Register of Historic Places
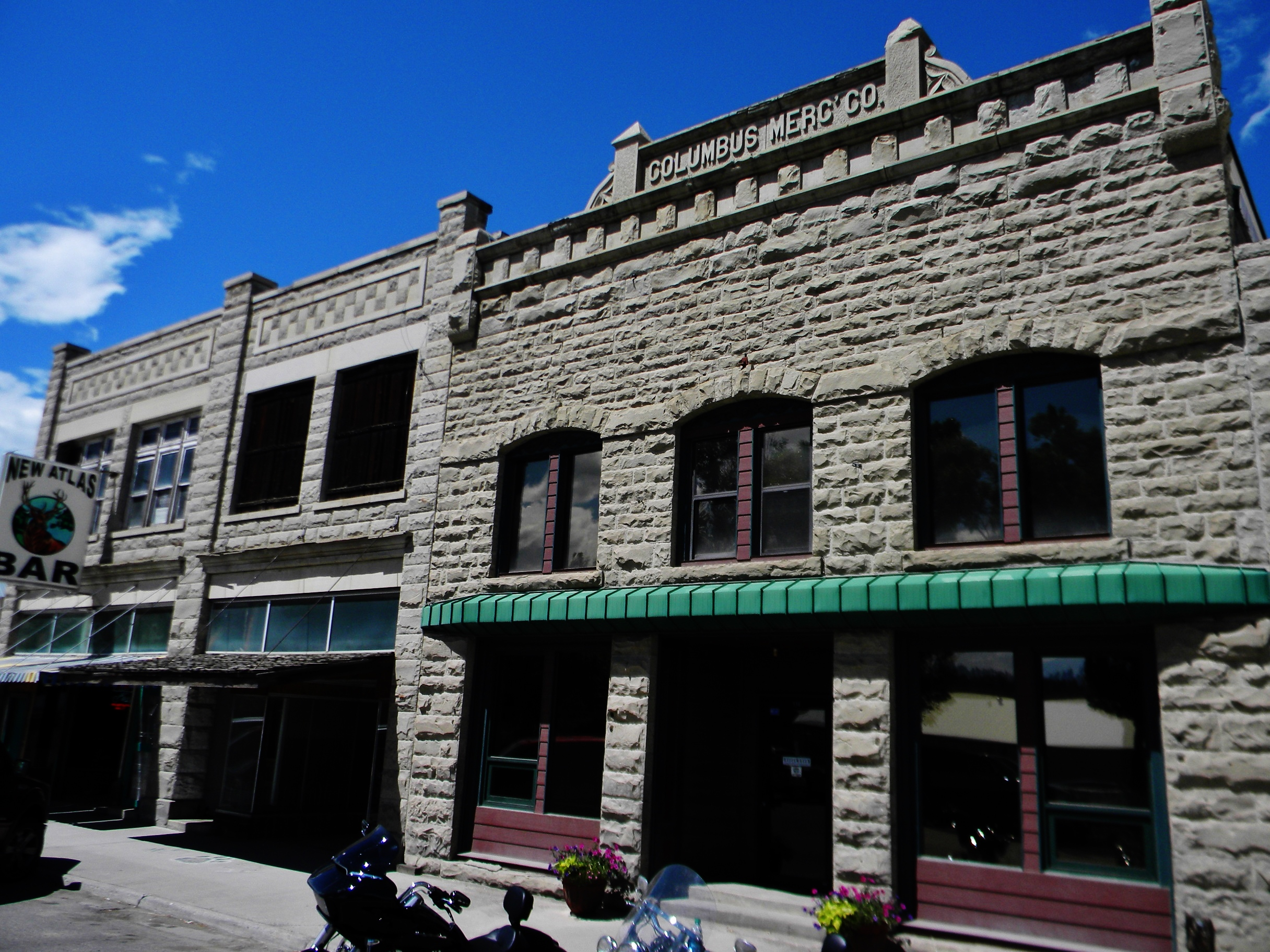

- Location within Montana Location within the United States
- Location: 523 & 528 E. Pike Ave., Columbus, Montana
- Coordinates: 45.636944°N 109.253056°W
- Area: 9,999 acres (4,046 ha)
- Architect: Curtis Oehme
- NRHP reference No.: 11000588
- Added to NRHP: August 24, 2011

The Atlas Block, at 523 & 528 E. Pike Ave. in Columbus in Stillwater County, Montana, is a historic commercial block building which was listed on the National Register of Historic Places in 2011.

The building has housed the "New Atlas Bar" for more than a century. It was built in 1915–16.

There is another Atlas Block building in the Helena Historic District in Helena, Montana, which is also notable.
