= Smith Mansion (Wyoming) =

House in Wyoming, United States

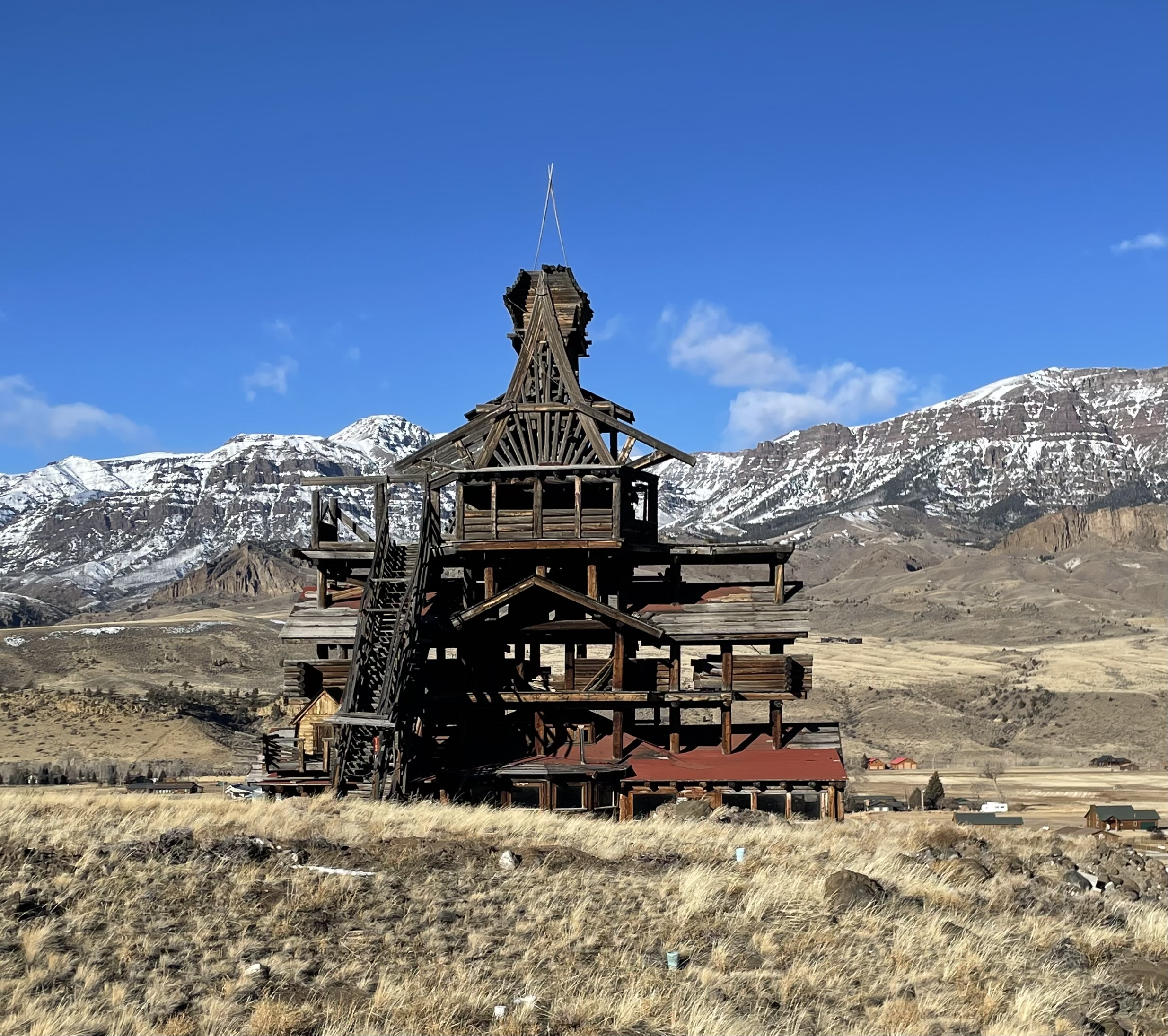
- The Smith Mansion, overlooking the Wapiti Valley (photographed January 2023)

General information
- Status: Under construction
- Location: Wapiti, Wyoming, US, 2902 North Fork Highway,
- Coordinates: 44°27′40″N 109°29′39″W
- Construction started: 1971
- Construction stopped: 1992 (Death of architect)

Height
- Height: 75 ft (22.9 m)

Technical details
- Floor area: 321 m^{2} (3,450 sq ft)

Design and construction
- Architect: Francis Lee Smith
- Known for: Distinctive architecture, prominence compared to surrounding valley, mystery around death of architect.

The Smith Mansion, also known as the Smith Family Cabin, is a large, prominent structure with a height of roughly 75 ft (22.9 m) in the Wapiti Valley in Wapiti, Wyoming. The mansion can be easily spotted if traveling down the North Fork Highway towards Yellowstone National Park, due to its towering, dark and intimidating architectural style. It takes the form of a large log tower, with sections seemingly tacked on haphazardly, although the tower is very stable.

== History ==
=== Francis Lee Smith ===
Francis Lee Smith was born January 4, 1944, in Cody, Wyoming to Irene B. and George R. Smith; he had two brothers, George D. and William H. Smith. Raised in Cody and attending Cody High School, he studied architecture at Montana State University, graduating in 1967 with honors.

=== Building of the mansion ===
In 1952, a large wildfire swept over Rattlesnake Mountain, just west of Cody. It left large amounts of timber unclaimed, and Smith decided to use this to build what he described as "A tribute to the North Fork Mountains". He chose the site atop the hill as he believed it to be the geographic center of the Wapiti Valley.

Lee broke ground in mid-1971, intending to build a family home for his wife and expected children. But once the first floor had been completed in early 1973, he decided to add more floors. Smith and his family lived in it while he was building it, without any electricity, running water, air conditioning, or gas, with the only source of heat in the entire building being a small wood-burning fireplace on the first floor.

In the early 1980s, Smith's wife Linda Smith-Mills divorced him, citing his continued obsession with building his mansion. According to her, when she divorced him, he seemed to "throw himself... deeper into the building of his house", and "Without me,... his house became his everything."

=== Death of Smith ===
Smith was working on an upper-level balcony of the house at about 6pm on April 25, 1992, when, reportedly, a large section of timber came loose and knocked him off the balcony. He fell roughly 20 feet (6.0m), his head or neck hitting a roof below, and dying instantly. A day later, a neighbor reported having seen Smith's dead body at the local sheriff's office. Smith was pronounced dead on scene. He is buried in Cody Cemetery, in his hometown of Cody, next to his mother and father.

== Preservation and purchase ==
=== Caretaking ===
After Francis Lee Smith died in 1992, his daughter Sunny Smith-Larsen has been the caretaker of the property. In October 2009, Paul and Sunny Larsen created the Smith Mansion Preservation Project, a charity website that sees to regular clean-ups and maintenance.

=== Purchase ===
In October 2019, the Smith Mansion was sold to Zhiru Huang of Mountain Lodging, a lodging company that owns many properties in the surrounding Cody area, including the Green Creek Inn & RV at the bottom of the hill the mansion rests on. Its sale price was not listed; however, estimates ranged between $250,000 and $500,000, with Realtor giving an estimated value of $414,300.
