= Horner site =

Archaeological site in Wyoming, United States

- Horner Site
- U.S. National Register of Historic Places
- U.S. National Historic Landmark
- Location within Wyoming Location within the United States
- Location: On a bluff overlooking the confluence of Sage Creek and the Shoshone River, 5 miles (8.0 km) east of Cody, Park County, Wyoming, USA
- Nearest city: Cody, Wyoming
- Coordinates: 44°33′21″N 108°59′39″W
- NRHP reference No.: 66000758

Significant dates
- Added to NRHP: October 15, 1966
- Designated NHL: January 20, 1961

The Horner Site, also known as the Creek Site and Horner's Corner Site, and designated by the Smithsonian trinomial 48PA29, is an important archaeological site near Cody, Wyoming, United States. It is the type site for the Cody complex. It was declared a National Historic Landmark in 1961.

== Setting ==
The Horner Site is located in the foothills of the Absaroka Range, on a terrace of land overlooking the confluence of Sage Creek and the Shoshone River, east of the town of Cody. The terrace is relatively flat, and has historically seen some cultivation. The area of archaeological interest has not been cultivated since its discovery. The site is on the western edge of the Bighorn Basin, an area believed to have a substantial prehistoric buffalo population.

== Archaeological history ==
The site was discovered in 1939 by a local collector, on land then belonging to Pearl Horner. In 1948, he notified Glen Jepsen, an archaeologist at Princeton University, of his finds. Jepsen, who had been performing investigations elsewhere in the Bighorn Basin, organized the first excavations on the site, in August 1949. Over the next three years, a number of excavations took place at the site, garnering national press interest, and visits by a great many scientists studying the early history of man in North America. The site became important because it was the first place where both Eden and Scottsbluff projectile points were found in properly datable geological contexts, and it is this confluence that gave rise to the Cody complex.

Due to the large amount of publicity, the site suffered in the following years from illegal artifact collection, compromising it to some extent. Archaeologist George Frisson, writing in 1987, opined that the site continued to be important due to its unique setting. Some deeply buried artifacts not readily discoverable by amateurs are known to remain at the site.

== See also ==
- List of National Historic Landmarks in Wyoming
- National Register of Historic Places listings in Park County, Wyoming

== Bibliography ==
- Frisson, George; Todd, Lawrence, eds. (2017). The Horner Site: The Type Site of the Cody Cultural Complex. Elsevier. ISBN 9781483299365.
- Gibbon, Guy E.; Ames, Kenneth M. Archaeology of Prehistoric Native America: An Encyclopedia. 1998. ISBN 0-8153-0725-X.
