= Lamb Spring =

Archaeological site in Colorado, United States

- U.S. National Register of Historic Places
- Colorado State Register of Historic Properties
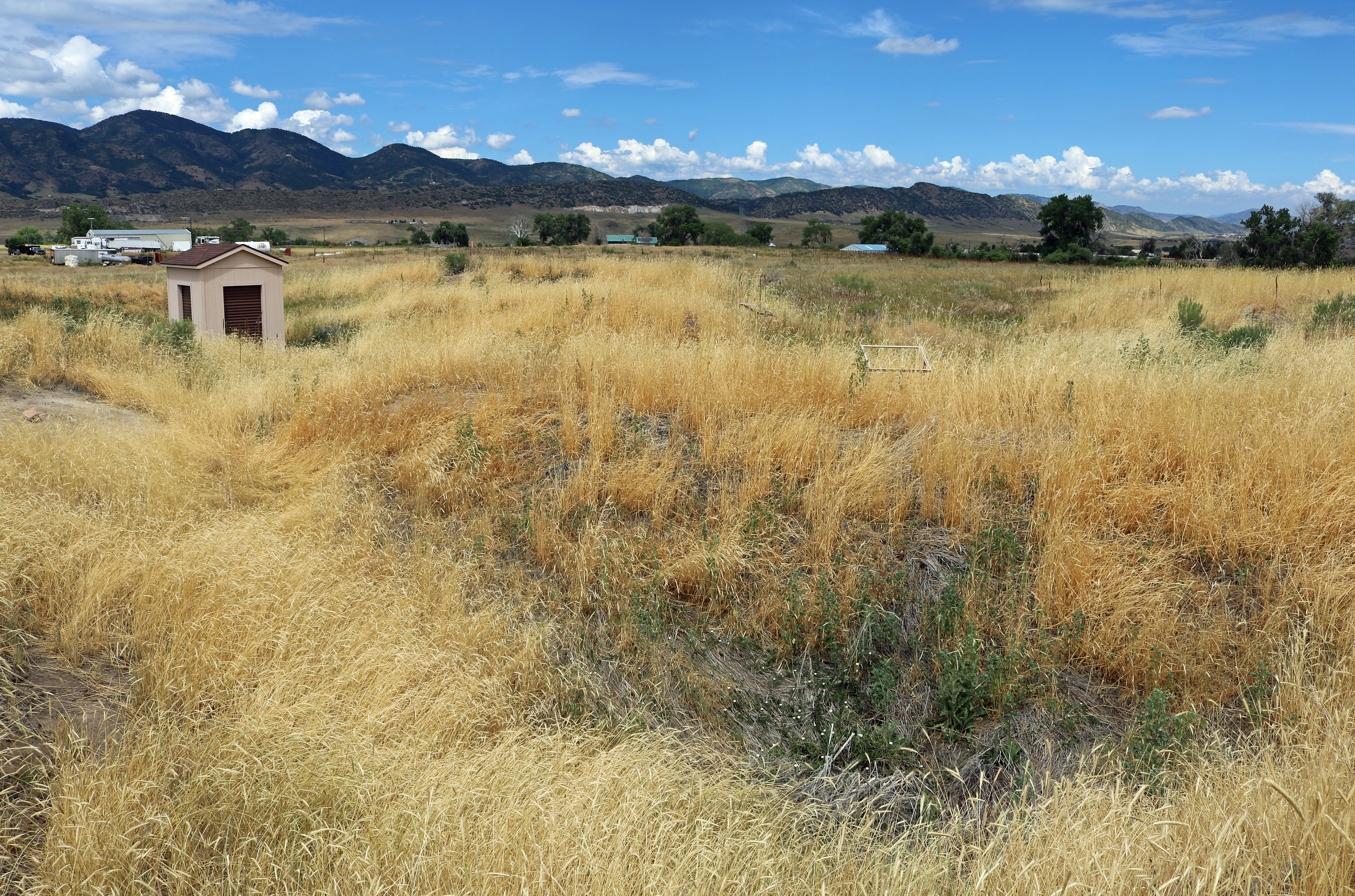
- The site in Douglas County.
- Nearest city: Littleton
- NRHP reference No.: 97000208
- CSRHP No.: 5DA.83
- Added to NRHP: 1997

Lamb Spring is a pre-Clovis culture prehistoric Paleo-Indian archaeological site located in Douglas County, Colorado, with the largest collection of Columbian mammoth bones in the state. Lamb Spring also provides evidence of Paleo-Indian hunting in a later period by the Cody culture complex group. Lamb Spring was listed in 1997 on the National Register of Historic Places.

== History ==
=== Paleo-Indians ===
Paleo-Indian were primarily hunters of large mammals called megafauna, such as the Bison antiquus, during a transitional period from Ice Age to Ice Age summer. As the climate warmed, glacial run-off created lakes and savannas. At the end of the summer period the land became drier, food was not as abundant for large animals, and they became extinct. People adapted by hunting smaller mammals and gathering wild plants to supplement their diet.

Lamb Spring was an early to late Paleo-Indian site in Colorado, with Megafauna bison antiquus, camelops, mammoth and horse remains.

Mammoth bones at the Lamb Spring site may pre-date the earliest known human culture, the Clovis culture, which flourished 11,000-13,000 years ago. Mammoth bones at the site are dated at 11,735 +/- 95 years ago and 13,140 +/- 1,000 years ago. Many large bones appear to have been broken at the site, which may indicate butchery by early man. There were also some broken rocks with the bones, but it has not been determined that they were used as tools. It has not yet been conclusively determined to be a pre-Clovis site, but continued excavation may find pre-Clovis tools and evidence that more conclusively finds that the mammoth died as a result of hunting.

The camelops bones and artifacts date back to about 11,000 BC. The site has Colorado's largest collection of Columbian mammoth bones. Pronghorn and rodent remains were also found. After 11,000 BC the climate changed and all of the megafauna except the bison antiquus were extinct. About 7000 or 6500 BC, Paleo-Indians hunted bison and smaller mammals at the spring.

=== Discovery ===
In the summer of 1960, while constructing a pond at a spring on his property, Charles Lamb found mammoth tusks and bones from about 13,000 years ago. Also found were bison, camel, and horse bones. His find quickly initiated a series of archaeological investigations and excavations.

=== Archaeological findings ===
A summary of archaeological efforts are:

Year	Name	Organization	Period and artifacts	Comments
1960	Dr. G. Edward Lewis	United States Geological Survey	Identified mammoth tusks and bones from the Pleistocene period.	
1960	Dr. G. Edward Lewis, Dr. Glenn Scott	United States Geological Survey	Visited the Lamb Spring site and found bison, camel, horse, mammoth, pronghorn, and rodent bones. They also found, at the same depth and in the same sediment, late Pleistocene era flint chips, meaning that the mammoth were likely hunted by Paleo-Indians.	
1961	Dr. Waldo Wedel, Dr. Glenn Scott	Smithsonian Institution, United States Geological Survey	Found bones from 5 mammoth from the end of the Ice Age, a little older than 13,000 Before Present (about 11,000 BC.)	
1961–1962	Dr. C.L. Gazin, Dr. Waldo R. Wedel	Smithsonian Institution	Eight geological layers were identified. Most of the remains found were from the earliest period, about 5–6 feet below the surface. The second deepest layer, dated about 6870 (+/- 350 years) BC, contained Cody complex projectile points and knife, bison remains, and other cutting and hide scraping tools.	The project was by a National Science Foundation grant. Nebraska State Museum, United States Geological Survey and University of Michigan personnel assisted in the excavation and analysis.
1980–1981	Dr. Dennis Stanford	Smithsonian Institution	Found bones for 30 mammoth and evidence that they had been hunted and dated bones at 10,140-12,140 BC. Bison bones and Cody implements were found at the next most recent layer of sediment and remains.	
2002	Dr. James Dixon; Dr. Paul Murphy	University of Colorado-Boulder Museum Studies Program, Denver Museum of Nature and Science	Excavated a Columbian mammoth skull, likely a juvenile, dated about 11,000 BC.	The excavation and study were conducted with the participation of Douglas County and the Archaeological Conservancy.

Artifacts from the archaeological excavations are located at the Denver Museum of Nature and Science and the National Museum of Natural History in Washington, D.C.

== Lamb Spring Archaeological Preserve ==
The 32 acres around the Lamb Spring site was purchased by The Archaeological Conservancy in 1995. Assisting them in the acquisition were the Denver Museum of Nature and Science, Douglas County, Colorado and the Smithsonian Institution. Free tours are available, May through October, on the 1st Saturday of the month. The tours are sponsored by the Conservancy and the Douglas County Community Planning and Sustainable Development department.

== See also ==
- National Register of Historic Places listings in Douglas County, Colorado
- List of prehistoric sites in Colorado
