= Pioneer School =

- U.S. National Register of Historic Places
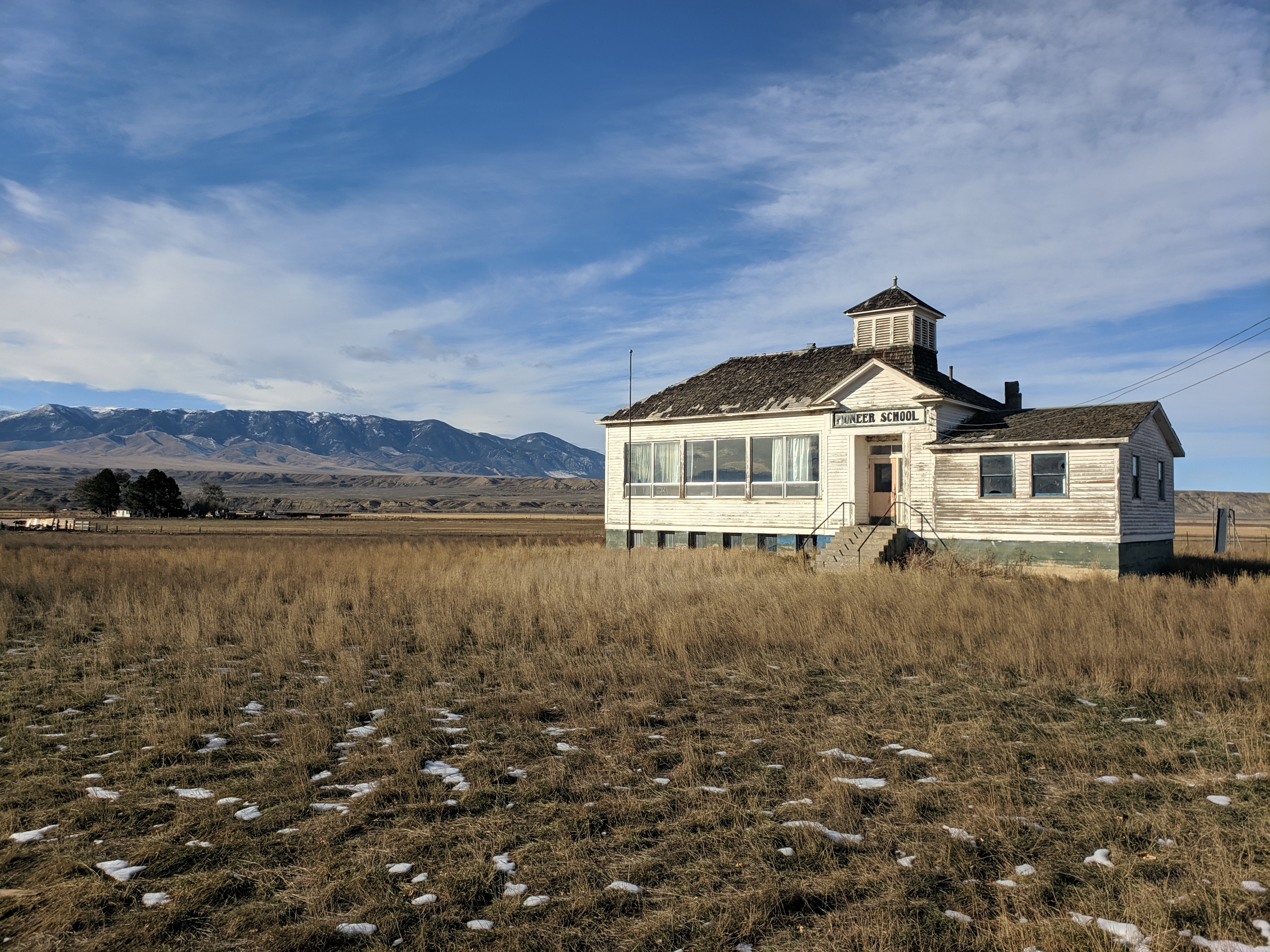

- Location within Wyoming Location within the United States
- Nearest city: Clark, Wyoming
- Coordinates: 44°58′23″N 109°5′0″W
- Built: 1914
- Built by: Anderson, H.P.
- Architect: Curtis C. Oehme
- NRHP reference No.: 93001011
- Added to NRHP: October 5, 1993

The Pioneer School stands in an isolated location in Park County, Wyoming, about 8 miles (13 km) north of Clark, in the Clark Fork Valley near the Montana border. The frame structure is an example of a country school built to serve students in rural areas prior to the introduction of school bus routes to more centrally located facilities. Built in 1914, it was a one-room schoolhouse until 1953, and it operated until 1967.

The Pioneer School is sited in an open area with a commanding view of the Absaroka Range. The 1 1/2-story building is set on a concrete daylight basement. The hipped roof covers the original single room and the northern music room addition. A gabled roof covers the teacherage addition. A bell tower marks the entrance on the south side between the main block and the teacherage. The original building was designed by architect Curtis Oehme and built by H.P. Anderson. Central heating with a coal furnace was added in 1930. The teacherage, consisting of a living room-kitchen and a bedroom, was added in 1953, along with indoor plumbing. Vernon Drake designed a music room addition in 1956, while the school was further modernized and converted to fuel oil heat.

The student population varied between five and 28 students in grades 1 through 8 through 1957, after which grades 7 and 8 attended school in Belfrey, Montana. The school was deeded by the Powell School District in 1970 to the Pioneer Service Group as a community Center in 1970.
