= Elephant Head Lodge =

Historic house in Wyoming, United States

- U.S. National Register of Historic Places
- U.S. Historic district
- Location within Wyoming Location within the United States
- Location: 1170 North Fork Highway, Wapiti, Wyoming
- Nearest city: Cody, Wyoming
- Coordinates: 44°27′18″N 109°48′17″W
- Built: 1926
- Architect: Thurston, Harry & Josephine
- MPS: Guest Ranch along the Yellowstone Highway in the Shoshone National Forest
- NRHP reference No.: 03001107
- Added to NRHP: October 30, 2003

The Elephant Head Lodge is a guest ranch on the road to, and only 12 miles from, the east entrance of Yellowstone National Park, in Shoshone National Forest. The ranch includes two main lodges surrounded by support buildings and guest cabins. Beginning in 1926, the Elephant Head was developed by Buffalo Bill Cody's niece, Josephine Thurston and her husband Harry W. Thurston. The lodge was named after a distinctive rock formation that rises above the property.
