= Ralston Community Clubhouse =

- U.S. National Register of Historic Places
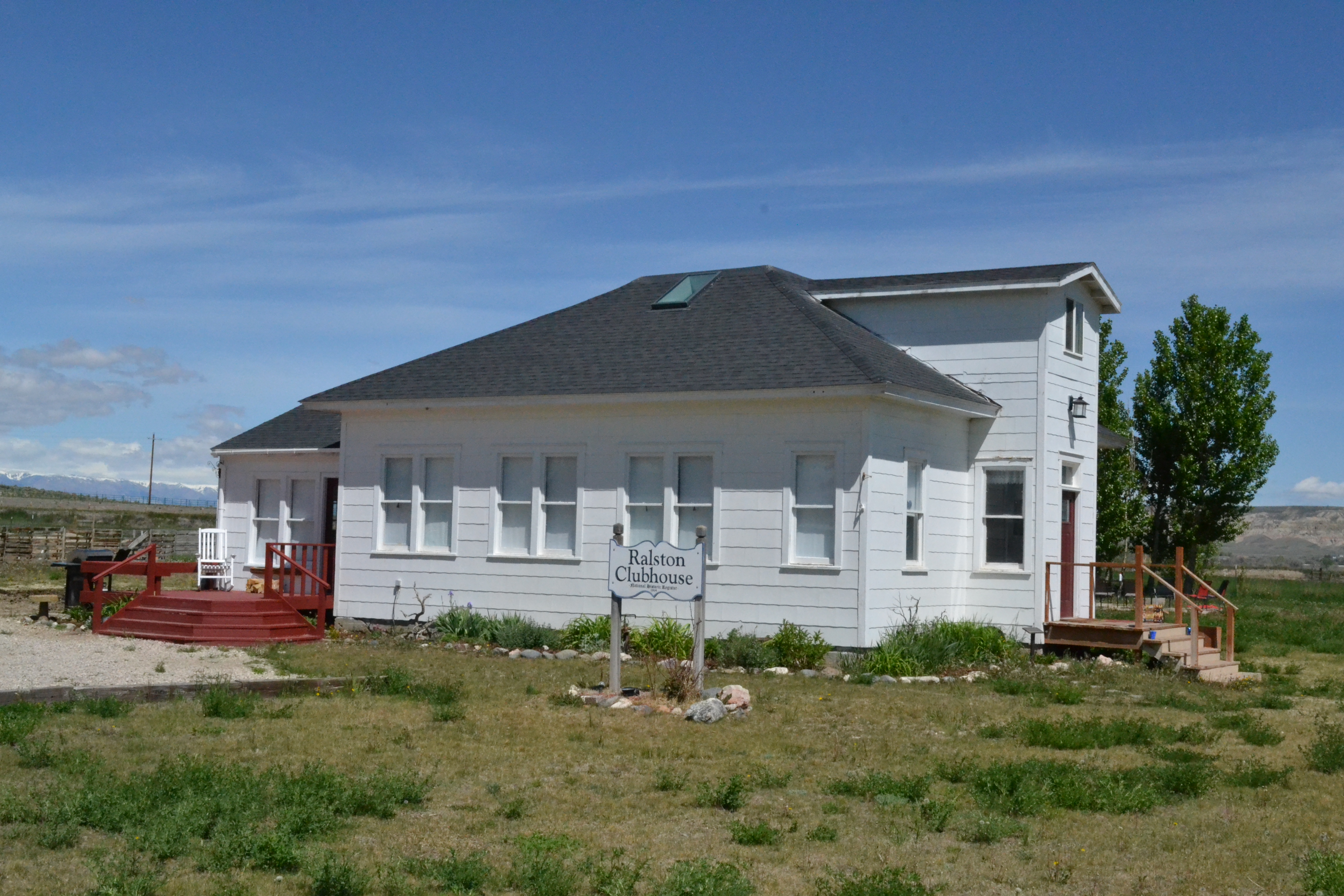

- Location within Wyoming Location within the United States
- Location: 969 Carbon St., Ralston, Wyoming
- Coordinates: 44°43′10.7″N 108°52′5″W
- Built: 1914
- Architectural style: One room Schoolhouse
- NRHP reference No.: 98000907
- Added to NRHP: July 23, 1998

The Ralston Community Clubhouse was built in 1914 as a community school in Ralston, Wyoming. It was abandoned as a school in 1922, when Ralston consolidated its school with the neighboring Powell school district. The Powell district offered the school to the Ralston Community Club in 1930. The clubhouse became the social center of Ralston, serving as a community meeting hall and polling place. It was particularly important to local women's organizations.

The clubhouse is a wood-frame building covered with asbestos shingles, on a concrete foundation. The one story building has a hip roof with a gable roof addition. The central entry vestibule extends beyond the eave level and is covered by a projecting hipped dormer-like roof to mark the main entrance, replacing the original belfry. The addition, built in 1951, contains the kitchen. An outhouse, divided into men's and women's sections, stands near the northeast corner of the clubhouse. Coal heat in the clubhouse was replaced with natural gas in 1968. The original wood clapboard siding was covered with asbestos shingles in 1951. At the same time the belfry and bell were removed and donated to the Presbyterian church in Powell.
