= Dead Indian Campsite =

Archeological site in Park County, Wyoming, USA

- U.S. National Register of Historic Places
- Location: Address restricted
- Nearest city: Cody, Wyoming
- NRHP reference No.: 74002030
- Added to NRHP: May 3, 1974

The Dead Indian Campsite is an archeological site in the Sunlight Basin of the Absaroka Range in Park County, Wyoming, United States. The site was found during the construction of the Sunlight Basin Road in 1967. The location was used as a butchering site, and excavations by the University of Wyoming in 1969 uncovered numerous stone tools, as well as the bones of elk, deer, mountain sheep, porcupine and wolf. A stone cairn was found to contain antler sets. The site was used in different eras for 4500 years.

The site was listed on the National Register of Historic Places in 1974.

== See also ==
- Dead Indian Pass
