= Wapiti Ranger Station =

- U.S. National Register of Historic Places
- U.S. National Historic Landmark
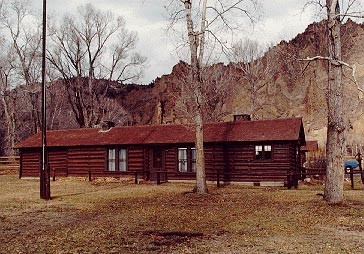
- Wapiti Ranger Station
- Location: 2285 U.S. Route 14/16/20, Wapiti, Wyoming
- Coordinates: 44°27′52″N 109°36′51.5″W
- Built: 1903
- Architect: W.H. Pierce
- NRHP reference No.: 66000759

Significant dates
- Added to NRHP: October 15, 1966
- Designated NHL: May 23, 1963

Wapiti Ranger Station is a ranger station in Shoshone National Forest west of Cody, Wyoming, United States. The station, the oldest in the United States Forest Service, has been used continuously since it was built in 1903. On May 23, 1963, Wapiti Ranger Station was designated as a National Historic Landmark, and placed on the National Register of Historic Places on October 15, 1966.

== Description and history ==
The Wapiti Ranger Station is 30 miles (48 km) west of Cody on the north side of U.S. Route 14/16/20, between Cody and the east entrance to Yellowstone National Park. The original 1903 building now stands amid a cluster of more modern Forest Service buildings, from which it is set off by a rail fence. It is a single-story log structure, with a low-pitch gabled roof. Modern extensions to the rear give the building a U shape, and its interior has been modernized, as it continues to serve an active role in forest management.

Shoshone National Forest was the first national forest to be created in the United States, in 1891. The forest was enlarged over the following decade, to the point where it administratively required division. The Wapiti Ranger Station was built in 1903 by W. H. Pierce, the first administrator of the forest's Shoshone division. The station was the first forest service ranger station built with federal funding. Constructed with native forest timber, the structure is maintained regularly, with some recent improvements – such as replacing some rotting timber – implemented in 2005.

A location called Wapiti Station is featured in the 2016 game Firewatch, which is set in the Shoshone National Forest. However, its depiction and location within the forest do not resemble Wapiti Ranger Station.

== See also ==
- List of National Historic Landmarks in Wyoming
- National Register of Historic Places listings in Park County, Wyoming
