= Dead Indian Creek (Wyoming) =

Stream in Park County, Wyoming, U.S.

Coordinates: 44°45′8.69″N 109°25′8.01″W

Dead Indian Creek is a stream in Park County, Wyoming, in the United States. It lies at the base of Dead Indian Pass.

According to tradition Dead Indian Creek was named for a Bannock Indian killed nearby.

Dead Indian Creek bisects the Dead Indian Campground.
