= Dead Injun Creek =

Coordinates: 44°11′21″N 119°19′30″W

Dead Injun Creek is a small stream in Grant County, Oregon, in the United States. The name Dead Injun commemorates a Native American (formerly called an Injun) who was killed in battle near the river's bank. The creek is within the South Fork John Day River drainage basin.
