= UXU Ranch =

- U.S. National Register of Historic Places
- U.S. Historic district
- Location within Wyoming Location within the United States
- Location: Park County, Wyoming, USA
- Nearest city: Wapiti, Wyoming
- Coordinates: 44°27′24″N 109°42′50″W
- Architect: Bob Rumsey
- MPS: Dude Ranches along the Yellowstone Highway in the Shoshone National Forest
- NRHP reference No.: 03000581
- Added to NRHP: May 24, 2003

The UXU Ranch is a historic dude ranch in Shoshone National Forest near Wapiti, Wyoming. The ranch began as a sawmill, as early as 1898. In 1929 Bronson Case "Bob" Rumsey obtained a permit from the U.S. Forest Service to operate a dude ranch on the property, using the sawmill headquarters building, a lodge, and tent cabins. Most of the current structures were built in the 1920s and 1930s from lumber milled on the site.

Initial accommodations were tent cabins, with permanent cabins built in the 1930s from local lumber sawn on site. For much of the ranch's history the only access to the lodge and cabins from the road was across a footbridge. A camelback truss bridge was relocated to the site in 1969 to provide vehicular access. The ranch has changed hands a number of times since the Bronson's tenure, but remains one of the most authentic examples of a working dude ranch in Wyoming.

The main lodge dates to the late 1920s. The irregular one story log building stands on a concrete and stone foundation. The lodge borrows details from the Old Faithful Inn for the entrance porch and deck. The interior features peeled log finishes. Guest cabins are typically log cabins on stone foundations. Other buildings from the period of significance include an outhouse and a root cellar.

The ranch was listed on the National Register of Historic Places in 2003. It continues to operate as a guest ranch.
