= Cody complex =

Paleo-Indian culture group

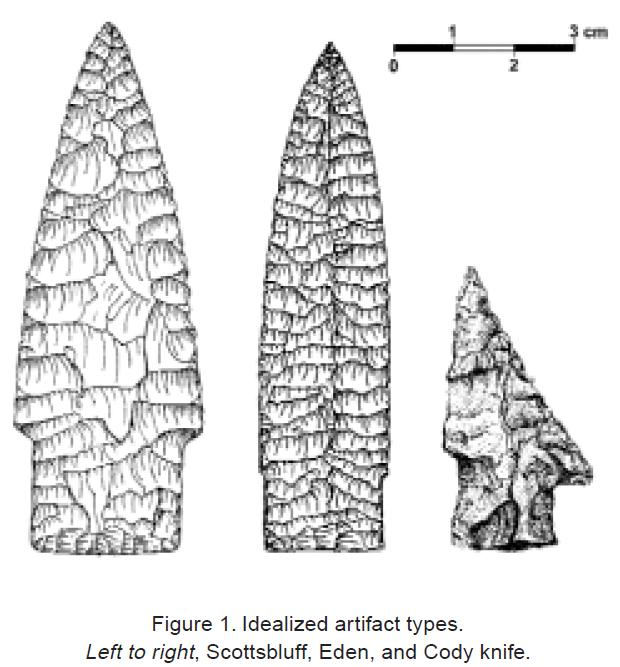
Cody complex projectile points and knife

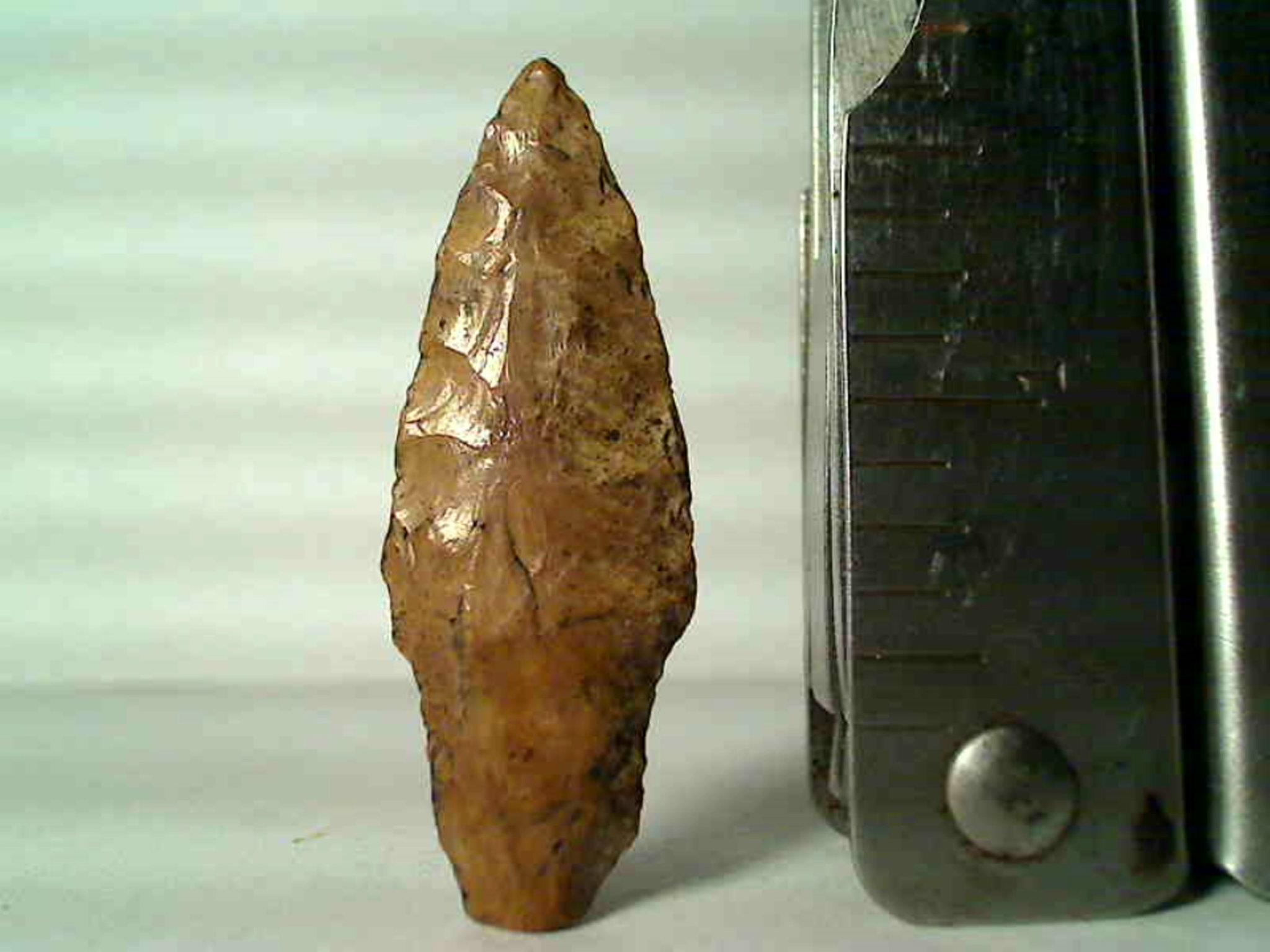
Salvaged Scottsbluff Tip

The Cody complex is a Paleo-Indian culture group first identified at a Bison antiquus kill site near Cody, Wyoming, in 1951. Points possessing characteristics of Cody Complex flaking have been found all across North America from Canada to as far south as Oklahoma and Texas.

The tradition is generally attributed to the North American, primarily in the High Plains portion of the American Great Plains. The discovery of the Cody complex broadened the understanding of late Paleo-Indian cultural traditions beyond the Folsom tradition. Most Cody complex sites were Bison antiquus kill and butcher sites, and sometime campsites.

The sites are distinguished by their campsites, tools and butchering process. The tools, dated between about 6,000 and 8,000 BC, include Cody knives and Scottsbluff and diamond-shaped Eden projectile points.

Archaeological sites at Yellowstone Lake show that the Cody complex visited present-day Yellowstone National Park during the summer months around 7300 BC, fishing and boating on the lake, hunting bear, deer, and bison, and obtaining obsidian from Obsidian Cliff. The climate conditions and remains suggest that the Cody people did not remain in Yellowstone during the winter and early spring.

== See also ==
- Prehistory of Colorado
- List of prehistoric sites in Colorado
  - Horner site, the type site for the complex
  - Jurgens Site, a kill site, campsite and residential area
  - Lamb Spring, a kill site
  - Olsen-Chubbuck Bison Kill Site, an example of large scale cooperative game drive system
- Plano cultures
