= Irma Hotel =

- U.S. National Register of Historic Places
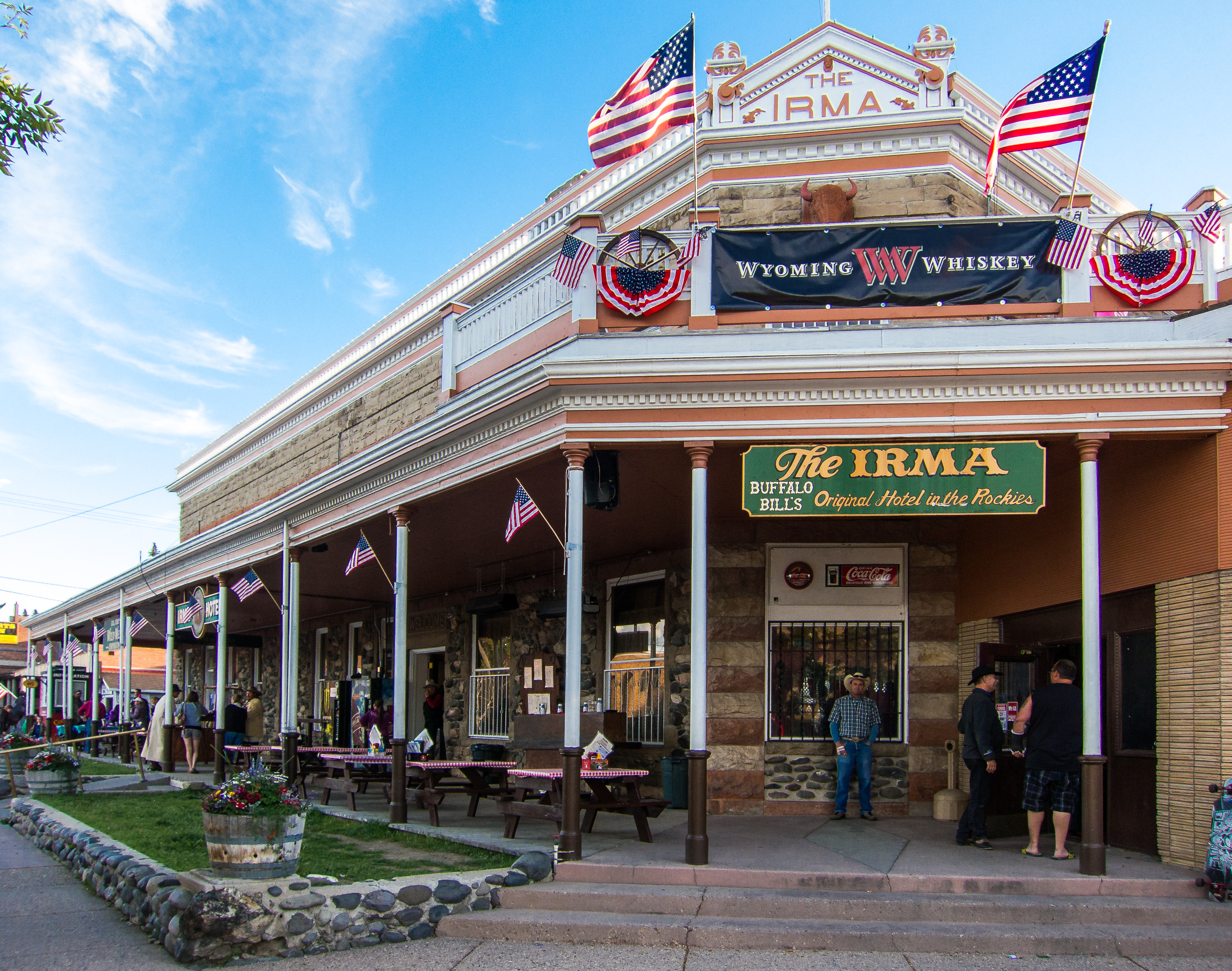

- Location within Wyoming Location within the United States
- Location: 1192 Sheridan Ave., Cody, Wyoming
- Coordinates: 44°31′32.70″N 109°3′52″W
- Built: 1902
- NRHP reference No.: 73001936
- Added to NRHP: April 03, 1973

The Irma Hotel is a landmark in Cody, Wyoming. It was built by William F. "Buffalo Bill" Cody, the city's co-founder and namesake who named it after his daughter Irma Cody. A focal point is a famous back bar made of cherry that was a gift given by Queen Victoria to Buffalo Bill.

The Irma opened with a party on November 18, 1902, to which Cody invited the press and dignitaries from as far away as Boston. The hotel quickly became the social center of Cody. In the meantime, Buffalo Bill was under pressure from creditors and was forced to sign over the hotel to his wife Louisa in 1913, who was at that time on bad terms with him. After Cody's death in 1917 the hotel was foreclosed upon and sold to Barney Link. Before the end of the year Link's estate sold the property back to Louisa, who kept it until she died in 1925. The new owners, Henry and Pearl Newell, gradually expanded the hotel, building an annex around 1930 on the west side to accommodate automobile-borne visitors. After her husband's death in 1940, Pearl Newell operated the hotel until her own death in 1965. She left the hotel's extensive collection of Buffalo Bill memorabilia to the Buffalo Bill Historical Center, and stipulated that proceeds from the estate be used as an endowment for the museum.

The Irma Hotel is still open for business as both a hotel and restaurant. It is included on the National Register of Historic Places, listed in 1973.
