= Dead Indian Pass =

Mountain pass in Wyoming, U.S.

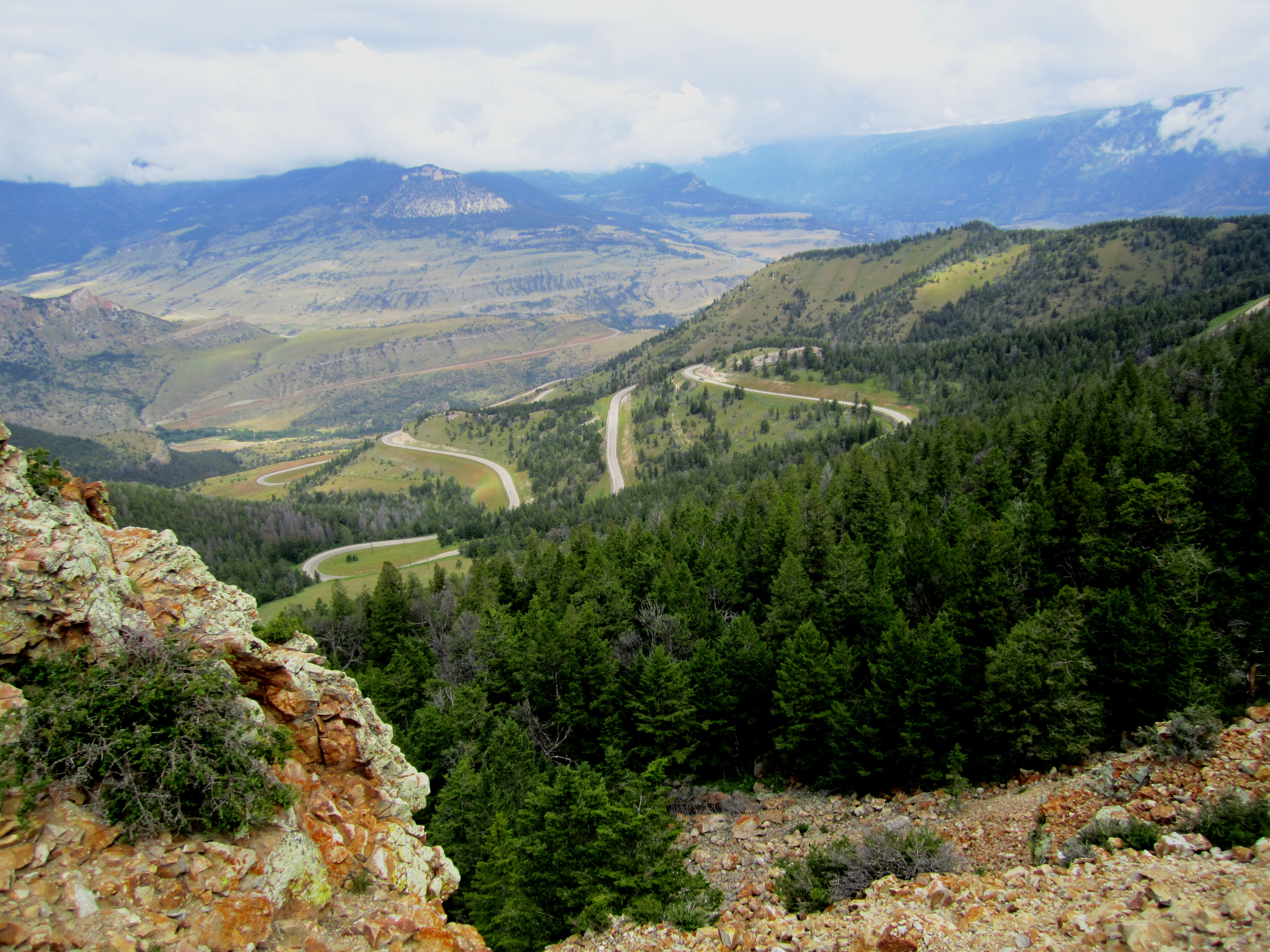
- The view from the top of Dead Indian Pass on the Chief Joseph Scenic Byway
- Interactive map of Dead Indian Pass
- Elevation: 8,071 ft (2,460 m)
- Traversed by: Wyoming Highway 296

Third Approach
- Location: Park County, Wyoming, United States
- Range: Rocky Mountains
- Coordinates: 44°44′37″N 109°23′06″W
- Topo map: USGS Dead Indian Meadows

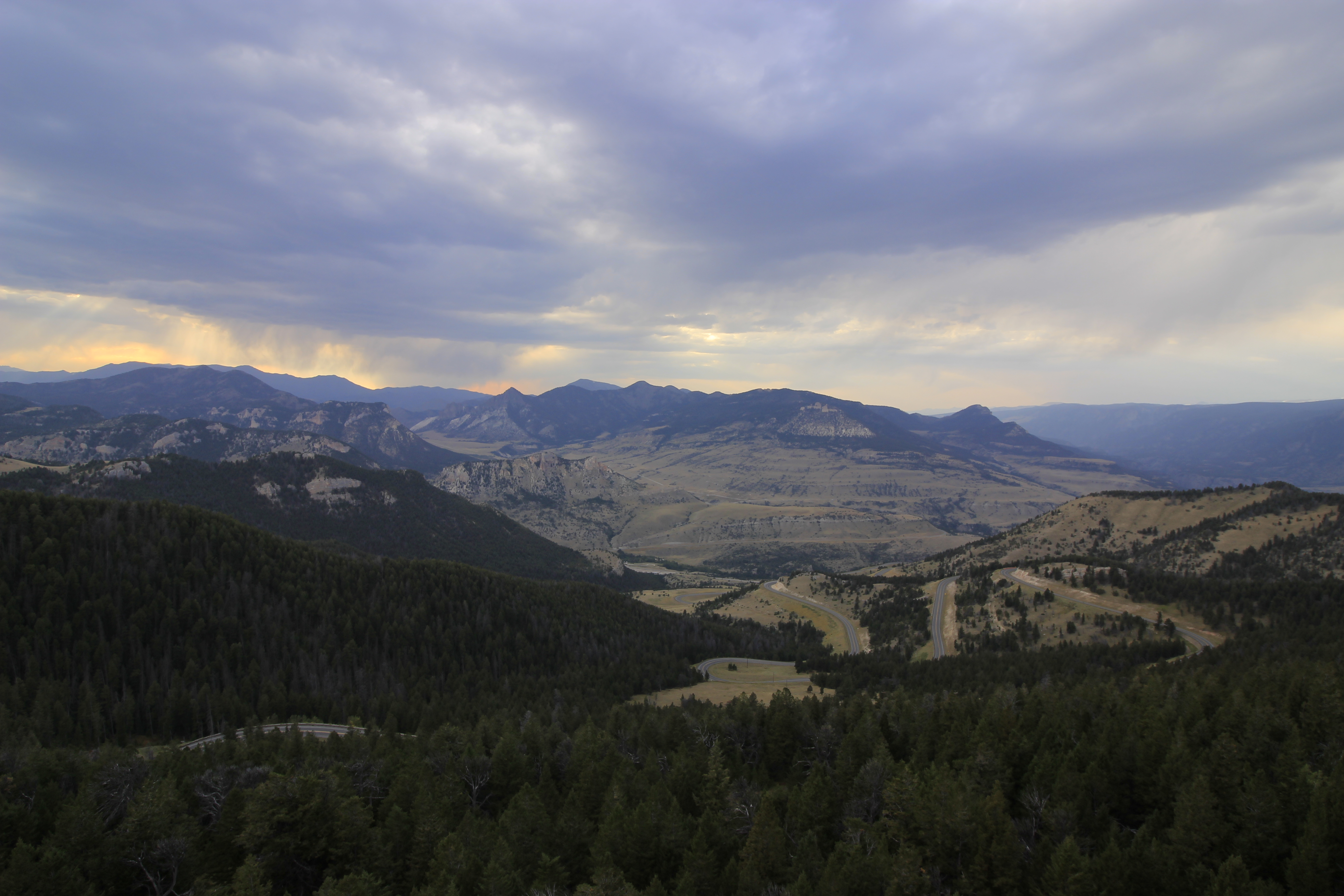

Dead Indian Pass (8,071 feet (2,460 m)) is a mountain pass on Wyoming Highway 296. The pass is located on Chief Joseph Scenic Byway and crosses the Absaroka Range.

Dead Indian Creek runs at the base of the pass. Near the pass are also Dead Indian Gulch, Dead Indian Mountain, and Dead Indian Mesa.

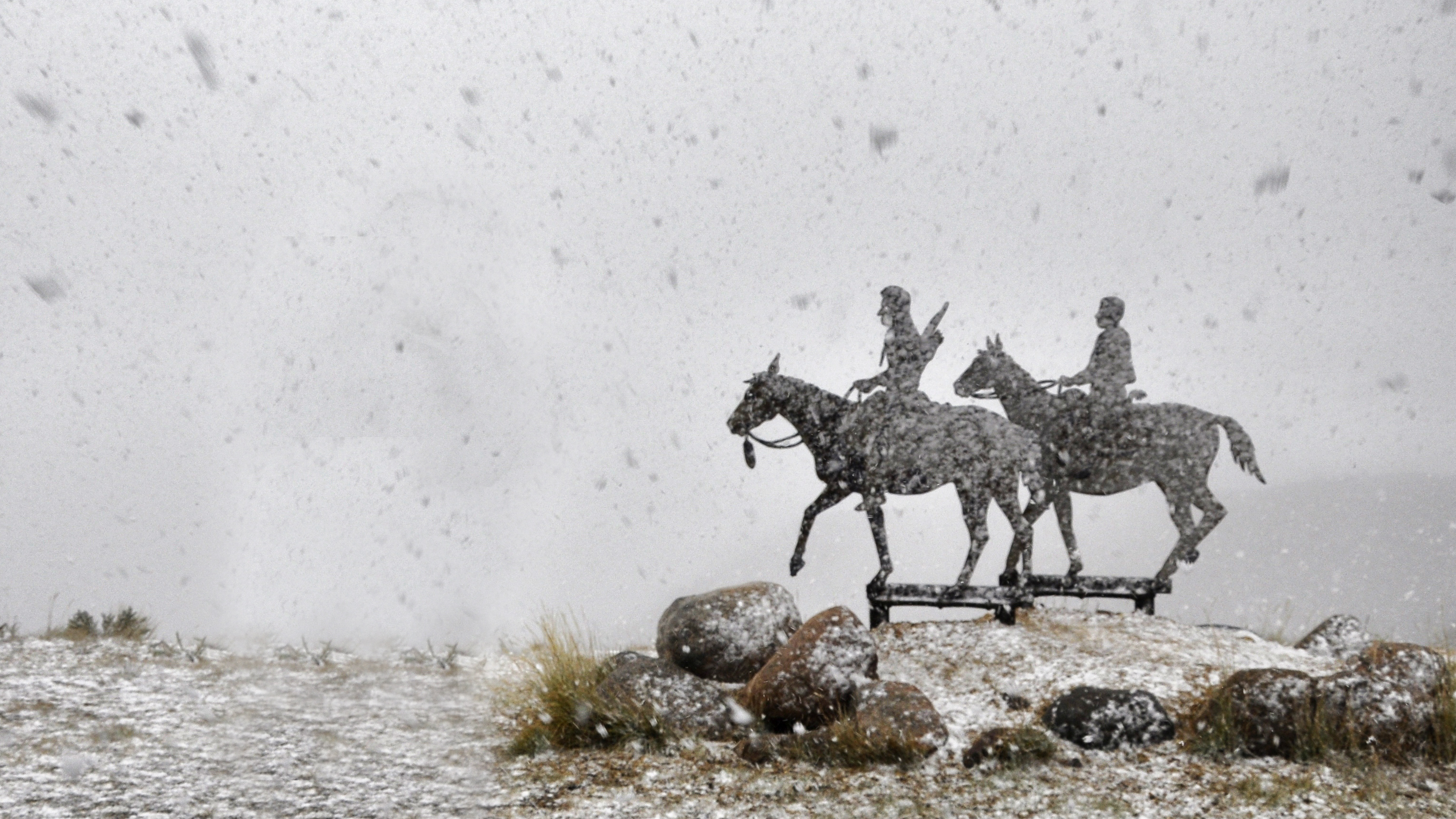
Dead Indian Overlook

== Flight of the Nez Perce ==
Dead Indian Pass is associated with the flight of the Nez Perce Indians during the Nez Perce War in 1877.

Pursued by several hundred soldiers led by General O.O. Howard, Chief Joseph led 700 Nez Perce men, women, and children and 2,000 horses through Yellowstone Park eastward and into the Absaroka Range. From the Absarokas the Indians looked for a route to the Great Plains. However, the U.S. army had anticipated that the Nez Perce would attempt to break out of the mountains onto the Plains and had stationed General Samuel D. Sturgis and 600 cavalry near the base of the mountains to intercept the Indians. Sturgis's forces were strategically placed where he could move quickly south or north toward known trails along Clarks Fork of the Yellowstone River.

Sturgis discounted the Clark's Fork exit from the mountains, "finding that no trail could possibly lead through it." The lower several miles of Clark's Fork passed through a narrow canyon with vertical walls.

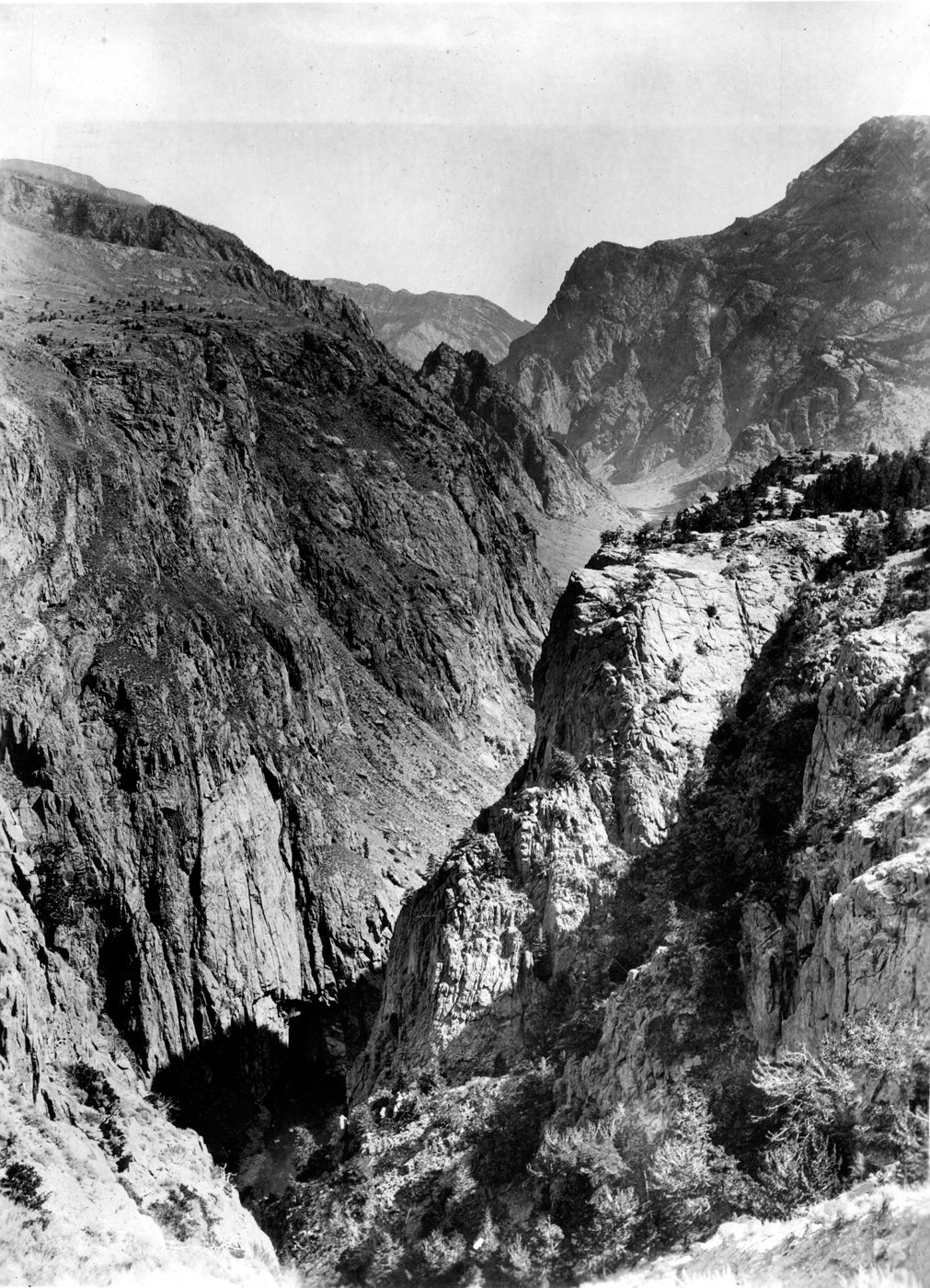
Clarks Fork Canyon. The Nez Perce descended from Dead Indian Pass into Clark's Fork Canyon via a narrow defile in the rock walls.

On September 8, 1877, the Nez Perce reached Dead Indian Pass, about six miles from Sturgis's force on the Plains below. Their advance scouts observed the soldiers far below awaiting their appearance. If the Indians took the open and easy route to reach the Plains, they would be easily visible. Instead, they attempted a difficult maneuver to mislead the soldiers. They feinted going south toward the Shoshone River by milling their horses in a big circle to kick up visible dust and sell Sturgis on the idea that they were heading south. Then, invisible to army scouts, they sneaked back north, concealed by heavy timber, and traversed Dead Indian Gulch down to the Clark's Fork River. Dead Indian Gulch was a narrow, steep-sided slit in the rock, dropping almost vertically for 1,000 feet and barely wide enough for two horses to go side-by-side. "In a cleanly executed maneuver," said a military historian, "the Nez Perce had countered an extremely serious threat and won a brilliant, though temporary respite."

Sturgis took the bait and led his soldiers away from the Clark's Fork and headed south to the Shoshone. The Nez Perce passed out onto the Great Plains unopposed. Sturgis quickly realized his error and turned around. On September 11, he met up with Howard, who had descended the Clark's Fork following the Nez Perce's route, but the two military forces were now two days and 50 miles behind the Nez Perce. The U.S. army would not finally corner and defeat the Nez Perce until nearly a month later at the Battle of Bear Paw.

== Origin of the name ==
There are two accounts of the naming of Dead Indian Pass. The first refers to the Nez Perce flight in 1877. A Nez Perce was reputedly killed near the pass, and it acquired the name. The second account states that in 1878, Col. Nelson A. Miles and his soldiers encountered a group of Bannock Indians. The Crow Indian Scouts killed a Bannock and buried him here.
