= Red Star Lodge and Sawmill =

- U.S. National Register of Historic Places
- U.S. Historic district
- Location within Wyoming Location within the United States
- Location: Park County, Wyoming, USA
- Nearest city: Cody, Wyoming
- Coordinates: 44°29′43″N 109°56′6″W
- Built: 1924
- Architect: Henry Dahlem
- MPS: Dude Ranches along the Yellowstone Highway in the Shoshone National Forest
- NRHP reference No.: 03001106
- Added to NRHP: October 30, 2003

The Red Star Lodge and Sawmill, also known as the Shoshone Lodge, is a dude ranch in Shoshone National Forest near the east entrance to Yellowstone National Park. Built between 1924 and 1950, the ranch includes a rustic log lodge surrounded by cabins and support buildings. What is now called the Shoshone Lodge is the most intact example of a dude ranch operation in the area.

== History ==
The Red Star Lodge occupies a 6.2 acres (2.5 ha) site leased from the U.S. Forest Service near US Highway 14-16-20, about 6 miles (9.7 km) from the east entrance to Yellowstone National Park. The lodge was built by Henry Dahlem, the first sheriff of Park County, Wyoming, beginning in 1924 and progressing by stages. The second quarter of the lodge was built in 1930, the third in 1935, and the final quarter in 1944. The lodge and other structures were built of D-shaped milled logs, produced on site at the Star Sawmill. Henry's son Harry took over management of the ranch in 1949 at a time when the Forest Service called the operation "Shoshone Lodge." Harry died in 1954, and his wife Betty managed the lodge with the help of their children Keith and Deborah. Keith Dahlem operates the nearby Sleeping Giant Ski Resort in the winter, while the Shoshone Lodge is open during the summer.

== Description ==
The irregularly shaped grand lodge is a two-story log structure set on a stone foundation. The east half of the building is built of hand-peeled round logs, while the west portion uses D-shaped milled logs produced on site. The lodge's roof is very complex, a result of the many additions. The main lodge is surrounded by guest cabins, employee dormitories and service buildings.
