= Absaroka Mountain Lodge =

- U.S. National Register of Historic Places
- U.S. Historic district
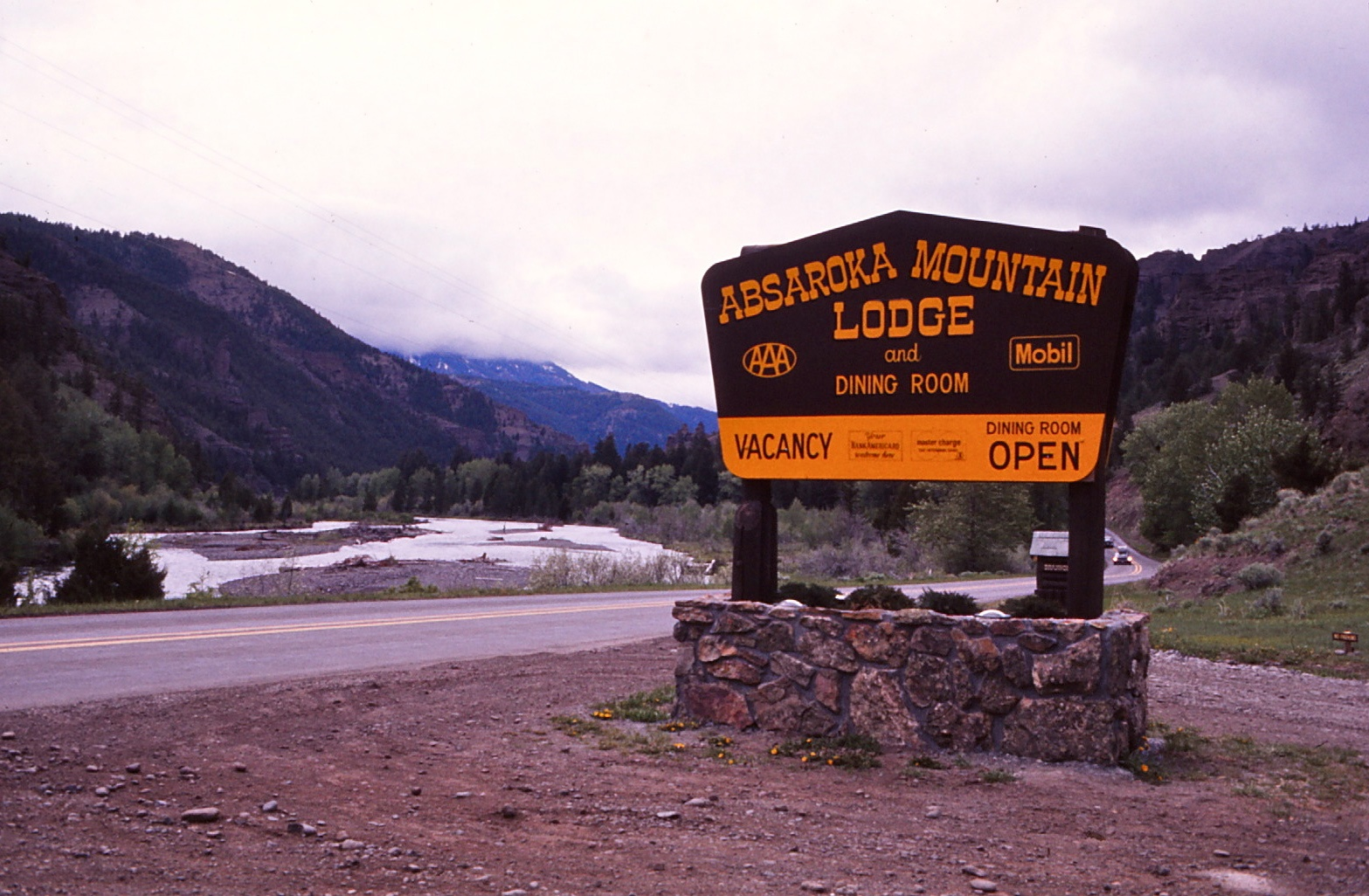
- Absaroka Mountain Lodge - June, 1975

- Location within Wyoming Location within the United States
- Location: Park County, Wyoming, USA
- Nearest city: Cody, Wyoming
- Coordinates: 44°27′25″N 109°47′29″W
- Built: 1917
- Architect: Earl F. Crouch
- Architectural style: Late 19th And Early 20th Century American Movements
- MPS: Dude Ranches along the Yellowstone Highway in the Shoshone National Forest
- NRHP reference No.: 03001105
- Added to NRHP: October 30, 2003

The Absaroka Mountain Lodge is a historic dude ranch located between Cody, Wyoming, and Yellowstone National Park in the Absaroka Range. The property in Shoshone National Forest was known as the Gunbarrel Lodge when it was established about 1917 by Earl F. Crouch. It received its enduring name in 1925, and was progressively expanded until the 1970s.
