= Clark, Wyoming =

Unincorporated community in Wyoming, US

Coordinates: 44°53′58″N 109°09′04″W

Clark is a community located approximately 30 miles (50 km) north of Cody on Wyoming Highway 120, in Park County, Wyoming, United States. Clark is unincorporated, and has no specific central "town site" per se, or town services. It is included in the Powell Zip Code area, which is approximately 30 miles (50 km) away, but has no other formal connection to Powell except the school district.

Clark is an unincorporated community with roughly 300 full-time residents (who share approximately 50 square miles (130 km^{2}) of real estate). Residents are a mix of farmers (irrigation water from local creeks and rivers), ranchers, and retirees who come to the area for the peaceful and relaxed atmosphere. Otherwise those working generally have employment in Powell or Cody. There is an elementary school in Clark, which is part of Park County School District #1 in Powell, but most junior high and high school students bus to Powell and the rest to Belfry, Montana.

Clark borders the Shoshone National Forest, state, and BLM-administered lands and Clark's Fork River/Canyon, making it a prime area for the outdoor enthusiast. Winters are moderately mild, with elevation averages of approximately 4,500 feet (1,400 m). The area is semi-arid high desert sagebrush plains with little rain or snowfall, averaging less than 10" per year, as the bordering mountains squeeze much of the moisture from the atmosphere. It was a wintering area for Indian tribes in the 19th century, due to the milder temperatures, relative lack of snow, abundant sunshine and game animals. Tipi rings can be found in the area.

== History ==
John Colter, a member of the Lewis and Clark Expedition, and later well known mountain man, broke off from the expedition on the return trip in 1806, explored the Yellowstone area, and spent a winter near the future Clark. Chief Joseph of the Nez Perce, running from the US Army in 1877, came through the area, and out the mouth of Clark's Fork Canyon on his way to Canada. There was a battle between General Nelson A. Miles and some Bannock Indians along Little Rock Creek. The creek was named for one of the scouts involved in that battle. For a thorough narrative and analysis of the battle, see Walpole, Kyle BENNETT BUTTE: "BIVOUAC OF THE DEAD" A Narrative of Miles' Fight on the Clark's Fork and Analysis of a Monumental Historical Mystery. Orig 1998. Digital iBooks publication 2013. Bennett Creek is named for a Captain Bennett who was killed in the engagement. Part of the saga of Earl Durrand, outlaw and backwoodsman, was played out in Clark.

Clark plus the Clark's Fork of the Yellowstone River were named for William Clark, of the Lewis and Clark Expedition.

== Wildlife ==
The area is home to pronghorn, mule and white-tailed deer, Rocky Mountain elk, black and grizzly bear, mountain goats, and bighorn sheep. Some western moose also live in and along the nearby mountains, as well as coyotes, northwestern wolves and mountain lions.

== Climate ==
According to the Köppen Climate Classification system, Clark has a warm-summer humid continental climate, abbreviated "Dfb" on climate maps. The hottest temperature recorded in Clark was 111 °F (44 °C) on July 13, 2026, while the coldest temperature recorded was −44 °F (−42 °C) on December 21, 1990.

Climate data for Clark, Wyoming, 1991–2020 normals, extremes 1961–present
Month	Jan	Feb	Mar	Apr	May	Jun	Jul	Aug	Sep	Oct	Nov	Dec	Year
Record high °F (°C)	67 (19)	72 (22)	82 (28)	89 (32)	95 (35)	104 (40)	111 (44)	103 (39)	103 (39)	90 (32)	78 (26)	69 (21)	111 (44)
Mean maximum °F (°C)	59.1 (15.1)	60.8 (16.0)	69.7 (20.9)	78.8 (26.0)	84.8 (29.3)	92.6 (33.7)	97.7 (36.5)	95.5 (35.3)	91.5 (33.1)	81.2 (27.3)	67.8 (19.9)	59.9 (15.5)	98.3 (36.8)
Mean daily maximum °F (°C)	37.4 (3.0)	40.0 (4.4)	50.5 (10.3)	57.4 (14.1)	66.0 (18.9)	76.1 (24.5)	85.2 (29.6)	83.5 (28.6)	73.4 (23.0)	59.5 (15.3)	46.8 (8.2)	37.6 (3.1)	59.5 (15.3)
Daily mean °F (°C)	22.0 (−5.6)	25.6 (−3.6)	35.7 (2.1)	43.5 (6.4)	52.8 (11.6)	62.0 (16.7)	69.5 (20.8)	67.4 (19.7)	57.6 (14.2)	44.2 (6.8)	32.4 (0.2)	22.8 (−5.1)	44.6 (7.0)
Mean daily minimum °F (°C)	6.5 (−14.2)	11.1 (−11.6)	20.9 (−6.2)	29.5 (−1.4)	39.7 (4.3)	48.0 (8.9)	53.8 (12.1)	51.3 (10.7)	41.9 (5.5)	28.9 (−1.7)	18.0 (−7.8)	8.1 (−13.3)	29.8 (−1.2)
Mean minimum °F (°C)	−16.9 (−27.2)	−10.8 (−23.8)	−0.1 (−17.8)	13.9 (−10.1)	24.5 (−4.2)	35.6 (2.0)	44.3 (6.8)	40.6 (4.8)	28.3 (−2.1)	12.5 (−10.8)	−5.1 (−20.6)	−14.8 (−26.0)	−24.6 (−31.4)
Record low °F (°C)	−37 (−38)	−38 (−39)	−39 (−39)	−7 (−22)	14 (−10)	27 (−3)	36 (2)	28 (−2)	16 (−9)	−12 (−24)	−30 (−34)	−44 (−42)	−44 (−42)
Average precipitation inches (mm)	0.25 (6.4)	0.30 (7.6)	0.33 (8.4)	0.74 (19)	1.41 (36)	1.30 (33)	0.79 (20)	0.66 (17)	0.78 (20)	0.58 (15)	0.34 (8.6)	0.24 (6.1)	7.72 (197.1)
Average snowfall inches (cm)	4.1 (10)	4.5 (11)	2.5 (6.4)	1.8 (4.6)	0.1 (0.25)	0.0 (0.0)	0.0 (0.0)	0.0 (0.0)	0.0 (0.0)	1.2 (3.0)	3.0 (7.6)	3.9 (9.9)	21.1 (52.75)
Average precipitation days (≥ 0.01 in)	2.6	3.4	3.4	5.4	8.5	8.1	6.9	5.8	5.2	4.5	3.5	3.4	60.7
Average snowy days (≥ 0.1 in)	2.6	3.1	2.0	1.4	0.2	0.0	0.0	0.0	0.1	0.9	1.9	3.1	15.3
Source 1: NOAA
Source 2: National Weather Service
