= Wapiti, Wyoming =

Wapiti
- Unincorporated community
- Location within the state of Wyoming Wapiti (the United States)
- Coordinates: 44°28′07″N 109°26′16″W
- Country: United States
- State: Wyoming
- County: Park
- Elevation: 5,601 ft (1,707 m)
- Time zone: UTC-7 (Mountain (MST))
  - Summer (DST): UTC-6 (MDT)
- ZIP codes: 82450
- GNIS feature ID: 1603972

Wapiti is an unincorporated community in Park County, Wyoming, United States. It is situated along the North Fork of the Shoshone River in Shoshone National Forest, between Cody and the eastern entrance of Yellowstone National Park. The location is named after the Cree Indian word for elk. The name wapiti is also used exclusively for the descendants of elk introduced to New Zealand by President Roosevelt in 1905.

It is the location of the Wapiti Ranger Station, a U.S. National Historic Landmark. It has a post office with the ZIP code 82450. Public education in the community of Wapiti is provided by Park County School District #6.

The Smith Mansion, a structure built by hand by engineer Francis Lee Smith, is located in Wapiti. Smith took up residence in the home once the first floor was complete but never stopped construction, adding new floors, rooms, and features until he died 12 years later. In this respect, it is similar to the Winchester Mystery House. Smith died in 1992 after falling from an upper level.

== Climate ==
According to the Köppen Climate Classification system, Wapiti has a cold semi-arid climate, abbreviated "BSk" on climate maps. The hottest temperature recorded in Wapiti was 100 °F (38 °C) on July 14, 2005, while the coldest temperature recorded was −38 °F (−39 °C) on December 21, 1990.

Climate data for Wapiti, Wyoming, 1991–2020 normals, extremes 1989–2018
Month	Jan	Feb	Mar	Apr	May	Jun	Jul	Aug	Sep	Oct	Nov	Dec	Year
Record high °F (°C)	64 (18)	67 (19)	73 (23)	80 (27)	88 (31)	93 (34)	100 (38)	98 (37)	91 (33)	85 (29)	73 (23)	65 (18)	100 (38)
Mean maximum °F (°C)	56.1 (13.4)	57.3 (14.1)	64.9 (18.3)	73.5 (23.1)	79.6 (26.4)	85.7 (29.8)	92.5 (33.6)	90.9 (32.7)	85.9 (29.9)	77.0 (25.0)	63.5 (17.5)	55.6 (13.1)	93.2 (34.0)
Mean daily maximum °F (°C)	38.6 (3.7)	39.2 (4.0)	46.9 (8.3)	53.4 (11.9)	62.4 (16.9)	72.5 (22.5)	82.7 (28.2)	81.4 (27.4)	71.1 (21.7)	57.3 (14.1)	45.4 (7.4)	37.5 (3.1)	57.4 (14.1)
Daily mean °F (°C)	28.6 (−1.9)	28.3 (−2.1)	35.6 (2.0)	41.2 (5.1)	49.7 (9.8)	58.4 (14.7)	67.0 (19.4)	65.4 (18.6)	56.7 (13.7)	45.2 (7.3)	35.2 (1.8)	28.1 (−2.2)	44.9 (7.2)
Mean daily minimum °F (°C)	18.7 (−7.4)	17.4 (−8.1)	24.3 (−4.3)	29.0 (−1.7)	37.0 (2.8)	44.2 (6.8)	51.3 (10.7)	49.4 (9.7)	42.3 (5.7)	33.1 (0.6)	25.0 (−3.9)	18.7 (−7.4)	32.5 (0.3)
Mean minimum °F (°C)	−9.8 (−23.2)	−4.7 (−20.4)	3.3 (−15.9)	14.8 (−9.6)	24.1 (−4.4)	33.5 (0.8)	42.1 (5.6)	39.7 (4.3)	27.7 (−2.4)	15.9 (−8.9)	0.9 (−17.3)	−6.1 (−21.2)	−19.7 (−28.7)
Record low °F (°C)	−28 (−33)	−28 (−33)	−13 (−25)	5 (−15)	19 (−7)	29 (−2)	36 (2)	20 (−7)	22 (−6)	−1 (−18)	−19 (−28)	−38 (−39)	−38 (−39)
Average precipitation inches (mm)	0.50 (13)	0.42 (11)	0.50 (13)	1.08 (27)	1.43 (36)	1.44 (37)	0.85 (22)	0.84 (21)	1.11 (28)	0.94 (24)	0.62 (16)	0.61 (15)	10.34 (263)
Average snowfall inches (cm)	5.7 (14)	3.9 (9.9)	4.3 (11)	4.4 (11)	0.7 (1.8)	0.0 (0.0)	0.0 (0.0)	0.0 (0.0)	0.2 (0.51)	3.6 (9.1)	4.1 (10)	3.7 (9.4)	30.6 (76.71)
Average precipitation days (≥ 0.01 in)	3.1	3.4	4.4	6.0	7.3	7.1	5.3	5.9	4.2	4.6	4.1	3.8	59.2
Average snowy days (≥ 0.1 in)	2.4	2.5	2.4	1.8	0.3	0.0	0.0	0.0	0.1	1.4	2.1	3.0	16.0
Source 1: NOAA
Source 2: National Weather Service (mean maxima and minima 1991–2005)
