= Boutell =

Boutell or Boutelle is a surname. It may refer to:

== Persons ==
Boutell

- Charles Boutell (1812–1877), an English archaeologist and heraldic scholar
- Elizabeth Boutell (1650–1715), a British actress
- Henry Sherman Boutell (1856–1926), an American lawyer and diplomat
- Mary E. C. Boutell, illustrator from the United Kingdom
- Sir Francis Hepburn Chevallier-Boutell (1851–1937), British engineer and sports manager

Boutelle

- Charles A. Boutelle (1839–1901), American seaman, shipmaster, naval officer, Civil War veteran, newspaper editor, publisher
- Frazier Boutelle (1840–1924), US Army officer, fighting in the Civil War and the Indian Wars and working as a recruiter in World War I. Later Superintendent of Yellowstone National Park
- Paul Boutelle (1934–2016), American politician, Socialist Workers Party candidate for U.S. vice president in 1968 with presidential candidate Fred Halstead

== Others ==
- Boutell-Hathorn House, historic house and farm in Wilmington, Massachusetts
