= Fort Yellowstone =

United States historic place in Yellowstone National Park

- U.S. National Register of Historic Places
- U.S. National Historic Landmark District
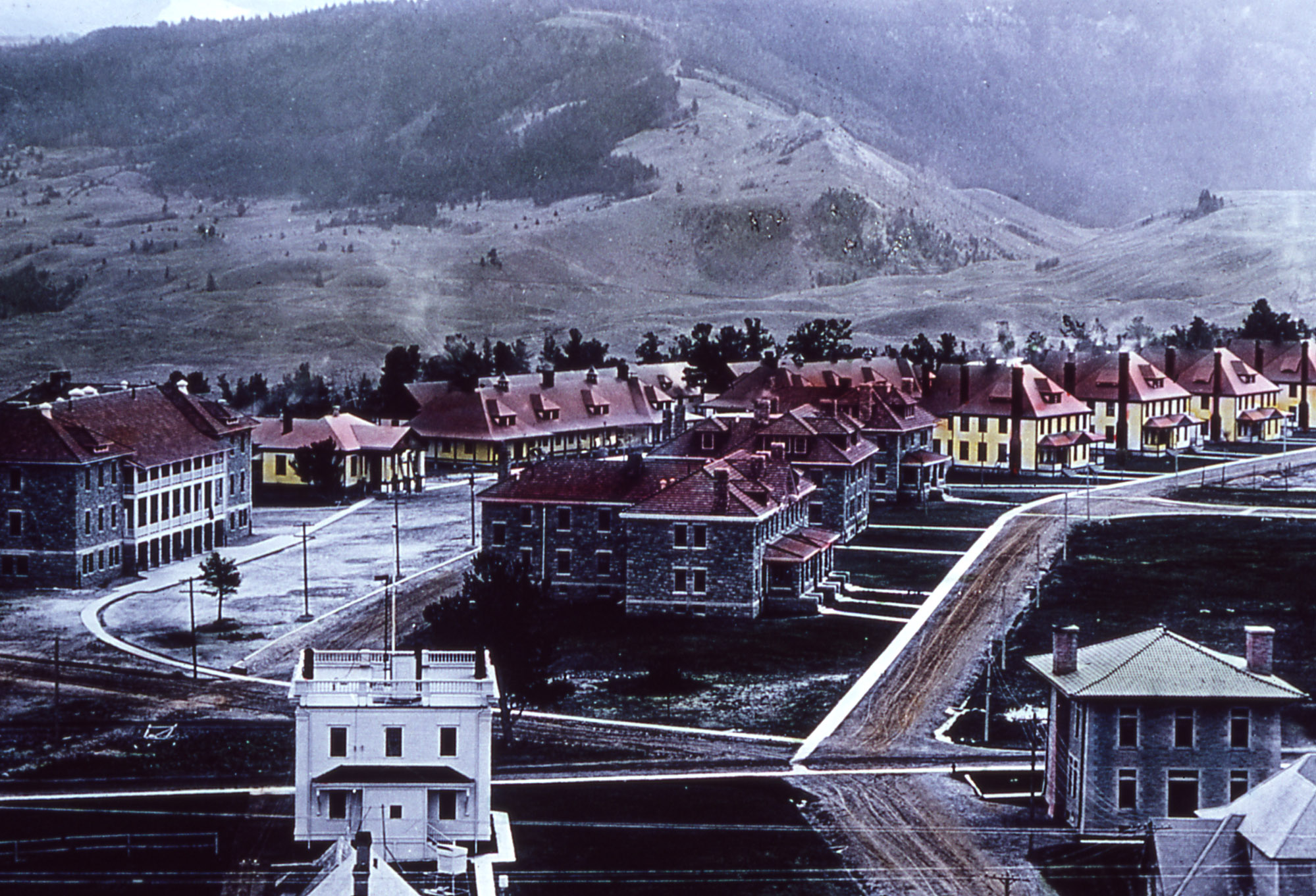
- Fort Yellowstone, circa 1910

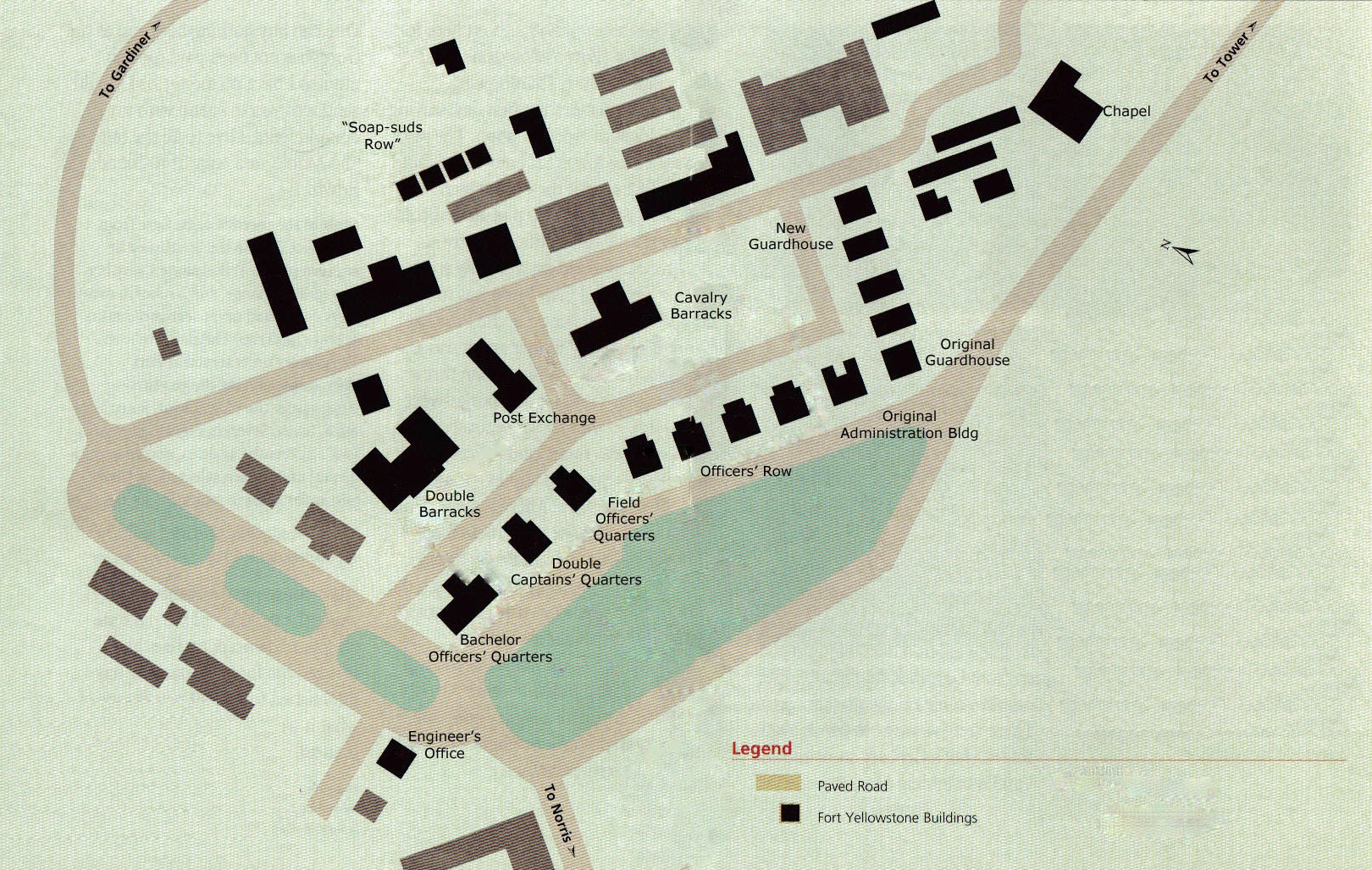
- Fort Yellowstone map
- Location: Yellowstone National Park, Park County, Wyoming, United States
- Nearest city: Gardiner, Montana
- Coordinates: 44°58′30″N 110°41′53″W
- Built: 1891
- Architect: US Army Chief Quartermaster, Dakota; Reed and Stem, Robert Reamer
- Architectural style: Colonial Revival
- NRHP reference No.: 03001032

Significant dates
- Added to NRHP: July 31, 2003
- Designated NHLD: July 31, 2003

Fort Yellowstone was a U.S. Army fort, established in 1891 at Mammoth Hot Springs in Yellowstone National Park. Yellowstone was designated in 1872 but the Interior Department was unable to effectively manage the park. Administration was transferred to the War Department in August 1886 and General Philip Sheridan sent a company of cavalry to Mammoth Hot Springs to build a cavalry post. The army originally called the post Camp Sheridan in honor of General Sheridan but the name was changed to Fort Yellowstone in 1891 when construction of the permanent fort commenced. The army administered the park until 1918 when it was transferred to the newly created National Park Service. The facilities of Fort Yellowstone now comprise the Yellowstone National Park headquarters, the Horace Albright Visitor Center and staff accommodations.

Between the years 1891 and 1913, a total of 60 structures were made at Fort Yellowstone, of which 35 were still in existence one hundred years later. The fort was built in two major construction waves. During the first construction period from 1891 to 1897, mainly wood-framed buildings in what has been referred to as "cottage style" were built. A few of them had Colonial Revival architectural elements. A second construction wave began in 1908 and concluded in 1913. These structures were primarily built from locally quarried sandstone. Many of the structures from the later construction period are now used as administrative offices, residences for National Park Service employees, museums and a visitor center. Beyond the immediate confines of the fort, cabins were constructed for use by small detachments of army personnel while on patrol throughout the park.

Besides the buildings of Fort Yellowstone, the army left a legacy of policies and practices that served as precedents for the future National Park Service management of national parks. The army military commanders implemented backcountry patrols, wildlife protection and management, and protection of natural features. Army educational programs were later adopted by the National Park Service as part of their resource management. The army effectively implemented law enforcement priorities and developed a ranger force that provided for prosecution and punishment of those engaged in illegal activity in the national parks. The National Park Service carried over a version of the campaign hat worn by members of the army during the last years of their management of Yellowstone National Park for use by Park Rangers.

== History ==
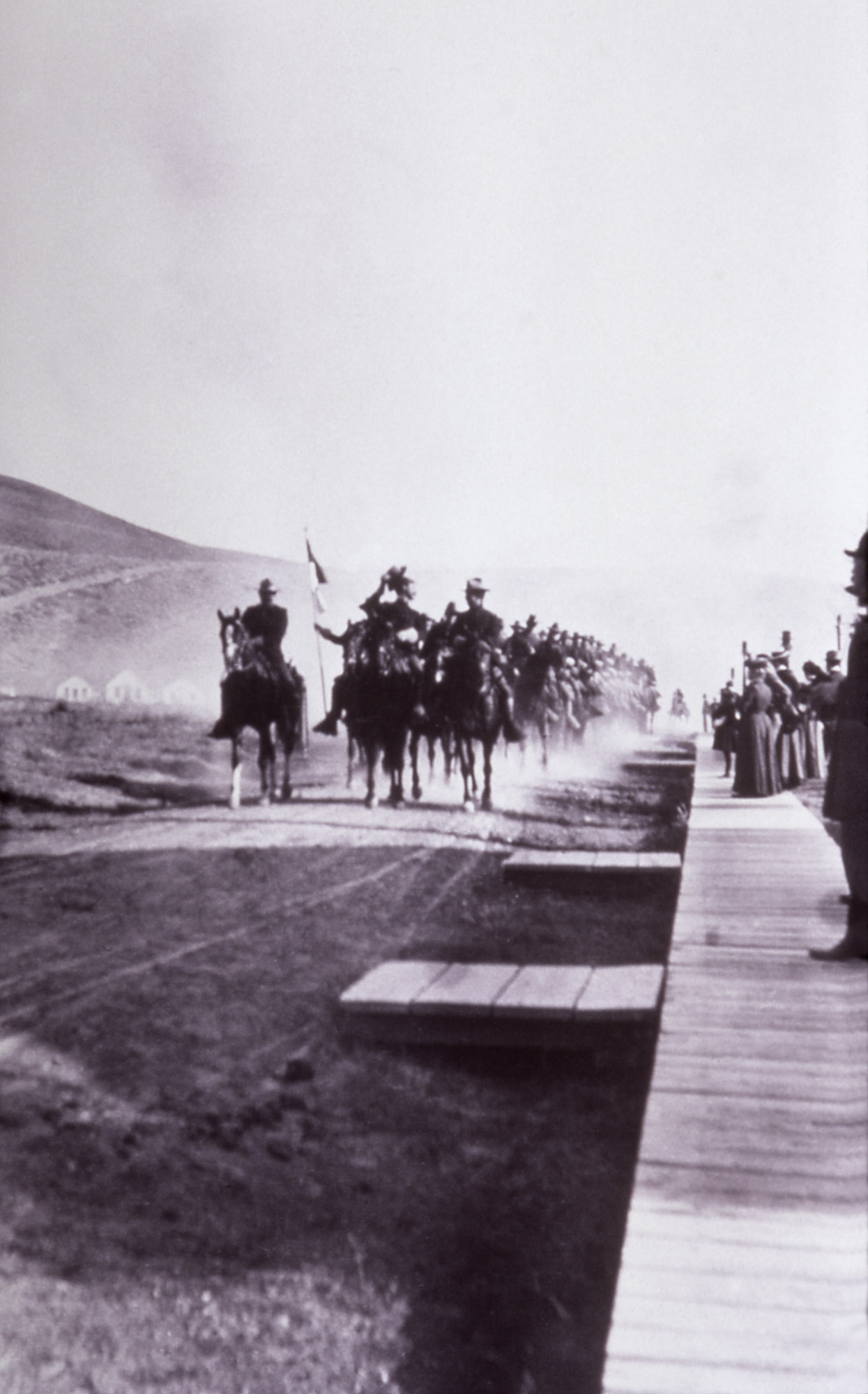
Company M, 1st Cavalry rides into Mammoth, 1886

More than 40 years before the creation of the National Park Service, Yellowstone National Park was established on March 1, 1872, as the world's first national park. Between 1872 and 1886, the park was administered by the Interior Department and was managed by a civilian superintendent with limited resources or legal authority to maintain and protect the park's natural features and wildlife, or to deal with poaching, vandalism and other destructive activities. Over the next decade, special interest groups such as concessionaires, railroad and mining interests attempted to commercialize and privatize park lands. The poorly funded Interior Department was unable to prevent degradation of the park and in some circumstances, was complicit with special interest groups. Senator George Vest led efforts to prevent railroads and other special interests from misusing the resource, and along with other members of Congress believed that only the military could effectively protect the park. A study of the situation and amendments to the Yellowstone Park Act proposed by Senator Vest resulted in the Sundry Civil Appropriations Bill of 1883 which allowed the Interior Department to transfer control of the park to the War Department, thereby protecting Yellowstone from schemes to commercialize the park.

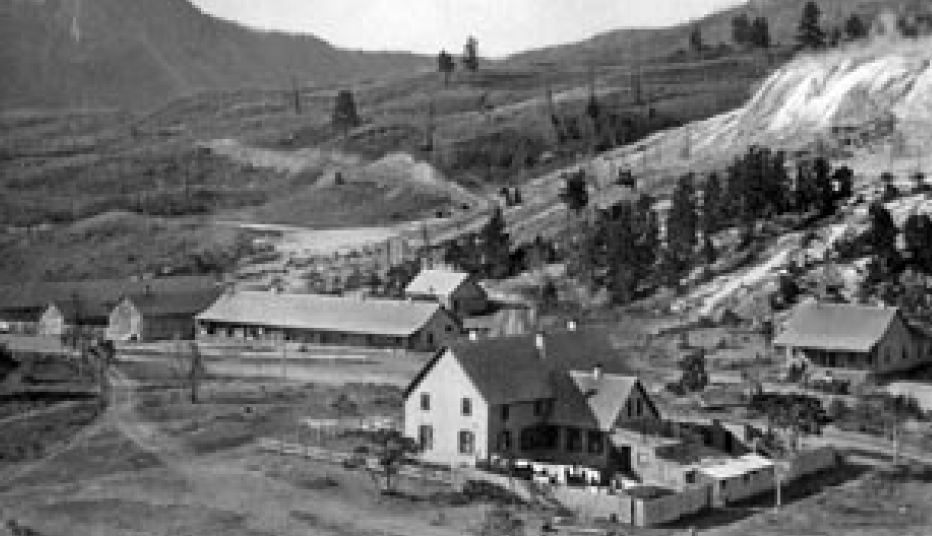
Camp Sheridan, circa 1900

In August 1886, Lieutenant General Philip Sheridan sent Company M, 1st U.S. Cavalry to the Park, where they established Camp Sheridan, named after General Sheridan, at Mammoth Hot Springs. Camp Sheridan consisted of an arrangement of temporary facilities at the base of Capitol Hill just east of the Mammoth Hot Springs travertine terraces. None of the facilities that comprised Camp Sheridan remain as they were all removed over the years.

Congress appropriated funds for the establishment of a permanent fort in 1891, and the Interior Department allocated land just north of Camp Sheridan for permanent facilities. Camp Sheridan was renamed Fort Yellowstone on May 11, 1891. The army continued to use Fort Yellowstone until they turned over control of the park and the fort to the newly formed National Park Service in October 1918. (Note: Although the National Park Service was created in 1916 and the U.S. Army initially withdrew from the park, the transition was chaotic and the Department of the Interior was unable to sustain the control the army had established. The Army returned in June 1917 and remained until a more stable transition could take place in October 1918.)

Fort Yellowstone is a National Historic Landmark District that has 40 contributing buildings, two contributing structures, and two contributing sites. The district was added to the National Register of Historic Places on July 31, 2003 for its significance in conservation, military, politics and government from 1888 to 1918. The fort, along with concessionaire facilities that were built after the National Park Service assumed management of the park, comprise what is collectively known as the Mammoth Hot Springs Historic District.

== Facilities ==
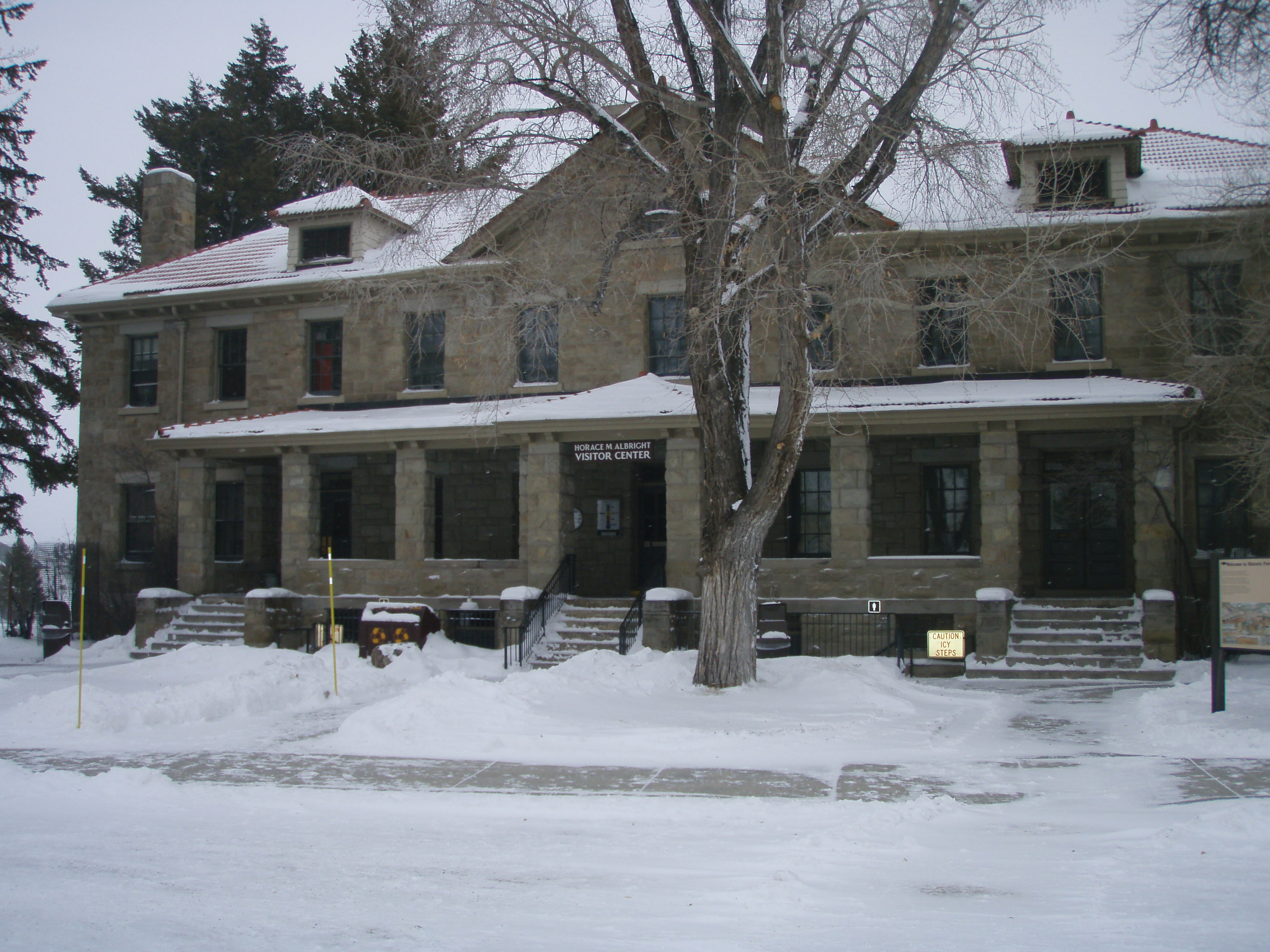
Bachelor Officers Quarters

Fort Yellowstone was constructed between 1891 and 1913 on the eastern edge of the Mammoth Hot Springs terraces, southeast of the present Mammoth Hotel, at a cost of approximately $700,000 ($16 million in 2013 dollars). By 1905, three more troops of cavalry had been added to the original Company M contingent of 50 soldiers, and during this period the fort facilities were almost continuously expanded to meet the requirements of park administration, ordinary cavalry training, and growing numbers of visitors.

The initial wave of construction between 1891–97 was representative of typical army posts of the period. Like other western military posts, the earliest buildings erected at Fort Yellowstone were constructed according to quartermaster general standardized plans. In design, they were of a generally spartan appearance with a few Colonial Revival style domestic elements, described by the army as "cottage style". The buildings were of one to two-and-a-half stories in height, and of frame construction with drop siding and stone foundations, with evenly spaced double-hung sash windows and prominent porches.

A second phase of building and upgrades started in 1908 which resulted in the prominent architecture visible at Fort Yellowstone in the 21st century. Built from locally quarried sandstone, these buildings defined Fort Yellowstone. The most prominent of the structures built in the later period is the Horace Albright Visitor Center which was originally the bachelor officers' quarters (Bldg 1). Each historic building in the fort and the park was assigned an official number, with the original bachelor officers' quarters being building number 1. Architects Reed and Stem and Robert Reamer along with the U.S. Army Office of the Chief Quartermaster, Department of Dakota participated in the design of many of the facilities. Engineer facilities and landscaping were designed by Captain Hiram M. Chittenden of the U.S. Corps of Engineers.

=== Initial construction period (1891–1907) ===
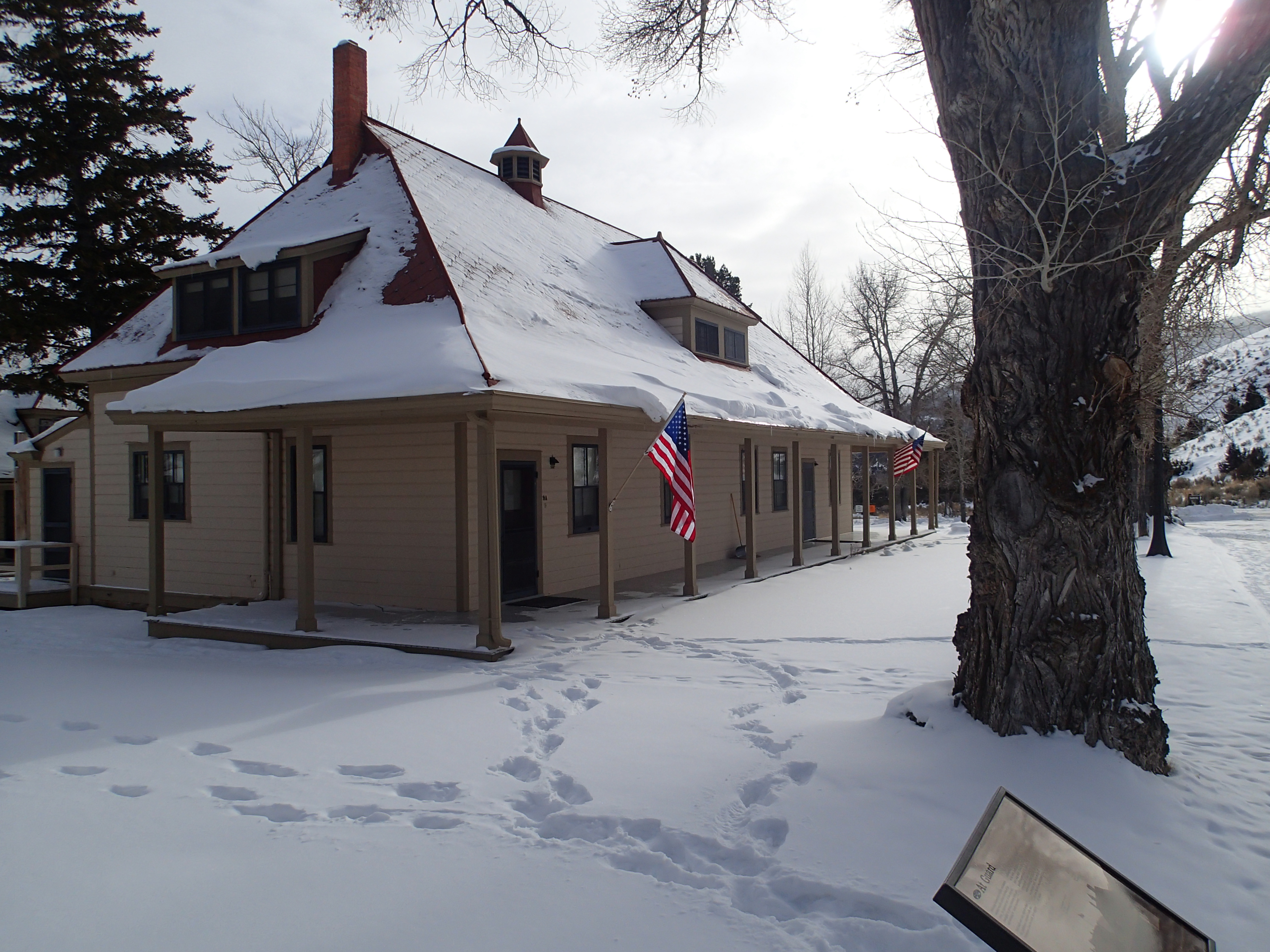
Original guardhouse

The first building constructed at Fort Yellowstone was the guardhouse (Bldg 9) at the southwest corner of the fort. In 1891, visitors traveled the lower Mammoth road through what is now the main residential area for park personnel. The guardhouse was the first building they encountered in the Mammoth area and there was always a sentry on duty to check visitors entering the park. The building is now a private residence. The original fort administration building (Bldg 8) was located immediately next to the guardhouse and is now also a private residence. Of the twelve buildings constructed in 1891, the most prominent are two of the four double officers' quarters (Bldgs 6 and 7) which front the old parade ground. Other buildings constructed in 1891 included a 60-man barracks, a commissary storehouse (Bldg 10), a quartermaster storehouse (Bldg 11), a granary (Bldg 12), a bakery (Bldg 24), a stable (Bldg 25) and the first two of four non-commissioned officers' (NCO) quarters (Bldgs 30 and 33). These NCO quarters became known as "soap-suds row' because many of the NCO wives were former army laundresses who supplemented their husbands' income by doing laundry for post personnel.

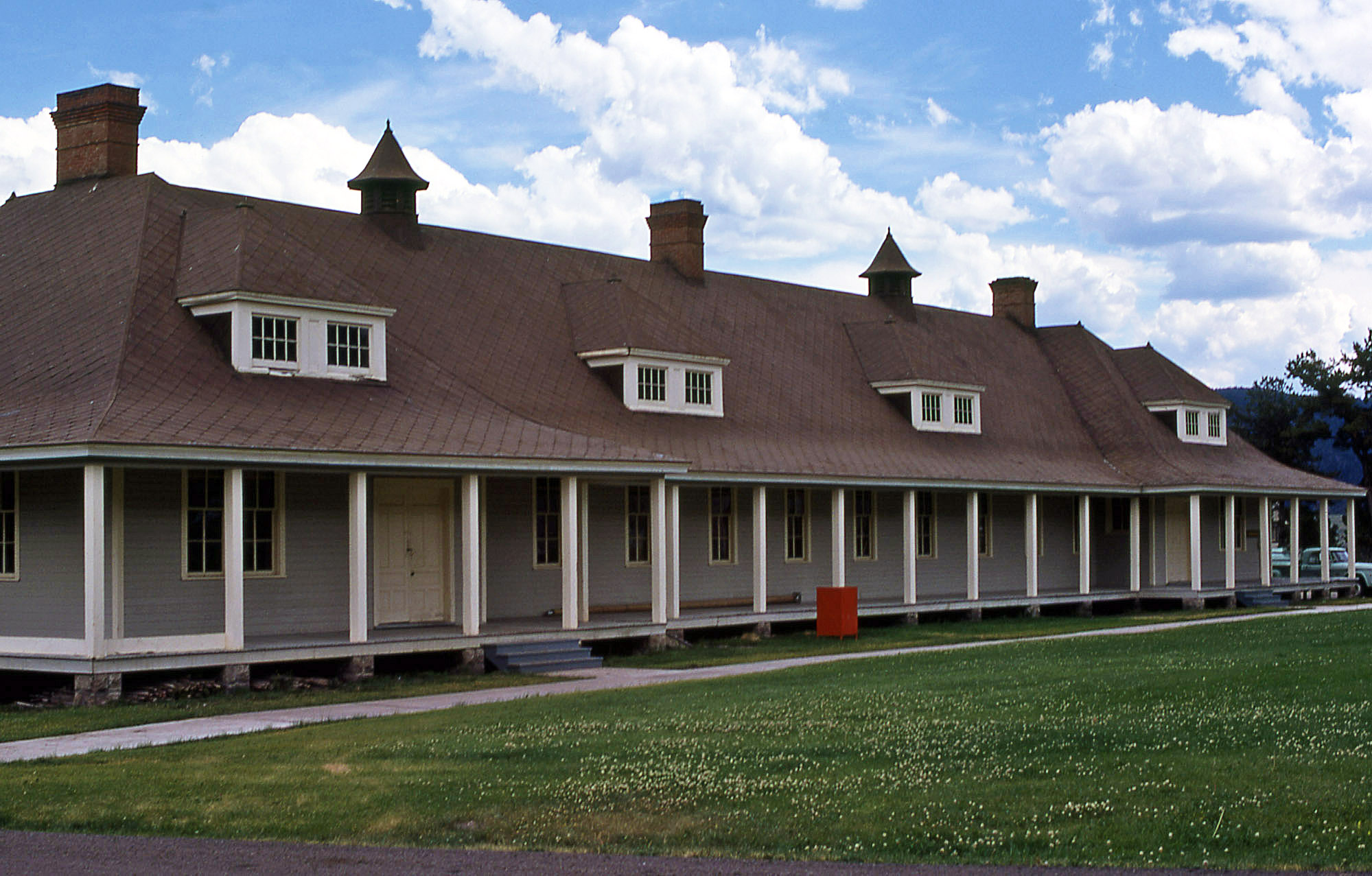
Cavalry barracks built in 1899

A number of significant buildings were added to the fort from 1893 to 1899 including a 10-bed hospital, quarters for hospital personnel (Bldg 14), and a large hay shed (Bldg 20) which were constructed in areas behind officers' row in 1894. Of these structures, only the hospital quarters building remains and is now used as a private residence. The most significant building constructed in 1895 was the U.S. Commissioner's office, which included a jail and residence for the U.S. Marshal (Bldg 49). The first commissioner was Judge John W. Meldrum who served the army and National Park Service until 1935 from this building. Located well west of the rest of the fort, this was the first stone building within the fort. It was a one-and-a-half-story rock-faced sandstone dwelling with gable-on-hip roof, through-the-cornice dormers and a full-width porch. The ground floor of the house contained the jail, office, and living quarters while bedrooms were situated on the second floor. The structure is used today as a private residence. The building was funded with the passage of the Lacey Act of 1894. Sponsored by U.S. Representative John F. Lacey, the Lacey Act was "An Act To protect the birds and animals in Yellowstone National Park, and to punish crimes in said park, and for other purposes."

Construction during this period also included two double officers' quarters (Bldgs 4 and 5) which completed "officers' row" in 1893. Two NCO quarters (Bldgs 31 and 32) were added to "soap-suds row" in 1897 and the distinctive cavalry barracks (Bldg 27), which now houses administrative offices, was constructed in 1899.

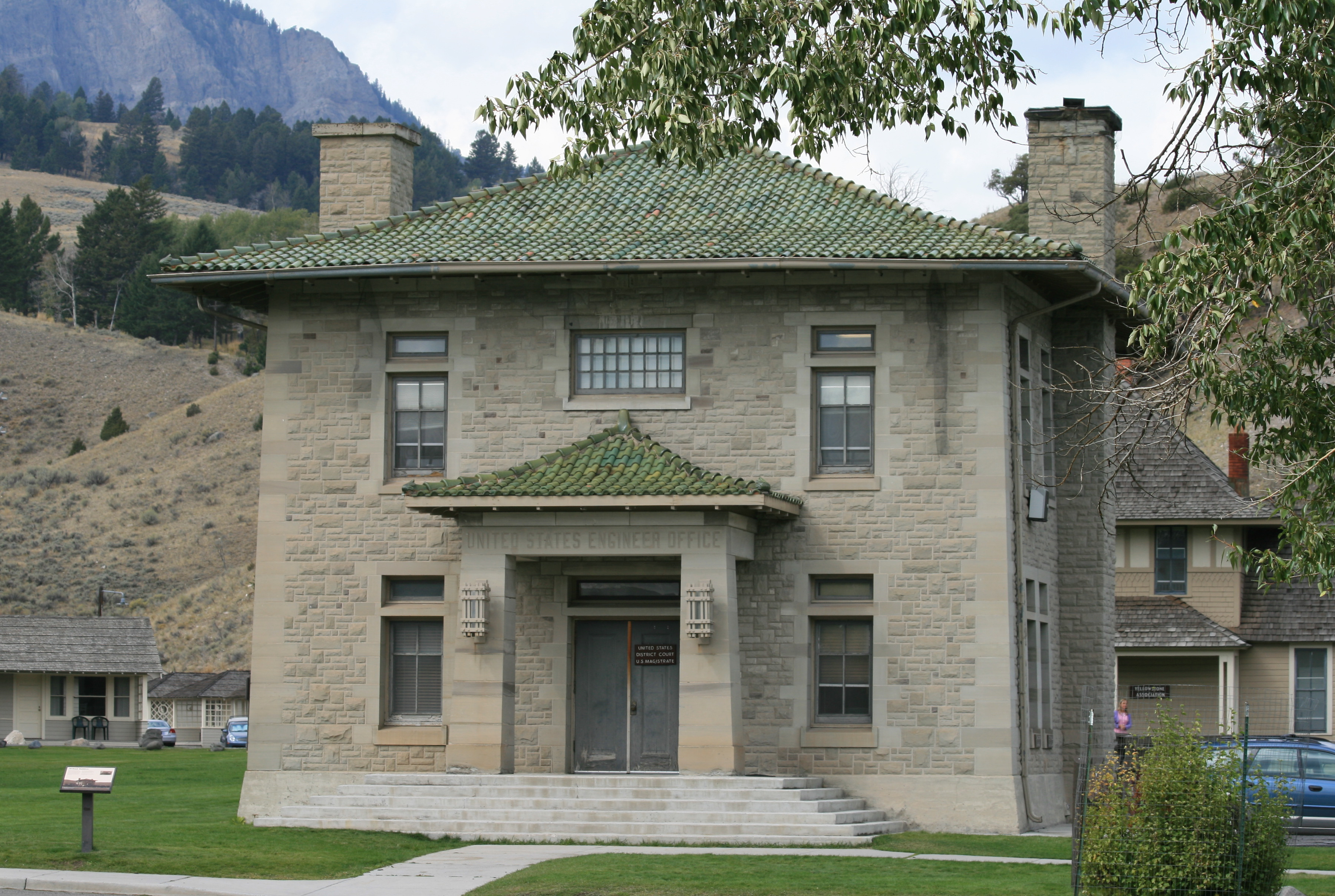
Engineer's office

Captain Hiram M. Chittenden was the U.S. Army Corps of Engineers senior engineer in Yellowstone from 1899 to 1906. The Corps had been responsible for road and other infrastructure construction within the park since 1883. In 1901, in cooperation with Captain John Pitcher, Acting Park Superintendent, he began a series of projects to improve the quality of life at the fort. Chittenden had a reservoir built in 1901 to provide a consistent supply of water for irrigation, human consumption and fire fighting. The engineers oversaw a project during 1901 which cleared, manured and seeded the area immediately in front of officers' row to create a grassy parade ground and seeded areas around the various buildings to reduce perennially dusty summer conditions. Fort Yellowstone transitioned from oil to electric lighting in 1902 after Chittenden completed a 100-kilowatt powerplant 300 yards (270 m) east of the fort. The powerplant and reservoir no longer exist, but most of the grassy areas around Fort Yellowstone that Chittenden planned remain.

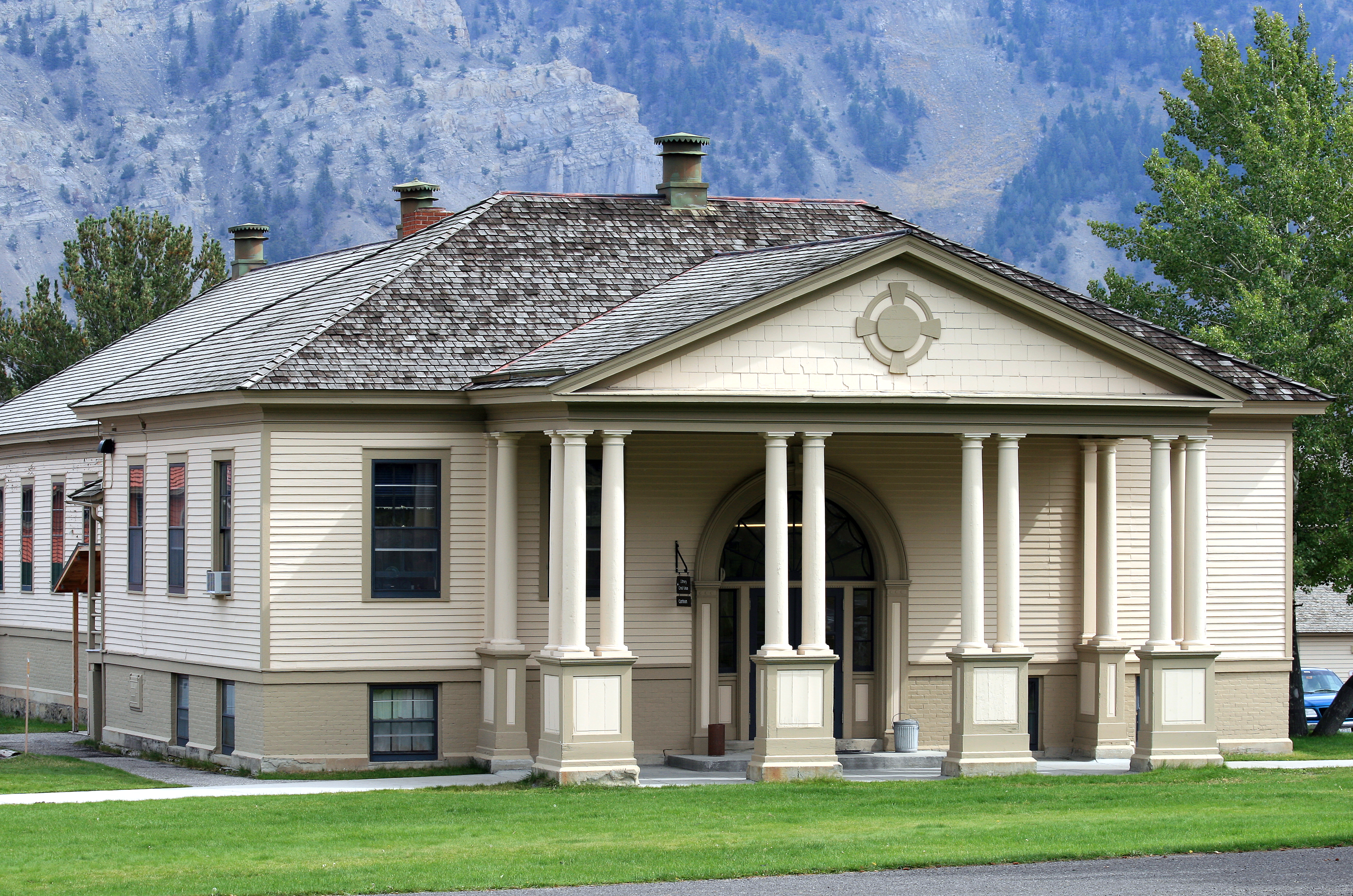
Fort Yellowstone Canteen, originally the Post Exchange

In 1903, Captain Chittenden oversaw the design and construction of the second stone building in Yellowstone, the engineers headquarters (Bldg 39), often called the "Pagoda" because of its design. This structure is in a prominent but isolated location just north of the fort. In 1918, after the National Park Service began administration of the park, the engineer's headquarters building became the first official park headquarters.

Another prominent Yellowstone landmark, the Roosevelt Arch, was constructed in 1903 under the supervision of Chittenden. A north entrance station and gate near Gardiner, Montana, was first suggested by Captains Wilber Wilder and Oscar Brown in 1899. However it was not until 1903 that Chittenden and then-Acting Superintendent Major John Pitcher were able to gain approval for the arch. The ground breaking for the arch coincided with the two-week vacation visit of U.S. President Theodore Roosevelt to the park. Roosevelt was the only U.S. President to visit Yellowstone during the army era. On his last day in the park, April 24, 1903, Roosevelt participated in the cornerstone laying ceremony and the arch was completed later that year. In 1904, Major John Pitcher recommended the construction of several new buildings to accommodate the growing contingent of soldiers. The only structure approved was the new post exchange located just south of the double cavalry barracks. This striking Colonial Revival styled structure was completed in 1905, replacing a much smaller post exchange that had been built in 1894. It now functions as the National Park Service canteen.

=== Later construction period (1908–1913) ===
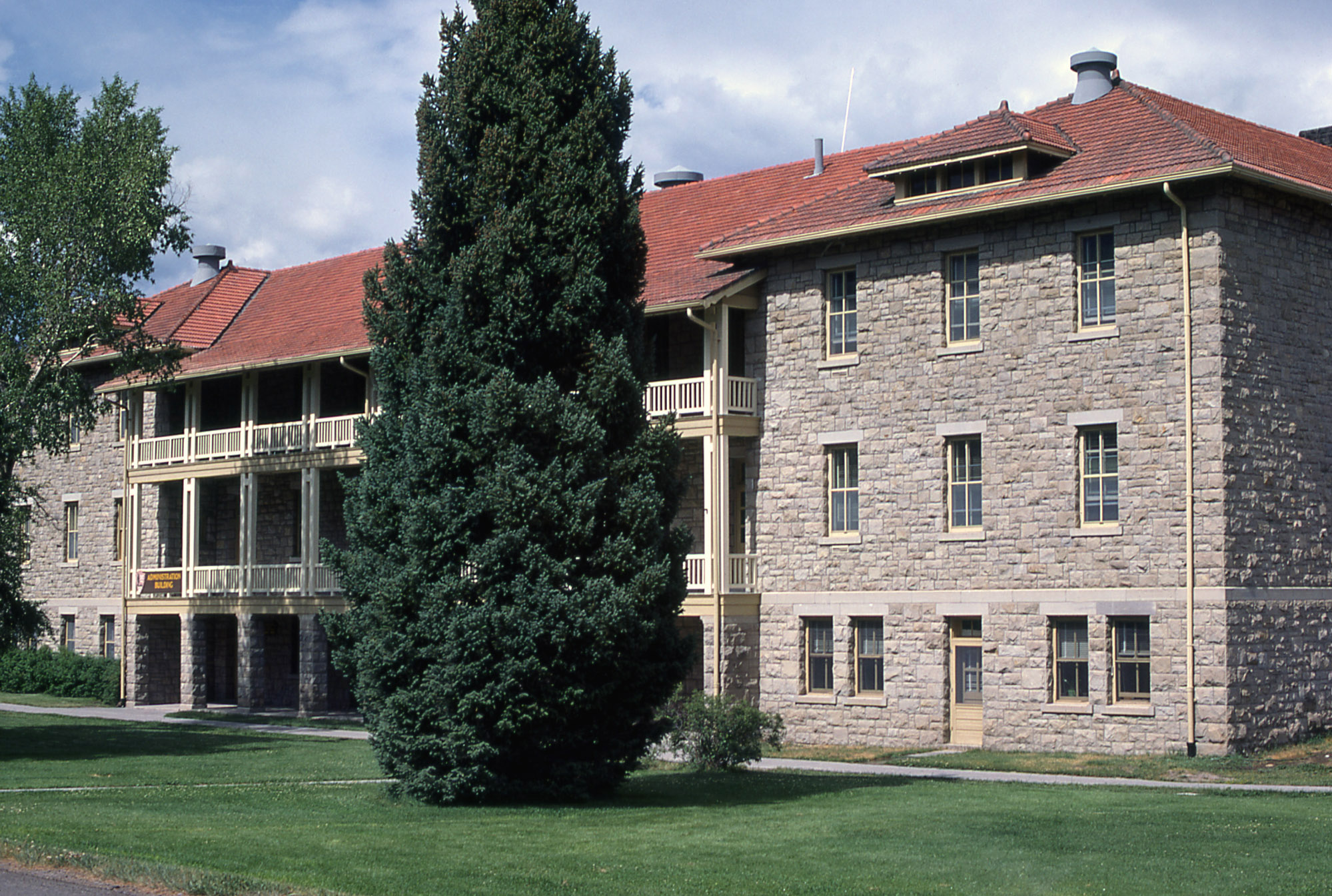
Double cavalry barracks

The second wave of major construction started in 1908 when the largest structures in the fort were built, including the three-story double cavalry barracks (Bldg 36), which now houses the park superintendent's office and is used as the modern park headquarters. Another large building was the bachelor officers' quarters (Bldg 1), constructed immediately to the west, fronting the parade ground. This iconic building anchors the northwest corner of the main fort area and houses the Horace Albright Visitor Center, a museum, theater and the Yellowstone Forever gift shop.

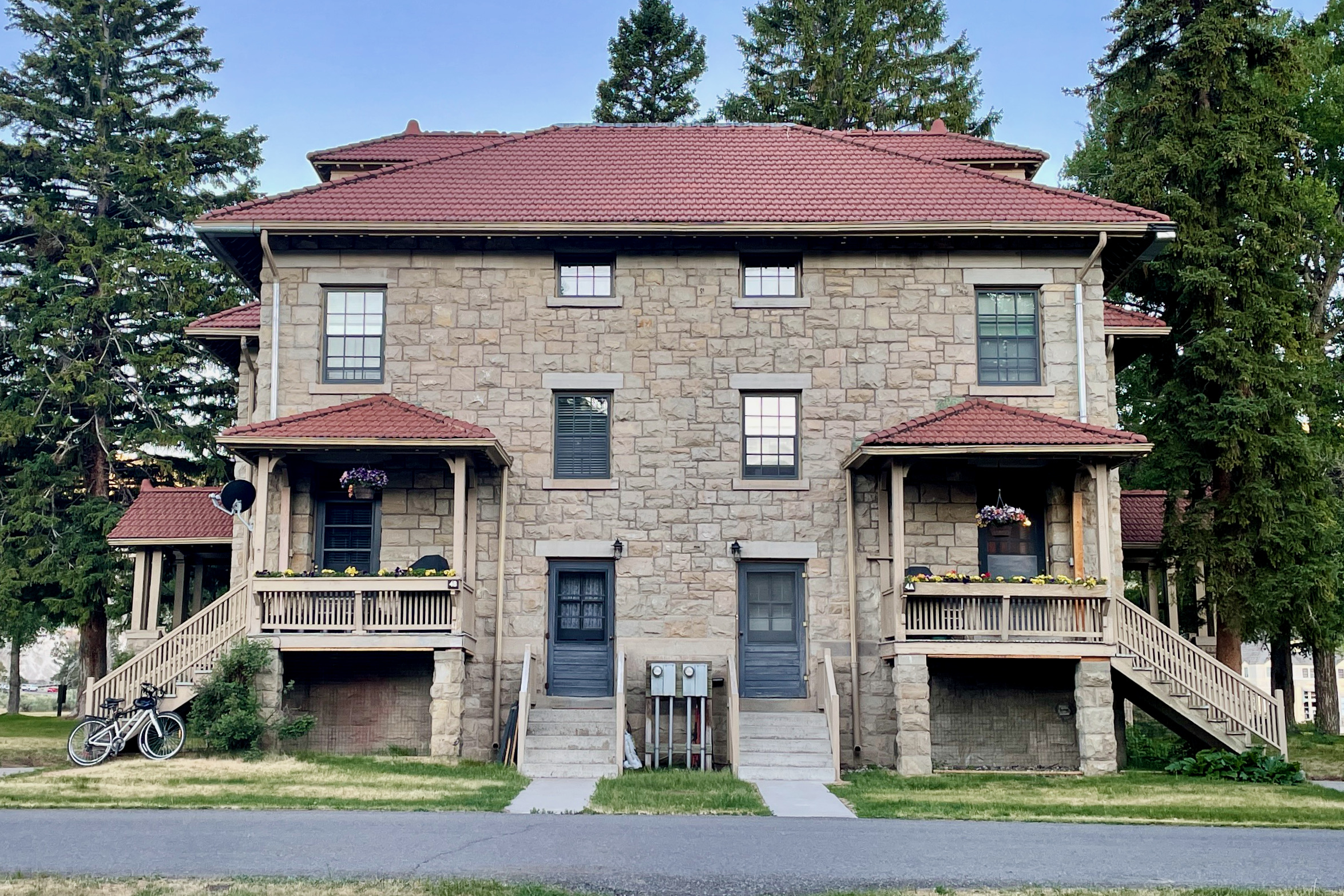
Double captains' quarters

Officers' row was completed with the construction of a double captains' quarters (Bldg 2) and a field officers' quarters (Bldg 3) immediately south of the bachelor officers' quarters. Cavalry stables (Bldgs 34 and 38), a double stable guardhouse and blacksmith shop (Bldg 37) were built behind these residences. All these buildings are used by the National Park Service as administrative offices, maintenance facilities or residences.

The increasing size of the army contingent required a more up-to-date guardhouse than the original. Acting Superintendents Major Benson and Colonel Brett wanted the new guardhouse to be constructed of stone. The War Department could not justify the expense, so in 1911 the guardhouse was built from concrete.

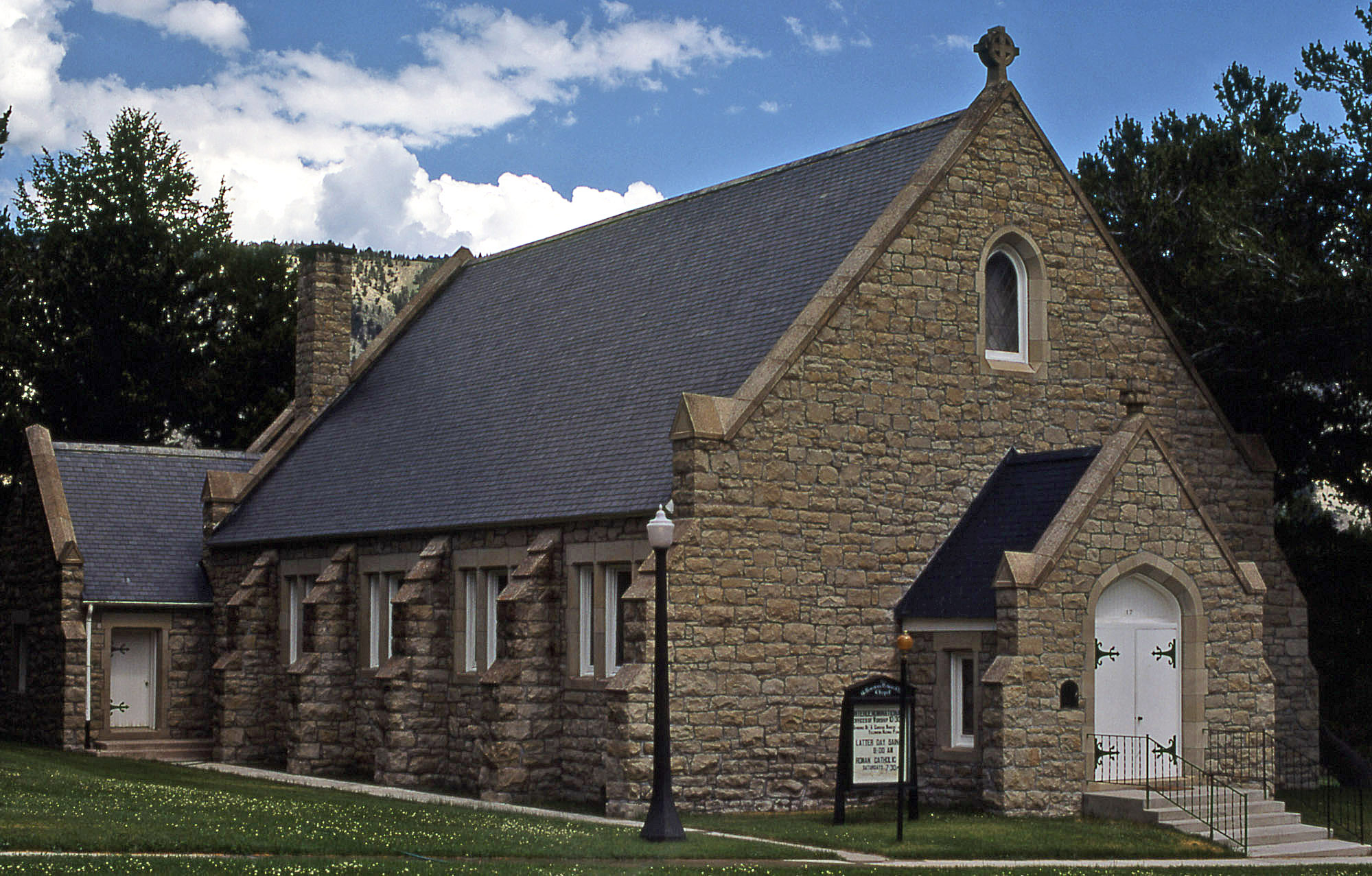
The Chapel, constructed in 1913

The last building constructed at Fort Yellowstone was the chapel, located just south of the original guardhouse. Army policy did not mandate that army forts provide places of worship. However, at the insistence of park superintendent Pitcher, U.S. Commissioner Meldrum and Wyoming state senator Francis E. Warren, Congress appropriated the funds for the construction of a chapel in 1909 and the building was finished in January 1913. On September 19, 1914, Katharine Piercy Edmunds and Captain Albert Ady King, 1st U.S. Cavalry, were the first couple to be married in the new chapel. Reverend Pritchard, an Episcopalian missionary, traveled to the fort from Emigrant, Montana to perform the ceremony.

=== Remote facilities ===
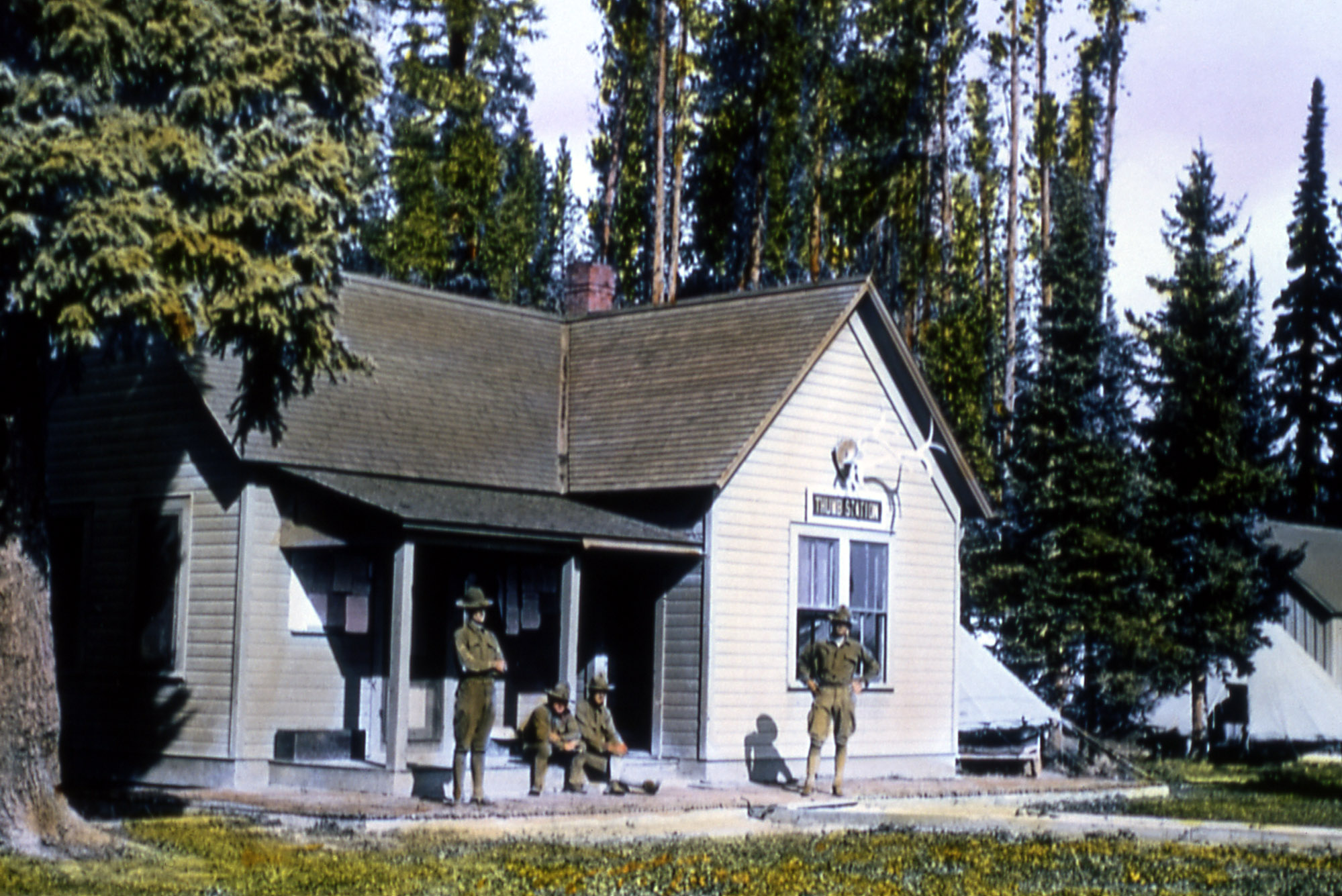
West Thumb Soldier Station in 1904

To provide shelter for small detachments of soldiers on overnight patrols, the army constructed soldier and snowshoe cabins in remote and isolated spots and at popular tourist locations. Most of these structures no longer exist, but similar, more modern cabins are maintained by the National Park Service throughout the park.

The first soldier cabins were built in 1886 as part of Camp Sheridan and all of these were later removed. Cabins were also built at the Lower Geyser Basin, Upper Geyser Basin, Grand Canyon of the Yellowstone, Riverside and at Soda Butte. As more outposts were needed over the years cabins were constructed at Lake Outlet (1887), Snake River (Polecat Creek), West Thumb and Riverside (1892), Mud Geyser (1895), Norris and Thumb Bay (1897), Lake (1899), Snake River (1902), Gardiner (1903), West Thumb, Syvan Pass and Soda Butte (1904), Tower (1907), Crevice Mountain (1912), Snake River (1914), and Aster Creek, Cabin Creek, Harebell, and Thorofare (1915). Snowshoe cabins in existence in 1899 included small structures at Astringent Creek, Bartlet, Boundary Creek, Coulter Creek, Hellroaring Creek, Lewis River, Park Point, Proposition, Trappers Creek, Trout Creek and Willow Creek. While none of the aforementioned structures are still in existence, four remote structures remain. They include the Buffalo Lake snowshoe cabin (Bldg 234) and the Norris and Bechler River soldier stations (Bldgs 111 and 231). The Norris soldier station currently houses the Museum of the National Park Ranger. Additionally, the Bechler River barn (Bldg 232) is still in existence.

== Historical significance of the U.S. Army in Yellowstone ==
U.S. Army management of Yellowstone was so successful that by 1891 they were also managing Sequoia, Yosemite and Kings Canyon National Parks in California and Mackinac National Park in Michigan. The National Park Service later followed the precedents established by the army and incorporated them into their own management strategy. During its tenure at Yellowstone, the army developed regulations that put emphasis on protection of park resources, safety of visitors, and positive but effective visitor interaction. Under the watchful eyes of the army, the geothermal features, forests and wildlife of Yellowstone were protected from vandalism, fire and poaching. These practices were adopted by the National Park Service and continue as a foundation of National Park management policy. Proactive actions by the army in stopping poaching in the park led to the passing of the Lacey Act of 1894, which established legal protection for the wildlife and remedies for dealing with violators.

When Company M, 1st U.S. Cavalry arrived in Yellowstone, Captain Moses Harris, a Civil War Medal of Honor recipient, on his own authority and initiative, promulgated a set of rules that his staff enforced to protect park resources still adhered to in the 21st century:

1) The cutting of green timber, or the removal or displacement of any mineral deposits or natural curiosities, is forbidden. 2) Hunting or trapping and the discharge of firearms within the limited of the Park is prohibited. Fishing is forbidden except with hook and line, and the sale of fish so taken is also disallowed. 3) Wagon tires on all wagons used for freighting purposes on roads ... are required to be a least four inches in width. 4) Camping parties will only build fires when actually necessary. 5) The sale of intoxicating liquors, except by hotel proprietors to their guests, for their own use, is strictly prohibited. 6) Trespassers within the Park for illicit purposes, or persons wantonly violating the foregoing rules, will be summarily removed from the Park. 8) No rocks, sticks, or other obstructions must be thrown into any of the springs or geysers within the park. ... It is enjoined upon all soldiers ... to be vigilant and attentive in the enforcement of the foregoing regulations. ... they will in the enforcement of their orders conduct themselves in a courteous and polite, but firm and decided manner.

— As quoted in How the U.S. Cavalry Saved Our National Parks

Even though Harris and his soldiers vigilantly enforced the rules, arresting many violators, there was no legal authority for prosecution or punishment. All Harris could do was expel violators from the park.

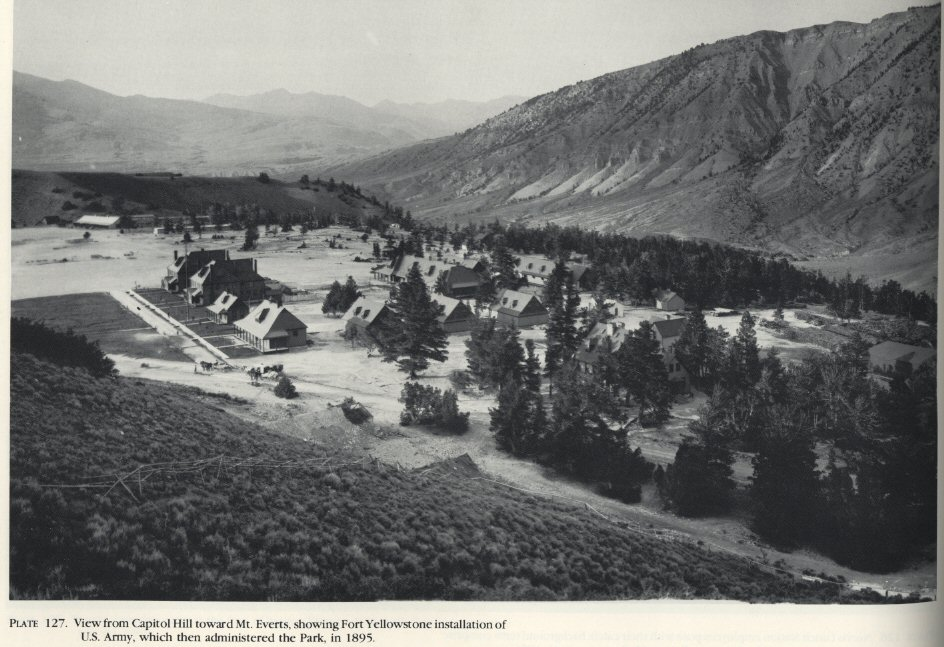
Fort Yellowstone 1895 (F. J. Haynes)

Captain Harris, and his successor, Captain Frazier Augustus Boutelle, established a network of soldier and snowshoe cabins throughout the remote portions of the park. These cabins, strategically located about 10 miles (16 km) apart, were used by detachments of soldiers throughout the year as they stayed watchful for wildfires, vandalism and poaching. The use of remote ranger cabins for patrolling the park is still practiced by Park Rangers. Captain Young, during his first tour as Acting Superintendent in 1897, established patrol cabin policies that are essentially still followed by Park Rangers. Young required that soldiers using a patrol cabin keep a daily log of activities, including game counts, visitor counts and weather observations. These logs were used to compile a monthly report sent to the headquarters at Fort Yellowstone. Young issued the following orders to all soldiers using the snowshoe cabins.

All persons are enjoined to use the rations in the snowshoe cabins only in case of necessity; never under any circumstances to waste any of them and always to leave the cabins and their contents secure and in good condition. The ax and shovel must be left inside, the comforts hanged [sic] up, the cooking utensils left clean and dry and the food in its box secure from mice, etc. Enough dry wood for one night should always be left in the cabin.

— as quoted in Managing the Matchless Wonders-History of Administrative Development in Yellowstone National Park, 1872–1965

=== Wildlife policies ===
Of the many decisions made by Captain Boutelle in managing the park, his approach to fisheries had significant and lasting impact. Boutelle was an avid angler and recognized the angling potential in Yellowstone waters. In 1889 he suggested the U.S. Fish Commission consider stocking many of the fish-less lakes and streams in Yellowstone.

Besides the beautiful Shoshone and other smaller lakes, there are hundreds of miles of as fine streams as any in existence without a fish of any kind. I have written Col. Marshall McDonald, U.S. Fish Commission, upon the subject, and have received letters from him manifesting a great interest. I hope through him to see all of these waters so stocked that the pleasure-seeker in the Park can enjoy fine fishing within a few rods of any hotel or camp.

— Acting Superintendent's Report, 1889, Captain Frazier Augustus Boutelle

This suggestion was acted upon and in 1889 the first non-native fish were stocked into Yellowstone waters, a practice that continued until 1955 and helped create the angling experience Yellowstone National Park is renowned for.

In 1902, the population of bison in the park had declined to approximately 25 individual animals. Under the leadership of Captain Pitcher, the army began a program of importing plains bison from private domestic herds in Texas and Montana. Fenced enclosures were created at Mammoth and in the Lamar Valley. Areas were ploughed and planted with oats and timothy to feed the captive bison herds as well as the expanding elk herds. The bison enclosure in the Lamar Valley became known as the Lamar Buffalo Ranch. When the army left the park in 1918, the bison population was estimated to have increased to 400 individuals.

=== Transition to the National Park Service ===
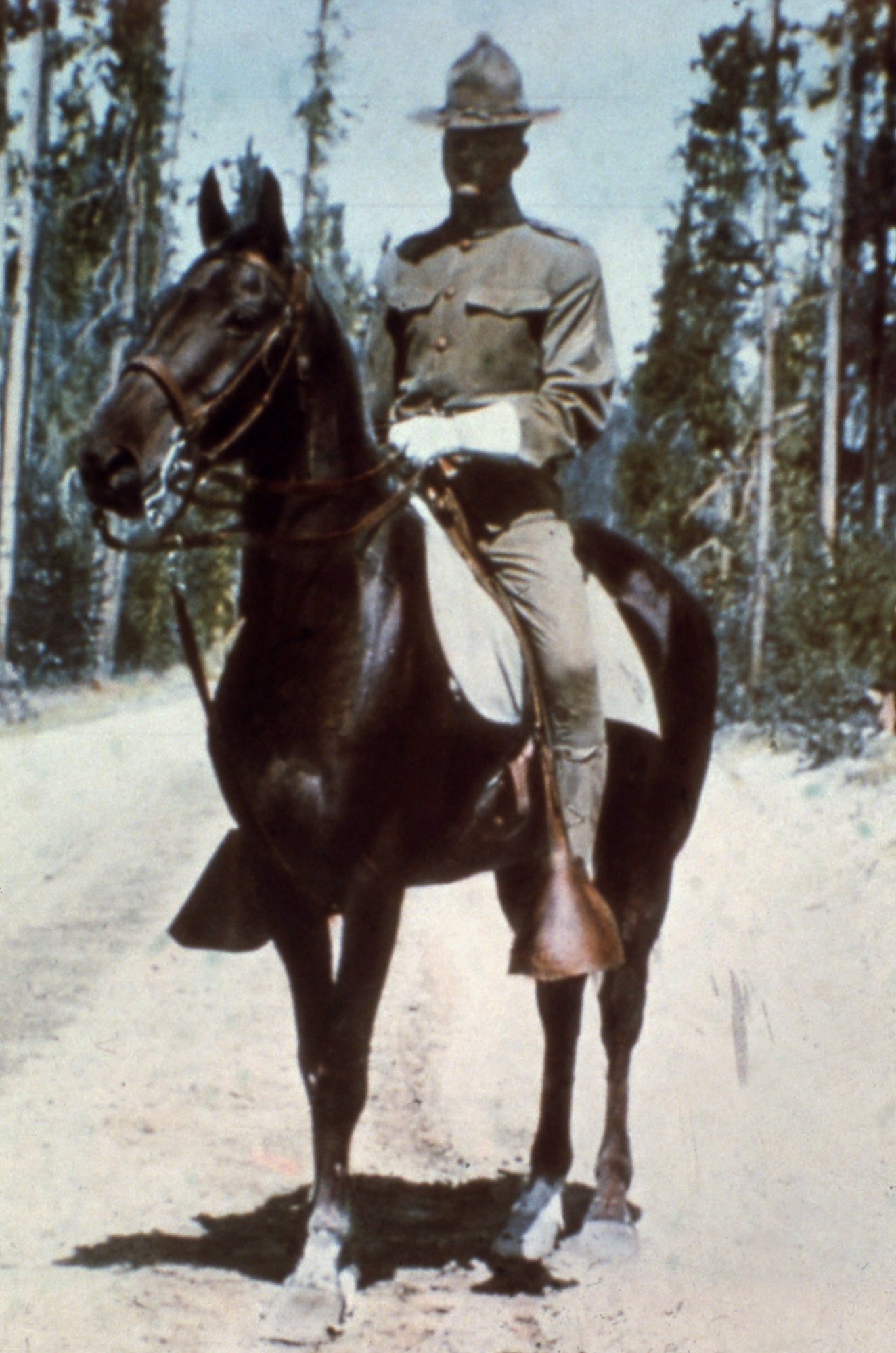
Mounted U.S. Army Cavalryman

After serving more than six years as the Acting Superintendent, Major John Pitcher was replaced by Lieutenant General Samuel B.M. Young (U.S. Army retired) in June 1907. Young was appointed by the Secretary of the Interior, James Rudolph Garfield as full superintendent of the park. Although Young was a senior officer, command of the troops at Fort Yellowstone was given to Major H. T. Allen. Young's lasting contribution to Fort Yellowstone's history was his proposal to replace the army with a force of Civilian Guards. Young, who had served as Acting Superintendent as a Captain in 1897 recognized the dysfunctional and complicated relationships between the War Department, Corps of Engineers and Interior Department which Congress knew was adversely impacting the successful administration of the park. Young's proposal was not acted upon, but it did set the stage for a decade of change that ultimately saw the creation of the National Park Service in 1916 as well as a Park Ranger force to protect the national parks.

Although the cavalry had been successful in protecting the park, by 1914 the average soldier was not cutout for the strenuous, diplomatic and tedious nature of the work, and the high level of training related to cavalry skills. World War I added further impetus to a transition back to civilian management, to relieve the army of a duty that could be performed by civilian rangers. In July 1914, the 1st Cavalry was withdrawn from Yellowstone and replaced with a composite unit of 200 cavalrymen from throughout the army, many of whom had served in Yellowstone previously.

Throughout 1915–16, the Interior Department was organizing itself to deal with the growing number of national parks and ultimately, Congress created the National Park Service on August 25, 1916. Prior to the establishment of the National Park Service, in July 1916 the War Department agreed to withdraw troops from Yellowstone as of October 1, 1916, which was the end of the park visitation season. At the same time, the War Department agreed to discharge a select number of the current volunteer cavalry contingent on September 29, 1916, so they could go to work for the National Park Service as Park Rangers.

Unfortunately, Congress failed to appropriate funds for the new National Park Service for 1917 and the ranger force was disbanded in the spring of 1917. Political pressure from the Montana Congressional delegation over the loss of economic revenue from the army presence resulted in the recall of the army and 450 soldiers from the 7th Cavalry Regiment were sent back to Fort Yellowstone to protect the park. Administrative control remained with the Interior Department under the supervision of Acting Superintendent Chester Allinson Lindsley, a long time civilian employee in the park. Relations between the army, the Corps of Engineers and the Interior Department continued to be contentious in 1917–1918 as disagreements over proposed construction, ownership of buildings and use of personnel persisted. In 1918, Director of the National Park Service Stephen Mather convinced Congress and the War Department that civilian control of the National Parks under the National Park Service was the right solution. On October 31, 1918, the army left Yellowstone for the last time.

=== Legacy ===
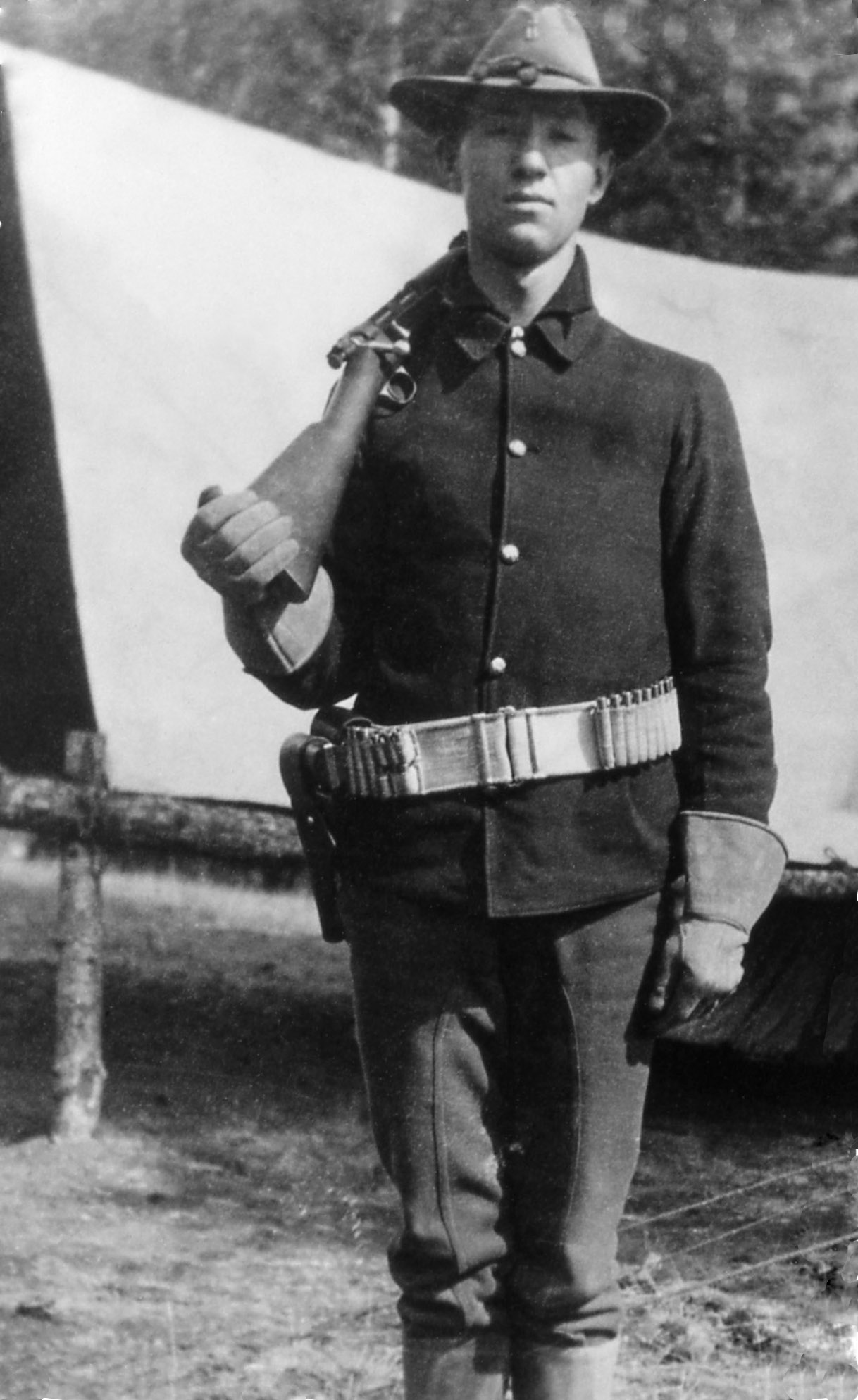
Guard duty 1903

John Muir a foremost American naturalist and often called the "Father of the National Parks" once wrote: "Blessings on Uncle Sam's Soldiers. They have done the job well, and every pine tree is waving its arms for joy."

While Yellowstone was under army management, the activities, policies and procedures developed served as precedents for other national parks and subsequent actions by the National Park Service after its formation in 1916. The army solved a wide variety of problems and developed procedures covering a multitude of administrative issues. The military superintendents continued the evolution of park policies and conservation measures initiated by the first civilian administrators. They implemented backcountry patrols, access improvement, wildlife protection and management, protection of natural features, law enforcement and development of a ranger force. The army set precedents for future headquarters area development designs, visitor services such as educational outreach and interpretive tours. Their diligence in dealing with poachers led to legislation that provided for prosecution and punishment of illegal activity. That most of the precedents that the army established were incorporated later by the National Park Service is a lasting legacy of the important role the army played in U.S. national park history. Modern Park Ranger uniforms are legacies of army management of the park. Most iconically, the campaign hat, a flat-brow peaked hat worn by the cavalry in the last years of army management is nearly identical to the modern hats worn into the 21st century.

== Commanding officers ==
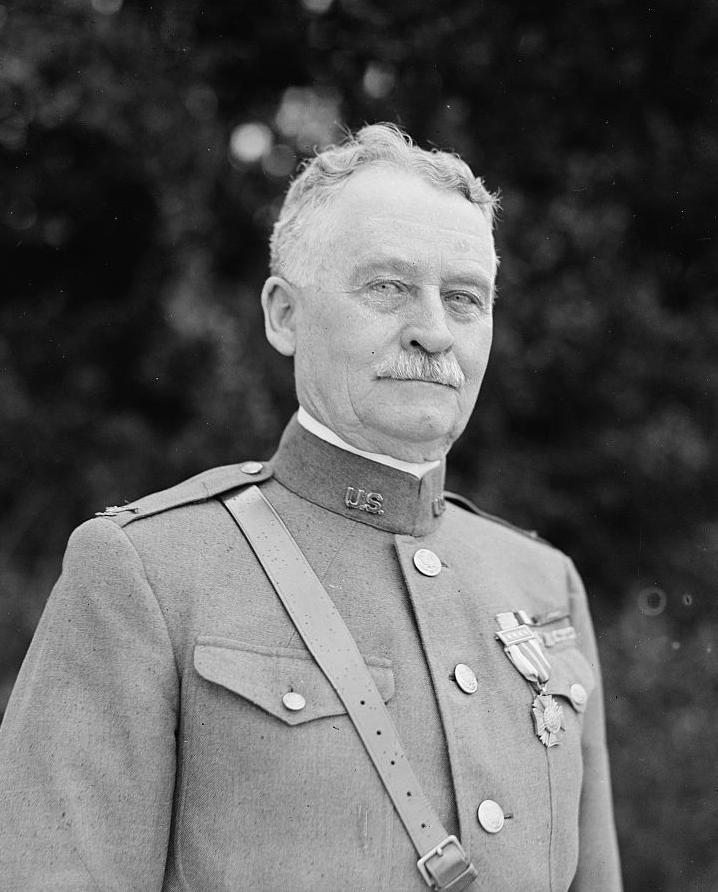
Colonel Lloyd M. Brett was the last army superintendent at Fort Yellowstone

The commanding officer of the Fort Yellowstone troop was designated as the Acting Superintendent of the park, reporting to both the army and the Interior Secretary. The following army officers served in this position at Fort Yellowstone.

- Captain Moses Harris: August 20, 1886 – May 31, 1889
- Captain Frazier Augustus Boutelle: June 1, 1889 – February 15, 1891
- Captain George S. Anderson: February 15, 1891 – June 23, 1897
- Captain Samuel B. M. Young: June 23, 1897 – November 15, 1897
- Captain James B. Erwin: November 15, 1897 – March 15, 1899
- Captain Wilber E. Wilder: March 15, 1899 – June 23, 1899
- Captain Oscar J. Brown: June 23, 1899 – July 24, 1900
- Captain George W. Goode: July 24, 1900 – May 8, 1901
- Captain/Major John Pitcher: May 8, 1901 – June 1, 1907
- Lt. General Samuel B. M. Young (retired): June 1, 1907 – November 28, 1908 (Note: General Young was asked to return to the park and was appointed full superintendent by the Secretary of the Interior.)
  - Major H. T. Allen (Commander of troops)
- Major Harry C. Benson: November 28, 1908 – September 30, 1910
- Colonel Lloyd M. Brett: September 30, 1910 – October 15, 1916

=== Units assigned ===
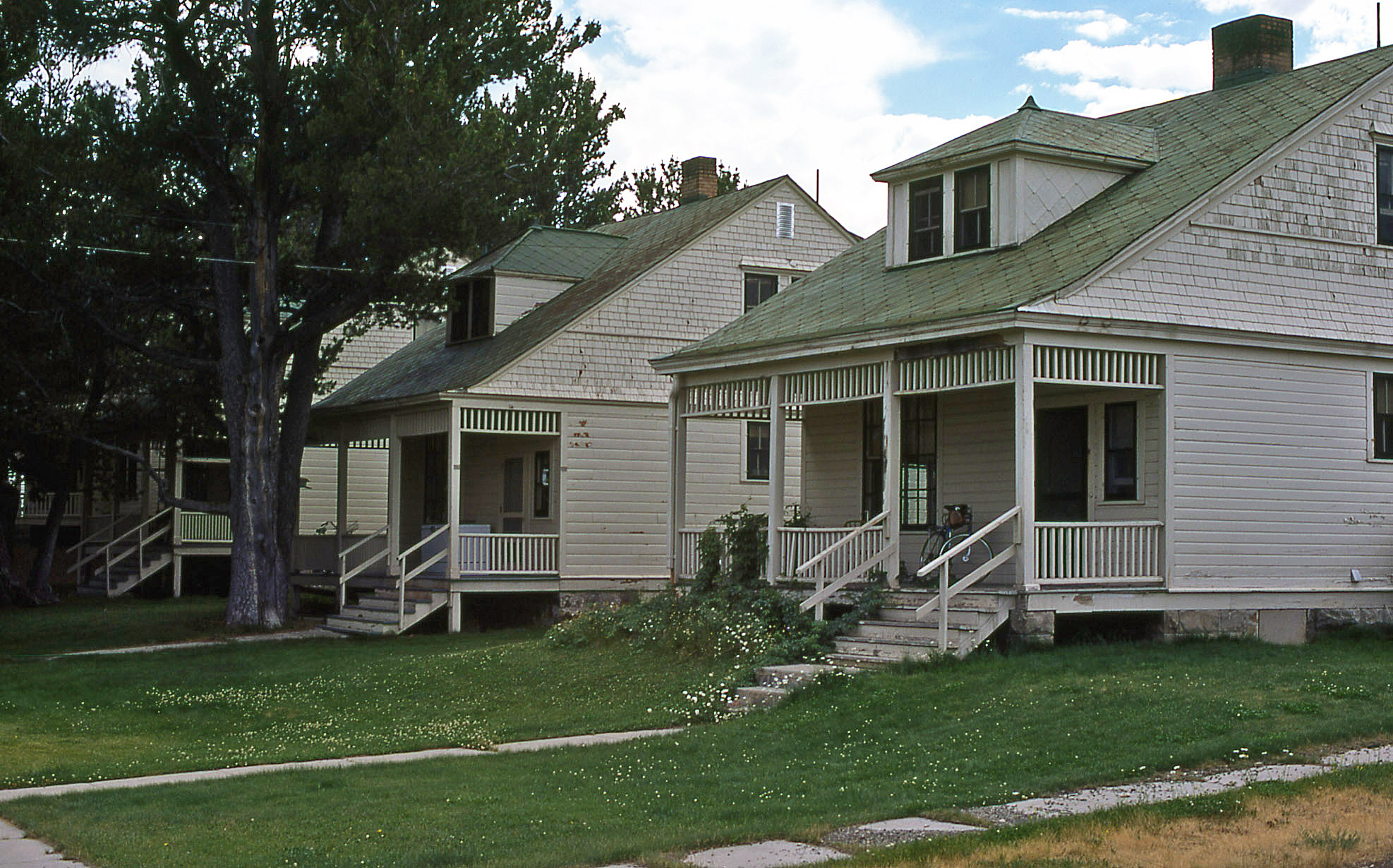
NCO quarters known as "soap-suds row"

Six different cavalry regiments were stationed off and on during army administration of Yellowstone.

- 1st Cavalry Regiment: 1886–1891, 1900–1902, 1911–1914
- 4th Cavalry Regiment: 1898–1899
- 5th Cavalry Regiment: 1909–1910
- 6th Cavalry Regiment: 1892–1897, 1906–1907
- 8th Cavalry Regiment: 1908
- Yellowstone Park Detachment: 1915–1916
- 7th Cavalry Regiment: 1917–1918

== See also ==
- Grand Loop Road Historic District
- Lake Fish Hatchery Historic District
- North Entrance Road Historic District
- Roosevelt Lodge Historic District
- Old Faithful Historic District
- US Post Office-Yellowstone Main
