= Lamar Buffalo Ranch =

- U.S. National Register of Historic Places
- U.S. Historic district
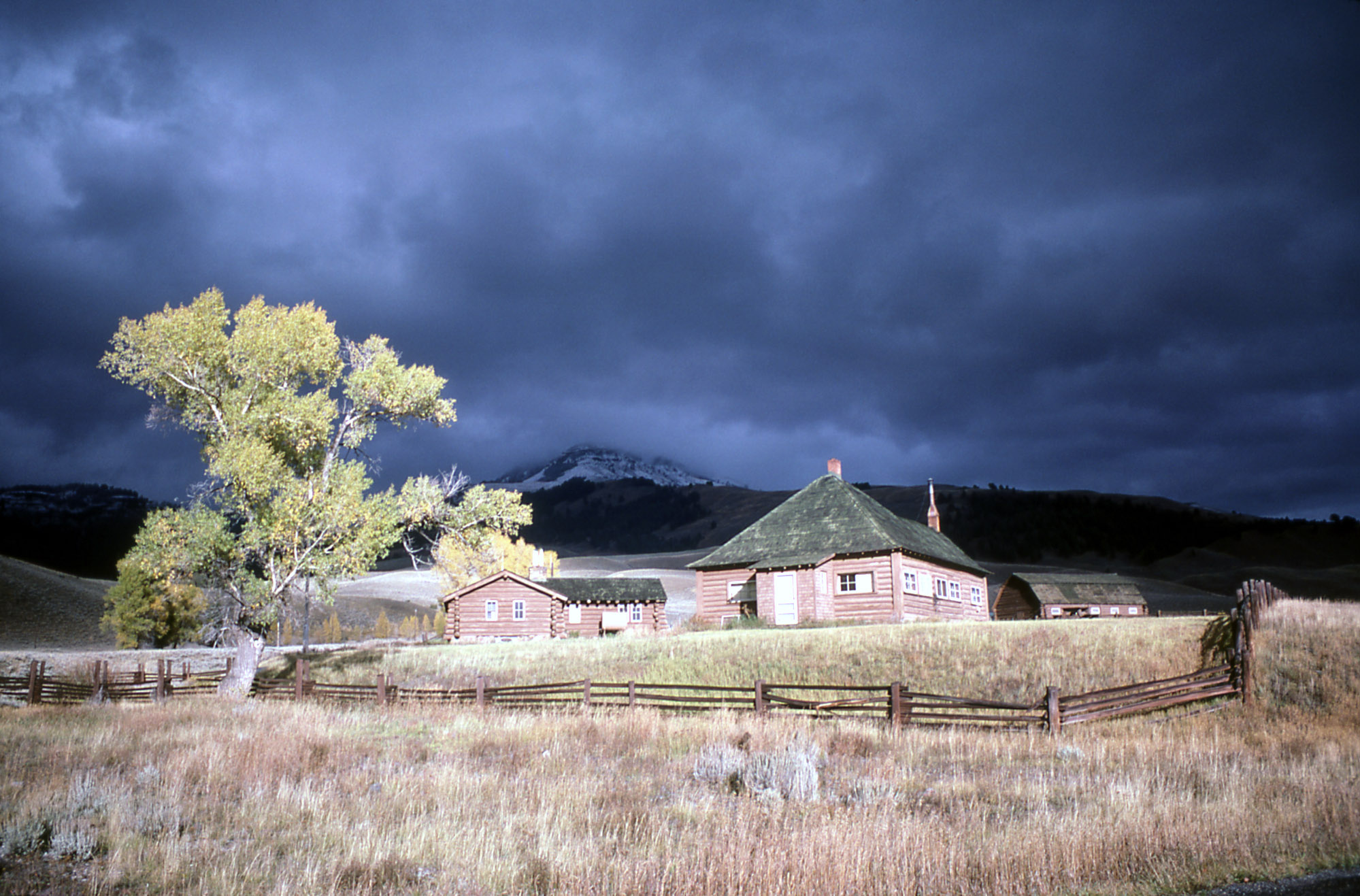

- Location within Wyoming Location within the United States
- Nearest city: Mammoth, Wyoming, United States
- Coordinates: 44°53′44″N 110°14′8″W
- Built: 1915–1930s
- Architect: National Park Service
- MPS: Yellowstone National Park MPS
- NRHP reference No.: 82001835
- Added to NRHP: December 7, 1982

The Lamar Buffalo Ranch is a historic livestock ranch in the Lamar River valley of Yellowstone National Park, in the U.S. state of Wyoming. As an early contribution to the conservation of bison, it was created to preserve one of the last free-roaming American bison (buffalo) herds in the United States. The ranch was established in 1907 when 28 bison were moved from Fort Yellowstone to the Lamar Valley in the northeast corner of the park.

The herd at the Lamar Buffalo Ranch was maintained as a semi-domesticated source of additional bison to enhance the park's natural herd. As the ranched herd increased in size, it was released to the open range, where it interbred with the wild herd. After the ranched bison were successfully integrated, the ranch continued to be used to produce hay to feed wild bison in the winter until the 1950s. Because the winter feeding program maintained the herd at artificially high levels and distorted the distribution of bison in the park, it fell from favor as the National Park Service adopted wildlife management policies that attempted to interfere as little as possible with each species' natural ecology.

Today the Lamar Buffalo Ranch is maintained as a historic district comprising five buildings built in the early 20th century. The complex includes a ranger station built in 1915, a bunkhouse built in 1929, a residence which was moved from Soda Butte in 1938, a barn built in 1927, and a corral. The interior of the bunkhouse has since been remodeled and is currently used by the park's public stewardship institute, Yellowstone Forever (formerly the Yellowstone Association), which conducts classes and seminars there.

== Climate ==
Climate data for Lamar Ranger Station, Wyoming, 1991–2020 normals, 1881–2020 extremes: 6575ft (2004m)
Month	Jan	Feb	Mar	Apr	May	Jun	Jul	Aug	Sep	Oct	Nov	Dec	Year
Record high °F (°C)	50 (10)	54 (12)	64 (18)	76 (24)	87 (31)	98 (37)	95 (35)	93 (34)	91 (33)	83 (28)	66 (19)	55 (13)	98 (37)
Mean maximum °F (°C)	40.9 (4.9)	43.1 (6.2)	53.9 (12.2)	65.9 (18.8)	76.1 (24.5)	84.5 (29.2)	89.3 (31.8)	89.6 (32.0)	85.7 (29.8)	70.7 (21.5)	54.6 (12.6)	42.3 (5.7)	75.8 (24.3)
Mean daily maximum °F (°C)	26.5 (−3.1)	31.2 (−0.4)	40.5 (4.7)	49.9 (9.9)	60.3 (15.7)	69.3 (20.7)	81.6 (27.6)	80.2 (26.8)	70.9 (21.6)	53.9 (12.2)	37.5 (3.1)	27.0 (−2.8)	52.4 (11.3)
Daily mean °F (°C)	13.9 (−10.1)	18.0 (−7.8)	26.7 (−2.9)	37.0 (2.8)	46.2 (7.9)	53.2 (11.8)	61.6 (16.4)	59.6 (15.3)	52.1 (11.2)	39.7 (4.3)	25.3 (−3.7)	15.0 (−9.4)	37.4 (3.0)
Mean daily minimum °F (°C)	1.2 (−17.1)	4.7 (−15.2)	12.9 (−10.6)	24.0 (−4.4)	32.0 (0.0)	37.1 (2.8)	41.5 (5.3)	39.0 (3.9)	33.3 (0.7)	25.5 (−3.6)	13.0 (−10.6)	2.9 (−16.2)	22.3 (−5.4)
Mean minimum °F (°C)	−28.4 (−33.6)	−28.8 (−33.8)	−8.4 (−22.4)	3.9 (−15.6)	19.4 (−7.0)	27.3 (−2.6)	32.0 (0.0)	30.0 (−1.1)	22.2 (−5.4)	6.2 (−14.3)	−9.3 (−22.9)	−27.9 (−33.3)	−33.9 (−36.6)
Record low °F (°C)	−55 (−48)	−49 (−45)	−41 (−41)	−18 (−28)	8 (−13)	16 (−9)	21 (−6)	11 (−12)	0 (−18)	−19 (−28)	−35 (−37)	−51 (−46)	−55 (−48)
Average precipitation inches (mm)	1.10 (28)	1.09 (28)	1.10 (28)	1.42 (36)	2.22 (56)	2.46 (62)	1.48 (38)	1.31 (33)	1.47 (37)	1.61 (41)	1.49 (38)	1.21 (31)	17.96 (456)
Average snowfall inches (cm)	22.6 (57)	23.8 (60)	14.0 (36)	3.6 (9.1)	0.9 (2.3)	0.1 (0.25)	0.0 (0.0)	0.0 (0.0)	0.4 (1.0)	2.0 (5.1)	15.3 (39)	21.3 (54)	104 (263.75)
Source 1: NOAA
Source 2: XMACIS2 (2013-2020 snowfall, records & monthly max/mins)

== Gallery ==
Lamar Buffalo Ranch buildings
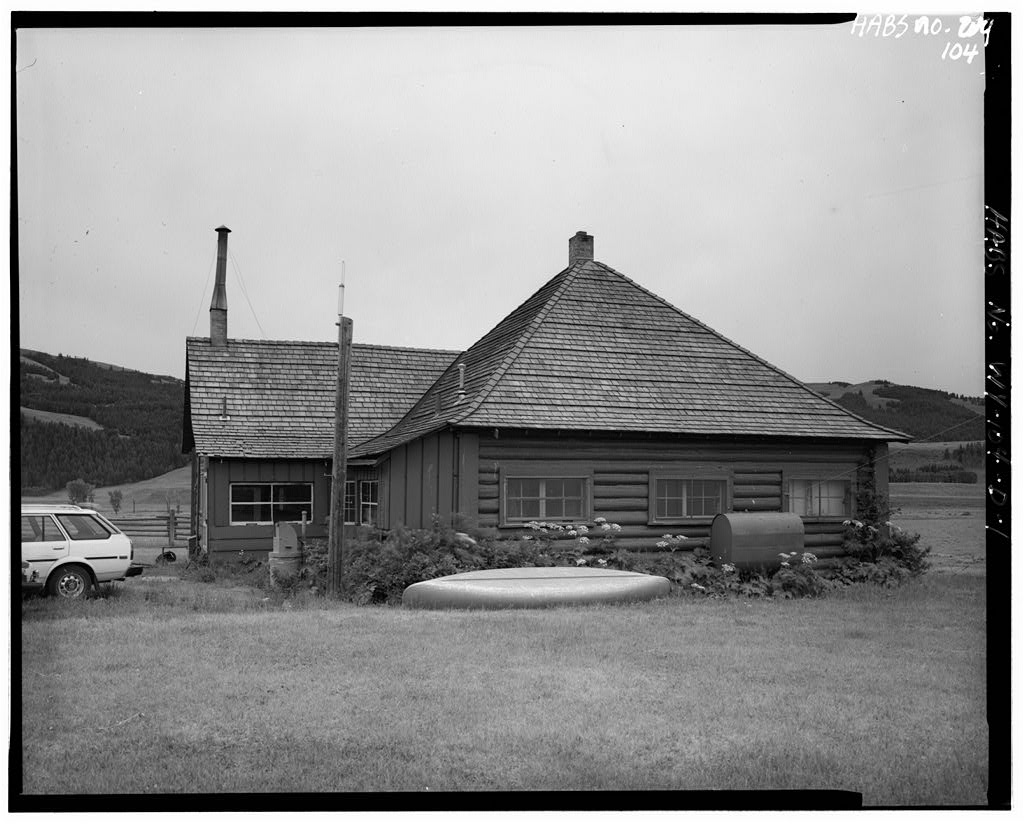

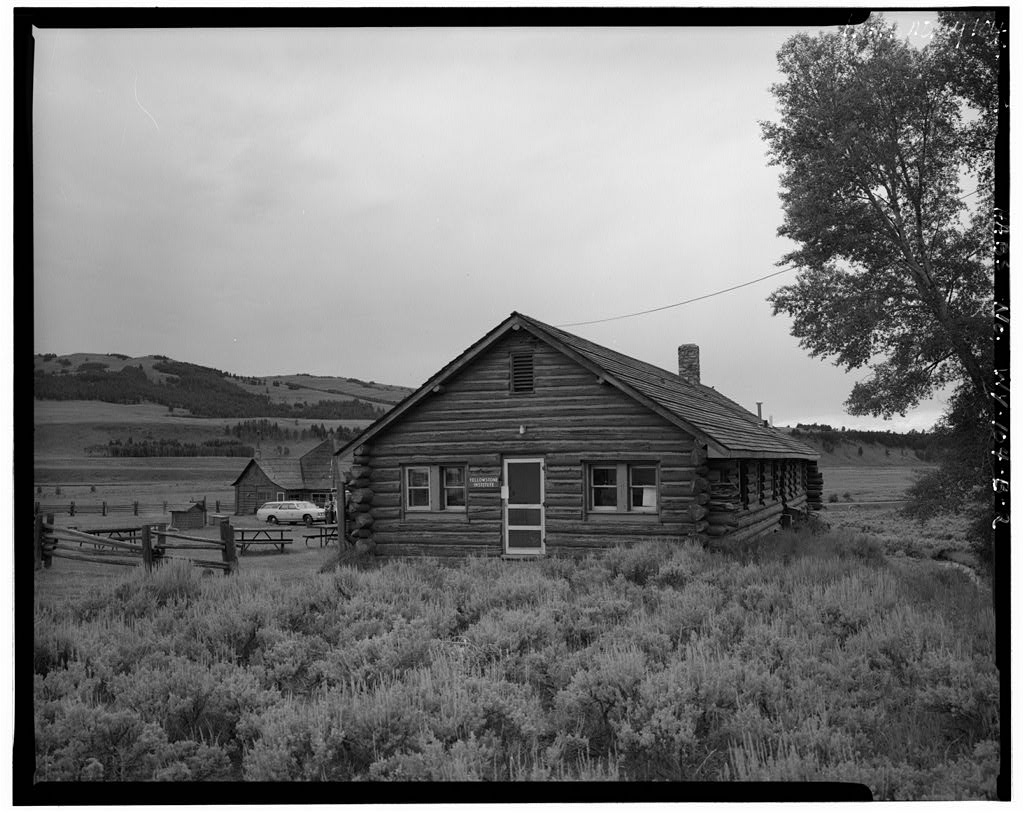

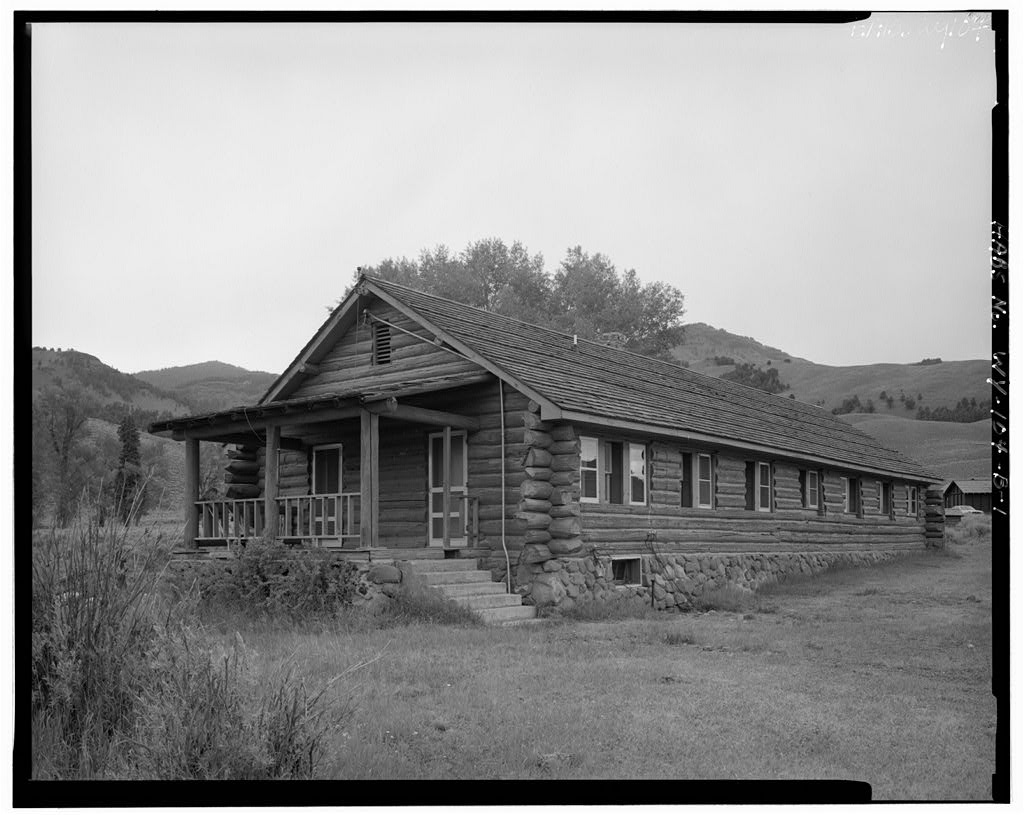

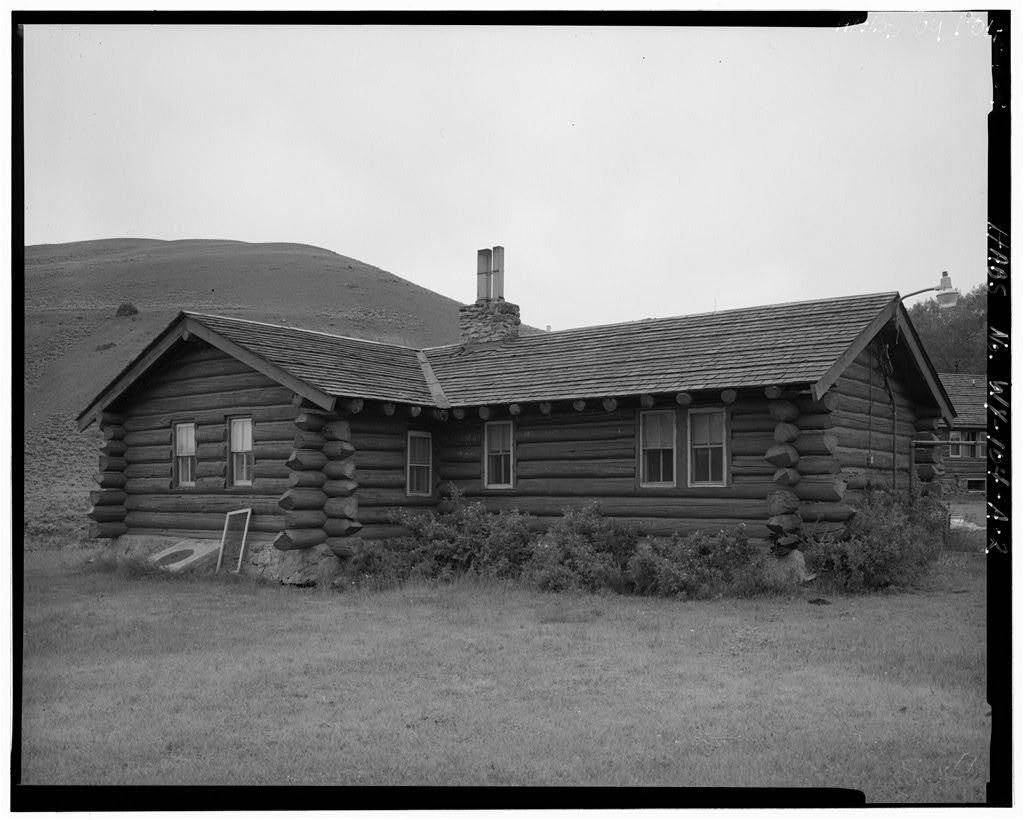

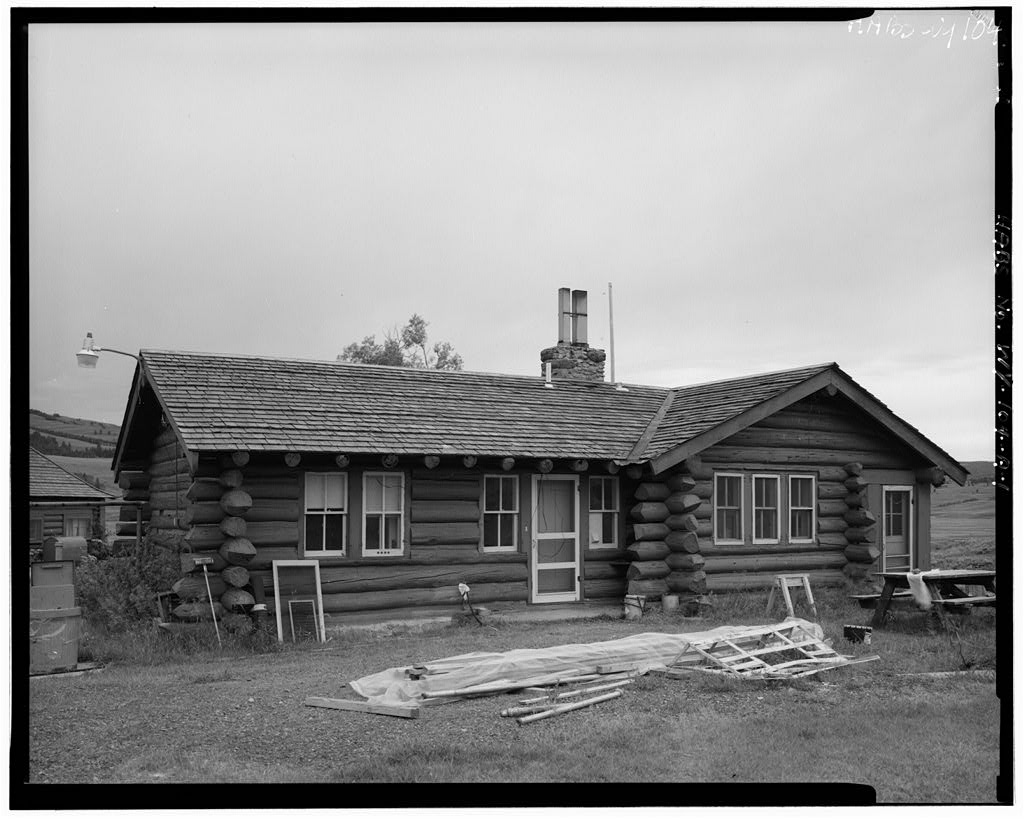

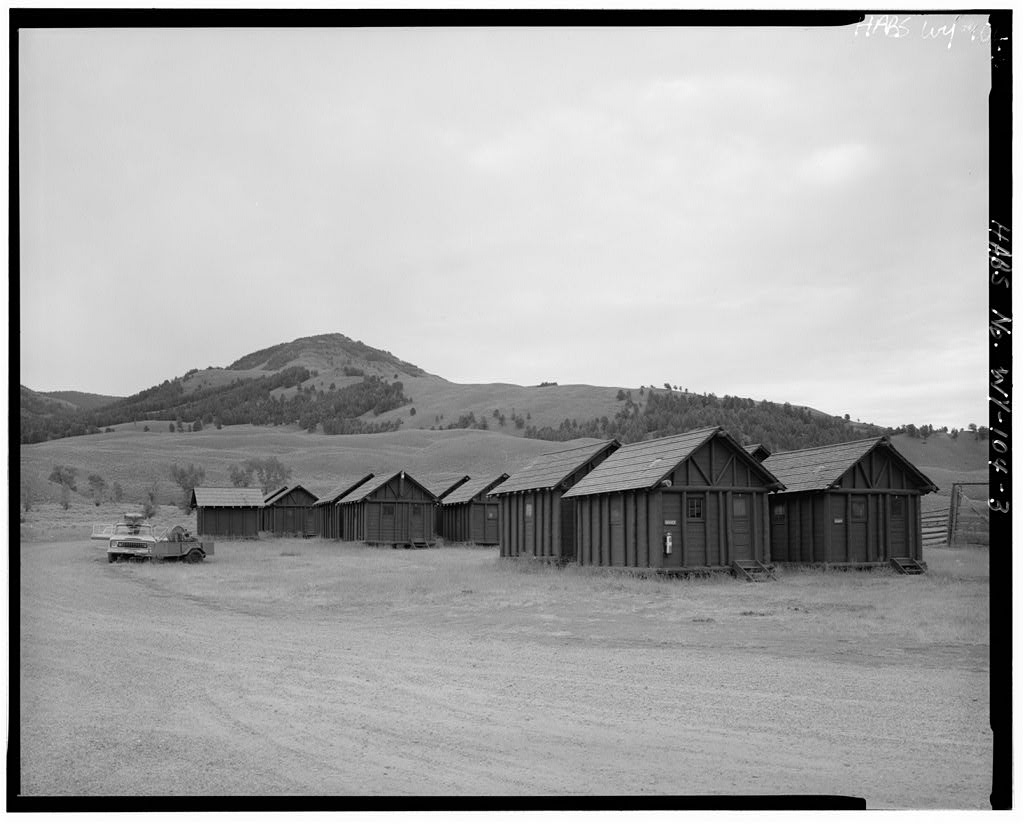
