= Boutell-Hathorn House =

Historic house in Massachusetts, United States

- U.S. National Register of Historic Places
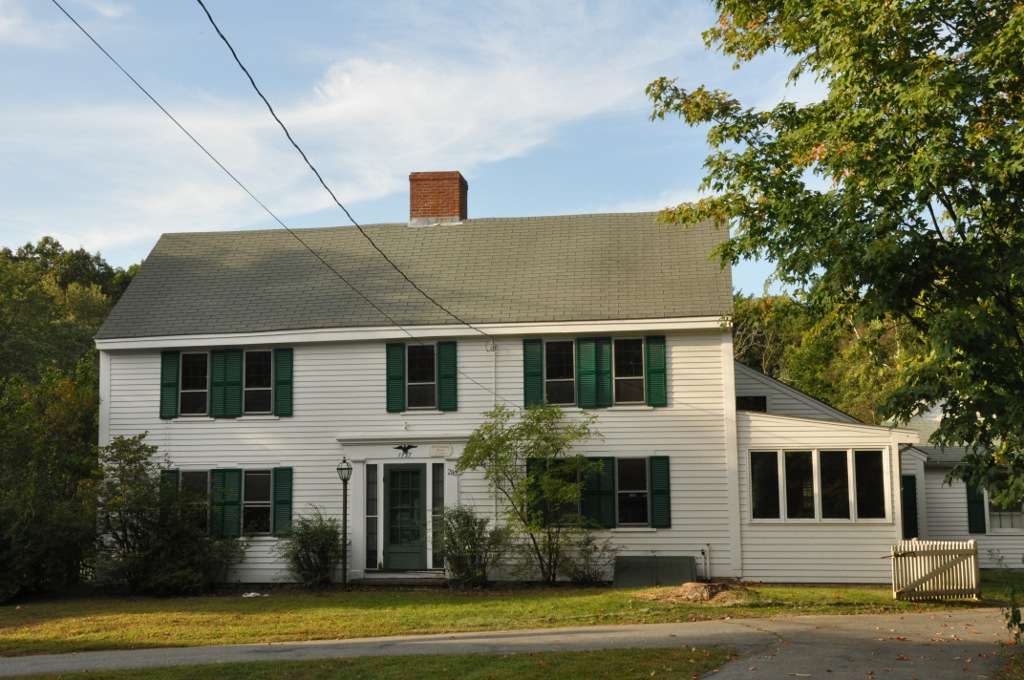

- Location within Massachusetts
- Location: 280 Woburn Street, Wilmington, Massachusetts
- Coordinates: 42°33′54″N 71°8′47″W
- Area: 5.6 acres (2.3 ha)
- Built: 1754
- Architectural style: Georgian, Colonial
- NRHP reference No.: 04001210
- Added to NRHP: October 27, 2004

The Boutell-Hathorn House is a historic house and farm located at 280 Woburn Street in Wilmington, Massachusetts.

== Description and history ==
The 5.6-acre (2.3 ha) property includes a house whose oldest portion predates 1754, a mid-19th century Italianate barn, and rare surviving remnants of a slaughterhouse that was operated by N. B. Eames in the second half of the 19th century. The house is a typical Georgian 2 1/2-story timber-frame house, with five bays and a large central chimney. The barn complex includes as its main section a c. 1845-85 two-story structure with Italianate details (including a period cupola), and a lower single-story structure that housed the slaughtering operation. The house is named for its first two owners.

The house was listed on the National Register of Historic Places on October 27, 2004.

== See also ==
- National Register of Historic Places listings in Middlesex County, Massachusetts
