= Frazier Boutelle =

Brigadier General Frazier Augustus Boutelle
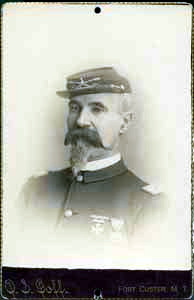
- Frazier Boutelle, 1870
- Born: Troy, New York
- Died: February 12, 1924 (aged 83); Seattle, Washington
- Military career
- Branch: U.S. Army
- Service years: 1861-64, 1865-1895, 1896-97
- Rank: Brigadier General

Frazier Augustus Boutelle (September 12, 1840 – February 12, 1924) served in the US Army for 57 years, fighting in the Civil War and the Indian Wars and working as a recruiter in World War I. In 1889-1890 he was Superintendent of Yellowstone National Park.

== Early life ==
Boutelle was born in Troy, New York. His father, James Augustus Boutelle (1808–1889), was from Massachusetts and descended from Revolutionary War fighter Ebenezer Boutwell. (The family name has variant spellings.) Little is known about his mother, Emeline Lamb Boutelle, but by 1871 she was married to E.F. Gordon and living with a daughter in Ontario. James Boutelle relocated to northern California in the 1850s, and lived with his sister, Susan Boutell Messenger Sterling, in Arcata.

In 1873 Frazier married "Dollie", Mary Adolphine Augusto Hayden, at Vancouver, Washington. Dollie was the daughter of Mary Jane and Gay S.B. Hayden, pioneers who left Wisconsin in 1850 for Vancouver. One of Dollie's sisters, Adelle Spaulding, lived in Fairbanks, Alaska, and the two held shares in an Alaskan mine in the 1920s. Frazier and Dollie had one child, Henry Moss Boutelle, born June 17, 1875, at Vancouver. "Harry" attended Stanford University for a year and then received a commission as a second lieutenant in the 3rd Artillery Regiment in the Philippines. He was killed in action leading the Macabebe Scouts at Aliago on November 2, 1899, during the Philippine–American War. In memory of Harry Boutelle, his name was applied to a place in Macabebe Province, a Boston Harbor steamer of the Quartermaster's Department, and a still-extant battery near the Presidio of San Francisco.

== U.S. Army ==
Frazier Boutelle's military career began June 4, 1861, when he enlisted as one of the first volunteers of the 5th New York Cavalry, Company A. Entering as a quartermaster sergeant, he was commissioned as a second lieutenant November 4, 1862. Following an injury, and promoted to first lieutenant April 2, 1864. During the latter half of 1863, following an injury he was assigned as an ambulance officer to 3rd Cavalry. He was mustered out on disability August 31, 1864, but returned to duty as a captain in the 5th New York on January 10, 1865. Boutelle served at Antietam, Spotsylvania, Cold Harbor, Wilderness, Gettysburg, and the Second Battle of Bull Run. He served on the staff of General James H. Wilson, under General Philip Sheridan, and was mustered out on July 19, 1865.

On February 12, 1866, he reenlisted as a private in the regular Army, and was sent, via Panama, to the West to join the First Cavalry's Company F. By November 1866 Boutelle was at Fort Boise, Idaho, at the beginning of Crook's Winter Campaign. By 1867 he was a sergeant major. He was commissioned as brevet second lieutenant January 2, 1869, and confirmed May 8, and rose to first lieutenant July 31, 1873. Boutelle served in the Indian Wars against the Apache, Piute, Snake, Modoc, and Nez Perce. Most of 1872 was spent in the Klamath region where he was active in the Modoc War and, in a scuffle with Scarface Charley, precipitated a Battle of Lost River that subsequently gained him a brevet promotion and a citation for distinguished service. He was also given a medal during the Nez Perce conflict. Boutelle was promoted to captain on April 24, 1886, and retired August 27, 1895.

=== Fort Yellowstone ===
In June 1889, Captain Frazier Boutelle was appointed as the second acting superintendent of Yellowstone National Park and given command of the U.S. Army contingent (Company M, 1st Cavalry Regiment) in the park. Established as a park in 1872, Yellowstone was initially administered by civilian superintendents appointed by the Secretary of Interior. The Department of Interior was unable to establish sufficient control of the park to protect wildlife, geothermal other park resources. In 1886, the War Department was given authority over the park and the U.S. Army began administering the park in August 1886. The Army established Camp Sheridan (Fort Yellowstone) at Mammoth Hot Springs as park headquarters and developed systems for conservation and resource management between 1886 and 1916 that served as foundations for the National Park Service, created in 1916. Boutelle supported the conservation of bison, advocated stocking streams to maintain fish populations, insisted that travelers use established campgrounds, and developed a system for rapid and effective response to fires, which at that point were primarily caused by park visitors. Of the many decisions made by Captain Boutelle in managing the park, his approach to fisheries had significant and lasting impact. Boutelle was an avid angler and recognized the angling potential in Yellowstone waters. In 1889 he suggested the U.S. Fish Commission consider stocking many of the fish-less lakes and streams in Yellowstone.

Besides the beautiful Shoshone and other smaller lakes, there are hundreds of miles of as fine streams as any in existence without a fish of any kind. I have written Col. Marshall McDonald, U.S. Fish Commission, upon the subject, and have received letters from him manifesting a great interest. I hope through him to see all of these waters so stocked that the pleasure-seeker in the Park can enjoy fine fishing within a few rods of any hotel or camp.

— Acting Superintendent's Report, 1889, Captain Frazier Augustus Boutelle

This suggestion was acted upon and in 1889 the first non-native fish were stocked into Yellowstone waters, a practice that continued until 1955 and helped create the angling experience Yellowstone National Park is renowned for.

He gained recognition in conservation circles for his advocacy of protection for wildlife, landscape, and natural features. 1889 was a particularly bad year for fires in the region, and Boutelle's demands for more resources for firefighting, supported by conservationist George Bird Grinnell, caused Secretary of the Interior John Willock Noble to dismiss him from the superintendent's post on February 14, 1891. He returned to service with the 1st Cavalry's Company K.

=== Washington National Guard ===
Boutelle retired from the Army a second time on August 27, 1895, but immediately took up work with the Washington National Guard. In 1896 Gov. John H. McGraw appointed Boutelle to head the Guard as Adjutant-General, with the rank of brigadier general. Boutelle developed a streamlined reporting system, among other efficiencies, and coped with a Sand Island incursion of armed Oregon fishermen. (Six cyanotypes related to the Sand Island incident are tipped into Boutelle's copy of the Sixth Biennial Report of the Adjutant-General of the State of Washington for the years 1895 and 1896.) Adjutant-General had previously been an elected post, and political turmoil ended Boutelle's term in January 1897.

Frazier Boutelle returned to duty in 1905 as a recruiting officer. He was active at the Seattle office during World War I, the oldest serving officer of his time, and when the office closed in 1919, he retired from military service for the third and final time. Frazier Boutelle died at his home in Seattle on February 12, 1924.
