= Yellowstone National Park =

National park in the western United States

- IUCN category II (national park)
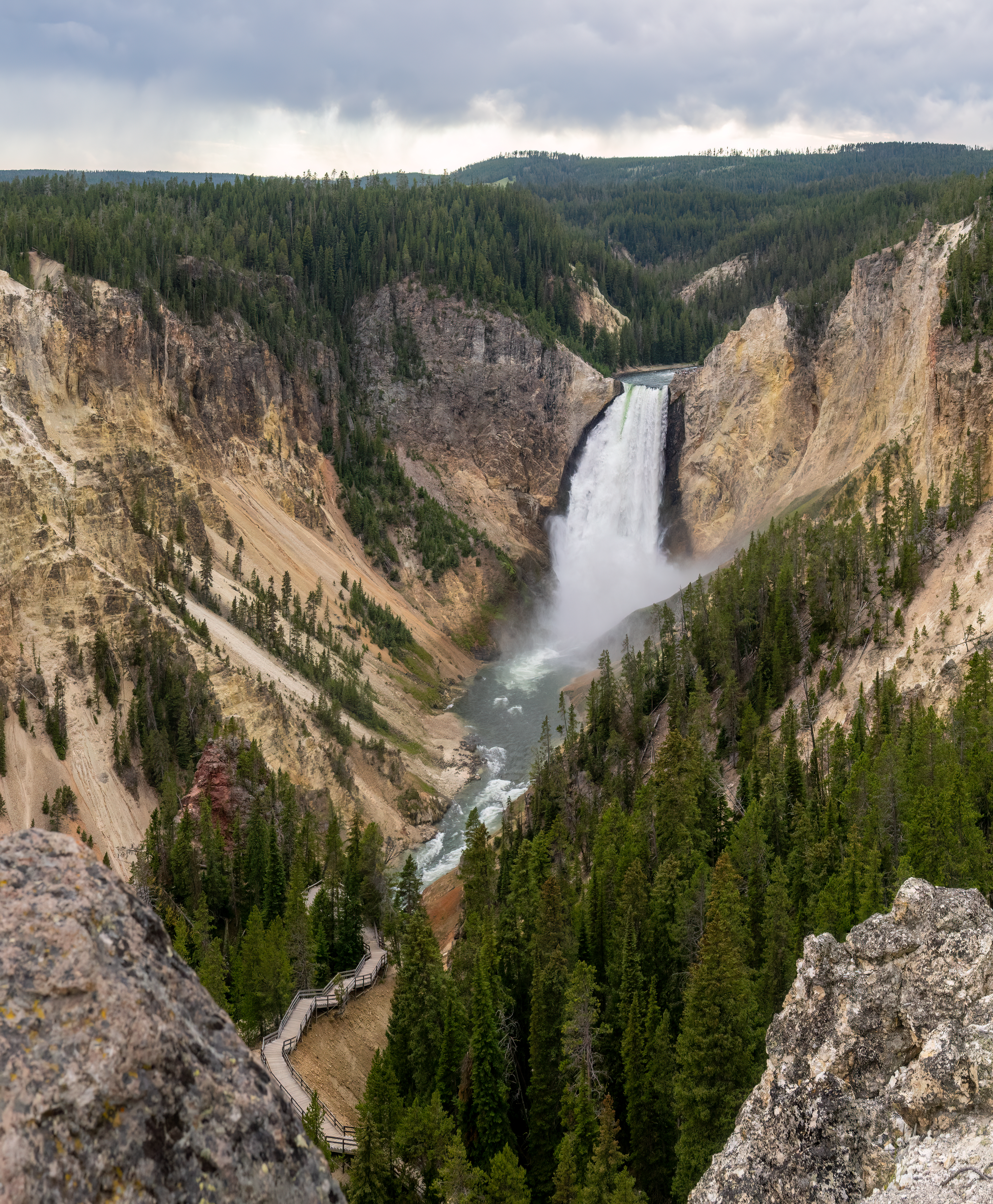
- Grand Canyon of the Yellowstone

- Location within Wyoming Location within the United States
- Interactive map of Yellowstone National Park
- Location: Park and Teton counties, Wyoming; Gallatin and Park counties, Montana; Fremont County, Idaho, United States
- Nearest town: West Yellowstone, Montana
- Coordinates: 44.6°N 110.5°W
- Area: 2,219,791 acres (8,983.18 km^{2})
- Elevation: 8,104 ft (2,470 m)
- Established: March 1, 1872; 154 years ago
- Visitors: 4,762,988 (in 2025)
- Governing body: U.S. National Park Service
- Website: nps.gov/yell

UNESCO World Heritage Site
- Type: Natural
- Criteria: vii, viii, ix, x
- Designated: 1978 (2nd session)
- Reference no.: 28
- Region: The Americas
- Endangered: 1995–2003

Yellowstone National Park is a national park of the United States located mainly in the northwest corner of the state of Wyoming, with small portions extending into Montana and Idaho. The park is known for its wildlife and its many geothermal features, especially the Old Faithful geyser, one of its most popular. While it represents many types of biomes, subalpine forest is the most abundant. It is part of the South Central Rockies forests ecoregion.

Native Americans have lived in the Yellowstone region for at least 11,000 years. While non-native mountain men visited during the early-to-mid-19th century, organized exploration by non-natives did not begin until the late 1860s. The park was established by the 42nd U.S. Congress through the Yellowstone National Park Protection Act and signed into law by President Ulysses S. Grant on March 1, 1872. Yellowstone was the first national park in the US, and is also widely understood to be the first national park in the world.

Management and control of the park originally fell under the jurisdiction of the U.S. Department of the Interior, the first Secretary of the Interior to supervise the park being Columbus Delano. However, the U.S. Army was eventually commissioned to oversee the management of Yellowstone for 30 years between 1886 and 1916. In 1917, the administration of the park was transferred to the National Park Service, which had been created the previous year. Hundreds of structures have been built and are protected for their architectural and historical significance, and researchers have examined more than one thousand indigenous archaeological sites.

Yellowstone National Park spans an area of 3,468.4 sq mi (8,983 km^{2}), with a large variety of lakes and ponds, canyons, rivers, and mountain ranges. Yellowstone Lake is one of the largest high-elevation lakes in North America and covers part of the Yellowstone Caldera, the largest super volcano on the continent. The caldera is considered a dormant volcano. It has erupted with tremendous force twice in the last two million years. Well over half of the world's geysers and hydrothermal features are in Yellowstone, fueled by this ongoing volcanism. Lava flows and rocks from volcanic eruptions cover most of the land area of Yellowstone. The park is the centerpiece of the Greater Yellowstone Ecosystem, the largest remaining nearly intact ecosystem in the Earth's northern temperate zone. In 1978, Yellowstone was named a UNESCO World Heritage Site.

Hundreds of species of mammals, birds, fish, reptiles, and amphibians have been documented, including several that are either endangered or threatened. The vast forests and grasslands also include unique species of plants. Yellowstone Park is the largest and most famous megafauna location in the contiguous United States. The park is inhabited by grizzly bears, cougars, wolves, and free-ranging herds of bison and elk. The Yellowstone Park bison herd is the oldest and largest public bison herd in the United States. Forest fires occur in the park each year; in the large forest fires of 1988, over one-third of the park was burnt. Yellowstone has numerous recreational opportunities, including hiking, camping, boating, fishing, and sightseeing. Paved roads provide close access to the major geothermal areas as well as some of the lakes and waterfalls. During the winter, visitors often access the park by way of guided tours that use either snow coaches or snowmobiles in the snowy weather.

== Name ==
The Yellowstone area is known by many names in surviving Native American languages, for instance pashaka ("white mountain country") in Assiniboine, aw' pawishe ("land of steam") in Crow, and memut neespah ("boiling earth") in Nez Perce. The English name "Yellowstone" derives from the Hidatsa term for the Yellowstone River, miʔcíiriaashish, which was translated as "Yellow Stone" in 1797 during the expedition of Canadian explorer David Thompson.

== History ==
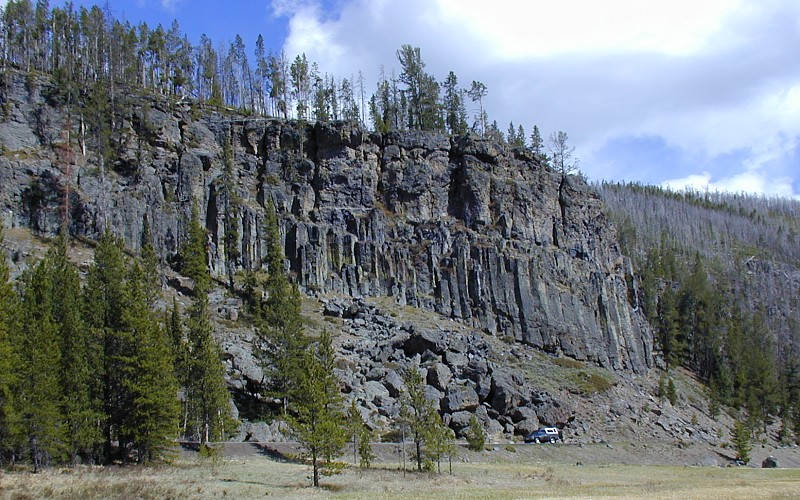
Exposed rock at Obsidian Cliff

=== Pre-Columbian era ===
The archaeological record shows continuous use of the Yellowstone region by Native Americans from the earliest era of human presence in the Americas (the Lithic stage, prior to 8500 BC) through to the national park's founding. During the construction of the post office in Gardiner, Montana, in the 1950s, an obsidian point of Clovis origin was found that dated from approximately 11,000 years ago. The earliest consistent visits to Yellowstone are linked to the Cody complex circa 7300 BC. The Mummy Cave site indicates that the Cody complex followed migrating bison herds to Yellowstone and regularly mined obsidian from Obsidian Cliff. Excavations within the park show that Cody people camped on the eastern side of Yellowstone Lake during the summers, fishing and boating on the lake and hunting bear, deer, and bison.

Use of Obsidian Cliff peaked in the Late Prehistoric period (1000 BC–1000 AD). Thousands of pounds of obsidian was transported thousands of miles to Ohio using the Missouri, Mississippi, and Ohio rivers between roughly 200 BC–400 AD for use as ceremonial goods by the Hopewell Culture. Hopewell grave goods include not only obsidian, but also copper shaped to resemble the horns of bighorn sheep native to the Rockies, which suggests the Hopewell may have visited Yellowstone themselves.

More recently, around 500–1000 AD, the Shoshone summered on the southern end of Yellowstone Lake. It is likely that regular visits to Yellowstone by the Crow, Nez Perce, Blackfoot, and Salish peoples also began in the pre-Columbian era, although archaeological findings are lacking. In oral traditions, the Shoshone, Blackfoot, and Salish recall women gathering cinnabar and other resources at Obsidian Cliff and making prayers there. Pre-Columbian peoples managed Yellowstone's forest ecosystem using low-intensity fires. They were aware that fire produced green grass which would attract bison.

=== Late Native use and Western exploration ===
The arrival of European horses, followed eventually by mountain men and fur traders in the Rocky Mountains, slowly began to impact the Yellowstone region in the mid-nineteenth century. The Shoshone were the first Rocky Mountain tribe to obtain horses in the early 1700s, but the Shoshone tribe which lived within Yellowstone, the Tukudeka (Sheepeaters), did not make use of horses, instead tracking bighorn sheep on foot. From the 1840s, the Bannock people (Kutsutɨkaˀa) regularly rode from their home territory near Henrys Lake through Mammoth Hot Springs and along what is now the northern stretch of the Grand Loop Road on the way to buffalo hunts in the Bighorn Mountains, in the lands of the Crow people (Apsáalooke). This route, called the Great Bannock Trail by park rangers, allowed the Bannock to regularly fraternize with the Crow, their allies against the Blackfoot Confederacy (Niitsítapi).

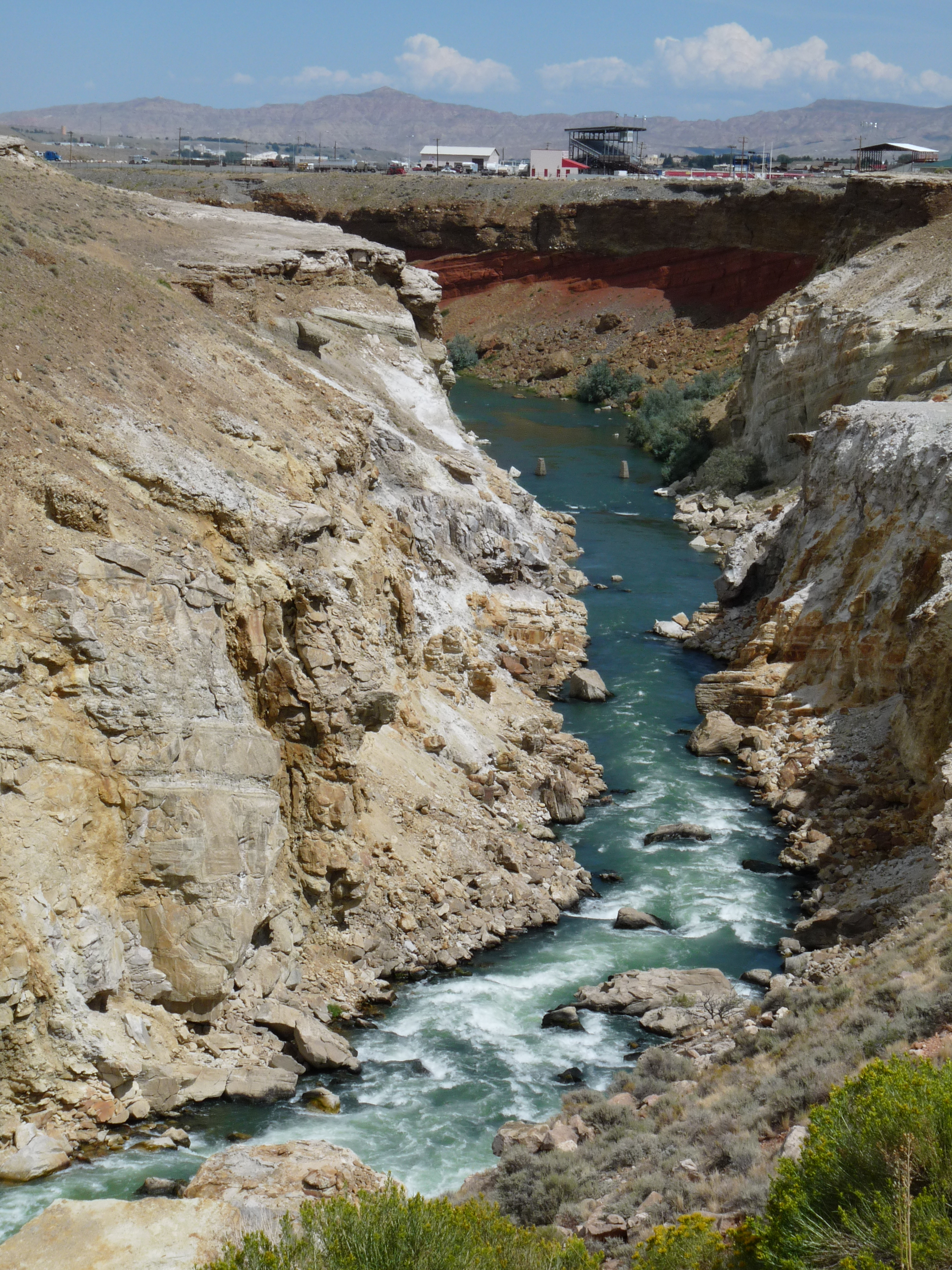
Colter's Hell near Cody, Wyoming, one of the first geothermal sites to be spotted by mountain men

The first written report of unusual features at Yellowstone came in the form of second-hand accounts mentioned in a letter written to James Wilkinson in September 1805. In winter of 1807–1808, John Colter, who had earlier been a member of the Lewis and Clark Expedition, passed through what later became the northeast corner of the park, near Tower Fall. He described a particularly active geothermal site outside of the present-day park as "hell" due to its sulphuric smell, and Washington Irving later dubbed it "Colter's Hell," a name that has stuck. Colter is the first American citizen known to have entered the park, although his exact route is hotly contested. Over the next 40 years, numerous reports from mountain men and trappers such as Jim Bridger told of boiling mud, steaming rivers, and petrified trees, but these were considered little more than dubious rumors. By 1863, there was some understanding of the region's basic geography and natural features but still no detailed, written account.

In spring 1864, a group of Piegan Blackfeet led the Belgian Jesuit Xavier Kuppens on a tour of the geysers and other major attractions, which they were familiar with. In 1865, Kuppens shared details of what he saw with regional political leaders including Montana Territory Governor Thomas Francis Meagher, who may have suggested preserving the region as a national park, although this conversation was only recalled decades later. From 1866–68, local curiosity about the Yellowstone region was interrupted by Red Cloud's War.

=== The first national park ===
The concept of a national park in the American West had been first proposed in 1833 by painter George Catlin, who suggested that America could benefit from maintaining a home where Native Americans could continue their traditional patterns of land use. Catlin was joined in 1837 by Washington Irving, who suggested that national parks could provide "a last refuge to the Indian," and in 1858 by Henry David Thoreau, who suggested a "national preserve" for animals, landscapes, and "some even of the hunter race." By the 1860s, in the wake of many American Indian Wars and genocides, public opinion had shifted towards confining Native Americans to Indian reservations; the "national park" was, in turn, reimagined as a pristine wilderness free of human activity. (Note: While antagonism towards Indians is sometimes described as originating a "Yellowstone model" for national parks which empty them of preexisting human presence, park managers outside of the United States have historically used a variety of models to inform their administration and preservation policies.) Apparently acting on a spoken suggestion from Governor Meagher, figures such as lawyer Cornelius Hedges and Congressman William D. Kelley began writing in support of preserving Yellowstone this way around 1870. (Note: Northern Pacific Railroad manager A.B. Nettleton, forwarding Kelley's comments to F.V. Hayden, was the first to put into writing that Yellowstone ought to be called a "public park.")

The first detailed expedition to the Yellowstone area was the Cook–Folsom–Peterson Expedition of 1869, which consisted of three privately funded explorers. The Folsom party followed the Yellowstone River to Yellowstone Lake. The members of the Folsom party recorded their findings in a journal. Based on the information it reported, a party of Montana residents organized the Washburn–Langford–Doane Expedition in 1870, headed by the surveyor-general of Montana Henry Washburn, and including Nathaniel P. Langford (who later became known as "National Park" Langford) and a U.S. Army detachment commanded by Lt. Gustavus Doane. The expedition spent about a month exploring the region, collecting specimens, and naming sites of interest. Among other findings, the Washburn Expedition discovered that one of the large geysers erupted regularly every 90 minutes and therefore named it Old Faithful. The successful expedition was a media sensation, and many writers predicted that Yellowstone's wonders would attract sightseers.

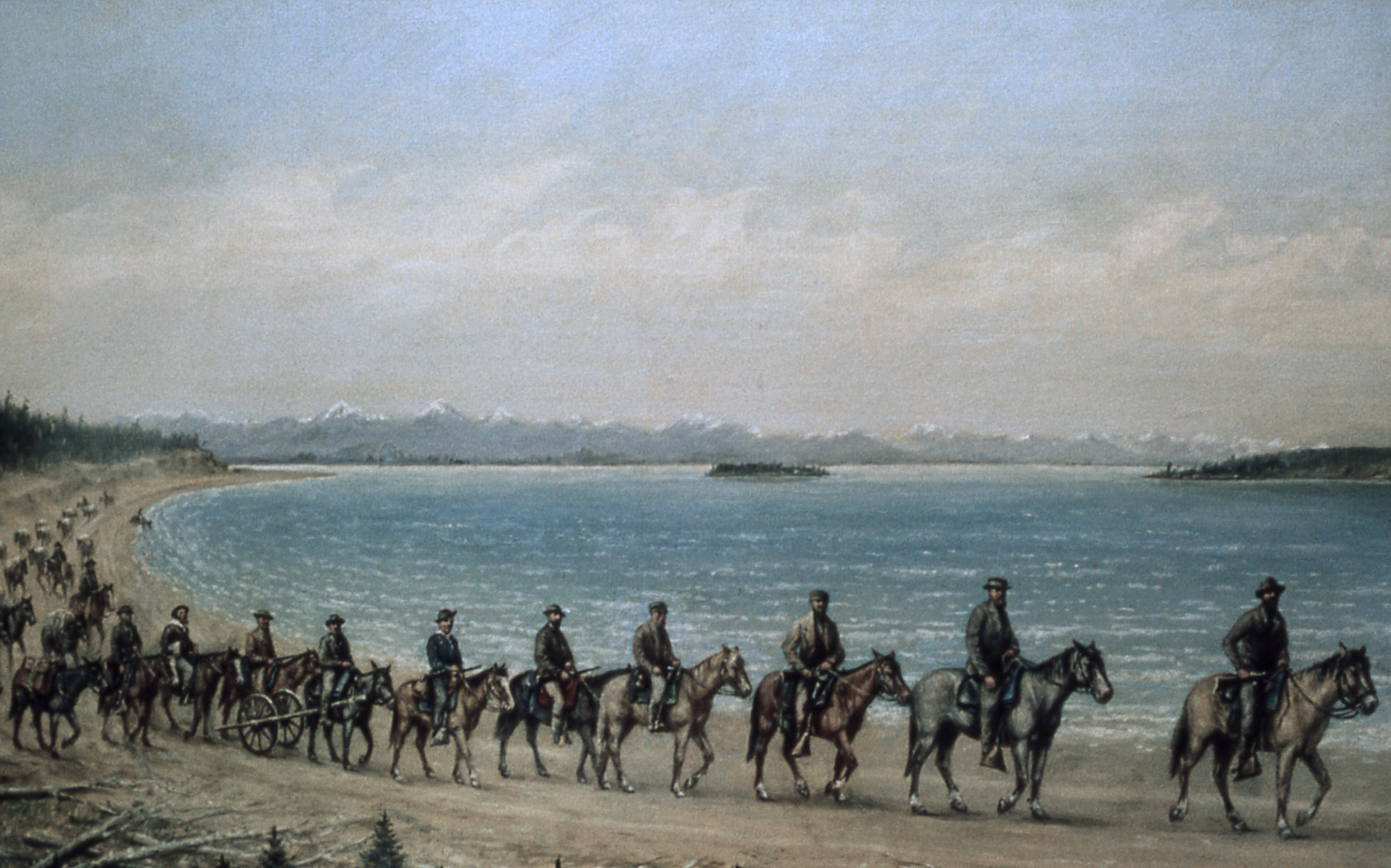
Hayden Geological Survey at Yellowstone Lake. Illustration by William Henry Jackson, 1871

In 1871, Ferdinand V. Hayden was able to explore the region, eleven years after a failed first attempt. Hayden's government-sponsored expedition resulted in a comprehensive report, the Hayden Geological Survey of 1871, including large-format photographs by William Henry Jackson and paintings by Thomas Moran. The report helped to convince the U.S. Congress to withdraw this region from public auction. Hayden informed the Committee on Public Lands that if Yellowstone were not preserved immediately, "vandals who are now waiting to enter into this wonder-land, will in a single season despoil, beyond recovery, these remarkable curiosities, which have required all the cunning skill of nature thousands of years to prepare". On March 1, 1872, President Ulysses S. Grant signed an Act of Dedication, which demarcated Yellowstone as "dedicated and set apart as a public park or pleasuring ground for the benefit and enjoyment of the people."

=== Early civil and military administration ===
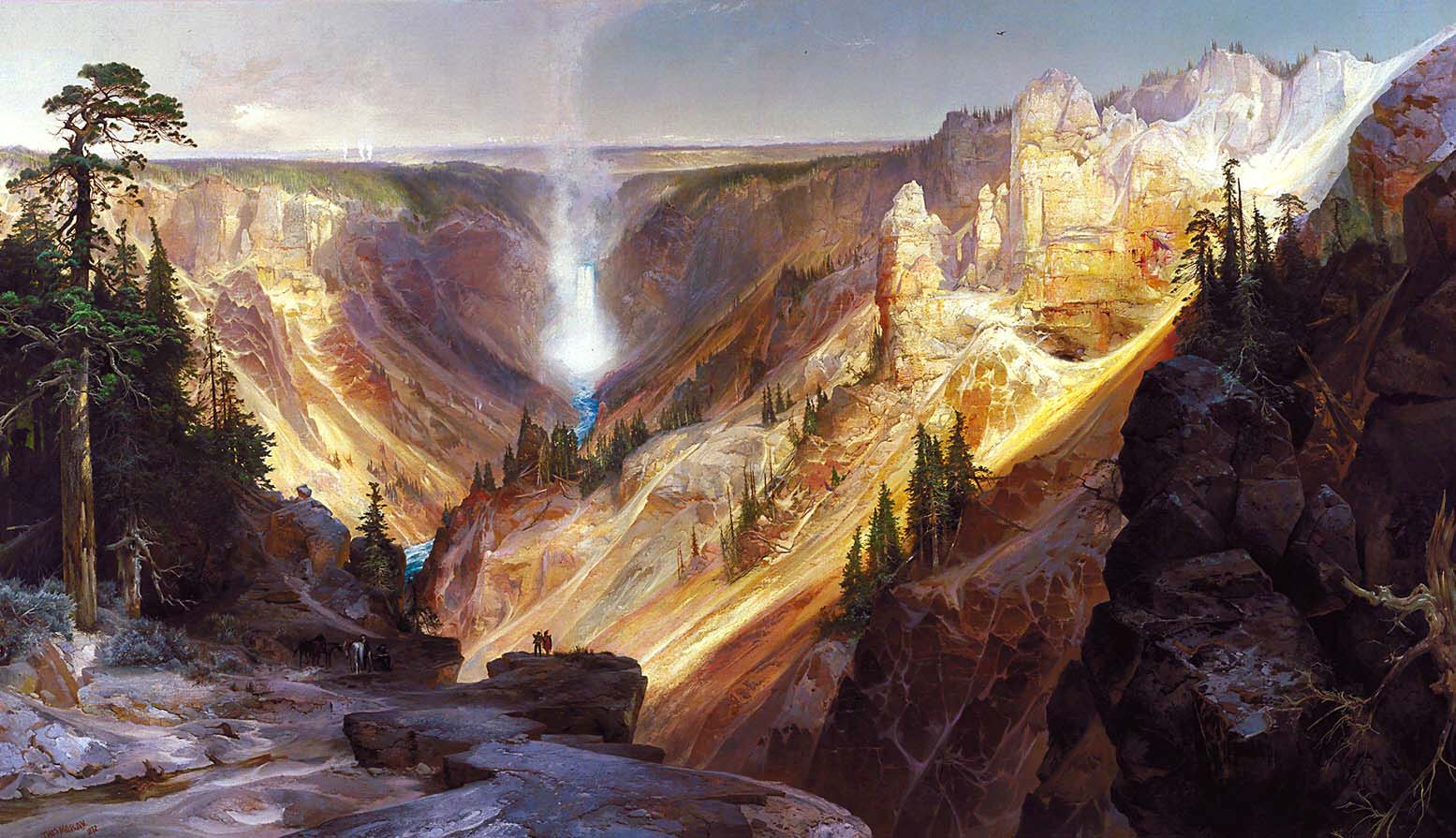
The Grand Canyon of the Yellowstone (1872), a painting by Hayden survey participant Thomas Moran, demonstrated the grandeur of the new park to American viewers

Nathaniel P. Langford was appointed as Yellowstone's first superintendent in 1872, but Congress denied him salary, funding, or staff; Yellowstone Park was opposed by local mining and logging interests. Langford was unable to make any improvements to the park, but he understood the importance of defending Yellowstone from pollution and poaching and saw its value as a natural attraction, correctly predicting in his first annual report that it would eventually become internationally famous.

In the early years after its designation, Yellowstone served as a military outpost from which the United States Army planned raids into the Sioux territory of the Black Hills to the east. In 1875, Colonel William Ludlow, a veteran of the Indian Wars who had previously explored areas of Montana under the command of George Armstrong Custer, was ordered to survey the new park to determine appropriate sites for building forts. (Note: Ludlow's survey included letters and attachments by other expedition members, including naturalist and mineralogist George Bird Grinnell. Grinnell documented the poaching of buffalo, deer, elk, and antelope for hides: "It is estimated that during the winter of 1874–1875, not less than 3,000 buffalo and mule deer suffer even more severely than the elk, and the antelope nearly as much.") In April 1877, Langford was replaced by Philetus Norris, who soon faced a number of crises from neighboring tribes. During the 1877 Nez Perce War, nine park visitors were taken captive by Nez Perce fleeing the U.S. Army, and two were killed in skirmishes. In the 1878 Bannock War, the Bannock asserted rights over the Great Bannock Trail and raided a United States Geological Survey party there and captured their livestock (without any injuries or deaths), causing Norris to cut a trail for military use from Mammoth through Obsidian Cliffs down to the Upper Geyser Basin. In the aftermath of the Sheepeater Indian War of 1879, Norris built a fort to prevent Native Americans from entering the national park. Norris expressed gratitude for the comparatively friendly relations the Crow people had established with park officials and urged Congress to grant them land north of the park boundary.

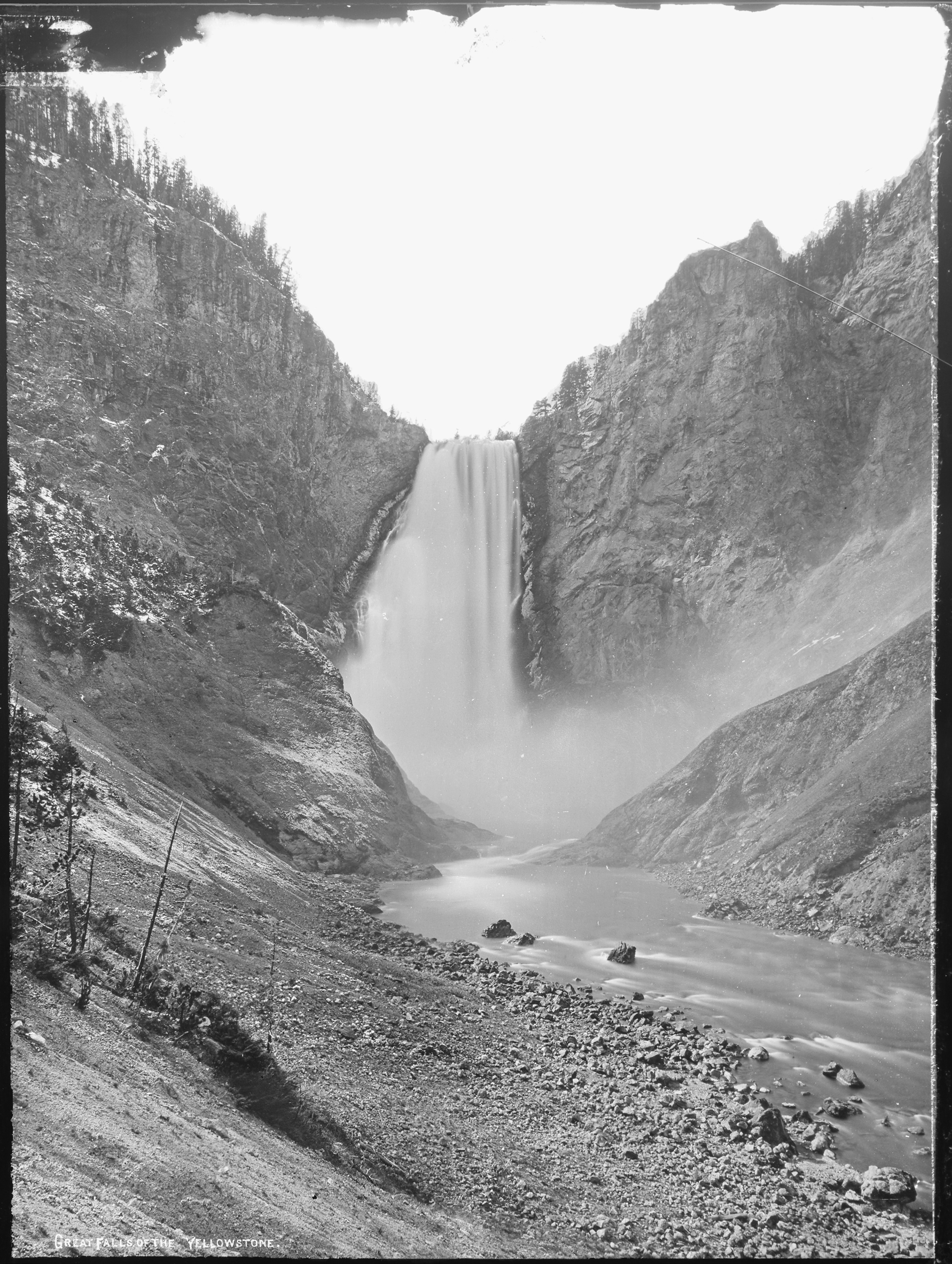
Great Falls of the Yellowstone, U.S. Geological and Geographic Survey of the Territories (1874–1879), photographer William Henry Jackson

In 1880, Harry Yount was appointed as a gamekeeper to control poaching and vandalism in the park. Yount had previously spent decades exploring the mountain country of present-day Wyoming, including the Grand Tetons, after joining F V. Hayden's Geological Survey in 1873. Yount is the first national park ranger, and Yount's Peak, at the head of the Yellowstone River, was named in his honor. These measures proved insufficient, as neither Norris nor the three superintendents who followed were given sufficient manpower or resources.

During the 1870s and 1880s, Native American tribes were effectively excluded from the national park. Under a half-dozen tribes had made seasonal use of the Yellowstone area — the only year-round residents were the Tukudeka, the band of Eastern Shoshone called the "Sheepeaters". They left the area under the assurances of a treaty negotiated in 1868, under which the Sheepeaters ceded their lands but retained the right to hunt in Yellowstone. The United States never ratified the treaty and refused to recognize the claims of the Sheepeaters or any other tribe that had used Yellowstone.

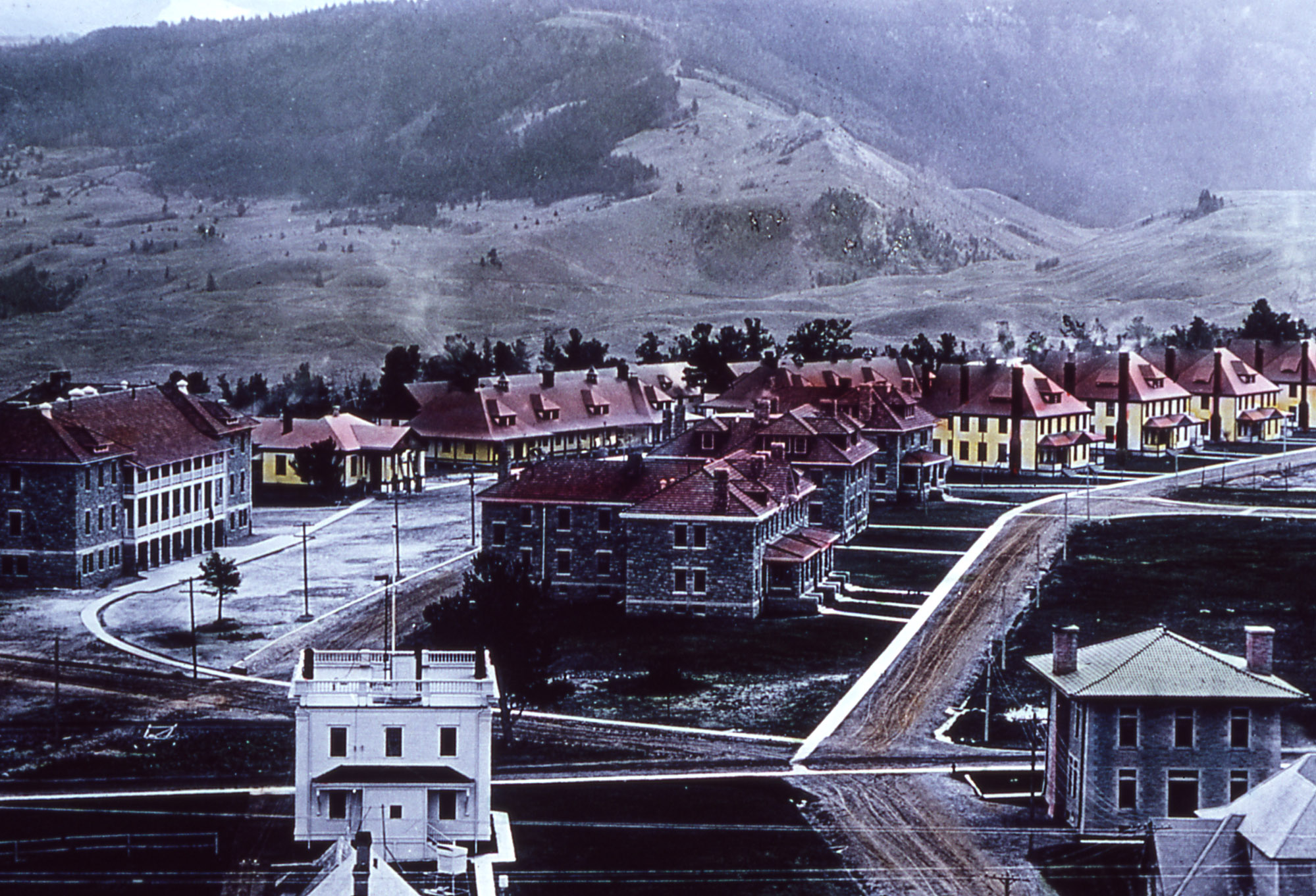
Fort Yellowstone (circa 1910), formerly a U.S. Army post, now serves as park headquarters

The Northern Pacific Railroad built a train station in Livingston, Montana, as a gateway terminus to connect to the northern entrance area in 1883, which helped to increase visitation from 300 in 1872 to 5,000 in 1883. The spur line was completed in fall of that year from Livingston to Cinnabar for stage connection to Mammoth, then in 1902 extended to Gardiner station, where passengers also switched to stagecoach. Visitors in these early years faced poor and dusty roads as well as limited services; automobiles were first admitted in phases in 1915. By 1901 a Chicago, Burlington & Quincy connection opened via Cody and in 1908 a Union Pacific Railroad connection to West Yellowstone, followed by a 1927 Milwaukee Road connection to Gallatin Gateway near Bozeman, also motorcoaching visitors via West Yellowstone. Rail visitation fell off considerably by World War II and ceased regular service in favor of the automobile around the 1960s, though special excursions occasionally continued into the early 1980s.

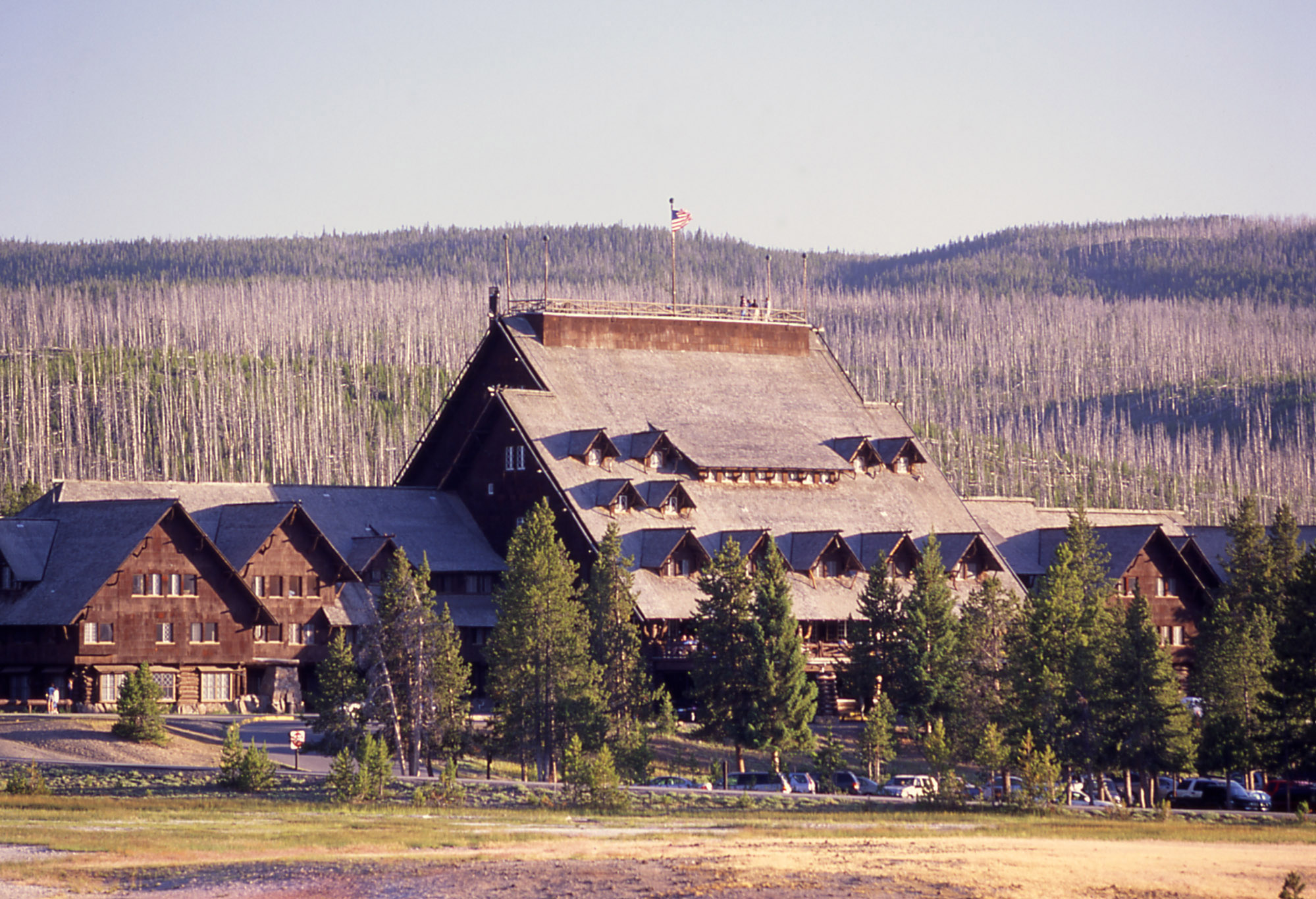
Old Faithful Inn, constructed 1904, serves Yellowstone. It is perhaps the largest log building in the world

Ongoing poaching and destruction of natural resources continued unabated until the U.S. Army arrived at Mammoth Hot Springs in 1886 and built Camp Sheridan. Over the next 22 years, as the army constructed permanent structures, Camp Sheridan was renamed Fort Yellowstone. On May 7, 1894, the Boone and Crockett Club, acting through the personality of George G. Vest, Arnold Hague, William Hallett Phillips, W. A. Wadsworth, Archibald Rogers, Theodore Roosevelt, and George Bird Grinnell were successful in carrying through the Park Protection Act, which saved the park. The Lacey Act of 1900 provided legal support for the officials prosecuting poachers. With the funding and manpower necessary to keep a diligent watch, the army developed its own policies and regulations that permitted public access while protecting park wildlife and natural resources. When the National Park Service was created in 1916, many of the management principles developed by the army were adopted by the new agency. The army turned control over to the National Park Service on October 31, 1918.

In 1898, the naturalist John Muir described the park as follows:

However orderly your excursions or aimless, again and again amid the calmest, stillest scenery you will be brought to a standstill hushed and awe-stricken before phenomena wholly new to you. Boiling springs and huge deep pools of purest green and azure water, thousands of them, are plashing and heaving in these high, cool mountains as if a fierce furnace fire were burning beneath each one of them; and a hundred geysers, white torrents of boiling water and steam, like inverted waterfalls, are ever and anon rushing up out of the hot, black underworld.

=== Automobiles and further development ===
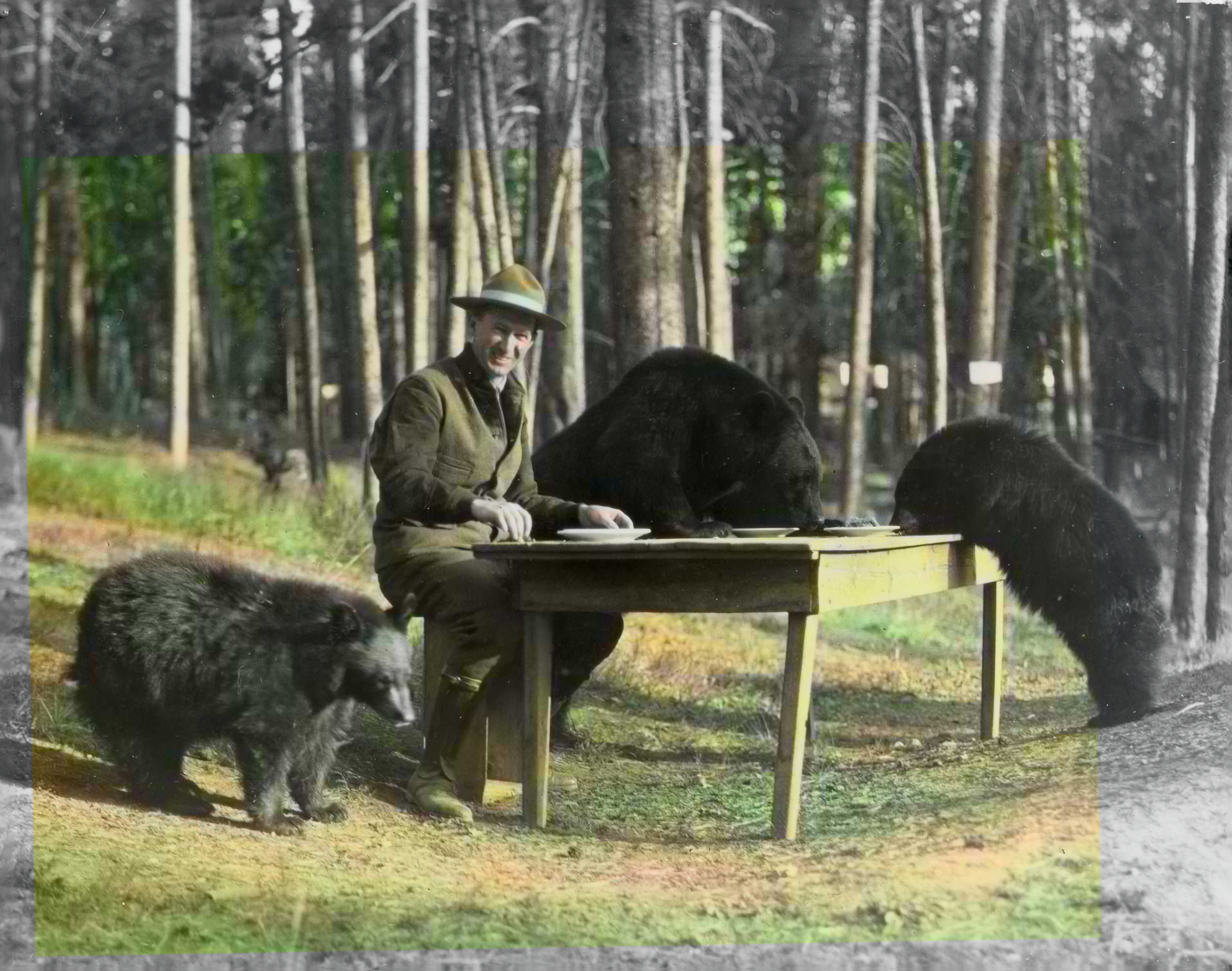
Superintendent Horace M. Albright and black bears (1922). Tourists often fed black bears in the park's early years, with 527 injuries reported from 1931 to 1939.

In August 1915, NPS director Stephen Mather decided to open Yellowstone to automobile traffic on a trial basis. The trial showed that cars would increase visitation, and Mather quickly moved to end horse-and-buggy access in 1917, giving tour operators the bare minimum of time to purchase a fleet of cars. Yellowstone had originally been serviced primarily from the north entrance, but the advent of automobiles arriving from all directions caused park officials to build new facilities in the west, south, and northeast entrances from 1924 through 1935.

In 1921 the Mammoth School opened. Mather and the wife of the park superintendent set up the school, and Mather, and park superintendent himself appointed members of the school board. Its permanent facility opened in 1963. In 2008 the Mammoth School closed, and it after that began housing a preschool and community center.

The Civilian Conservation Corps (CCC), a New Deal relief agency for young men, played a major role between 1933 and 1942 in developing Yellowstone facilities. CCC projects included reforestation, campground development of many of the park's trails and campgrounds, trail construction, fire hazard reduction, and fire-fighting work. The CCC built the majority of the early visitor centers, campgrounds, and the current system of park roads.

During World War II, tourist travel fell sharply, staffing was cut, and many facilities fell into disrepair. By the 1950s, visitation increased tremendously in Yellowstone and other national parks. To accommodate the increased visitation, park officials implemented Mission 66, an effort to modernize and expand park service facilities. Planned to be completed by 1966, in honor of the 50th anniversary of the founding of the National Park Service, Mission 66 construction diverged from the traditional log cabin style with design features of a modern style. During the late 1980s, most construction styles in Yellowstone reverted to the more traditional designs. After the enormous forest fires of 1988 damaged much of Grant Village, structures there were rebuilt in the traditional style. The visitor center at Canyon Village, which opened in 2006, incorporates a more traditional design as well.

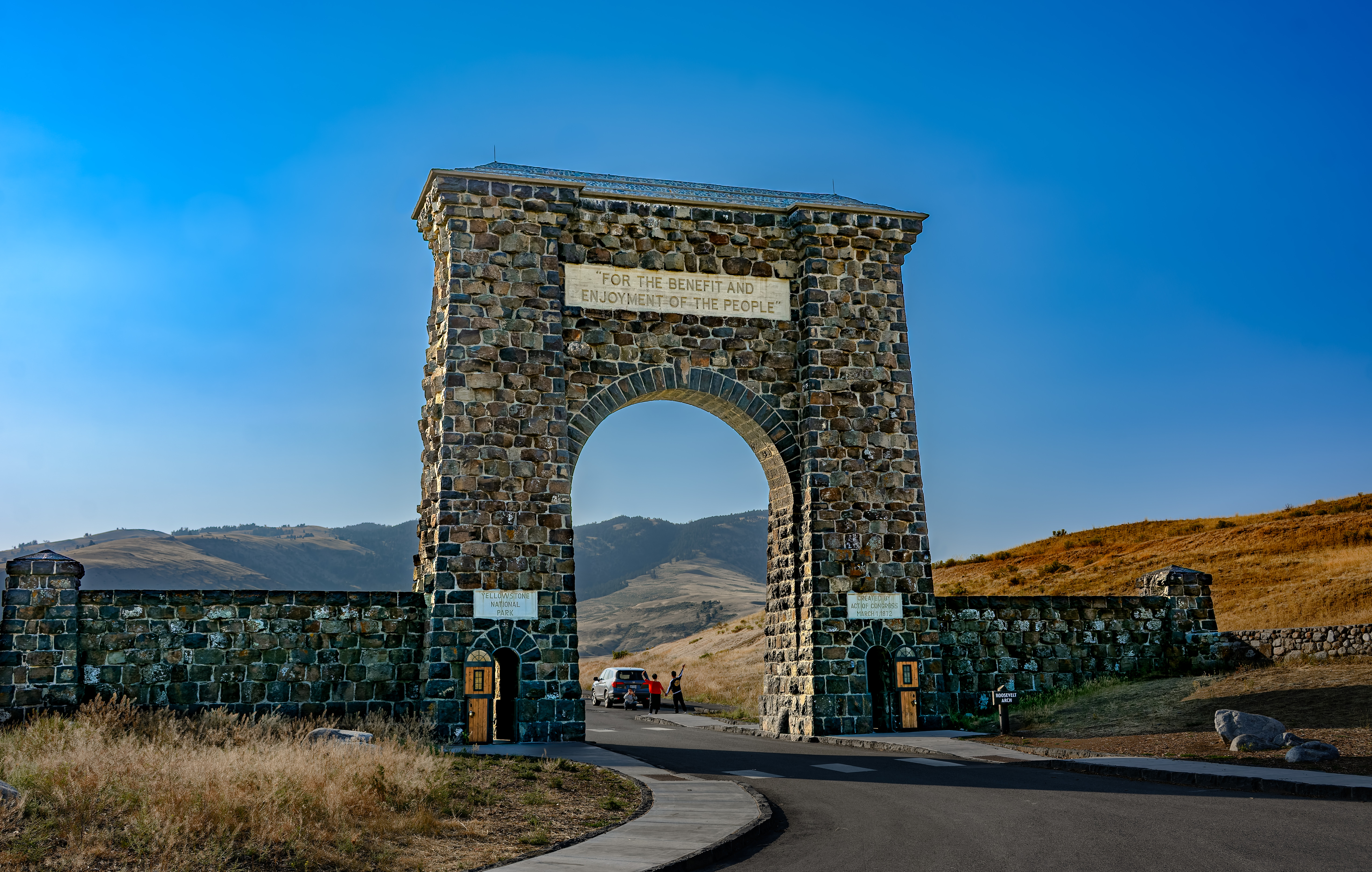
The Roosevelt Arch in Gardiner, Montana, at the north entrance

The 1959 Hebgen Lake earthquake just west of Yellowstone at Hebgen Lake damaged roads and some structures in the park. In the northwest section of the park, new geysers were found, and many existing hot springs became turbid. It was the most powerful earthquake to hit the region in recorded history.

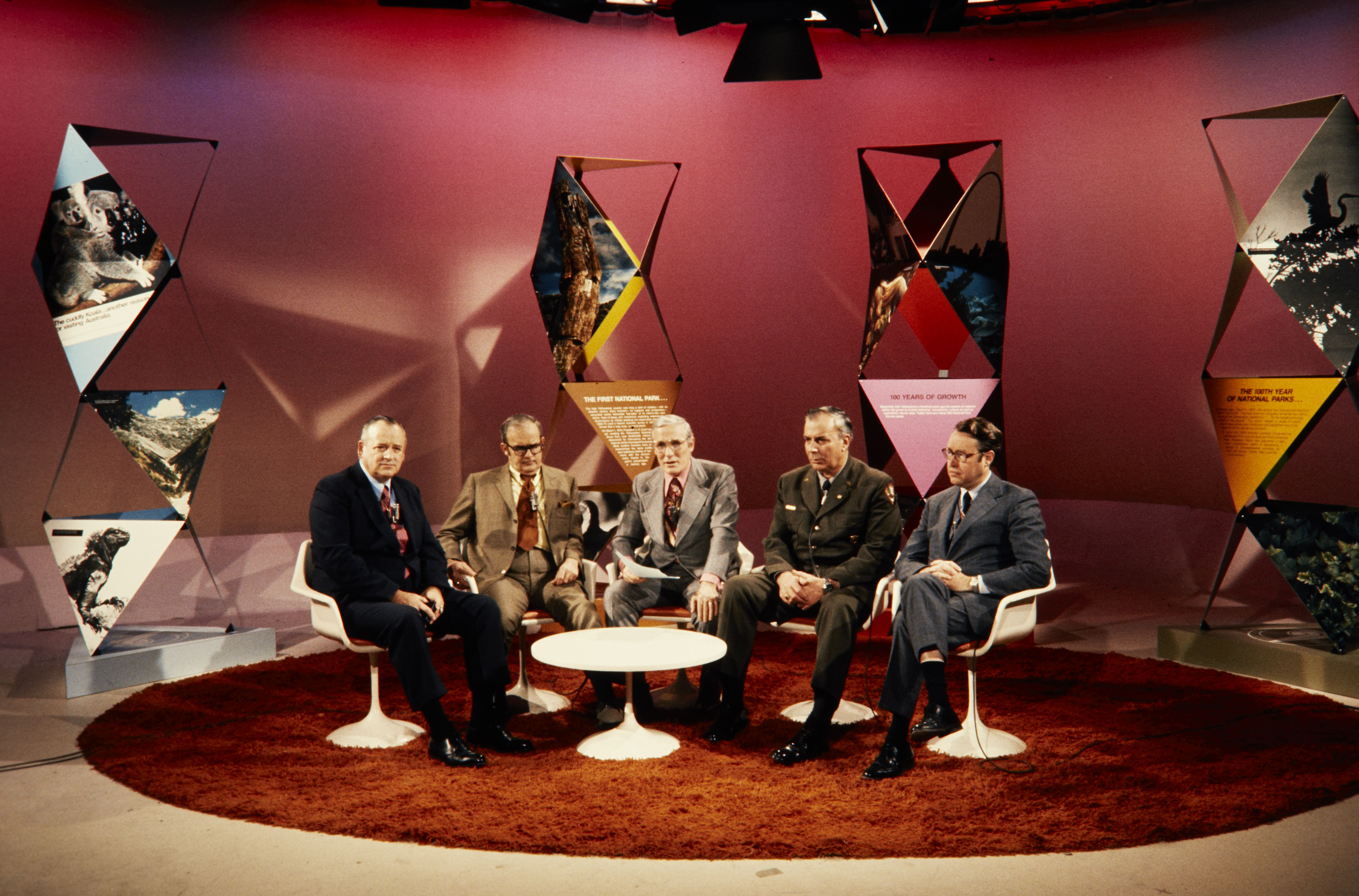
NPS staff sitting on the set for the 1972 Centennial for the creation of the first National Park, in a NBC Today Show. Left to right: George Hartzog, William Everhart, Frank McGee and Jack K. Anderson.

In 1963, after several years of public controversy regarding the forced reduction of the elk population in Yellowstone, the United States Secretary of the Interior Stewart Udall appointed an advisory board to collect scientific data to inform future wildlife management of the national parks. In a paper known as the Leopold Report, the committee observed that culling programs at other national parks had been ineffective, and recommended the management of Yellowstone's elk population.

In 2024 $40,000,000 was given to the park via the National Park Foundation to establish additional employee housing as housing prices rise in nearby communities and as units in those communities are turned into short-term rentals. The donor did not reveal their identity. 70 housing units are scheduled to be built. In 2020, around 400 employees of the park, about half, lived in the park's housing for staff.

== Geography ==
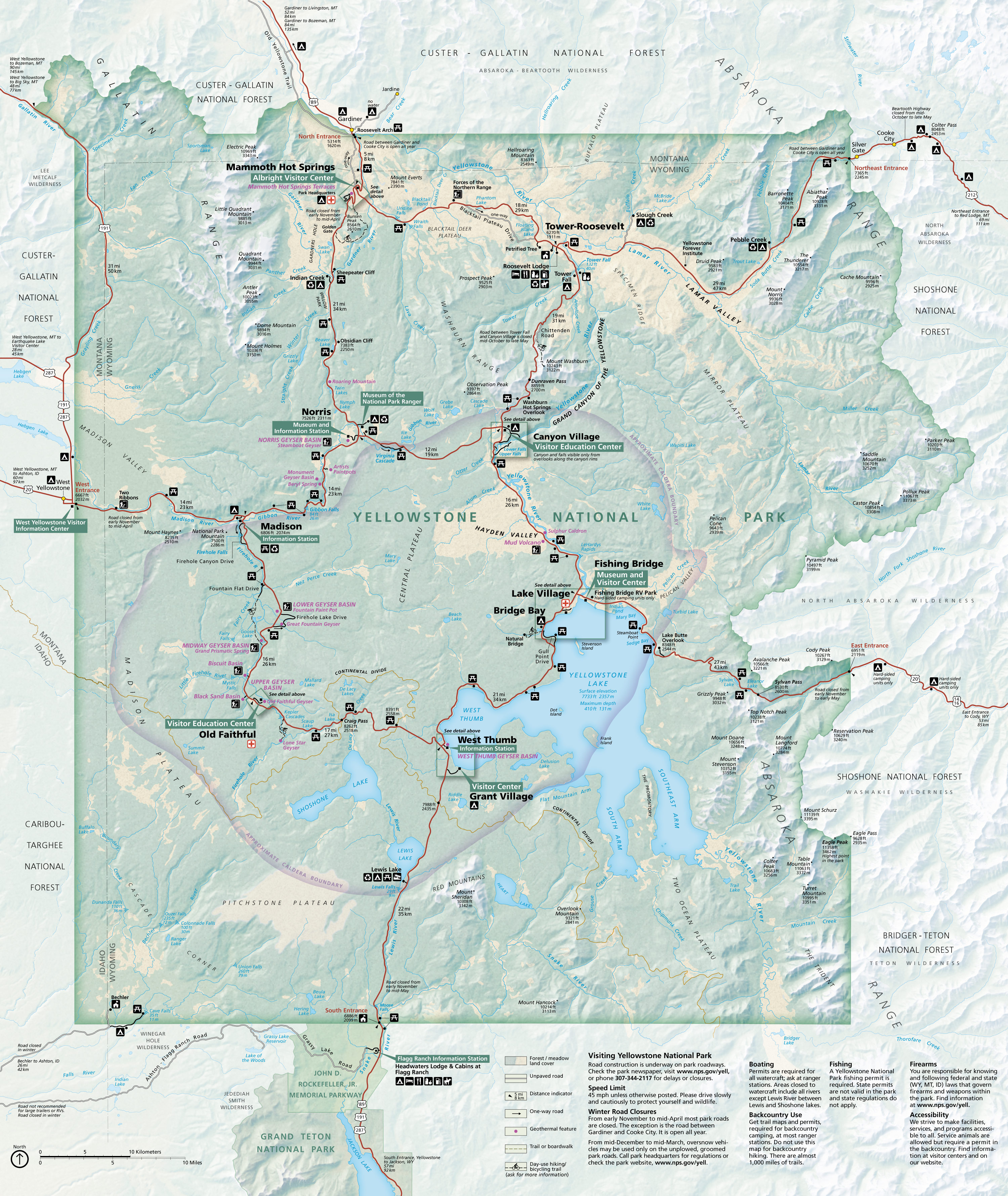
Official park map c. 2020 (click on map to enlarge)

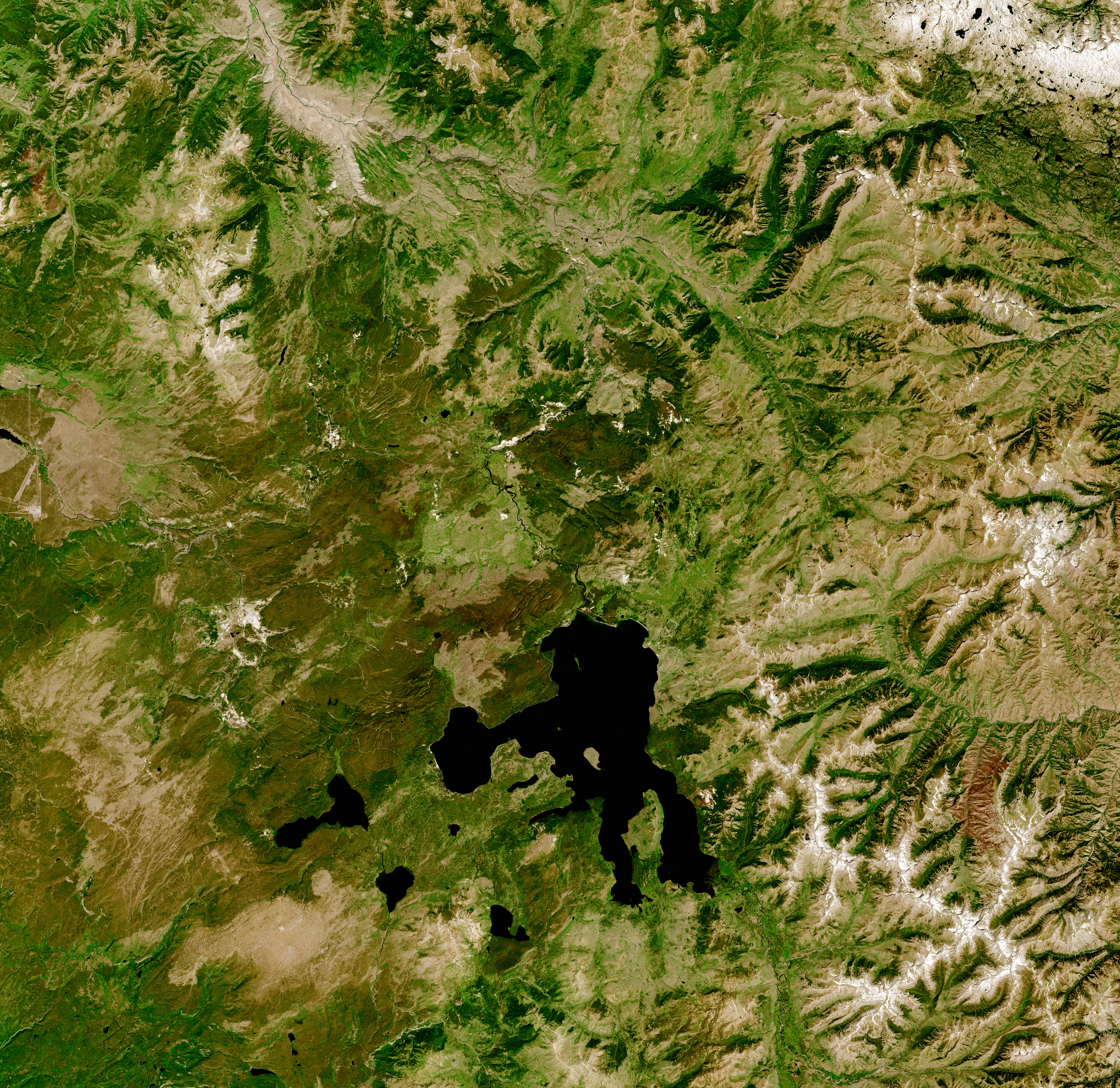
Satellite image of Yellowstone National Park in 2020

Interactive map of Yellowstone National Park

Yellowstone National Park occupies a roughly square parcel of volcanic complex that jogs slightly beyond the northwestern corner of Wyoming. Approximately 96 percent of the total land area of Yellowstone National Park is located within the state of Wyoming. Another three percent is within Montana, with the remaining one percent in Idaho. Montana's portion of Yellowstone contains multiple trails, facilities and swimming holes, while the Idaho portion of the park is completely undeveloped. The irregular eastern boundary of the national park follows the height of land along the Absaroka Range.

The park is 63 miles (101 km) north to south, and 54 miles (87 km) west to east by air. Yellowstone is 2,219,789 acres (8,983 km^{2}; 3,468 sq mi) in area, larger than either of the states of Rhode Island or Delaware. Rivers and lakes cover five percent of the land area, with the largest water body being Yellowstone Lake at 87,040 acres (352 km^{2}; 136 sq mi). Yellowstone Lake is up to 400 feet (120 m) deep and has 110 miles (180 km) of shoreline. At an elevation of 7,733 feet (2,357 m) above sea level, Yellowstone Lake is the largest high-elevation lake in North America. Forests comprise 80 percent of the land area of the park; most of the rest is grassland.

Yellowstone is at the northeastern end of the Snake River Plain, a great bow-shaped arc through the mountains that extends roughly 400 miles (640 km) from the park to the Idaho-Oregon border. The Continental Divide of North America runs diagonally through the southwestern part of the park. The divide is a topographic feature that separates the Pacific Ocean and Atlantic Ocean water drainages. About one-third of the park lies on the west side of the divide. The origins of the Yellowstone River and Snake River are near each other but on opposite sides of the divide. As a result, the waters of the Snake River flow to the Pacific Ocean, while those of the Yellowstone find their way to the Gulf of Mexico.

The park sits on the Yellowstone Plateau, at an average elevation of 8,000 feet (2,400 m) above sea level. The plateau is bounded on nearly all sides by mountain ranges of the Middle Rocky Mountains, which range from 9,000 to 11,000 feet (2,700 to 3,400 m) in elevation. The highest point in the park is atop Eagle Peak (11,358 feet or 3,462 metres) and the lowest is along Reese Creek (5,282 feet or 1,610 metres). Nearby mountain ranges include the Gallatin Range to the northwest, the Beartooth Mountains in the north, the Absaroka Range to the east, the Teton Range to the south, and the Madison Range to the west. The most prominent summit on the Yellowstone Plateau is Mount Washburn at 10,243 feet (3,122 m).

Yellowstone National Park has one of the world's largest petrified forests, trees which were long ago buried by ash and soil, and were gradually replaced by mineral materials. This ash and other volcanic debris are believed to have come from the park area itself as the central part of Yellowstone is the massive caldera of a supervolcano. The park contains 290 waterfalls of at least 15 feet (4.6 m), the highest being the Lower Falls of the Yellowstone River at 308 feet (94 m).

Three deep canyons are located in the park, cut through the volcanic tuff of the Yellowstone Plateau by rivers over the last 640,000 years. The Lewis River flows through Lewis Canyon in the south, and the Yellowstone River has carved two colorful canyons, the Grand Canyon of the Yellowstone and the Black Canyon of the Yellowstone in its journey north.

== Geology ==
=== Volcanism ===
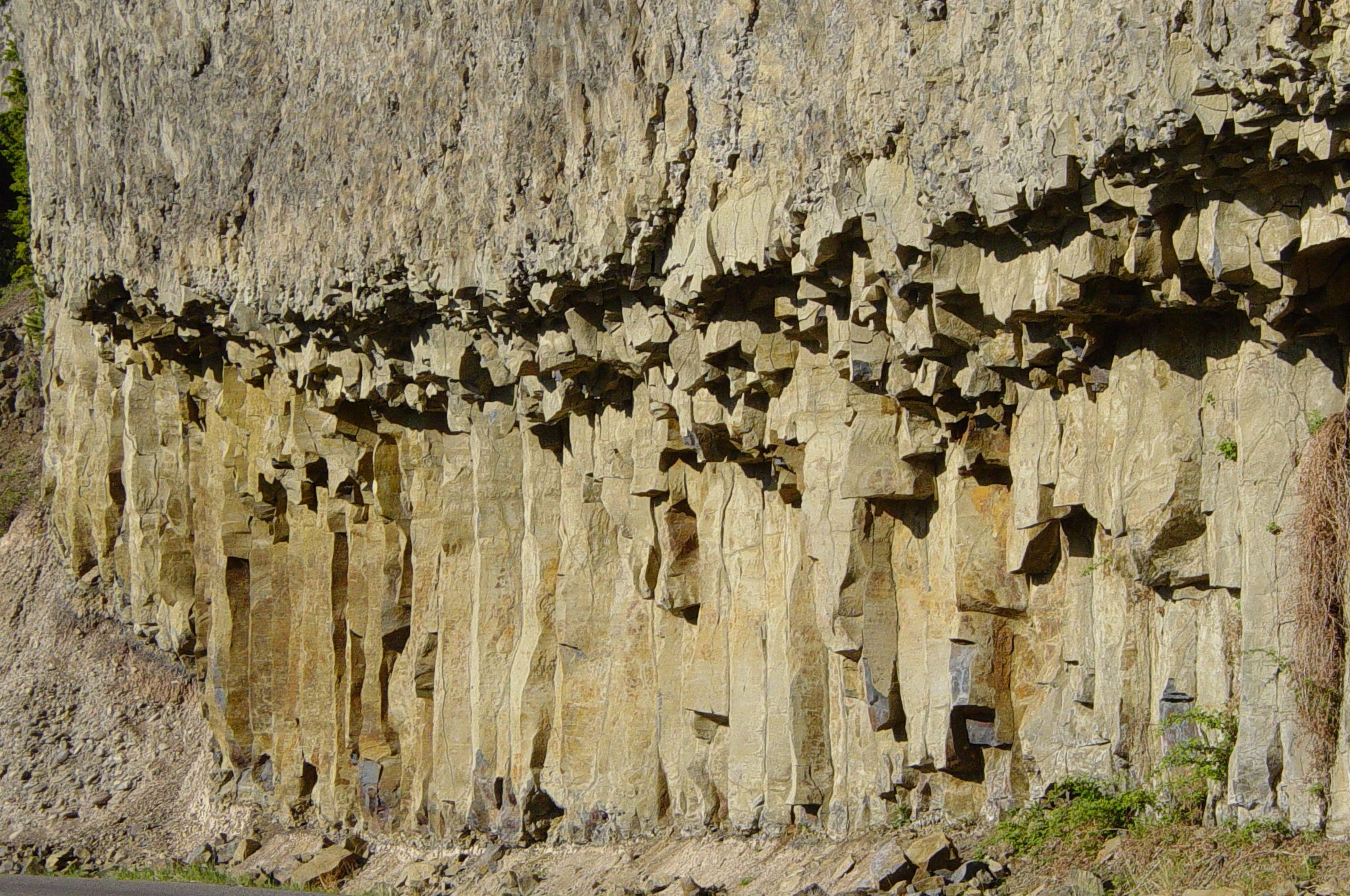
Columnar basalt near Tower Fall; large floods of basalt and other lava types preceded mega-eruptions of superheated ash and pumice.

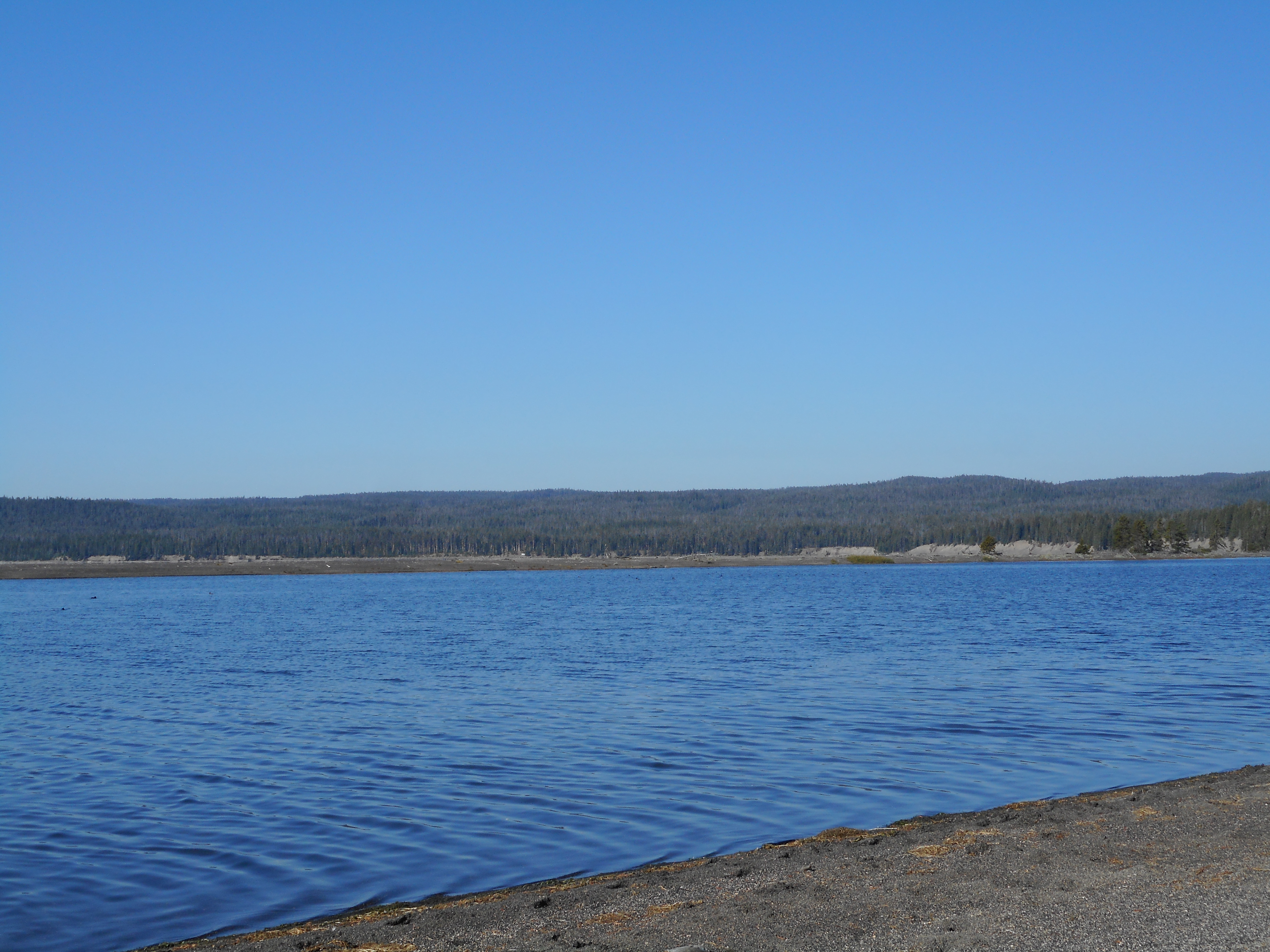
Caldera rim on the horizon south of Yellowstone Lake

The unique natural features of Yellowstone are produced by the Yellowstone hotspot, a section of the North American tectonic plate which has been gradually drifting northeast over a massive mantle plume. Over the millennia, volcanic activity has produced rhyolite eruptions and calderas in the region, the most visible of which is the Yellowstone Caldera. Streams draining out of the volcanic plateau wore the landscape into large valleys and canyons such as the Grand Canyon of the Yellowstone.

The Yellowstone hotspot is the largest volcanic system in North America, and worldwide it is only rivaled by the Lake Toba Caldera on Sumatra. It has been termed a supervolcano because the caldera was formed by exceptionally large explosive eruptions. The magma chamber that lies under Yellowstone is estimated to be a single connected chamber, about 37 miles (60 km) long, 18 miles (29 km) wide, and 3 to 7 miles (4.8 to 11.3 km) deep. The Yellowstone Caldera, nearly 5/8 mile (1.0 km) deep and 45 by 28 miles (72 by 45 km) in area, was created by a cataclysmic eruption that occurred 640,000 years ago, which released more than 240 mi^{3} (1,000 km^{3}) of ash, rock and pyroclastic materials. The eruption also deposited the Lava Creek Tuff, a welded tuff geologic formation. The most violent known eruption over the hotspot, which occurred 2.1 million years ago, ejected 588 mi^{3} (2,450 km^{3}) of volcanic material and created the rock formation known as the Huckleberry Ridge Tuff and the Island Park Caldera. A smaller eruption ejected 67 mi^{3} (280 km^{3}) of material 1.3 million years ago, forming the Henry's Fork Caldera and depositing the Mesa Falls Tuff.

Each of the three climactic eruptions released vast amounts of ash that blanketed much of central North America, falling many hundreds of miles away. The amount of ash and gases released into the atmosphere probably caused significant impacts on world weather patterns and led to the extinction of some species, primarily in North America. A smaller caldera-forming eruption occurred about 160,000 years ago. It formed the caldera that contains the West Thumb of Yellowstone Lake. Since the last supereruption, a series of smaller eruptive cycles between 640,000 and 70,000 years ago, has nearly filled in the Yellowstone Caldera with 80 different eruptions of rhyolitic lavas such as those that can be seen at Obsidian Cliffs and basaltic lavas which can be viewed at Sheepeater Cliff. Lava strata are most easily seen at the Grand Canyon of the Yellowstone, where the Yellowstone River continues to carve into the ancient lava flows. The canyon is a typical V-shaped valley, indicative of river-type erosion rather than erosion caused by glaciation.

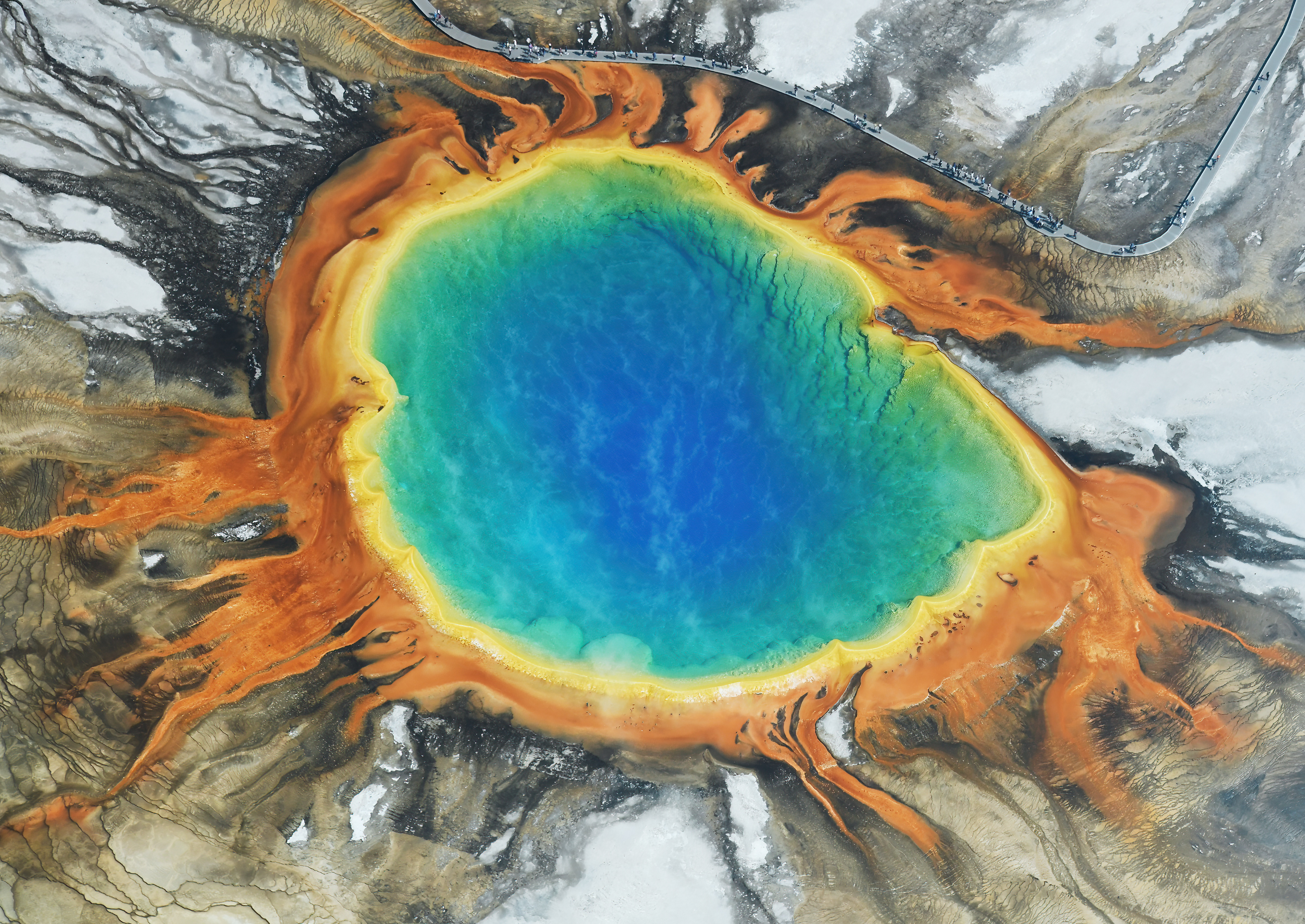
Boardwalks allow visitors to safely approach the thermal features, such as Grand Prismatic Spring

Each eruption is part of an eruptive cycle that climaxes with the partial collapse of the roof of the volcano's partially emptied magma chamber. This creates a collapsed depression, called a caldera, and releases vast amounts of volcanic material, usually through fissures that ring the caldera. The time between the last three cataclysmic eruptions in the Yellowstone area has ranged from 600,000 to 800,000 years; however, the small number of such climactic eruptions cannot be used to make an accurate prediction for future volcanic events.

=== Geysers and the hydrothermal system ===
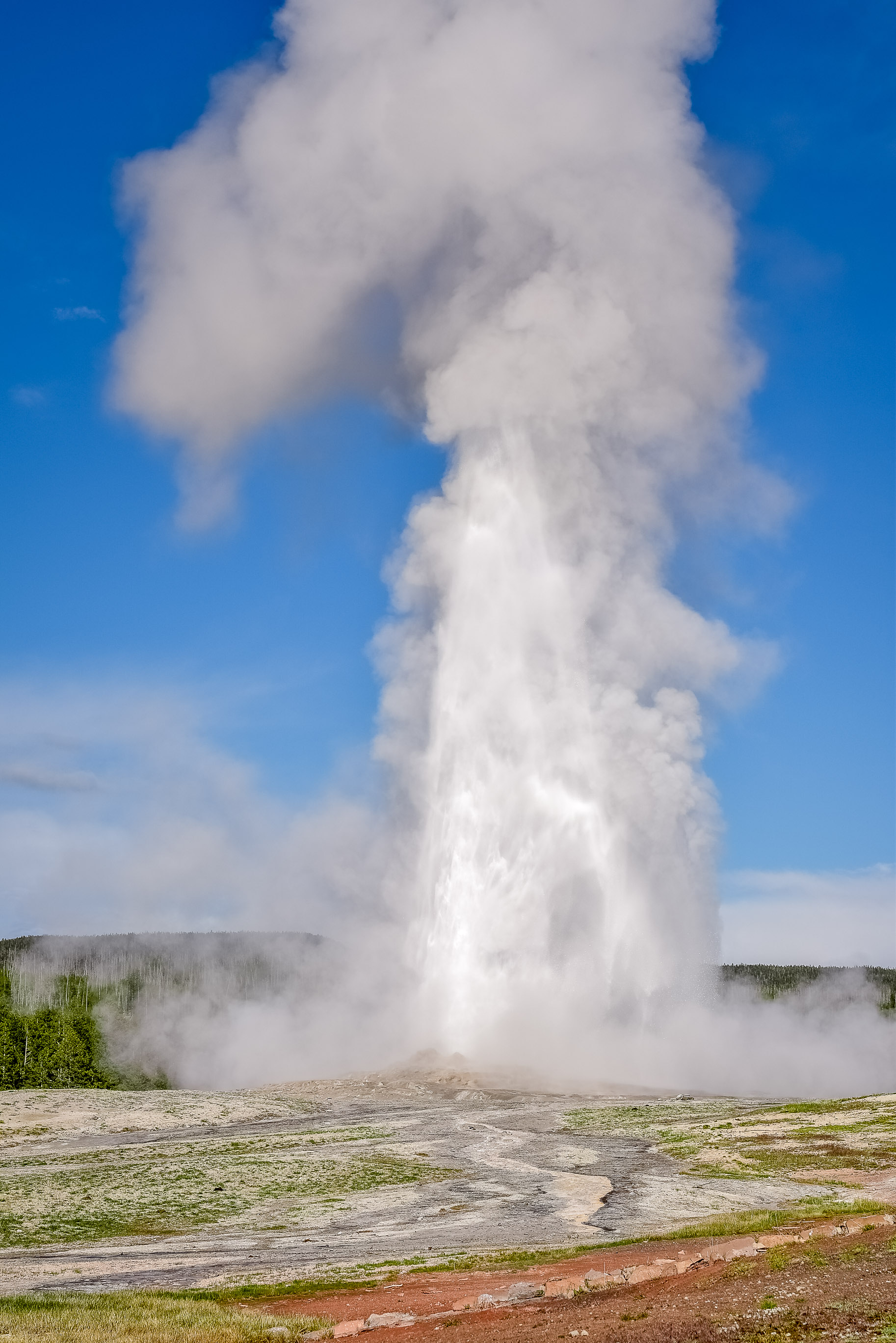
Old Faithful erupts approximately every 90 minutes.

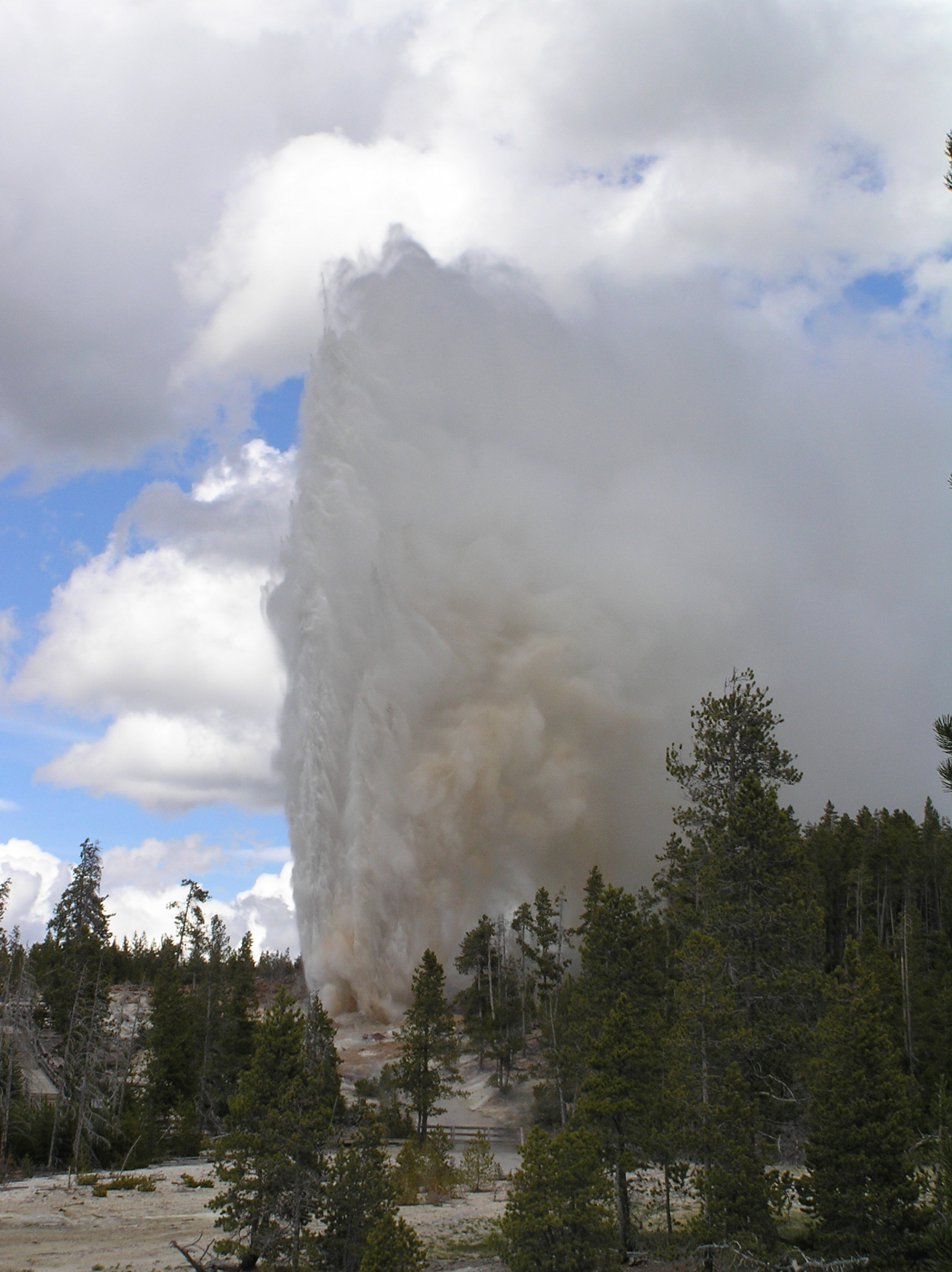
Steamboat Geyser is the world's largest active geyser.

The most famous geyser in the park, and perhaps the world, is Old Faithful geyser, located in Upper Geyser Basin. Castle Geyser, Lion Geyser, Beehive Geyser, Grand Geyser (the world's tallest predictable geyser), Giant Geyser (the world's most voluminous geyser), Riverside Geyser and numerous other geysers are in the same basin. The park contains the tallest active geyser in the world—Steamboat Geyser in the Norris Geyser Basin. A study that was completed in 2011 found that at least 1,283 geysers have erupted in Yellowstone. Of these, an average of 465 are active in a given year. Yellowstone contains at least 10,000 geothermal features altogether, including geysers, hot springs, mudpots, and fumaroles. Two-thirds of all the world's geysers are concentrated in Yellowstone.

In May 2001, the U.S. Geological Survey, Yellowstone National Park, and the University of Utah created the Yellowstone Volcano Observatory (YVO), a partnership for long-term monitoring of the geological processes of the Yellowstone Plateau volcanic field, for disseminating information concerning the potential hazards of this geologically active region.

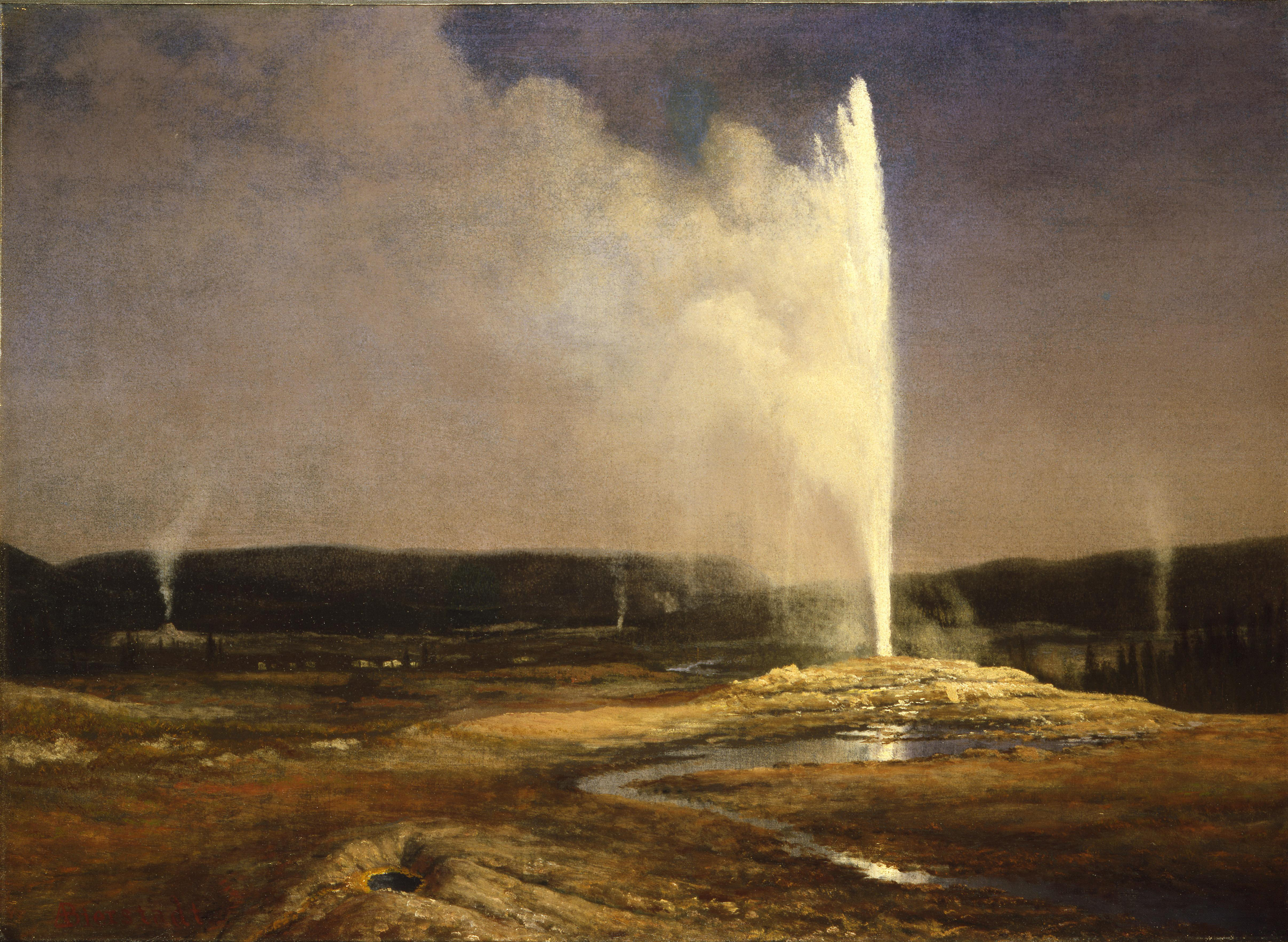
Albert Bierstadt, Geysers in Yellowstone, 1881

In 2003, changes at the Norris Geyser Basin resulted in the temporary closure of some trails in the basin. New fumaroles were observed, and several geysers showed enhanced activity and increasing water temperatures. Several geysers became so hot that they were transformed into purely steaming features; the water had become superheated and they could no longer erupt normally. This coincided with the release of reports of a multiple year United States Geological Survey research project which mapped the bottom of Yellowstone Lake and identified a structural dome that had uplifted at some time in the past. Research indicated that these uplifts posed no immediate threat of a volcanic eruption, since they may have developed long ago, and there had been no temperature increase found near the uplifts. Most recently, in July 2024, a hydrothermal explosion occurred in Biscuit Basin.

A Biscuit Basin hydrothermal explosion was a small volcanic event that occurred at Yellowstone National Park on June 13, 2026. It took place near the Black Diamond Pool, a thermal area located less than two miles northwest of Old Faithful. United States Geological Survey (USGS) scientists found that boiling water between 185 °F and 200 °F had rushed into the nearby Firehole River through three newly formed ground vents, turning into steam and triggering the blast. The event permanently altered the local landscape by tearing open a 61-foot-long ground crack, ejecting large rocks, and collapsing the terrain into a new, vigorously boiling pool that occasionally spouts water 20 to 30 feet into the air. Following the incident, geologists set up temporary seismic equipment to monitor the unstable volcanic network.

=== Earthquakes ===
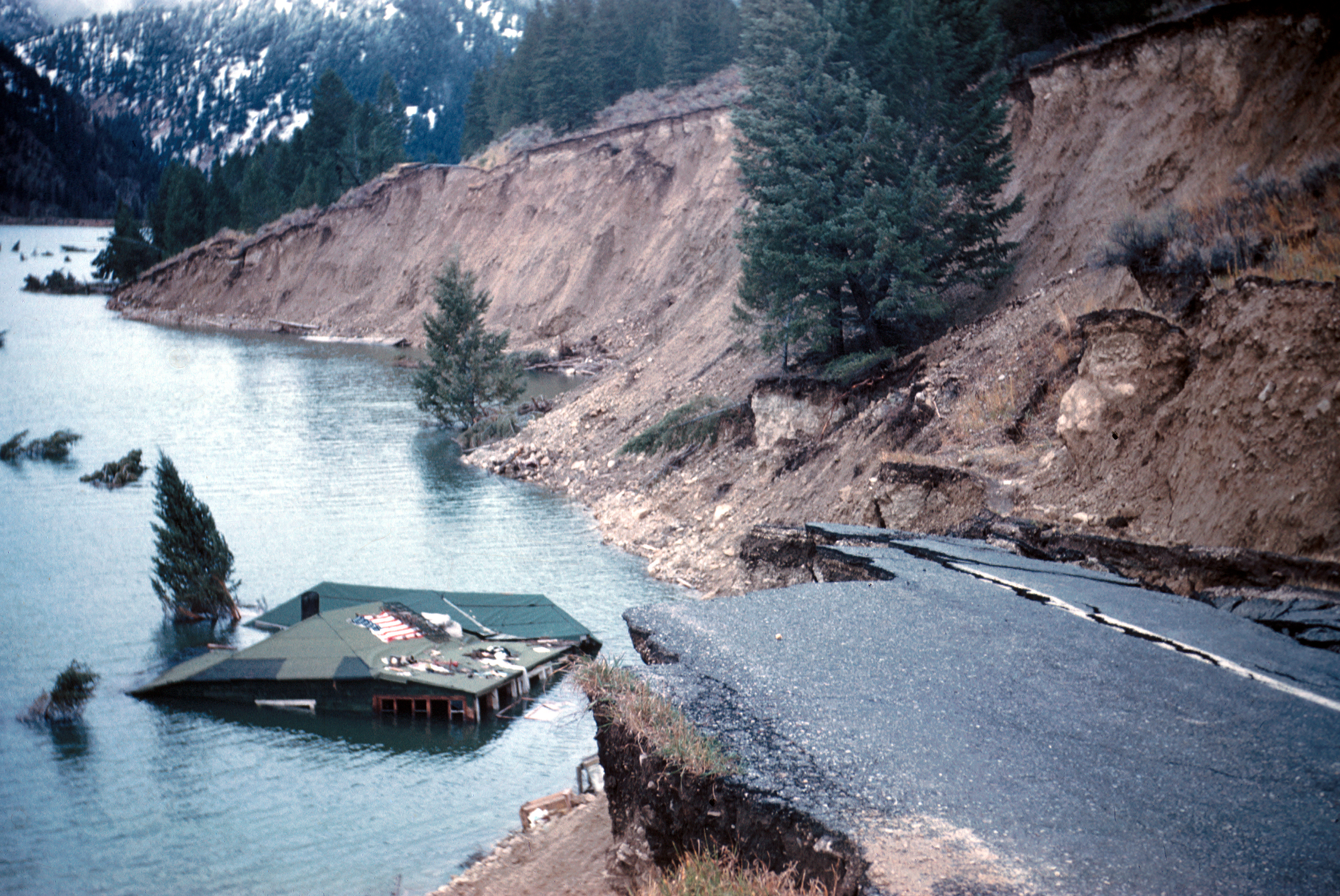
Infrastructure damage at Hebgen Lake due to the 7.2 magnitude earthquake of 1959

Yellowstone experiences thousands of small earthquakes every year, virtually all of which are undetectable to people. About 2/3 of the earthquakes occur in an area between Hegben Lake and the Yellowstone Caldera along a buried fracture zone left from the 2.1 mya eruption.

There have been six earthquakes with at least magnitude 6 or greater in historical times, including the 7.2‑magnitude Hebgen Lake earthquake which occurred just outside the northwest boundary of the park in 1959. This quake triggered a huge landslide, which caused a partial dam collapse on Hebgen Lake; immediately downstream, the sediment from the landslide dammed the river and created a new lake, known as Earthquake Lake. Twenty-eight people were killed, and property damage was extensive in the immediate region. The earthquake caused some geysers in the northwestern section of the park to erupt, large cracks in the ground formed and emitted steam, and some hot springs that normally have clear water turned muddy. The stress created in the fracture zone by this quake is theorized to be responsible for the current quake activity in the northwestern section of Yellowstone. A 6.1‑magnitude earthquake struck inside the park on June 30, 1975, but the damage was minimal.

On average, Yellowstone has 1,000 to 3,000 small earthquakes every year. On March 30, 2014, a magnitude 4.8 earthquake struck near the middle of Yellowstone near the Norris Basin at 6:34 am; reports indicated no damage. This was the largest earthquake to hit the park since February 22, 1980.

== Biology and ecology ==
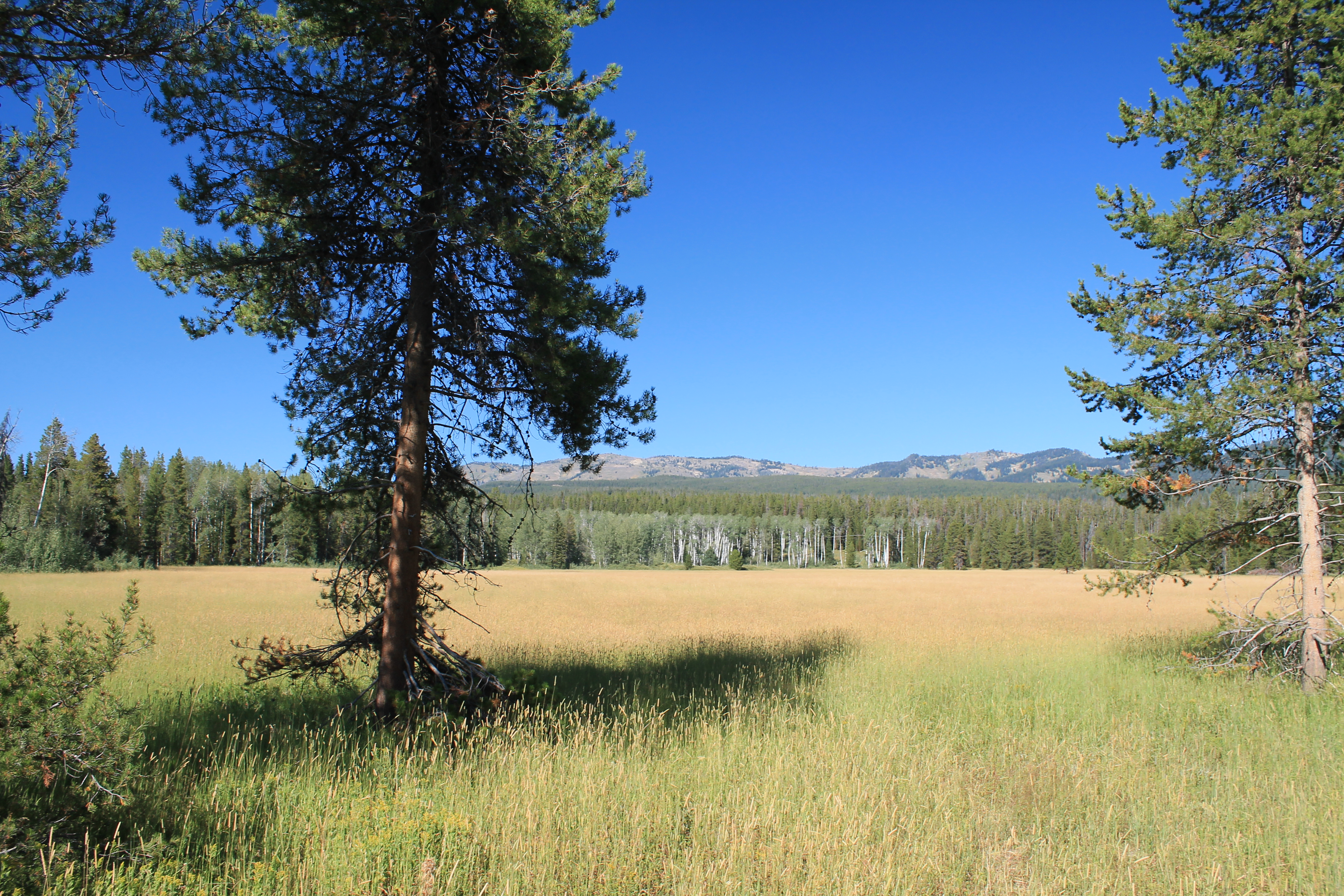
Meadow in Yellowstone National Park

Yellowstone National Park is the centerpiece of the 20 million acres (80,940 km^{2}; 31,250 mi^{2}) Greater Yellowstone Ecosystem, a region that includes Grand Teton National Park, adjacent National Forests and expansive wilderness areas in those forests. The ecosystem is the largest remaining continuous stretch of mostly undeveloped pristine land in the contiguous United States, considered the world's largest intact ecosystem in the northern temperate zone. With the successful wolf reintroduction program, which began in the 1990s, much of the original faunal and floral species known to inhabit the region when the first explorers entered the area can be found there. The site is home to a key field observation site for the National Ecological Observatory Network.

=== Flora ===
Over 69,000 species of trees and other vascular plants are native to the park. Another 170 species are considered to be exotic species and are non-native. Of the eight conifer tree species documented, lodgepole pine forests cover 80% of the total forested areas. Other conifers, such as subalpine fir, Engelmann spruce, Rocky Mountain Douglas-fir and whitebark pine, are found in scattered groves throughout the park. The whitebark pine is threatened by a fungus known as white pine blister rust and was listed as a threatened species in 2023. Quaking Aspen and willows are the most common species of deciduous trees. The aspen forests have declined significantly since the early 20th century, but scientists at Oregon State University attribute the recent recovery of the aspen to the reintroduction of wolves which has changed the grazing habits of local elk.

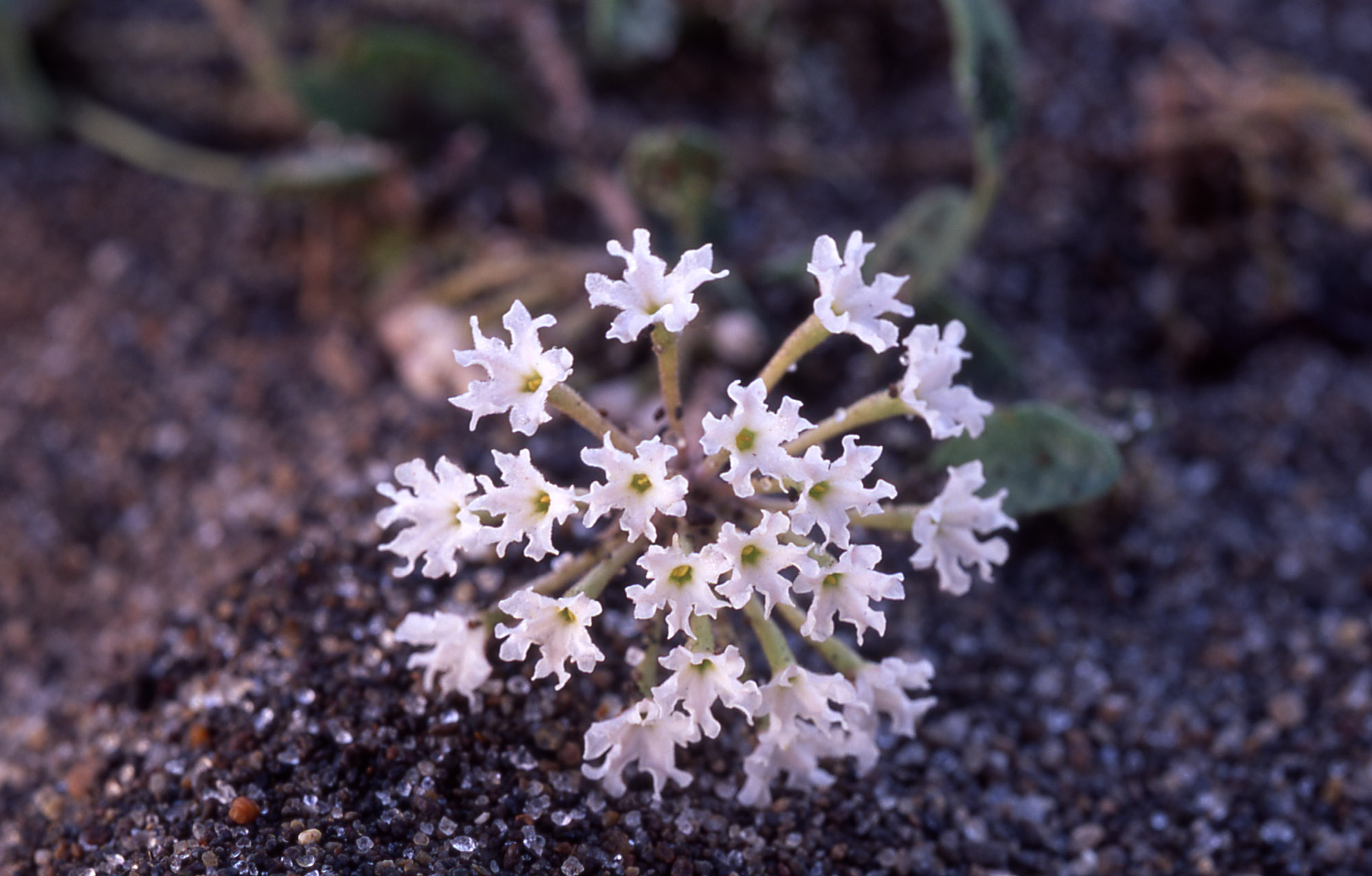
Yellowstone sand verbena is endemic to Yellowstone's lakeshores

There are dozens of species of flowering plants that have been identified, most of which bloom between May and September. The Yellowstone sand verbena is a rare flowering plant found only in Yellowstone. It is closely related to species usually found in much warmer climates, making the sand verbena an enigma. The estimated 8,000 examples of this rare flowering plant all make their home in the sandy soils on the shores of Yellowstone Lake, well above the waterline.

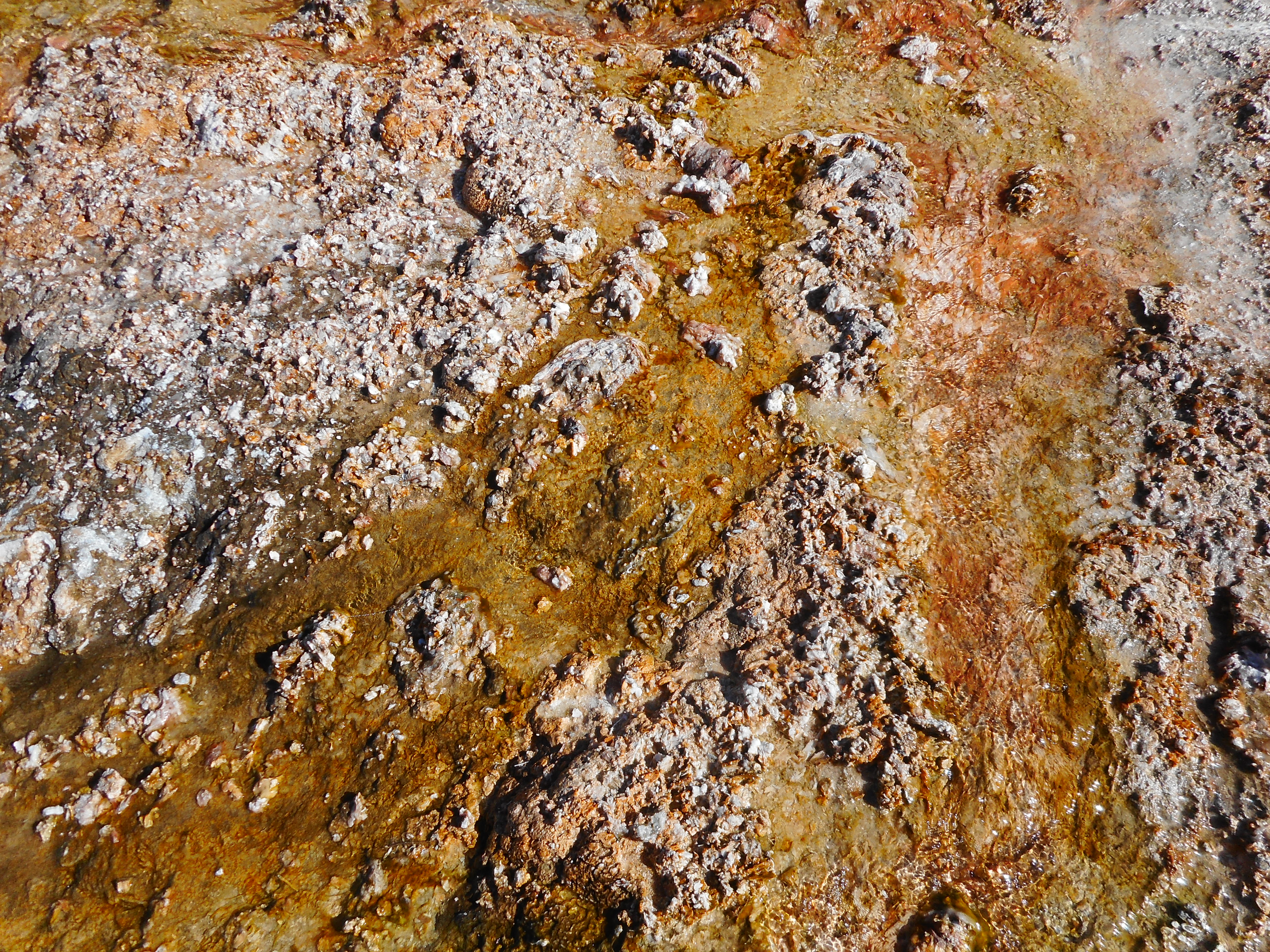
Microbial mat in cooled geyser water, Upper Geyser Basin

In Yellowstone's hot waters, bacteria form mats of bizarre shapes consisting of trillions of organisms. These bacteria are some of the most primitive life forms on earth. Flies and other arthropods live on the mats, even in the middle of the bitterly cold winters. Initially, scientists thought that microbes there gained sustenance only from sulfur.

Thermus aquaticus is a bacterium found in the Yellowstone hot springs that produces an important enzyme (Taq polymerase) that is easily replicated in the lab and is useful in replicating DNA as part of the polymerase chain reaction (PCR) process. The retrieval of these bacteria can be achieved with no impact on the ecosystem. Research into thermophiles at Yellowstone has helped develop tests for viruses and the development of new kinds of biodegradable plastic. In 2016, researchers from Uppsala University reported the discovery of a class of thermophiles, Hadesarchaea, in Yellowstone's Culex Basin. These organisms are capable of converting carbon monoxide and water to carbon dioxide and hydrogen.

Non-native plants sometimes threaten native species by occupying nutrient resources. Though exotic species are most commonly found in areas with the greatest human visitation, such as near roads and at major tourist areas, they have also spread into the backcountry. Generally, most exotic species are controlled by pulling the plants out of the soil or by spraying, both of which are time-consuming and expensive.

=== Fauna ===
Yellowstone is widely considered to be the finest megafauna wildlife habitat in the lower 48 states. There are almost 60 species of mammals in the park, including the Rocky Mountain wolf, coyote, the Canadian lynx, cougars, and black and grizzly bears. Other large mammals include the bison (often referred to as buffalo), elk, moose, mule deer, white-tailed deer, mountain goat, pronghorn, and bighorn sheep.

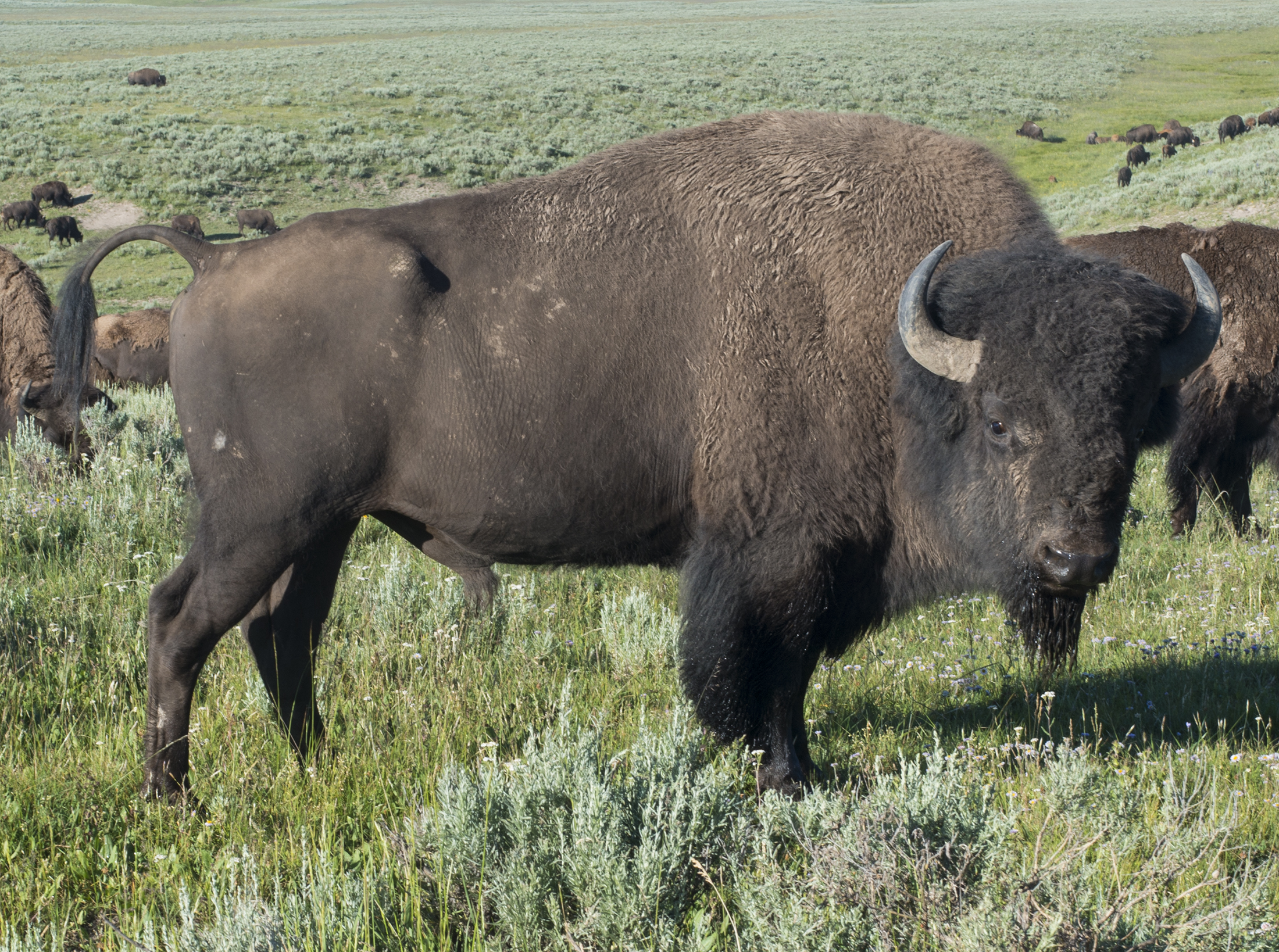
American bison

The Yellowstone bison herd is the largest public herd of American bison in the United States. Bison once numbered between 30 and 60 million individuals throughout North America, and Yellowstone remains one of their last strongholds. Their populations had increased from less than 50 in the park in 1902 to 6,000 individuals in 2023, which necessitated a massive cull of 1,150.

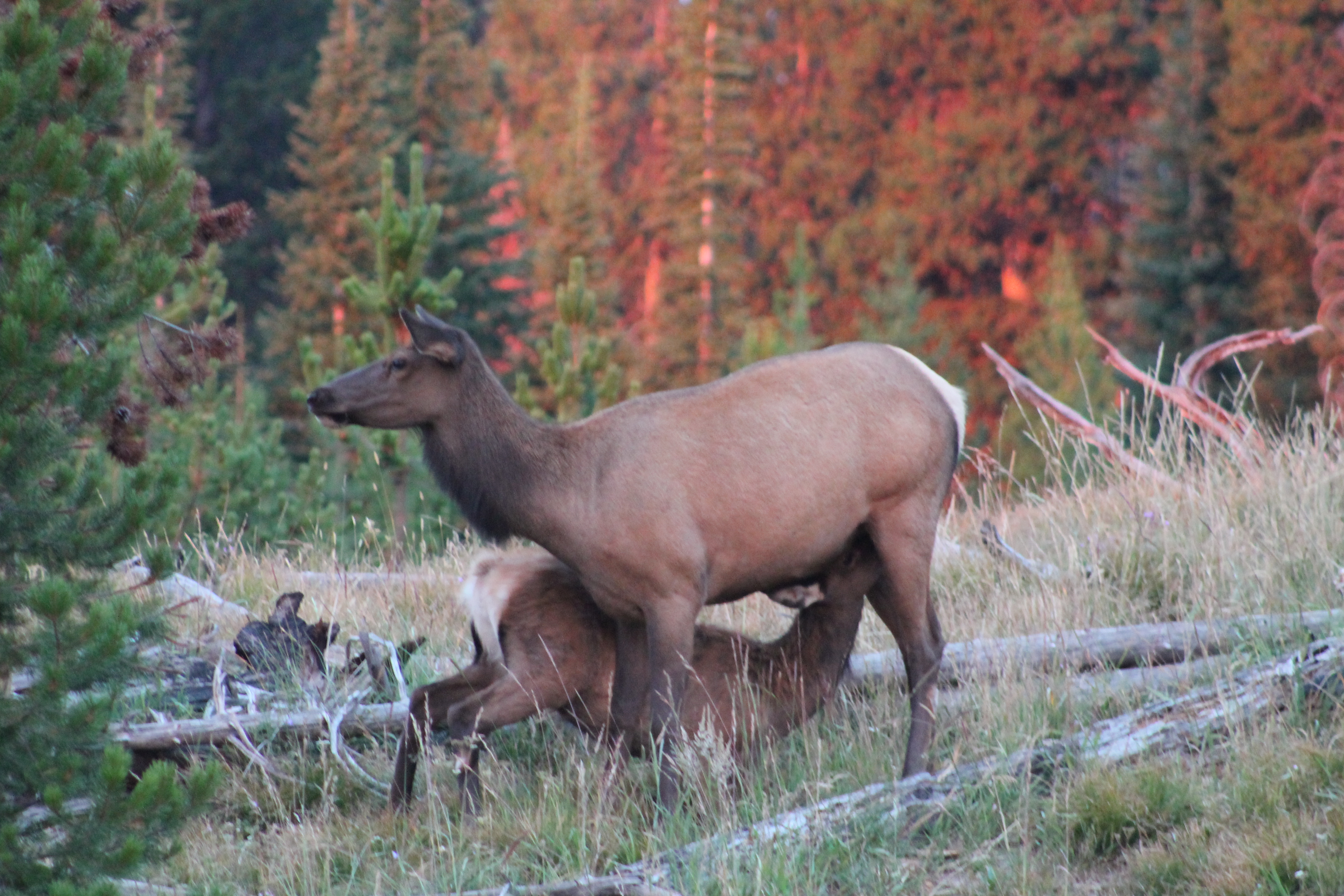
Elk mother nursing her calf

The relatively large bison populations are a concern for ranchers, who fear that the species can transmit bovine diseases to their domesticated cousins. About half of Yellowstone's bison have been exposed to brucellosis, a bacterial disease that came to North America with European cattle that may cause cattle to miscarry. The disease has little effect on park bison, and no reported cases of transmission from wild bison to domestic livestock have been filed. Elk also carry the disease and are believed to have transmitted the infection to horses and cattle.

To combat the perceived threat of brucellosis transmission to cattle, national park personnel regularly corral bison herds back into the park when they venture outside of the area's borders. During the winter of 1996–1997, the bison herd was so large that 1,079 bison that had exited the park were either shot or sent to slaughter. Animal rights activists argue that this is a cruel practice and that the possibility for disease transmission is not as great as some ranchers maintain. Ecologists point out that the bison are merely traveling to seasonal grazing areas that lie within the Greater Yellowstone Ecosystem that have been converted to cattle grazing, some of which are within National Forests and are leased to private ranchers. APHIS has stated that with vaccinations and other means, brucellosis can be eliminated from the bison and elk herds throughout Yellowstone.

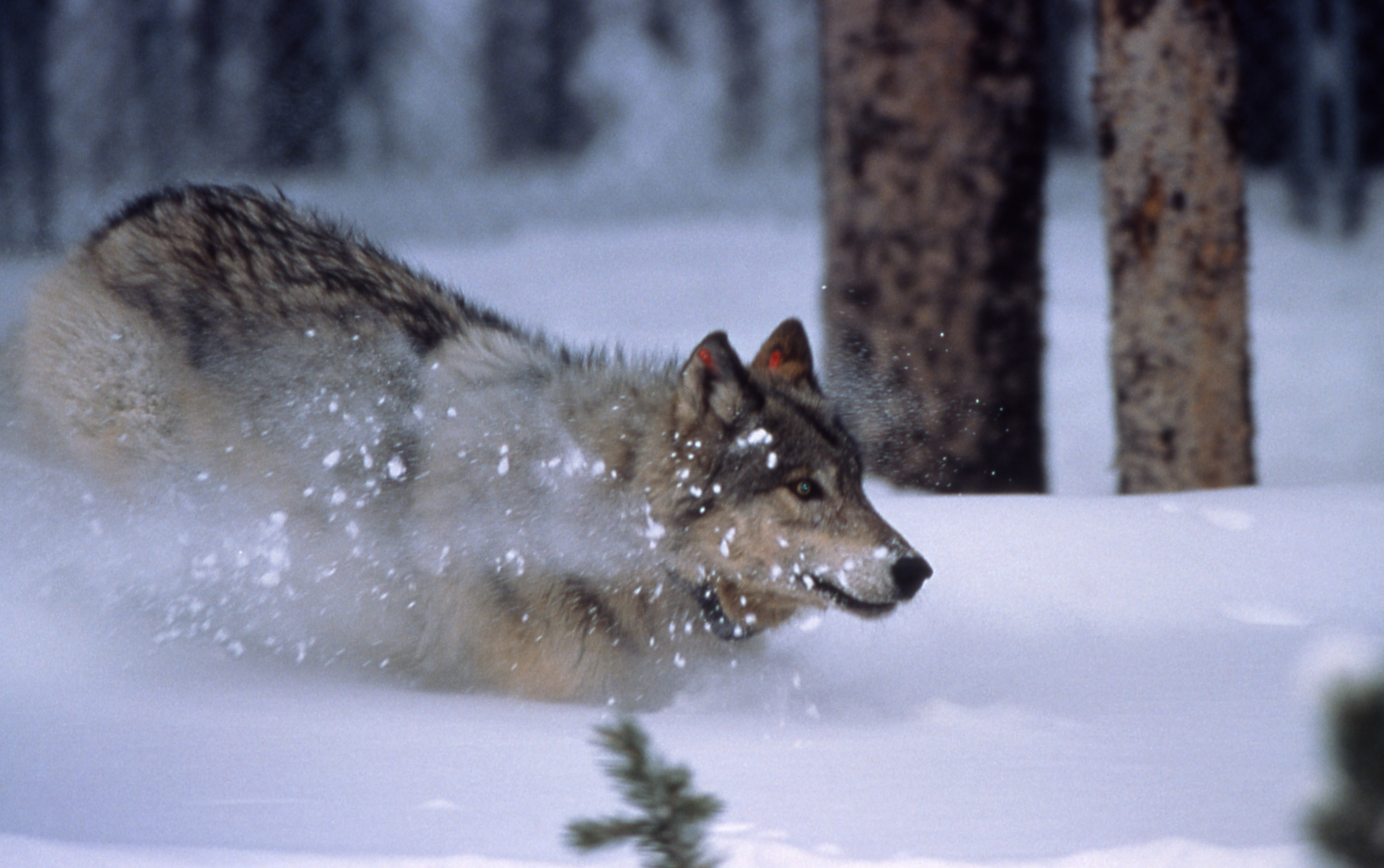
A reintroduced wolf in Yellowstone National Park

Starting in 1914, to protect elk populations, the U.S. Congress appropriated funds to be used for "destroying wolves, prairie dogs, and other animals injurious to agriculture and animal husbandry" on public lands. Park Service hunters carried out these orders, and by 1926 they had killed 136 wolves. Gradually, wolves were virtually eliminated from Yellowstone. Further exterminations continued until the National Park Service ended the practice in 1935. With the passing of the Endangered Species Act in 1973, the wolf was one of the first mammal species listed. After the wolves were extirpated from Yellowstone, the coyote then became the park's top canine predator. Since the coyote is not able to bring down large animals, this lack of an apex predator resulted in a marked increase in lame and sick megafauna.

By the 1990s, the Federal government had reversed its views on wolves. In a controversial decision by the U.S. Fish and Wildlife Service (which oversees threatened and endangered species), northwestern wolves imported from Canada were reintroduced into the park. Reintroduction efforts have been successful, with populations remaining relatively stable. A survey conducted in 2024 reported that there were 9 wolf packs, totaling 108 individuals. The recovery of populations throughout the states of Wyoming, Montana, and Idaho has been so successful that on February 27, 2008, the U.S. Fish and Wildlife Service removed the Northern Rocky Mountain wolf population from the endangered species list. Wolves in Yellowstone sit at the core of a larger population connected throughout the Greater Yellowstone Ecosystem.

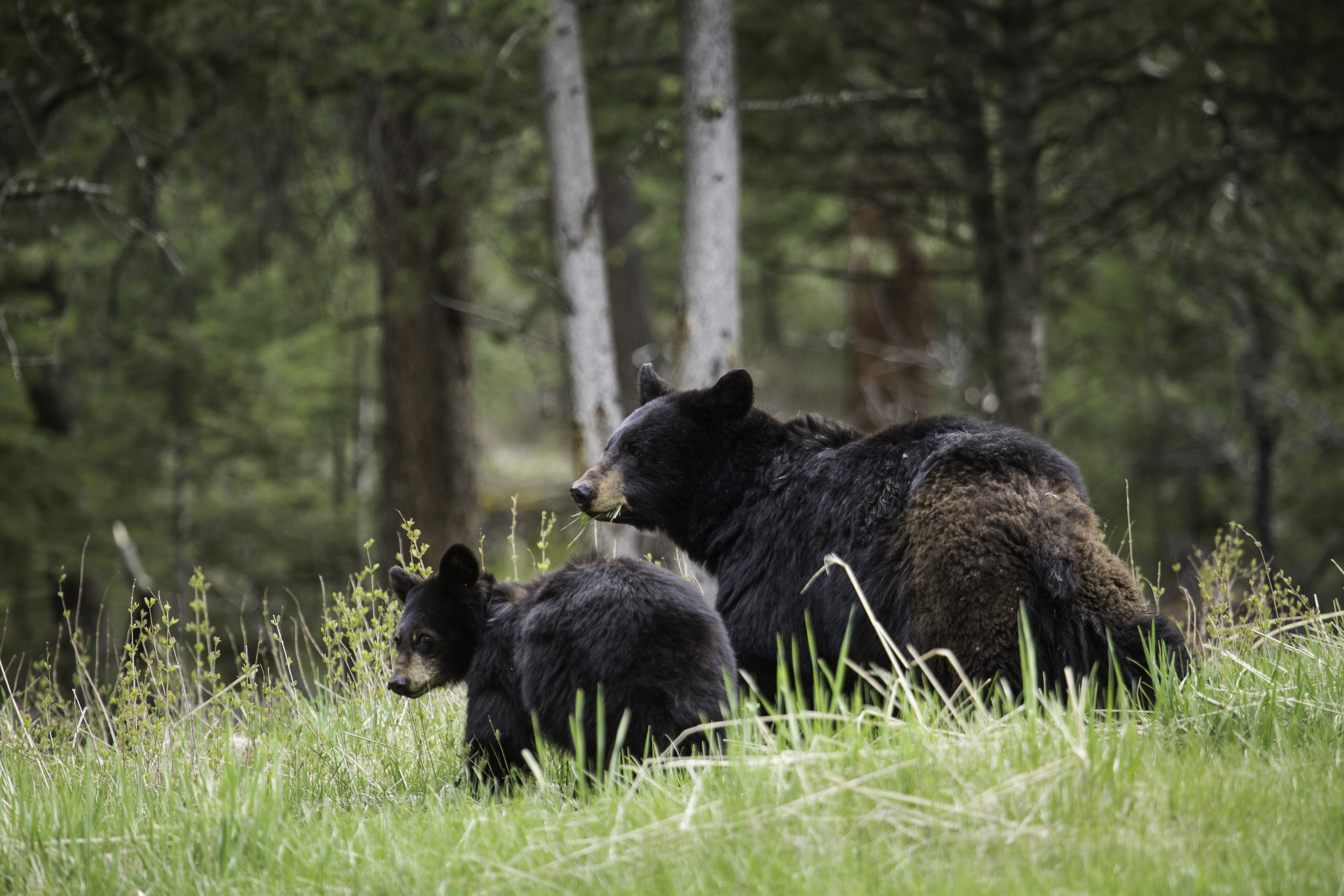
Black bear and cub near Tower Fall

Black bears are common in the park and were a park symbol due to visitor interaction with the bears starting in 1910. Feeding and close contact with bears has not been permitted since the 1960s to reduce their desire for human foods. Yellowstone is one of the few places in the United States where black bears can be seen coexisting with grizzly bears. Black bear observations occur most often in the park's northern ranges, and in the Bechler area which is in the park's southwestern corner.

As of 2017, an estimated 700 grizzly bears were living in the Greater Yellowstone Ecosystem, with about 150 grizzlies living wholly or partially within Yellowstone National Park. The grizzly was initially listed as a threatened species in the contiguous United States on July 28, 1975, by the Fish and Wildlife Service. The grizzly bear was taken off the endangered species list in 2007. Opponents of delisting the grizzly expressed concerns that states might once again allow hunting and that better conservation measures were needed to ensure a sustainable population. A federal district judge overturned the delisting ruling in 2009, reinstating the grizzly. The grizzly was once again removed from the list in 2017. In September 2018, a U.S. district judge ruled that the grizzly's protections must be restored in full, arguing the Fish and Wildlife Service was mistaken in removing the bear from the threatened status list. Hunting is prohibited within Yellowstone National Park while hunters may transport the carcass through the park with a permit.

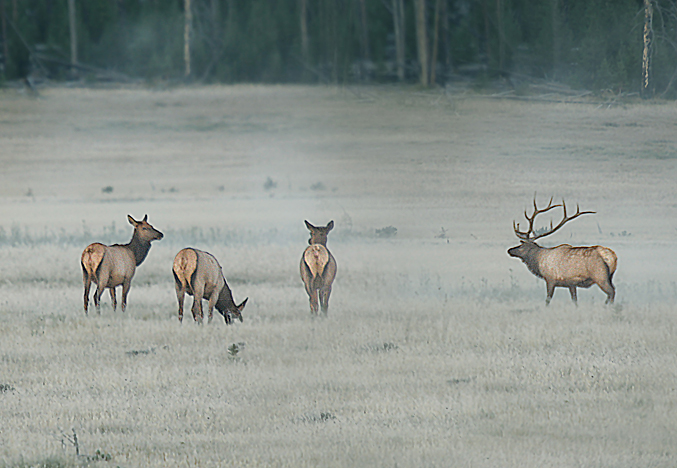
Elk in Hayden Valley

Population figures for elk are more than 30,000—the largest population of any large mammal species in Yellowstone. The northern herd has decreased enormously since the mid‑1990s; this has been attributed to wolf predation and causal effects such as elk using more forested regions to evade predation, consequently making it harder for researchers to accurately count them. The northern herd migrates west into southwestern Montana in the winter. The southern herd migrates southward, and the majority of this elk winter on the National Elk Refuge, immediately southeast of Grand Teton National Park. The southern herd migration is the largest mammalian migration remaining in the U.S. outside of Alaska.

In 2003 the tracks of one female lynx and her cub were spotted and followed for over 2 miles (3.2 km). Fecal material and other evidence obtained were tested and confirmed to be those of a lynx. No visual confirmation was made, however. Lynx have not been seen in Yellowstone since 1998, though DNA taken from hair samples obtained in 2001 confirmed that lynx were at least transient to the park. Other less commonly seen mammals include the cougar and wolverine. The cougar has an estimated population of only 25 individuals park-wide. Accurate population figures for the wolverine are not known. These uncommon and rare mammals provide insight into the health of protected lands such as Yellowstone and help managers make determinations as to how best to preserve habitats.

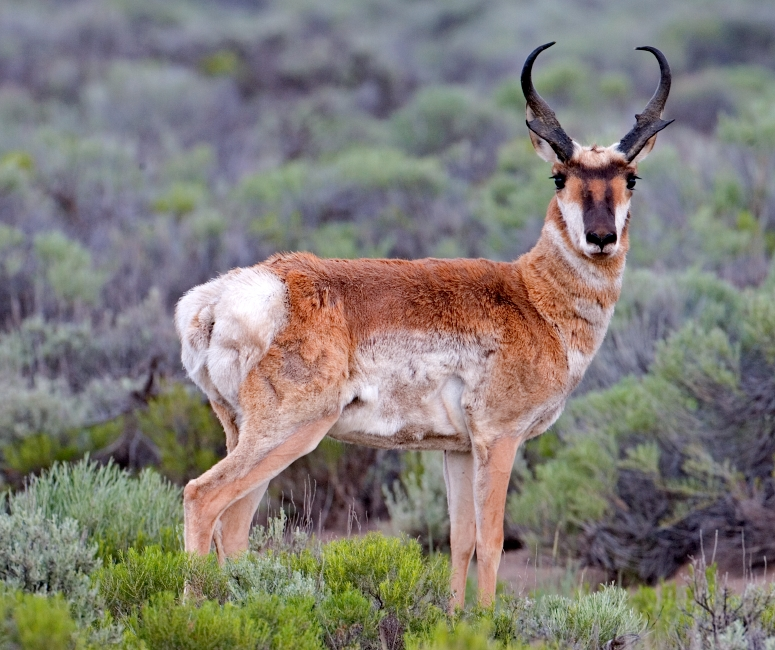
Pronghorn are commonly found on the grasslands in the park

Eighteen species of fish live in Yellowstone, including the core range of the Yellowstone cutthroat trout—a fish highly sought by anglers. The Yellowstone cutthroat trout has faced several threats since the 1980s, including the suspected illegal introduction into Yellowstone Lake of lake trout, an invasive species which consume the smaller cutthroat trout. Although lake trout were established in Shoshone and Lewis lakes (on the Snake River drainage) after U.S. government stocking operations in 1890, it was never officially introduced into the Yellowstone River drainage. The cutthroat trout has also faced an ongoing drought, as well as the accidental introduction of a parasite—whirling disease—which causes a terminal nervous system disease in younger fish. Since 2001, all native sport fish species caught in Yellowstone waterways are subject to catch and release regulations.

Yellowstone is also home to seven species of reptiles: the painted turtle, rubber boa, prairie rattlesnake, bullsnake, sagebrush lizard, valley garter snake and wandering garter snake. Four species of amphibians are present: the boreal chorus frog, tiger salamander, western toad and Columbia spotted frog.

Three hundred eleven species of birds have been reported, almost half of which nest in Yellowstone. In 1999, twenty-six pairs of nesting bald eagle were documented. Extremely rare sightings of whooping cranes have been recorded; however, only three examples of this species are known to live in the Rocky Mountains out of 385 known worldwide. Other birds, considered species of special concern because of their rarity in Yellowstone, include the common loon, harlequin duck, osprey, peregrine falcon and the trumpeter swan.

== Forest fires ==
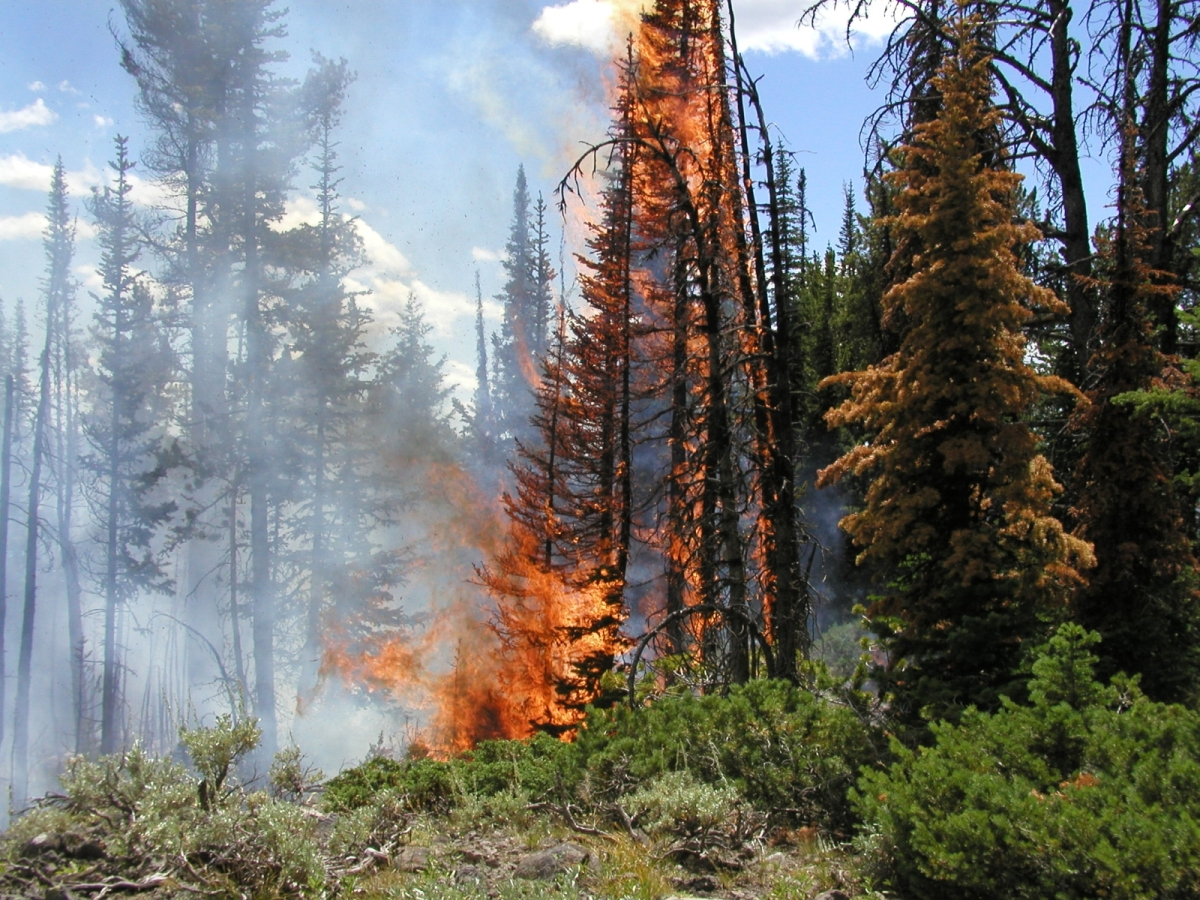
Fire in Yellowstone National Park

As wildfire is a natural part of most ecosystems, plants indigenous to Yellowstone have adapted in a variety of ways. Douglas-fir have a thick bark that protects the inner section of the tree from most fires. Lodgepole pines—the most common tree species in the park—generally have cones that are only opened by the heat of a fire. Their seeds are held in place by a tough resin, and fire assists in melting the resin, allowing the seeds to disperse. Fire clears out dead and downed wood, providing fewer obstacles for lodgepole pines to flourish. Subalpine fir, Engelmann spruce, whitebark pine, and other species tend to grow in colder and moister areas, where the fire is less likely to occur. Aspen trees sprout new growth from their roots, and even if a severe fire kills the tree above ground, the roots often survive unharmed because they are insulated from the heat by soil. The National Park Service estimates that in natural conditions, grasslands in Yellowstone burned an average of every 20 to 25 years, while forests in the park would experience fire about every 300 years.

About thirty-five natural forest fires are ignited each year by lightning, while another six to ten are started by people—in most cases by accident. Yellowstone National Park has three fire lookout towers, each staffed by trained firefighters. The easiest one to reach is atop Mount Washburn, which has interpretive exhibits and an observation deck open to the public. The park also monitors fire from the air and relies on visitor reports of smoke and flames. Fire towers are staffed almost continuously from late June to mid-September—the primary fire season. Fires burn with the greatest intensity in the late afternoon and evening. Few fires burn more than 100 acres (40 ha), and the vast majority of fires reach only a little over an acre (0.5 ha) before they burn themselves out. Fire management focuses on monitoring dead and down wood quantities, soil, and tree moisture, and the weather, to determine those areas most vulnerable to fire should one ignite. The current policy is to suppress all human-caused fires and to evaluate natural fires, examining the benefit or detriment they may pose to the ecosystem. If a fire is considered to be an immediate threat to people and structures, or will burn out of control, then fire suppression is performed.

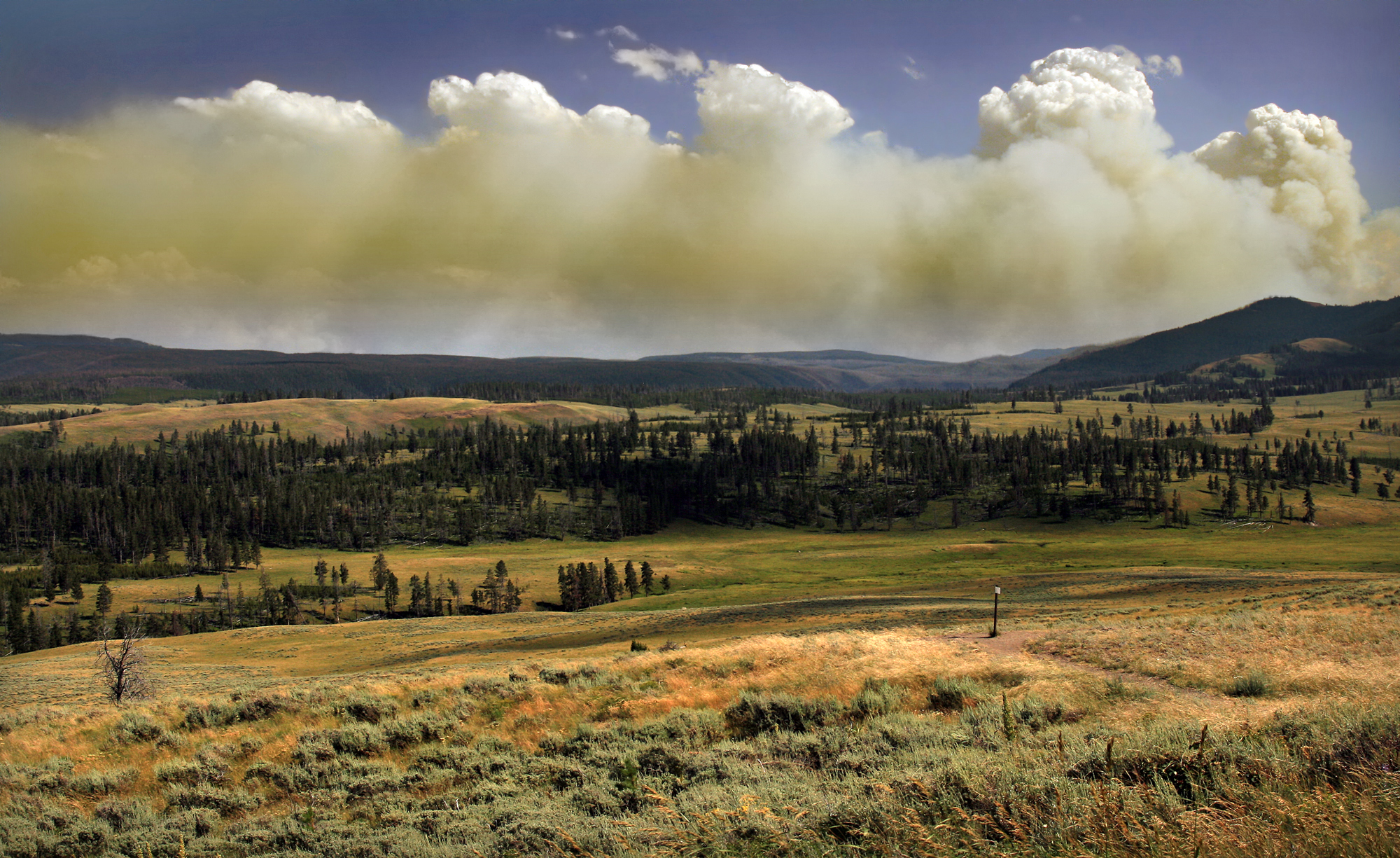
Wildfire in Yellowstone National Park produces a pyrocumulus cloud

To minimize the chances of out-of-control fires and threats to people and structures, park employees do more than just monitor the potential for fire. Controlled burns are prescribed fires that are deliberately started to remove dead timber under conditions that allow firefighters an opportunity to carefully control where and how much wood is consumed. Natural fires are sometimes considered prescribed fires if they are left to burn. In Yellowstone, unlike some other parks, there have been very few fires deliberately started by employees as prescribed burns. However, over the last 30 years, over 300 natural fires have been allowed to burn naturally. In addition, firefighters remove dead and down wood and other hazards from areas where they will be a potential fire threat to lives and property, reducing the chances of fire danger in these areas. Fire monitors also regulate fire through educational services to the public and have been known to temporarily ban campfires from campgrounds during periods of high fire danger. The common notion in early United States land management policies was that all forest fires were bad. The fire was seen as a purely destructive force and there was little understanding that it was an integral part of the ecosystem. Consequently, until the 1970s, when a better understanding of wildfire was developed, all fires were suppressed. This led to an increase in dead and dying forests, which would later provide the fuel load for fires that would be much harder, and in some cases, impossible to control. The latest Fire Management Plan (2014) allows natural fires to burn if they posed no immediate threat to lives and property.

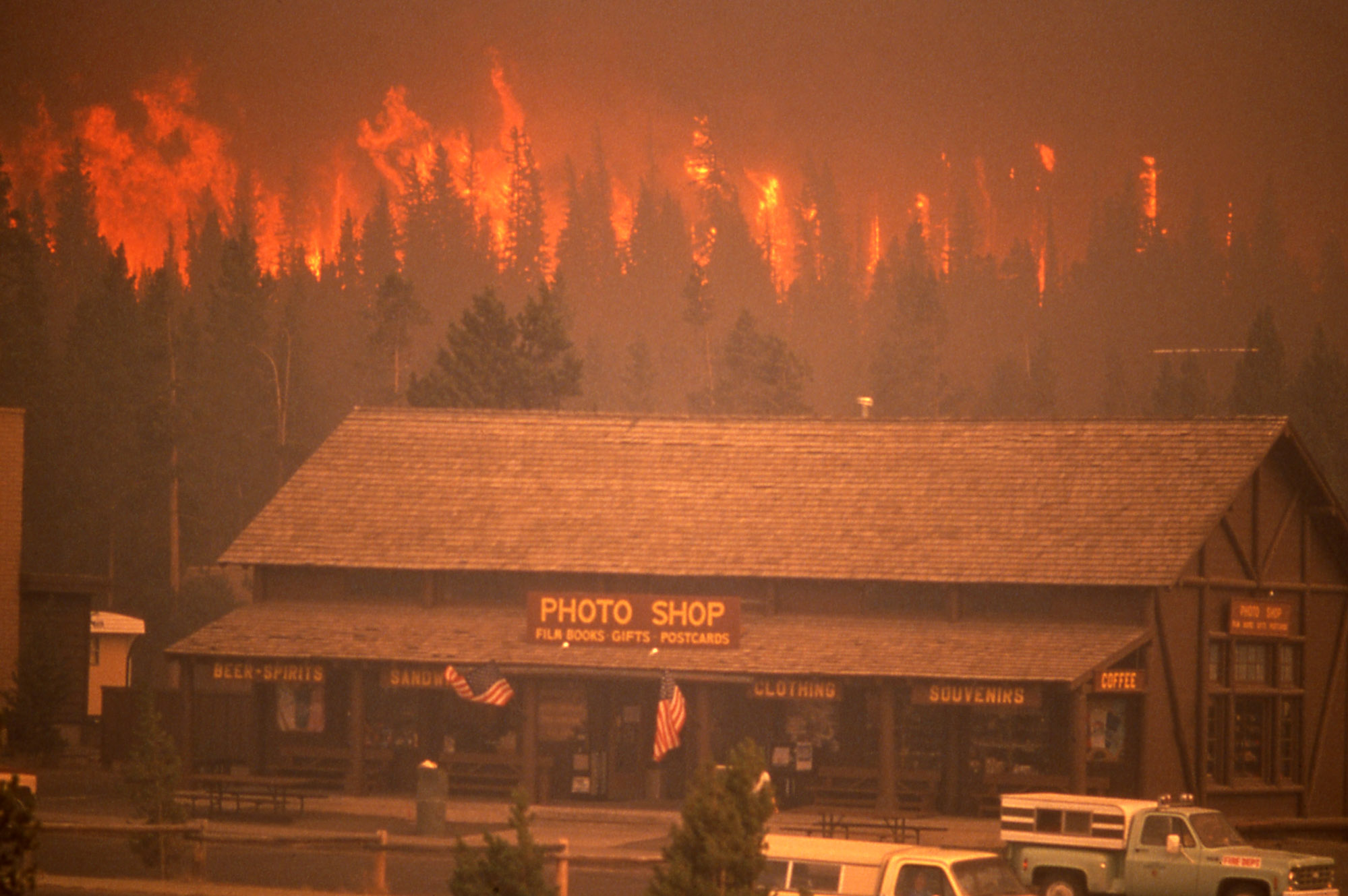
A crown fire approaches the Old Faithful complex on September 7, 1988

The spring season of 1988 was wet, but by summer, drought began moving in throughout the northern Rockies, creating the driest year on record to that point. Grasses and plants which grew well in the early summer from the abundant spring moisture produced plenty of grass, which soon turned to dry tinder. The National Park Service began firefighting efforts to keep the fires under control, but the extreme drought made suppression difficult. Between July 15 and 21, 1988, fires quickly spread from 8,500 acres (3,400 ha; 13.3 sq mi) throughout the entire Yellowstone region, which included areas outside the park, to 99,000 acres (40,000 ha; 155 sq mi) on the park land alone. By the end of the month, the fires were out of control. Large fires burned together, and on August 20, 1988, the single worst day of the fires, more than 150,000 acres (61,000 ha; 230 sq mi) were consumed. Seven large fires were responsible for 95% of the 793,000 acres (321,000 ha; 1,239 sq mi) that were burned over the next couple of months. The cost of 25,000 firefighters and U.S. military forces participating in the suppression efforts was 120 million dollars. By the time winter brought snow that helped extinguish the last flames, the fires had destroyed 67 structures and caused several million dollars in damage. Though no civilians died, two personnel associated with the firefighting efforts were killed.

Contrary to media reports and speculation at the time, the fires killed very few park animals—surveys indicated that only about 345 elk (of an estimated 40,000–50,000), 36 deer, 12 moose, 6 black bears, and 9 bison had perished. Changes in fire management policies were implemented by land management agencies throughout the United States, based on knowledge gained from the 1988 fires and the evaluation of scientists and experts from various fields. By 1992, Yellowstone had adopted a new fire management plan which observed stricter guidelines for the management of natural fires.

== Climate and weather ==
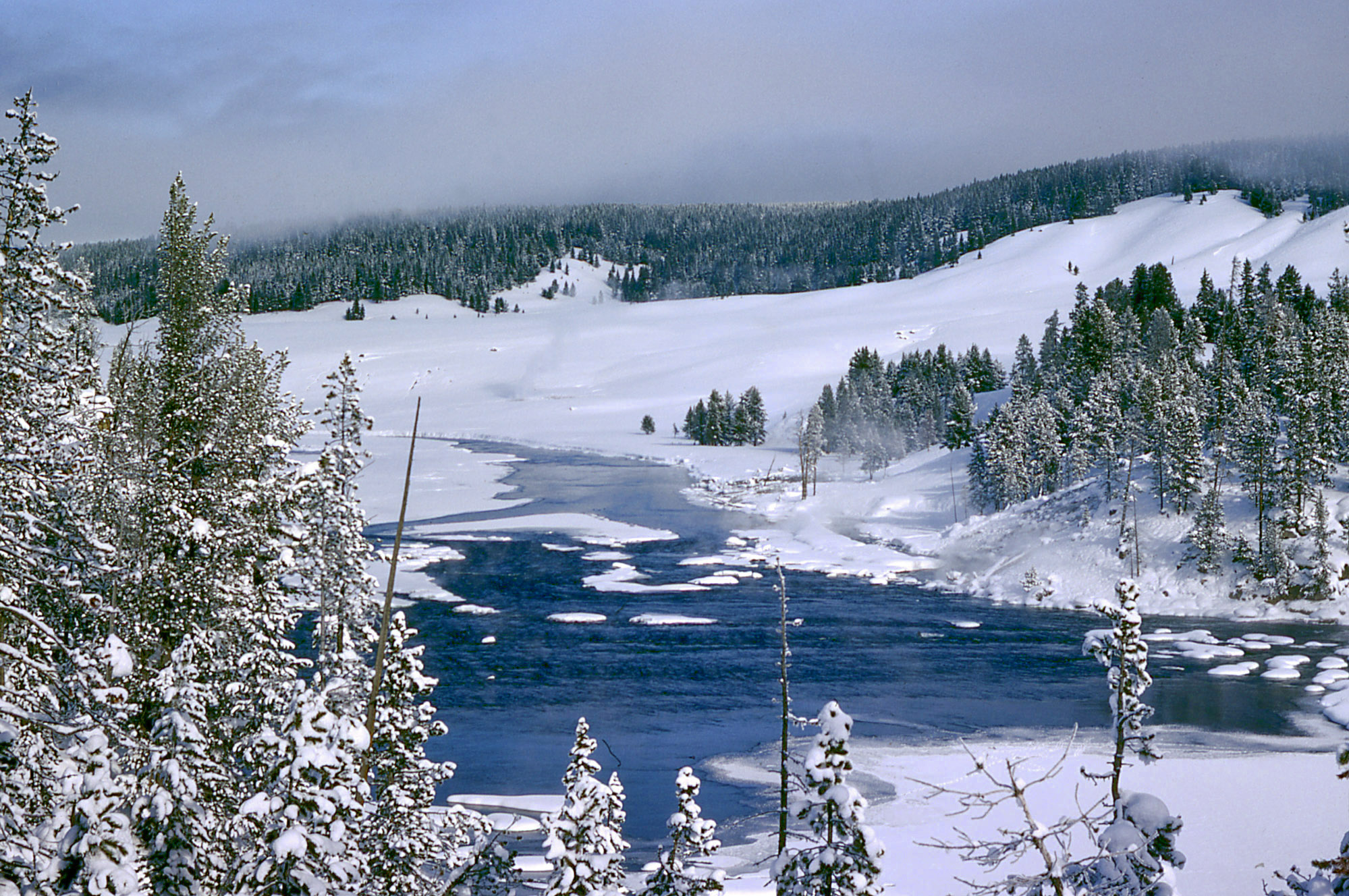
Winter scene in Yellowstone

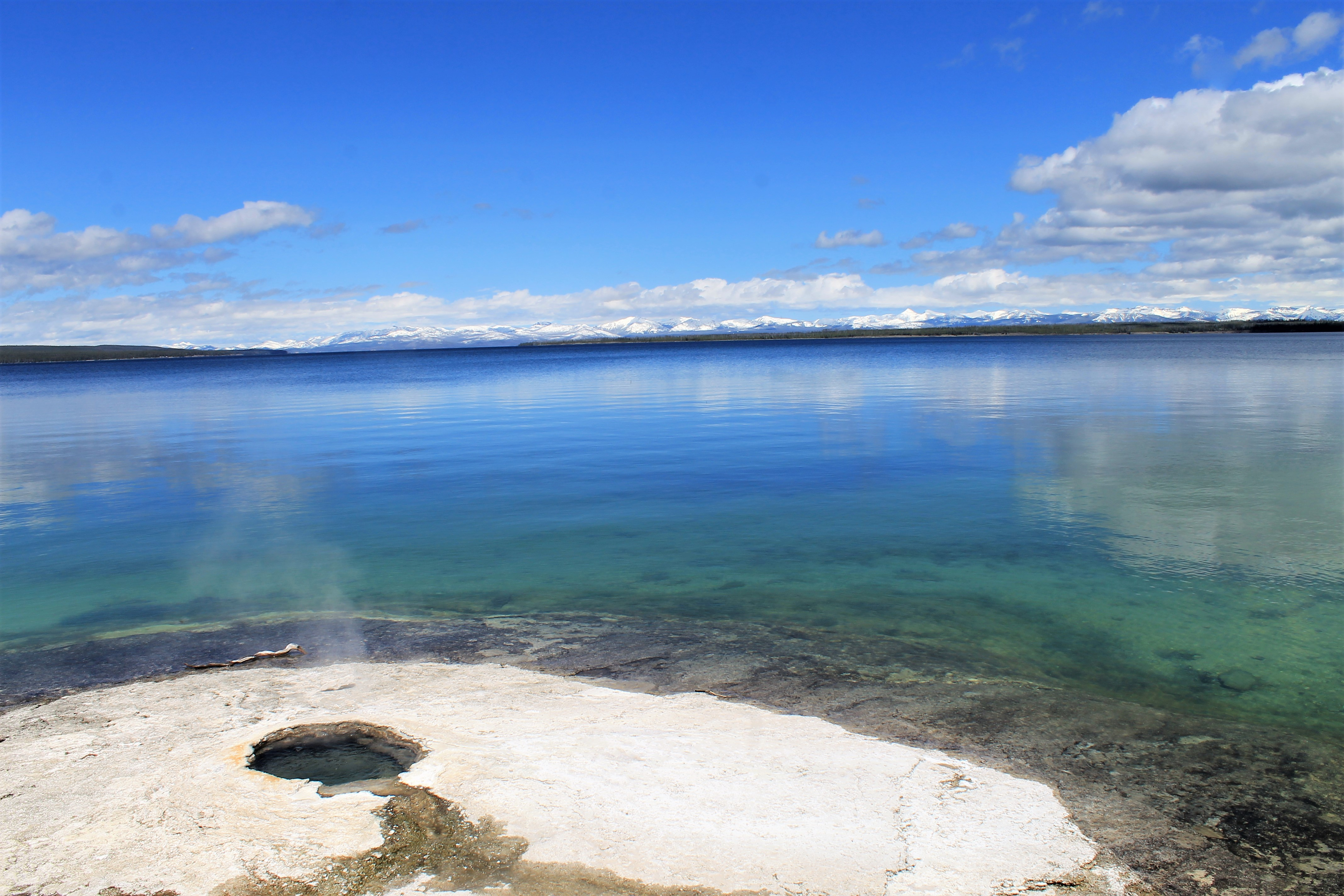
Geyser at Yellowstone Lake

Yellowstone's climate is greatly influenced by altitude, with lower elevations generally found to be warmer year-round. The record high temperature was 99 °F (37 °C) in 2002, while the coldest temperature recorded is −66 °F (−54 °C) in 1933. During the summer months of June to early September, daytime highs are normally in the 70 to 80 °F (21 to 27 °C) range, while nighttime lows can go to below freezing (0 °C), especially at higher altitudes. Summer afternoons are frequently accompanied by thunderstorms. Spring and fall temperatures range between 30 and 60 °F (−1 and 16 °C) with nights in the teens to single digits (−5 to −20 °C). Winter in Yellowstone is accompanied by high temperatures usually between 0 and 20 °F (−18 and −7 °C) and nighttime temperatures below 0 °F (−18 °C) for most of the winter.

Precipitation in Yellowstone is highly variable and ranges from 15 inches (380 mm) annually near Mammoth Hot Springs to 80 inches (2,000 mm) in the southwestern sections of the park. The precipitation of Yellowstone is greatly influenced by the moisture channel formed by the Snake River Plain to the west that was, in turn, formed by Yellowstone itself. Snow is possible in any month of the year, but most common between November and April, with averages of 150 inches (3,800 mm) annually around Yellowstone Lake, to twice that amount at higher elevations.

The climate at Yellowstone Lake is classified as subarctic (Dfc), according to Köppen-Geiger climate classification, while at the park headquarters, the classification is humid continental (Dfb).

Tornadoes in Yellowstone are rare. However, on July 21, 1987, the most powerful tornado recorded in Wyoming touched down in the Teton Wilderness of Bridger-Teton National Forest and hit Yellowstone National Park. Called the Teton–Yellowstone tornado, it was classified as an F4, with wind speeds estimated at between 207 and 260 miles per hour (333 and 418 km/h). The tornado left a path of destruction 1 to 2 miles (1.6 to 3.2 km) wide, and 24 miles (39 km) long, and leveled 15,000 acres (6,100 ha; 23 sq mi) of mature pine forest.

In June 2022, the park closed entrances and evacuated visitors after experiencing record-level rainfall and flooding that caused multiple road and bridge failures, power outages, and mudslides. A combination of heavy rain and rapid snow melt resulted in the Yellowstone River rising to a new record height at 13.88 feet (4.23 m), breaking a previous record of 11.5 feet (3.5 m) set in 1918. Flooding on the Lamar River reached 16.7 feet (5.1 m), beating a 1996 record of 12.15 feet (3.70 m). Damage from the flooding includes washed out roads and bridges, and damage to infrastructure systems including electricity, water and wastewater systems. It was initially forecast that the park would not be able to reopen the north entrance by Gardiner, MT, or the northeast entrance near Cooke City, MT, during the 2022 season. The park partially reopened Wednesday, June 22, after a 9-day closure. The north entrance was opened on October 30, two days ahead of schedule. The northeast entrance was opened on October 15. To limit the nearly one million visitors per month that visit in the summer, the park temporarily restricted entry to cars based on license plates.

Climate data for Yellowstone Lake, 1991–2020 normals, extremes 1904–present
| Month | Jan | Feb | Mar | Apr | May | Jun | Jul | Aug | Sep | Oct | Nov | Dec | Year |
|---|---|---|---|---|---|---|---|---|---|---|---|---|---|
| Record high °F (°C) | 48 (9) | 49 (9) | 60 (16) | 73 (23) | 78 (26) | 84 (29) | 92 (33) | 91 (33) | 89 (32) | 76 (24) | 63 (17) | 52 (11) | 92 (33) |
| Mean maximum °F (°C) | 37.2 (2.9) | 40.7 (4.8) | 49.9 (9.9) | 56.3 (13.5) | 66.6 (19.2) | 75.6 (24.2) | 81.2 (27.3) | 81.1 (27.3) | 76.4 (24.7) | 64.6 (18.1) | 49.0 (9.4) | 37.3 (2.9) | 82.7 (28.2) |
| Mean daily maximum °F (°C) | 23.2 (−4.9) | 26.7 (−2.9) | 35.0 (1.7) | 41.5 (5.3) | 50.4 (10.2) | 60.8 (16.0) | 71.2 (21.8) | 70.9 (21.6) | 61.4 (16.3) | 46.0 (7.8) | 32.6 (0.3) | 23.6 (−4.7) | 45.3 (7.4) |
| Daily mean °F (°C) | 13.3 (−10.4) | 15.1 (−9.4) | 22.9 (−5.1) | 30.4 (−0.9) | 39.7 (4.3) | 48.5 (9.2) | 56.9 (13.8) | 56.2 (13.4) | 47.7 (8.7) | 35.6 (2.0) | 23.7 (−4.6) | 15.4 (−9.2) | 33.8 (1.0) |
| Mean daily minimum °F (°C) | 3.3 (−15.9) | 3.5 (−15.8) | 10.8 (−11.8) | 19.3 (−7.1) | 29.0 (−1.7) | 36.3 (2.4) | 42.7 (5.9) | 41.6 (5.3) | 34.1 (1.2) | 25.2 (−3.8) | 14.8 (−9.6) | 7.2 (−13.8) | 22.3 (−5.4) |
| Mean minimum °F (°C) | −21.2 (−29.6) | −23.2 (−30.7) | −13.4 (−25.2) | −0.6 (−18.1) | 12.2 (−11.0) | 25.0 (−3.9) | 31.7 (−0.2) | 29.4 (−1.4) | 21.5 (−5.8) | 6.8 (−14.0) | −7.1 (−21.7) | −14.6 (−25.9) | −28.1 (−33.4) |
| Record low °F (°C) | −51 (−46) | −56 (−49) | −43 (−42) | −29 (−34) | −10 (−23) | 14 (−10) | 20 (−7) | 13 (−11) | −5 (−21) | −17 (−27) | −30 (−34) | −48 (−44) | −56 (−49) |
| Average precipitation inches (mm) | 1.97 (50) | 1.80 (46) | 1.97 (50) | 2.12 (54) | 2.42 (61) | 2.46 (62) | 1.29 (33) | 1.49 (38) | 1.58 (40) | 1.64 (42) | 1.81 (46) | 1.99 (51) | 22.54 (573) |
| Average snowfall inches (cm) | 35.8 (91) | 30.9 (78) | 25.1 (64) | 22.9 (58) | 6.9 (18) | 1.0 (2.5) | 0.0 (0.0) | 0.0 (0.0) | 1.4 (3.6) | 10.2 (26) | 29.8 (76) | 35.4 (90) | 199.4 (507.1) |
| Average precipitation days (≥ 0.01 in) | 17.2 | 15.1 | 13.9 | 12.3 | 11.3 | 13.4 | 9.9 | 10.4 | 9.7 | 9.2 | 12.3 | 16.5 | 151.2 |
| Average snowy days (≥ 0.1 in) | 16.3 | 14.4 | 12.3 | 10.2 | 4.3 | 0.8 | 0.0 | 0.0 | 0.8 | 5.5 | 11.8 | 15.4 | 91.8 |
Source 1: NOAA
Source 2: National Weather Service

Climate data for Yellowstone National Park – Mammoth, Wyoming, 1991–2020 normals, extremes 1894–present
| Month | Jan | Feb | Mar | Apr | May | Jun | Jul | Aug | Sep | Oct | Nov | Dec | Year |
|---|---|---|---|---|---|---|---|---|---|---|---|---|---|
| Record high °F (°C) | 55 (13) | 56 (13) | 68 (20) | 78 (26) | 86 (30) | 92 (33) | 99 (37) | 97 (36) | 94 (34) | 81 (27) | 66 (19) | 57 (14) | 99 (37) |
| Mean maximum °F (°C) | 44.6 (7.0) | 47.8 (8.8) | 57.1 (13.9) | 68.0 (20.0) | 76.9 (24.9) | 85.2 (29.6) | 91.2 (32.9) | 90.5 (32.5) | 85.4 (29.7) | 73.0 (22.8) | 56.8 (13.8) | 44.8 (7.1) | 92.3 (33.5) |
| Mean daily maximum °F (°C) | 31.4 (−0.3) | 34.2 (1.2) | 41.9 (5.5) | 49.7 (9.8) | 59.6 (15.3) | 69.5 (20.8) | 80.8 (27.1) | 79.8 (26.6) | 68.8 (20.4) | 53.6 (12.0) | 39.4 (4.1) | 30.3 (−0.9) | 53.3 (11.8) |
| Daily mean °F (°C) | 21.7 (−5.7) | 23.3 (−4.8) | 30.5 (−0.8) | 38.0 (3.3) | 47.1 (8.4) | 55.8 (13.2) | 64.6 (18.1) | 63.1 (17.3) | 53.9 (12.2) | 41.3 (5.2) | 29.3 (−1.5) | 21.1 (−6.1) | 40.8 (4.9) |
| Mean daily minimum °F (°C) | 11.9 (−11.2) | 12.3 (−10.9) | 19.1 (−7.2) | 26.3 (−3.2) | 34.6 (1.4) | 42.0 (5.6) | 48.3 (9.1) | 46.5 (8.1) | 39.0 (3.9) | 28.9 (−1.7) | 19.2 (−7.1) | 11.9 (−11.2) | 28.3 (−2.1) |
| Mean minimum °F (°C) | −9.5 (−23.1) | −8.7 (−22.6) | 0.8 (−17.3) | 12.1 (−11.1) | 22.6 (−5.2) | 32.2 (0.1) | 40.0 (4.4) | 36.9 (2.7) | 27.7 (−2.4) | 12.6 (−10.8) | −0.2 (−17.9) | −9.1 (−22.8) | −18.0 (−27.8) |
| Record low °F (°C) | −36 (−38) | −35 (−37) | −24 (−31) | −6 (−21) | 6 (−14) | 20 (−7) | 21 (−6) | 24 (−4) | 0 (−18) | −8 (−22) | −27 (−33) | −35 (−37) | −36 (−38) |
| Average precipitation inches (mm) | 0.91 (23) | 0.79 (20) | 1.09 (28) | 1.40 (36) | 1.82 (46) | 1.86 (47) | 1.27 (32) | 1.05 (27) | 1.21 (31) | 1.34 (34) | 1.15 (29) | 0.91 (23) | 14.80 (376) |
| Average snowfall inches (cm) | 11.5 (29) | 11.5 (29) | 10.9 (28) | 7.8 (20) | 1.7 (4.3) | 0.3 (0.76) | 0.0 (0.0) | 0.0 (0.0) | 0.6 (1.5) | 4.7 (12) | 9.9 (25) | 12.6 (32) | 71.5 (182) |
| Average extreme snow depth inches (cm) | 11.2 (28) | 11.9 (30) | 10.9 (28) | 4.5 (11) | 1.2 (3.0) | 0.3 (0.76) | 0.0 (0.0) | 0.0 (0.0) | 0.5 (1.3) | 2.6 (6.6) | 6.2 (16) | 8.3 (21) | 16.8 (43) |
| Average precipitation days (≥ 0.01 in) | 10.6 | 11.4 | 10.5 | 11.3 | 12.8 | 12.5 | 9.2 | 8.5 | 8.7 | 9.7 | 9.6 | 11.9 | 126.7 |
| Average snowy days (≥ 0.1 in) | 8.7 | 9.4 | 7.0 | 5.5 | 1.2 | 0.1 | 0.0 | 0.0 | 0.3 | 2.8 | 7.5 | 10.2 | 52.7 |
Source: NOAA

Climate data for Yellowstone National Park – Old Faithful, Wyoming, 1991–2020 normals, extremes 1904–present
| Month | Jan | Feb | Mar | Apr | May | Jun | Jul | Aug | Sep | Oct | Nov | Dec | Year |
|---|---|---|---|---|---|---|---|---|---|---|---|---|---|
| Record high °F (°C) | 55 (13) | 62 (17) | 63 (17) | 76 (24) | 82 (28) | 89 (32) | 94 (34) | 98 (37) | 87 (31) | 79 (26) | 63 (17) | 58 (14) | 98 (37) |
| Mean maximum °F (°C) | 42.1 (5.6) | 44.8 (7.1) | 52.4 (11.3) | 60.2 (15.7) | 70.7 (21.5) | 79.8 (26.6) | 85.0 (29.4) | 84.6 (29.2) | 79.4 (26.3) | 67.2 (19.6) | 52.5 (11.4) | 40.7 (4.8) | 86.4 (30.2) |
| Mean daily maximum °F (°C) | 28.3 (−2.1) | 31.1 (−0.5) | 38.7 (3.7) | 45.5 (7.5) | 55.2 (12.9) | 65.1 (18.4) | 75.9 (24.4) | 75.0 (23.9) | 64.8 (18.2) | 49.9 (9.9) | 35.3 (1.8) | 26.5 (−3.1) | 49.3 (9.6) |
| Daily mean °F (°C) | 14.7 (−9.6) | 16.5 (−8.6) | 24.3 (−4.3) | 32.3 (0.2) | 42.0 (5.6) | 49.9 (9.9) | 57.6 (14.2) | 55.9 (13.3) | 47.3 (8.5) | 35.9 (2.2) | 22.6 (−5.2) | 13.7 (−10.2) | 34.4 (1.3) |
| Mean daily minimum °F (°C) | 1.1 (−17.2) | 2.0 (−16.7) | 9.9 (−12.3) | 19.1 (−7.2) | 28.7 (−1.8) | 34.7 (1.5) | 39.2 (4.0) | 36.8 (2.7) | 29.9 (−1.2) | 21.9 (−5.6) | 9.9 (−12.3) | 0.9 (−17.3) | 19.5 (−6.9) |
| Mean minimum °F (°C) | −26.5 (−32.5) | −27.5 (−33.1) | −17.9 (−27.7) | −1.5 (−18.6) | 14.7 (−9.6) | 25.1 (−3.8) | 30.1 (−1.1) | 26.9 (−2.8) | 18.0 (−7.8) | 3.4 (−15.9) | −17.3 (−27.4) | −27.1 (−32.8) | −34.2 (−36.8) |
| Record low °F (°C) | −45 (−43) | −49 (−45) | −41 (−41) | −28 (−33) | 3 (−16) | 16 (−9) | 21 (−6) | 14 (−10) | −2 (−19) | −27 (−33) | −32 (−36) | −47 (−44) | −49 (−45) |
| Average precipitation inches (mm) | 2.08 (53) | 2.13 (54) | 2.24 (57) | 2.40 (61) | 2.68 (68) | 2.42 (61) | 1.25 (32) | 1.43 (36) | 1.70 (43) | 2.30 (58) | 2.22 (56) | 2.78 (71) | 25.63 (650) |
| Average snowfall inches (cm) | 35.6 (90) | 29.9 (76) | 27.1 (69) | 17.1 (43) | 5.4 (14) | 0.6 (1.5) | 0.0 (0.0) | 0.0 (0.0) | 0.9 (2.3) | 9.0 (23) | 26.4 (67) | 45.0 (114) | 197.0 (500) |
| Average extreme snow depth inches (cm) | 34.6 (88) | 38.8 (99) | 40.1 (102) | 28.7 (73) | 7.2 (18) | 0.1 (0.25) | 0.0 (0.0) | 0.0 (0.0) | 0.5 (1.3) | 4.5 (11) | 12.9 (33) | 27.3 (69) | 43.3 (110) |
| Average precipitation days (≥ 0.01 in) | 14.1 | 13.0 | 12.2 | 11.9 | 12.7 | 13.2 | 9.0 | 8.9 | 9.5 | 10.1 | 12.0 | 15.2 | 141.8 |
| Average snowy days (≥ 0.1 in) | 13.8 | 12.5 | 11.3 | 8.6 | 2.4 | 0.5 | 0.0 | 0.0 | 0.6 | 4.1 | 10.7 | 15.4 | 79.9 |
Source 1: NOAA
Source 2: National Weather Service

== Cultural impact and heritage ==
Pictorial map by Heinrich C. Berann (1991); scale exaggerated

The expansive cultural history of the park has been documented by the 1,000 archeological sites that have been discovered. The park has 1,106 historic structures and features, and of these Obsidian Cliff and five buildings have been designated National Historic Landmarks. Yellowstone was designated an International Biosphere Reserve on October 26, 1976, and a United Nations World Heritage Site on September 8, 1978. The park was placed on the List of World Heritage in Danger from 1995 to 2003 due to the effects of tourism, infection of wildlife, and issues with invasive species. In 2010, Yellowstone National Park was honored with its own quarter under the America the Beautiful Quarters Program.

The Yellowstone paintings of Thomas Moran and other artists of the Hudson River school shaped late 1800s American landscape painting, and its patriotic interpretations. The innovative architecture of Robert Reamer’s 1903 Old Faithful Inn, which was designated a National Historic Landmark in 1987, kicked off the architectural style known as Parkitecture, or National Park Service Rustic. The cartoon character Yogi Bear, with his home in “Jellystone National Park,” was clearly based on bears in Yellowstone, although Yogi’s creators had little first-hand experience. The 1988 Yellowstone wildfires, which received nationwide media attention, were arguably a signal event for the climate crisis, a preview of the fire-heavy American West in a hotter, drier climate. However, the culture’s focus on impacts to Yellowstone itself, rather than the forest-fire form of those impacts, blunted the climate-change narrative. The Yellowstone TV series is set outside park boundaries. But as with Yogi Bear, its creators rely on public perceptions of Yellowstone to build its fictional world.

The Heritage and Research Center is located at Gardiner, Montana, near the north entrance to the park. The center is home to the Yellowstone National Park's museum collection, archives, research library, historian, archeology lab, and herbarium. The Yellowstone National Park Archives maintain collections of historical records of Yellowstone and the National Park Service. The collection includes the administrative records of Yellowstone, as well as resource management records, records from major projects, and donated manuscripts and personal papers. The archives are affiliated with the National Archives and Records Administration.

== Recreation ==
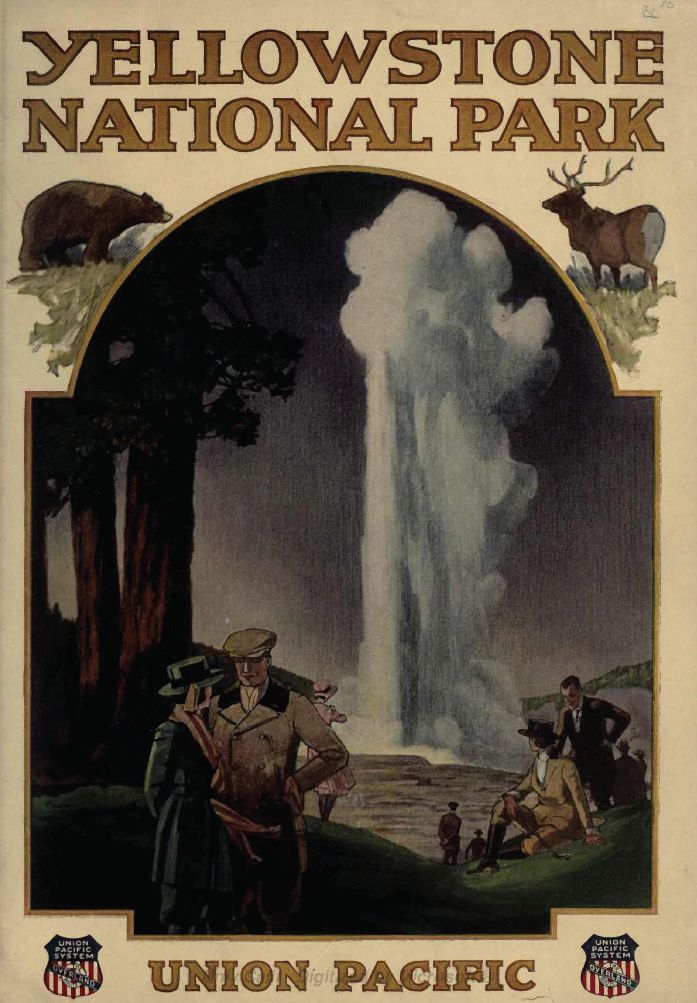
Union Pacific Railroad brochure promoting travel to the park (1921)

Yellowstone ranks among the most popular national parks in the United States. Since the mid-1960s, at least 2 million tourists have visited the park almost every year. Average annual visitation increased to 3.5 million during the ten years from 2007 to 2016, with a record of 4,257,177 recreational visitors in 2016. This number was surpassed in 2023 with 4.5 million people visiting the park. July is the busiest month. At peak summer levels, 3,700 employees work for Yellowstone National Park concessionaires. Concessionaires manage nine hotels and lodges, with a total of 2,238 hotel rooms and cabins available. They also oversee gas stations, stores, and most of the campgrounds. Another 800 employees work either permanently or seasonally for the National Park Service.

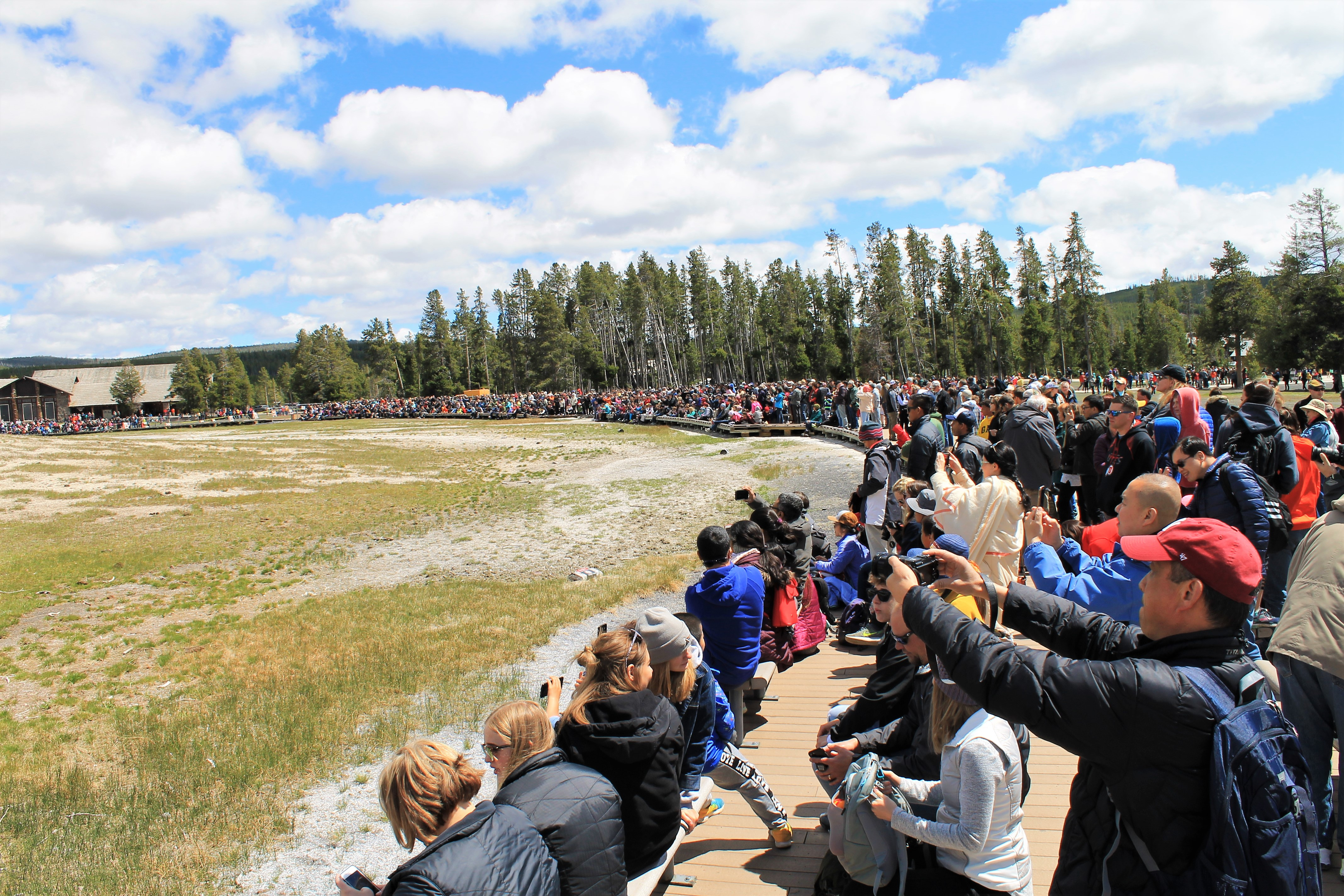
Tourists watch Old Faithful erupt, 2019

Park service roads lead to major features; however, road reconstruction has produced temporary road closures. Yellowstone is in the midst of a long-term road reconstruction effort, which is hampered by a short repair season. In the winter, all roads aside from the one which enters from Gardiner, Montana, and extends to Cooke City, Montana, are closed to wheeled vehicles. Park roads are closed to wheeled vehicles from early November to mid-April, but some park roads remain closed until mid-May. The park has 310 miles (500 km) of paved roads accessible from five different entrances. There is no public transportation available inside the park, but several tour companies can be contacted for guided (including self-guided) motorized transport. In the winter, concessionaires operate guided snowmobile and snow coach tours, though their numbers and access are based on quotas established by the National Park Service. Facilities in the Old Faithful, Canyon and Mammoth Hot Springs areas of the park are very busy during the summer months. Traffic jams created by road construction or by people observing wildlife can result in long delays.

Yellowstone National Park provides a range of recreational opportunities, but they also come with inherent risks. From 2007 to 2023, a total of 74 deaths were recorded within the park. Driving is the leading cause of fatalities, accounting for over 45%, often occurring on roads and highways that traverse Yellowstone's challenging terrain. Water-related activities, including fishing, swimming, and boating on Yellowstone Lake and the park’s rivers and streams, contribute to 17% of fatalities. Hiking, climbing, and walking make up 38%, with incidents frequently occurring on the trails of Yellowstone National Park or near Yellowstone's geothermal areas.

The National Park Service maintains nine visitor centers and museums and is responsible for the maintenance of historical structures and many of the other 2,000 buildings. These structures include National Historical Landmarks, such as the Old Faithful Inn built from 1903 to 1904 and the entire Fort Yellowstone – Mammoth Hot Springs Historic District. Camping is available at a dozen campgrounds with more than 2,000 campsites. Backcountry campsites are accessible only by foot or by horseback and require a permit. There are 1,100 miles (1,800 km) of hiking trails available. Around thermal features, wooden and paved trails have been constructed to ensure visitor safety, and most of these areas are handicapped accessible. The National Park Service maintains a year-round clinic at Mammoth Hot Springs and provides emergency services throughout the year.

Hunting is not permitted, though it is allowed in the surrounding national forests during the open season. Fishing is a popular activity, and a Yellowstone Park fishing license is required to fish in park waters. Many park waters are fly fishing only and all native fish species are catch and release only. Boating is prohibited on rivers and creeks except for a 5 miles (8.0 km) stretch of the Lewis River between Lewis and Shoshone lakes, and it is open to non-motorized use only. Yellowstone Lake has a marina at Bridge Bay while there is a boat ramp at the Lewis lake campground.

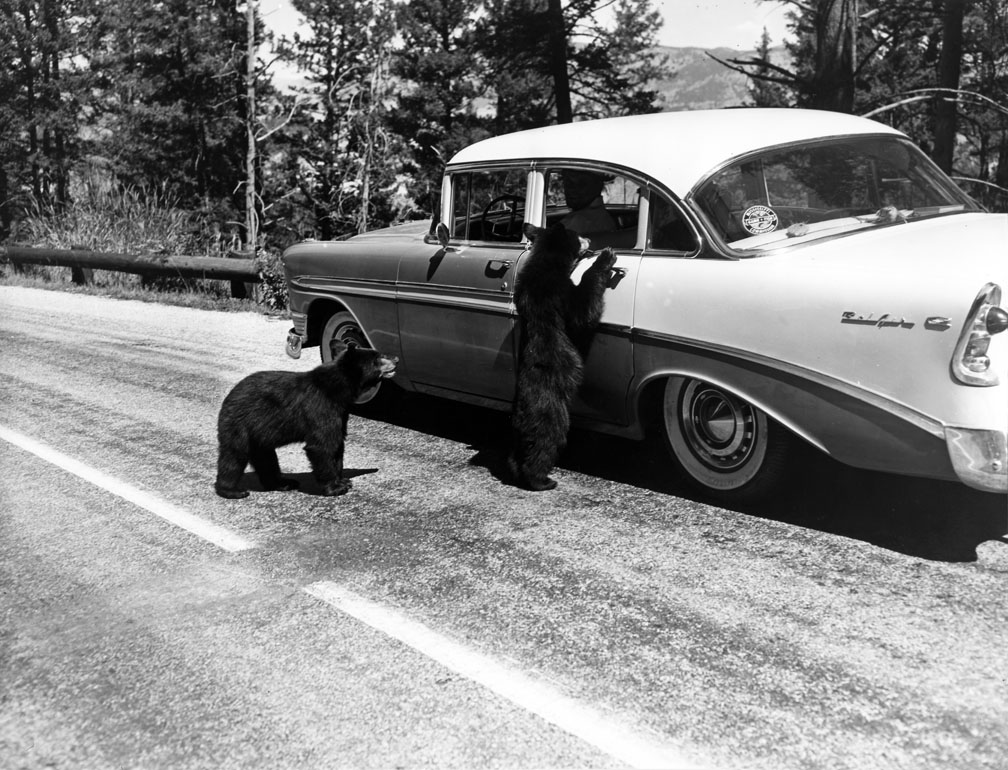
1958 photo of human-habituated bears seeking food from visitors

Other protected lands in the region include Caribou-Targhee, Gallatin, Custer, Shoshone and Bridger-Teton National Forests. The National Park Service's John D. Rockefeller, Jr. Memorial Parkway is to the south and leads to Grand Teton National Park. The famed Beartooth Highway provides access from the northeast and has spectacular high-altitude scenery. Nearby communities include West Yellowstone, Montana; Cody, Wyoming; Red Lodge, Montana; Ashton, Idaho; and Gardiner, Montana. The closest air transport is available by way of Bozeman, Montana; Billings, Montana; Jackson, Wyoming; Cody, Wyoming, or Idaho Falls, Idaho. Salt Lake City, 320 miles (510 km) to the south, is the closest large metropolitan area.

== See also ==
- Bibliography of Yellowstone National Park
- List of national parks of the United States
- National Parks in Idaho
- Outline of Yellowstone National Park
- List of deaths in Yellowstone National Park
- Zone of Death (Yellowstone)
