= Spasm Geyser =

Geyser in the Lower Geyser Basin of Yellowstone National Park

- Interactive map of Spasm Geyser
- Location: Lower Geyser Basin, Yellowstone National Park, Teton County, Wyoming
- Coordinates: 44.551041°N 110.808642°W
- Type: Geyser
- Eruption height: 3 feet (0.91 m)
- Frequency: Hours
- Duration: Minutes to Hours

Spasm Geyser is a geyser in the Lower Geyser Basin of Yellowstone National Park in the United States.

Spasm Geyser is part of the Fountain Group. It is located near the walkway past Fountain Geyser, in front of Clepsydra Geyser, and to the right of Jelly Geyser.

It is connected to Fountain Geyser, ceasing play during Fountain's eruption.
