= Beryl Spring =

Hot spring in the Gibbon Geyser Basin of Yellowstone National Park

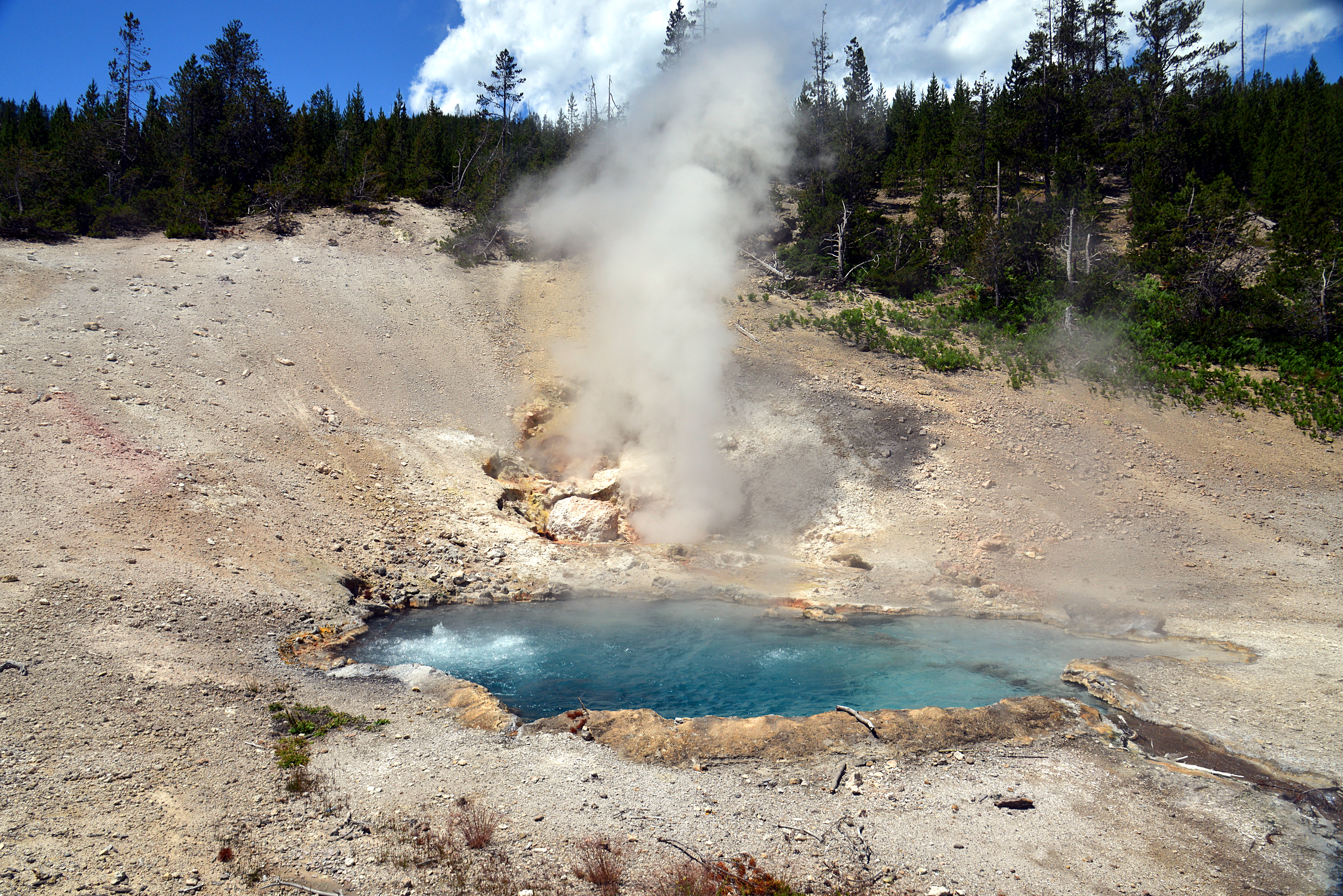
- Beryl Spring
- Interactive map of Beryl Spring
- Location: Gibbon Geyser Basin, Yellowstone National Park, Park County, Wyoming
- Coordinates: 44°40′45″N 110°44′49″W
- Elevation: 7,398 feet (2,255 m)
- Type: Hot spring
- Eruption height: 1–4 ft (0.30–1.22 m)
- Frequency: Near constant
- Duration: Near constant
- Temperature: 83.3 °C (181.9 °F)

Beryl Spring is a hot spring in the Gibbon Geyser Basin of Yellowstone National Park in the United States. It is a large superheated pool, and boils up to a height of 4 feet.

One of the hottest springs in Yellowstone, averaging 196 °F (91 °C)., Beryl Spring was named by the U.S. Geological Survey Hague party in 1883 for the blue-green color which reminded a party member of the gemstone beryl.

Images of Beryl Spring
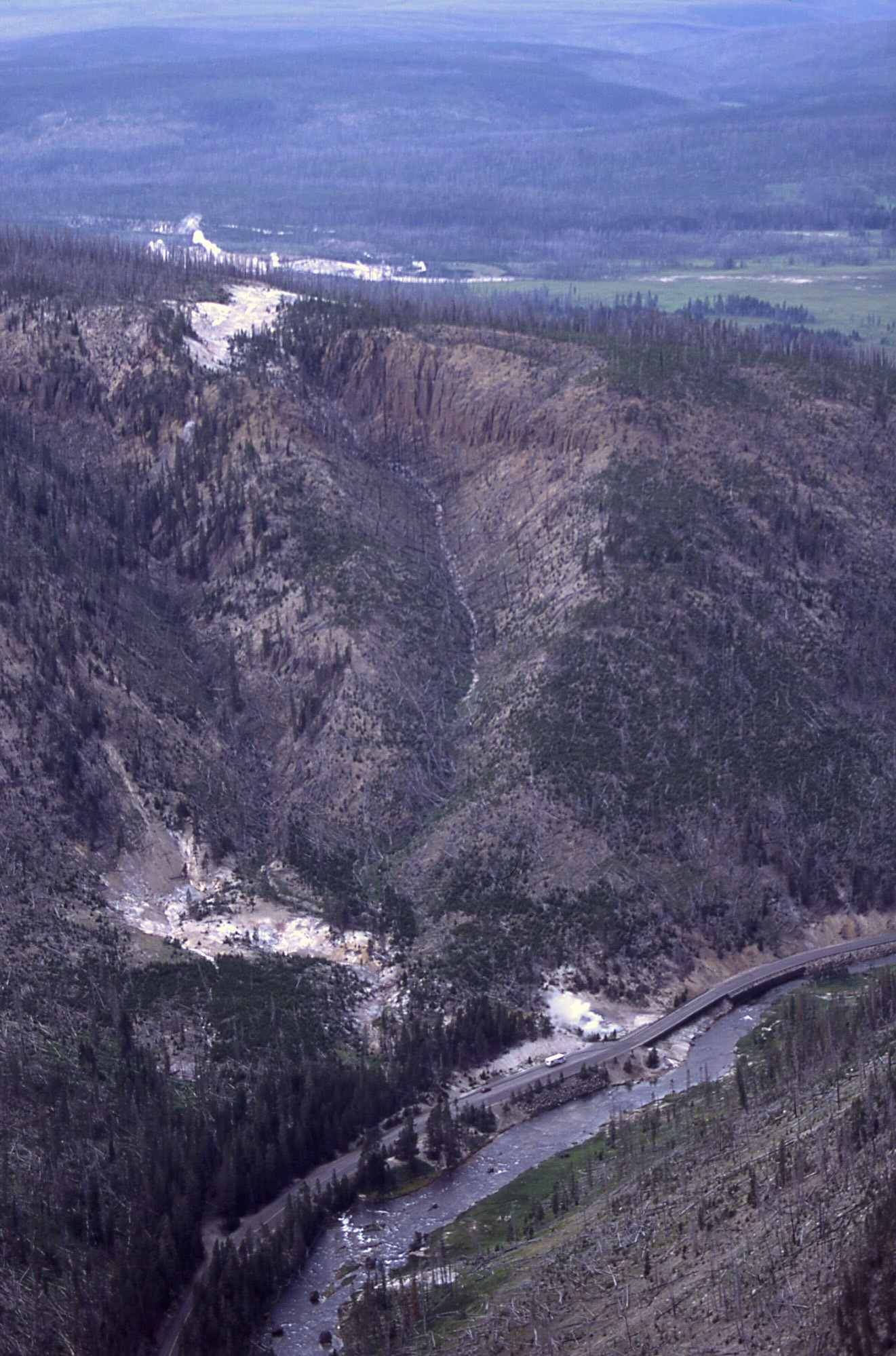
Aerial view of Beryl Spring, 2001

Beryl spring bubbling, July 2019
