= Fishing Cone =

Geyser in Yellowstone National Park

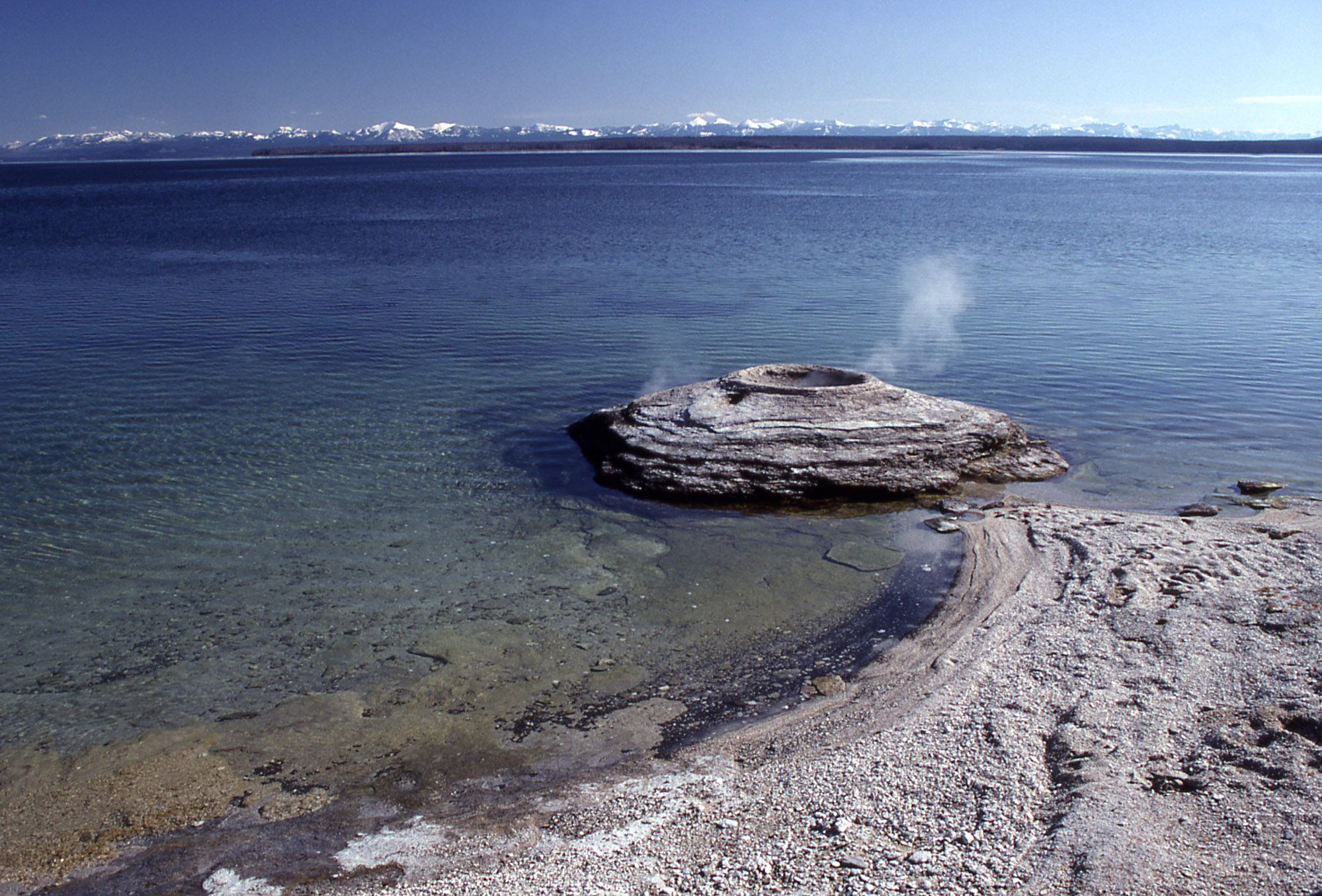
- Fishing Cone

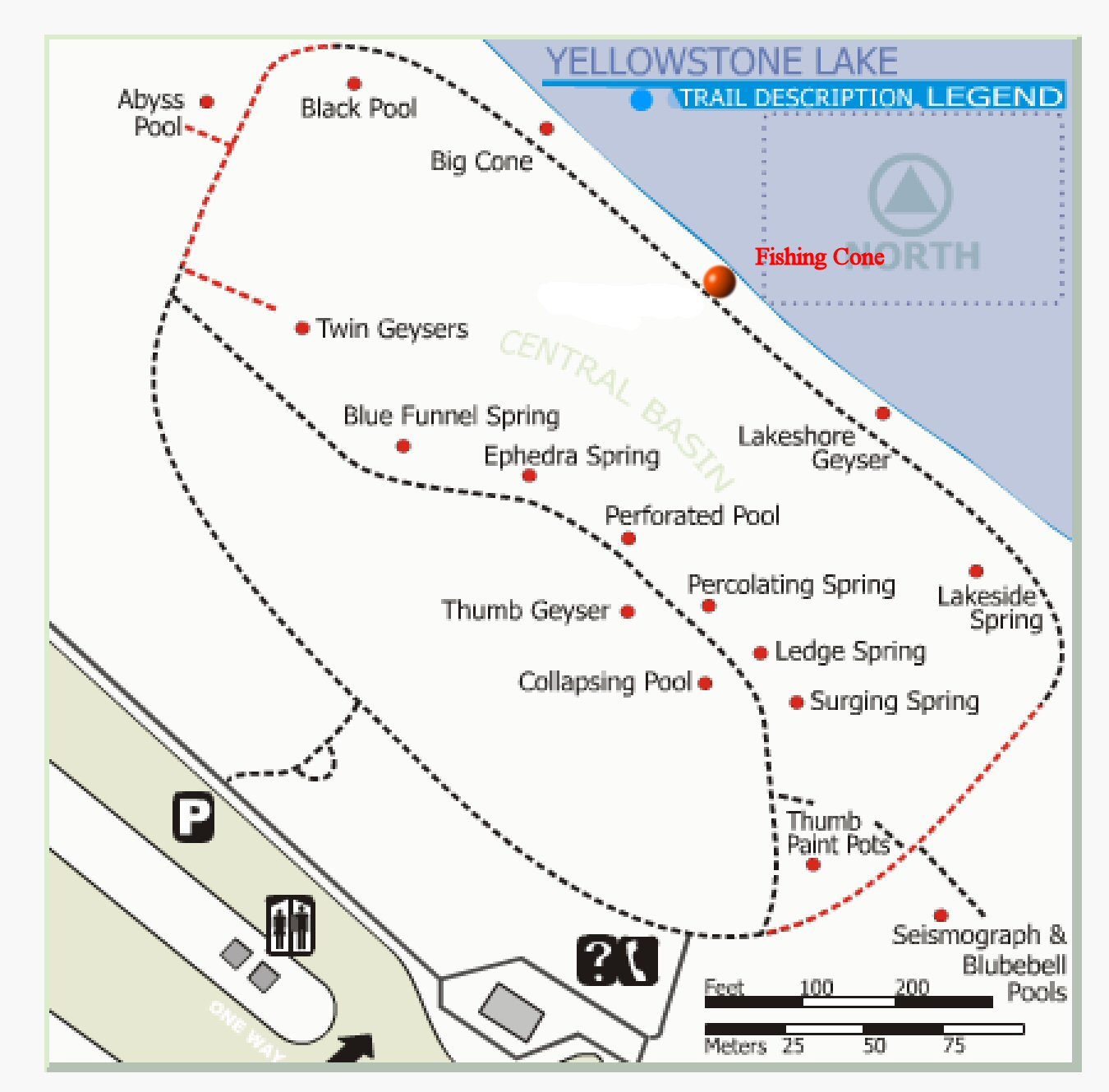
- West Thumb Geyser Basin
- Location: West Thumb Geyser Basin, Yellowstone Lake, Yellowstone National Park, Teton County, Wyoming
- Coordinates: 44°25′02″N 110°34′13″W
- Elevation: 7,736 feet (2,358 m)
- Type: Cone geyser
- Eruption height: 40 feet (12 m)

Fishing Cone, also known as Fishing Pot Hot Springs, is a geyser in the West Thumb Geyser Basin of Yellowstone National Park in Wyoming - America.

In the earlier part of the 20th century, this cone had eruptions as high as 40 feet (12 m). As the water level in Yellowstone Lake has increased, the cone is now inundated during the spring and the temperatures in the cone have cooled enough that it no longer erupts and is now considered a hot spring.

== History ==
The name Fishing Cone can be traced back to tales told by mountain men of a lake where one could catch a fish, immediately dunk it into the hot spring, and cook it on the hook. A member of the 1870 Washburn-Langford-Doane Expedition popularized this feat.

William Trumbell, a member of the Washburn party, wrote about the fishing cone in his account of the expedition:

Several springs were in solid rock, within a few feet of the lake-shore. Some of them extended far out underneath the lake; with which, however, they had no connection. The lake water was quite cold, and that of these springs exceedingly hot. They were remarkably clear, and the eye could penetrate a hundred feet into their depths, which to the human vision appeared bottomless. A gentleman was fishing from one of the narrow isthmuses, or shelves of rock, which divided one of these hot springs from the lake, when, in swinging a trout ashore, it accidentally got off the hook and fell into the spring. For a moment it darted about with wonderful rapidity, as if seeking an outlet. Then it came to the top, dead, and literally boiled. It died within a minute of the time it fell into the spring

— William Trumbell, 1881.

In Henry Winser's The Yellowstone National Park - A Manual for Tourists (1883) he described using hot springs to cook trout:

Trout Fishing Extraordinary.-It has often heen said that it is possible to catch trout in the Yellowstone Lake and cook them in a boiling spring close behind the angler, without taking them off the hook. The assertion seems incredible and it is generally doubted. But this extraordinary feat may certainly be accomplished, not only at the Yellowstone Lake, but also on the Gardiner River, below the Mammoth Hot Springs. The writer performed it at the latter place, in the presence of nine witnesses, at a point not far from a deserted cabin at the foot of the long series of terraces. Selecting a likely pool of the ice-cold stream, with a boiling spring fifteen feet distant from the bank, he stood upon a projecting rock and made a cast. His flies soon tempted a trout to his doom. The fish was small enough to be lifted out of the water without the aid of a landing net, and it was quite easy to drop him into the bubbling hot spring behind. His life must have been extinguished instantly. This procedure was repeated several times, and each of the spectators who had purposely assembled to test the truth of the strange assertion, partook of the fish thus caught and boiled. It required from three to five minutes to thoroughly cook the victims of the experiment, and it was the general verdict that they only needed a little salt to make them quite palatable. This is a "fish story," without doubt, but a perfectly true one. A feat so extraordinary could nowhere else be practiced. It must be chronicled as one or the marvels of the National Park. There are several other places in this land of wonders besides those named where this fishing extraordinary could be successfully attempted.

— Henry Winser, A Manual for Tourists, 1883

A ban on boiling live fish in the spring was announced in November 1911 and became effective in the beginning of 1912 following animal welfare concerns. Park visitors are now prohibited from fishing off the cone and cooking the fish in the boiling water altogether.

== See also ==
- List of hot springs in the United States
- List of hot springs in the world
