= Echinus Geyser =

Geyser in Yellowstone National Park

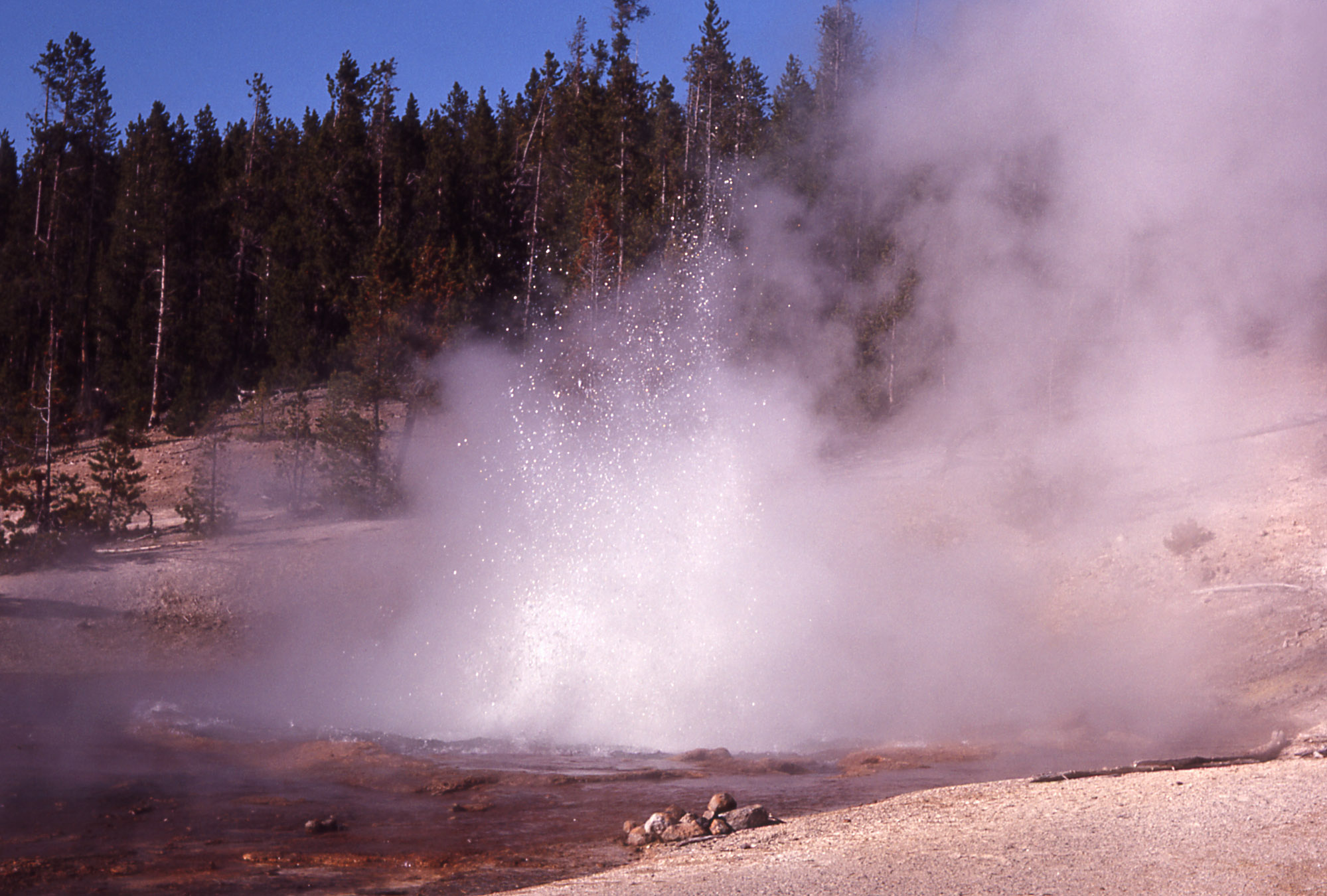
- Echinus Geyser during an eruption

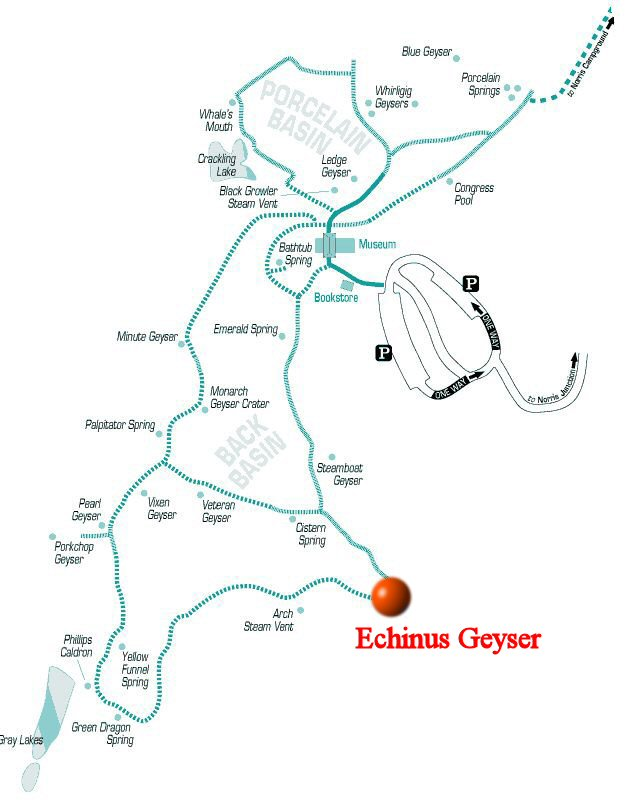
- Norris Geyser Basin
- Location: Norris Geyser Basin, Yellowstone National Park, Park County, Wyoming
- Coordinates: 44°43′21″N 110°42′05″W
- Elevation: 7,575 feet (2,309 m)
- Type: Fountain geyser
- Eruption height: 40 to 60 feet (12 to 18 m)
- Frequency: rare
- Duration: 4 minutes
- Temperature: 80.3 °C (176.5 °F)

Echinus Geyser is a geyser in the Norris Geyser Basin of Yellowstone National Park in the United States.

== History ==
Echinus was named during one of the U.S. Geological Surveys of the park in the late 1870s or early 1880s. The name Echinus comes from the spiny appearance of the cone that resembles a Sea urchin or class Echinoidea.

== Eruption ==
Echinus' eruptions are unpredictable. Its fountain reaches a height of as much as 40 to 60 feet (12 to 18 m), with a duration of about 4 minutes. Prior to 1998, this geyser was very regular, every 35 to 75 minutes. There were also major eruptions that lasted as much as 118 minutes. It is speculated that there was a secondary underground water source that used to power the major eruptions and that the connection to the source was severed leading to Echinus' current state.

In October 2017, Echinus Geyser began to show signs of growing activity, with possible eruptions every 2–3 hours. In January 2018, Echinus' last eruption was recorded of this active phase. One recorded eruption occurred in January 2019.

Echinus is the largest acid-water geyser in the world. Its waters have a pH of 3.3 to 3.6, nearly as acidic as vinegar. The water temperature is 80.3 °C (176.5 °F).

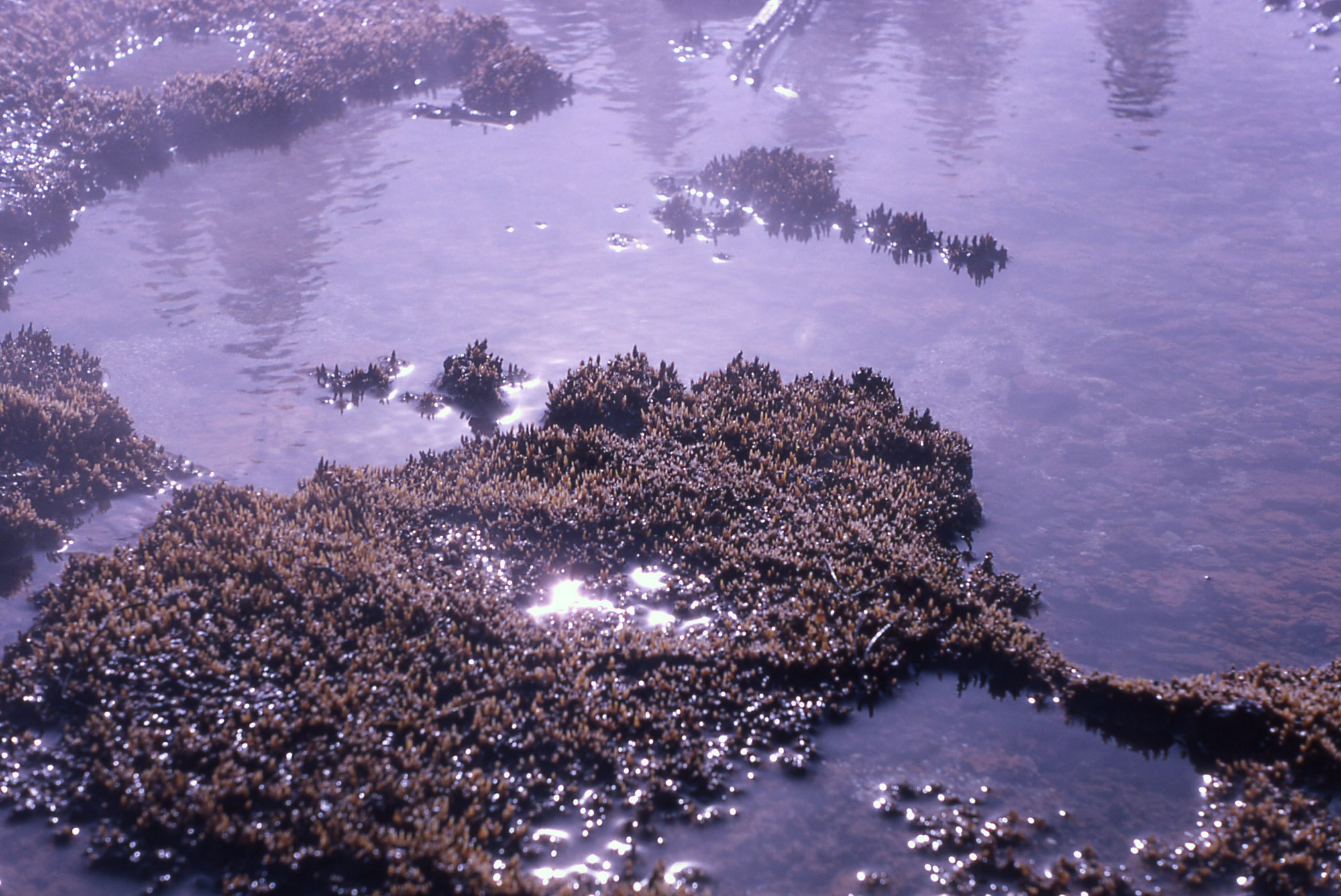
Echinus Geyser Pool, 1965

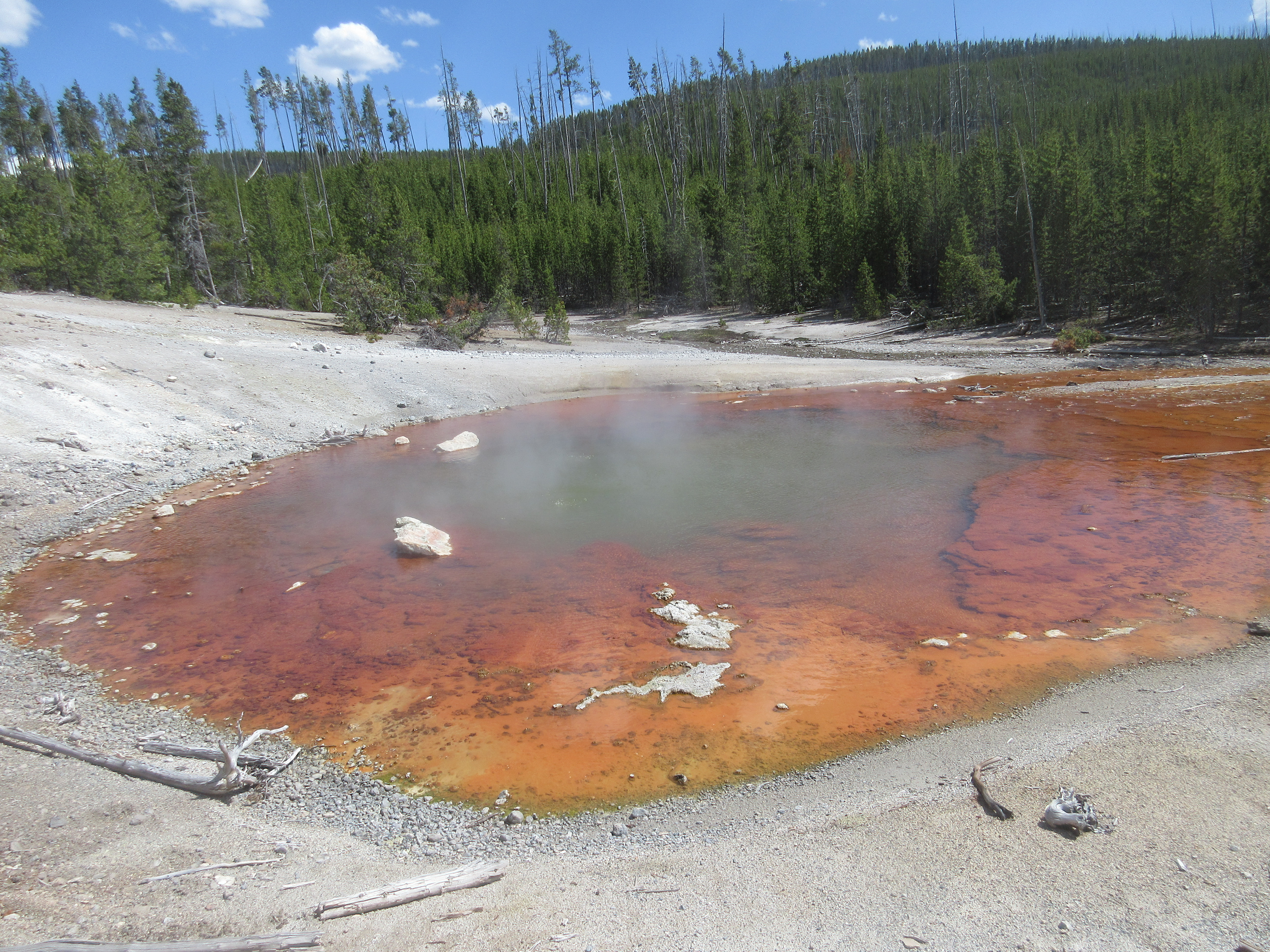
Echinus on June 9, 2018
