= Blue Star Spring =

Hot spring in Yellowstone National Park, US

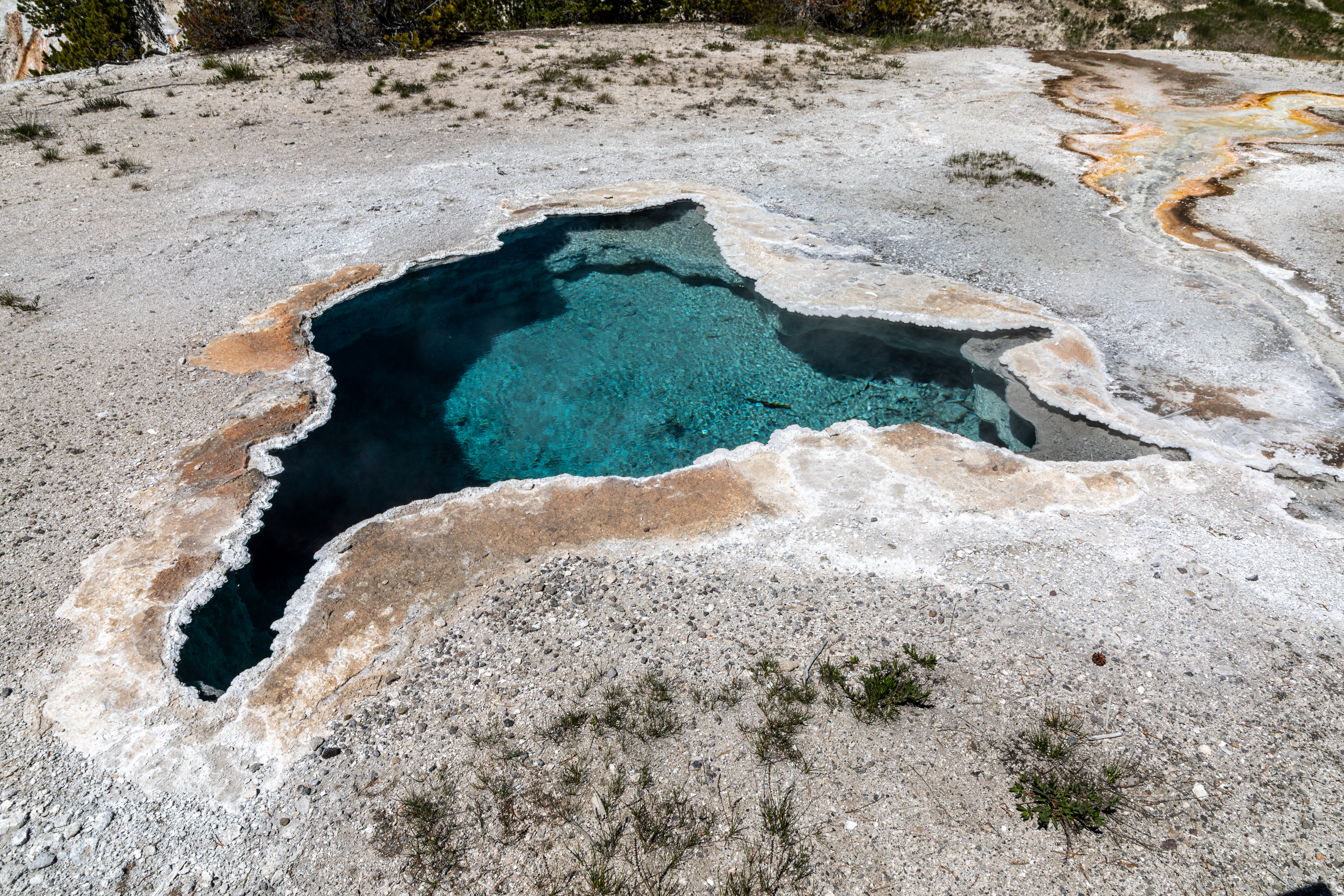
- Interactive map of Blue Star Spring
- Location: Upper Geyser Basin, Yellowstone National Park, Teton County, Wyoming
- Coordinates: 44°27′43″N 110°49′43″W
- Type: Hot spring pool
- Temperature: 190.7 °F (88.2 °C)

Blue Star Spring is a hot spring in the Upper Geyser Basin of Yellowstone National Park in the United States. It is named for its distinctive star shape. The spring has very rarely exhibited geyser activity with the last eruption in 2002. The remains of a bison calf lay at the bottom of the pool after it fell down. The average temperature of the pool is 190.7 °F (88.2 °C).
