= Clepsydra Geyser =

Geyser in the Lower Geyser Basin of Yellowstone National Park

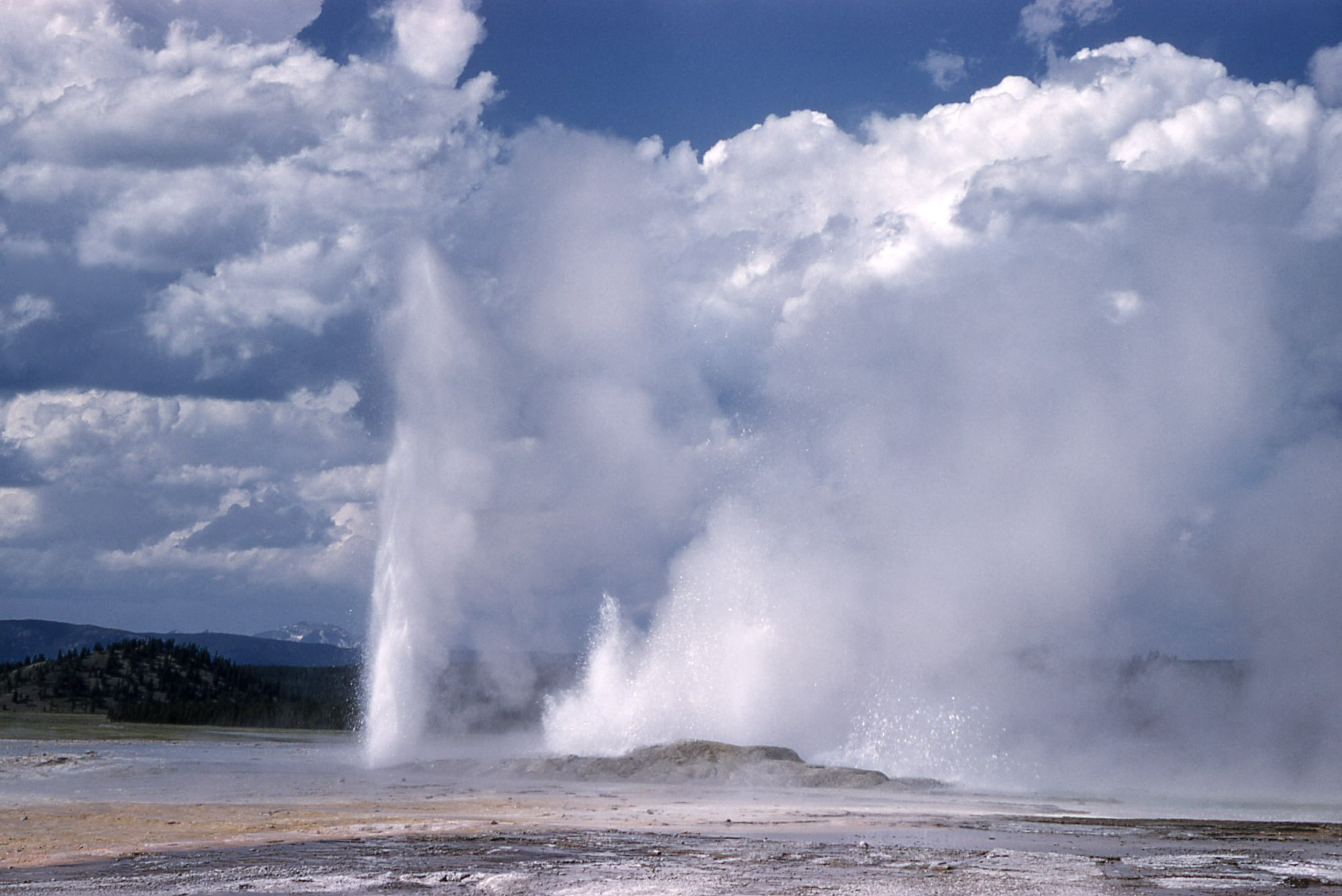
- Eruption

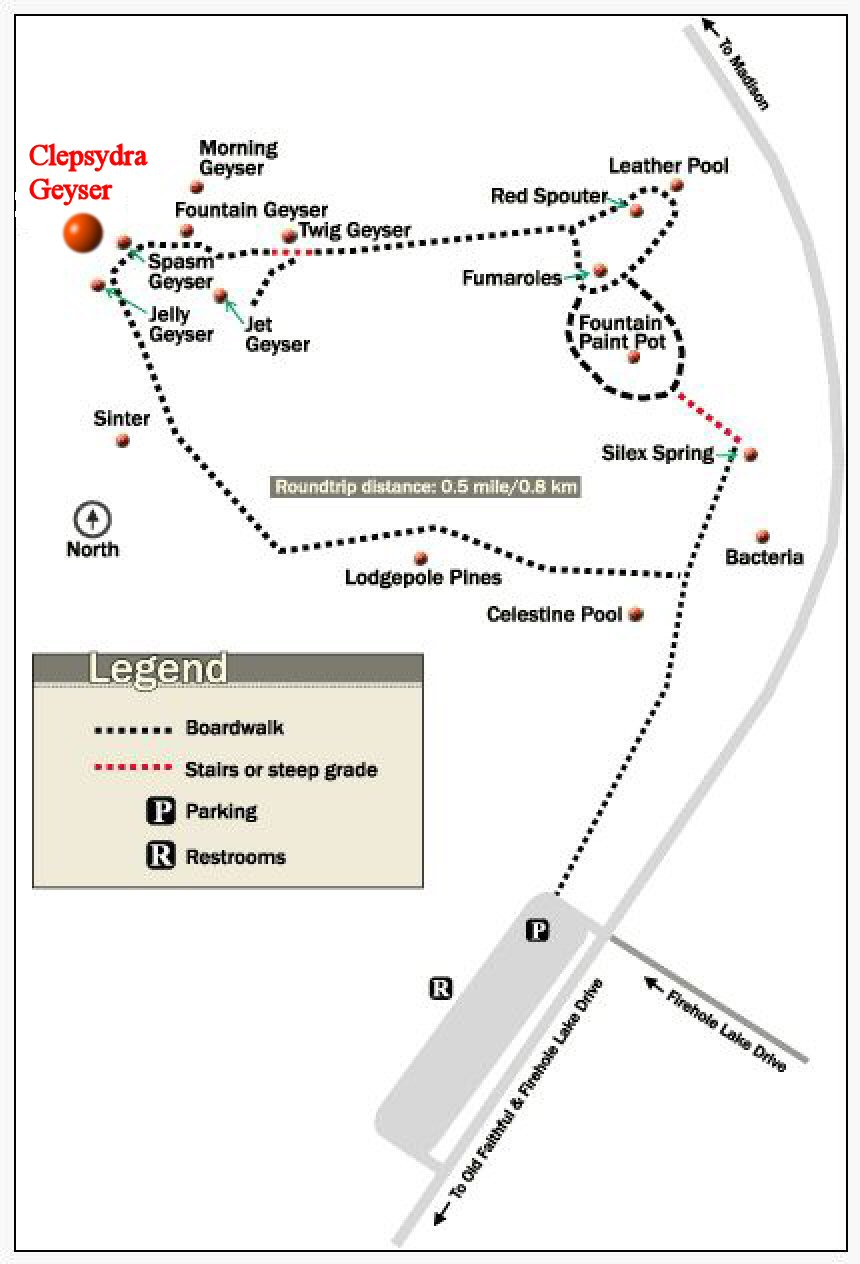
- Location at Fountain Paint Pots
- Location: Yellowstone National Park, Teton County, Wyoming
- Coordinates: 44°33′15″N 110°48′38″W
- Elevation: 7,254 feet (2,211 m)
- Type: Cone geyser
- Eruption height: 45 feet (14 m)
- Frequency: Constant

Clepsydra Geyser is a geyser in the Lower Geyser Basin of Yellowstone National Park in the United States.

Clepsydra plays nearly continuously to heights of 45 feet (14 m). It was named by T. B. Comstock during the 1878 Captain Jones expedition, with its nomenclature derived from the Greek word for water clock. Prior to the 1959 Hebgen Lake earthquake, it erupted regularly every three minutes.

2019

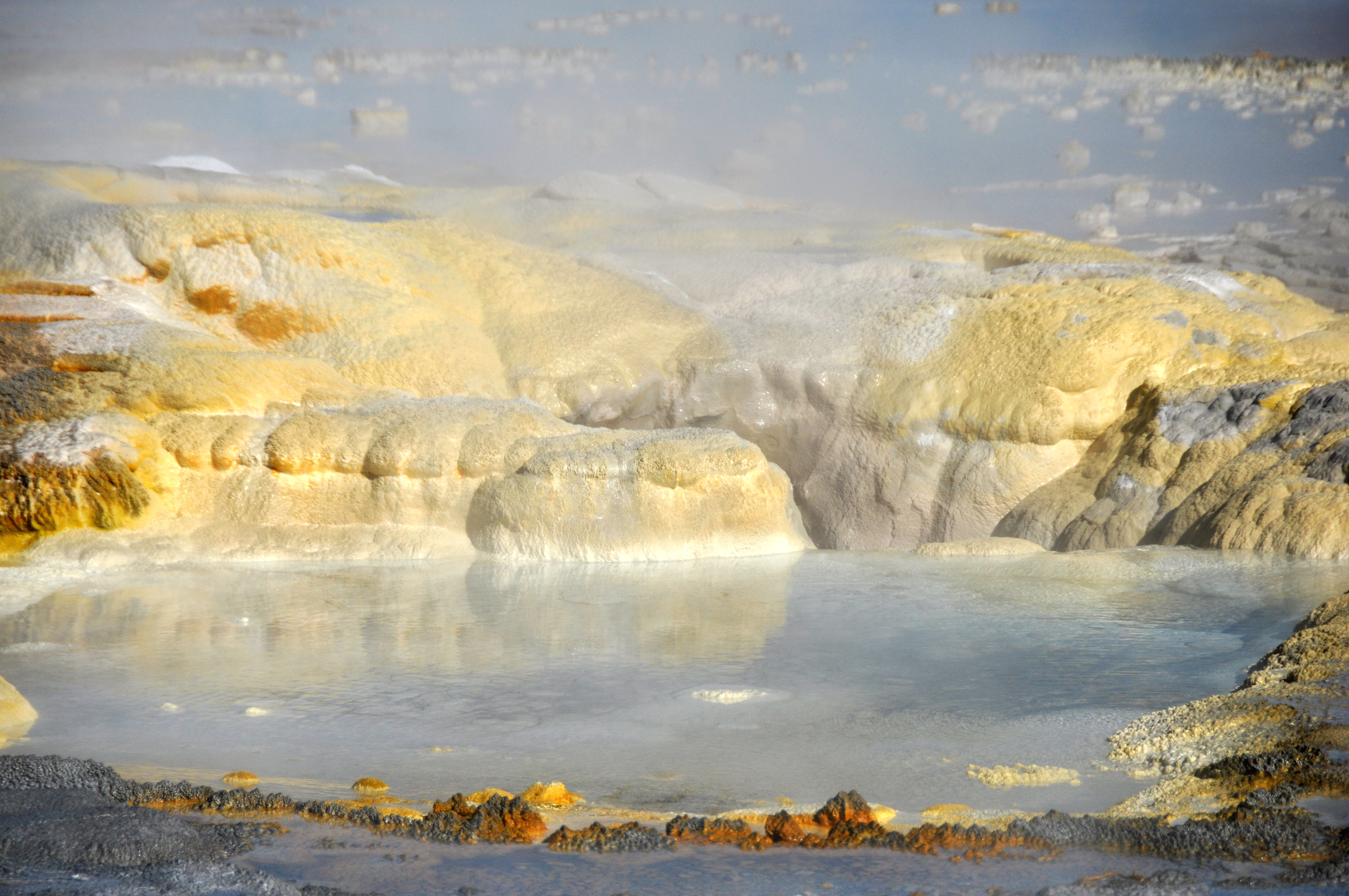
Not erupting, 2014

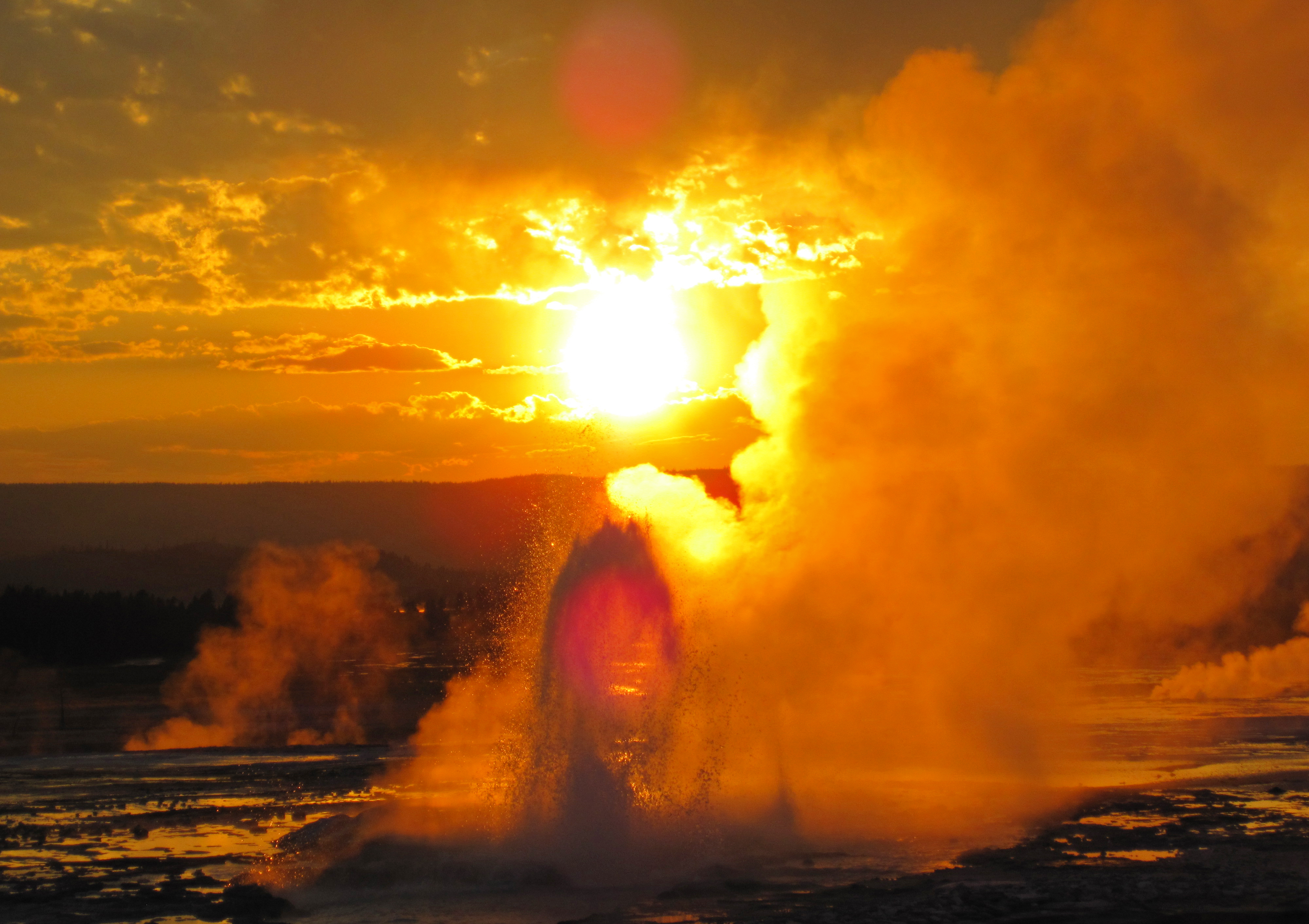
At sunset, 2017

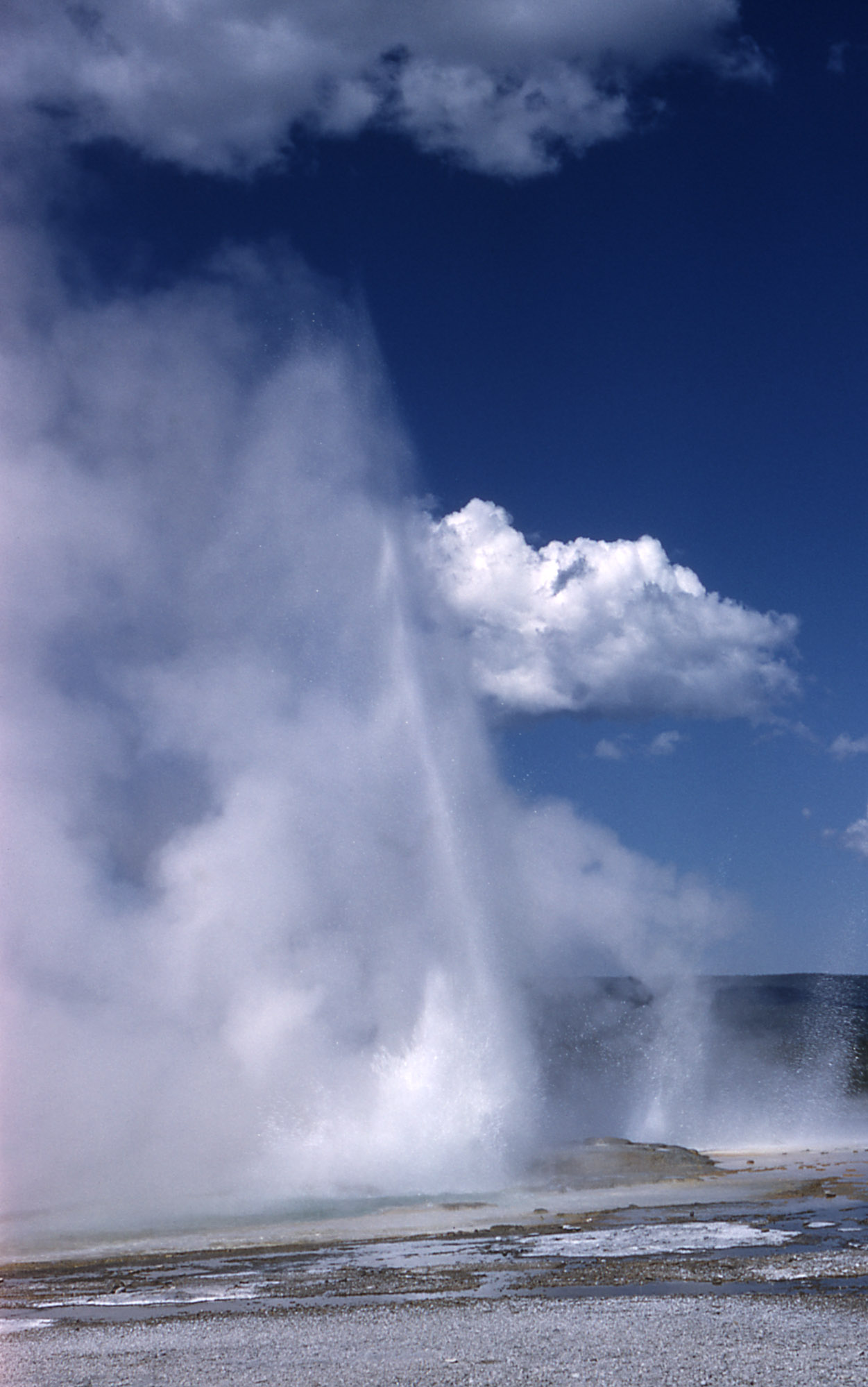
1960

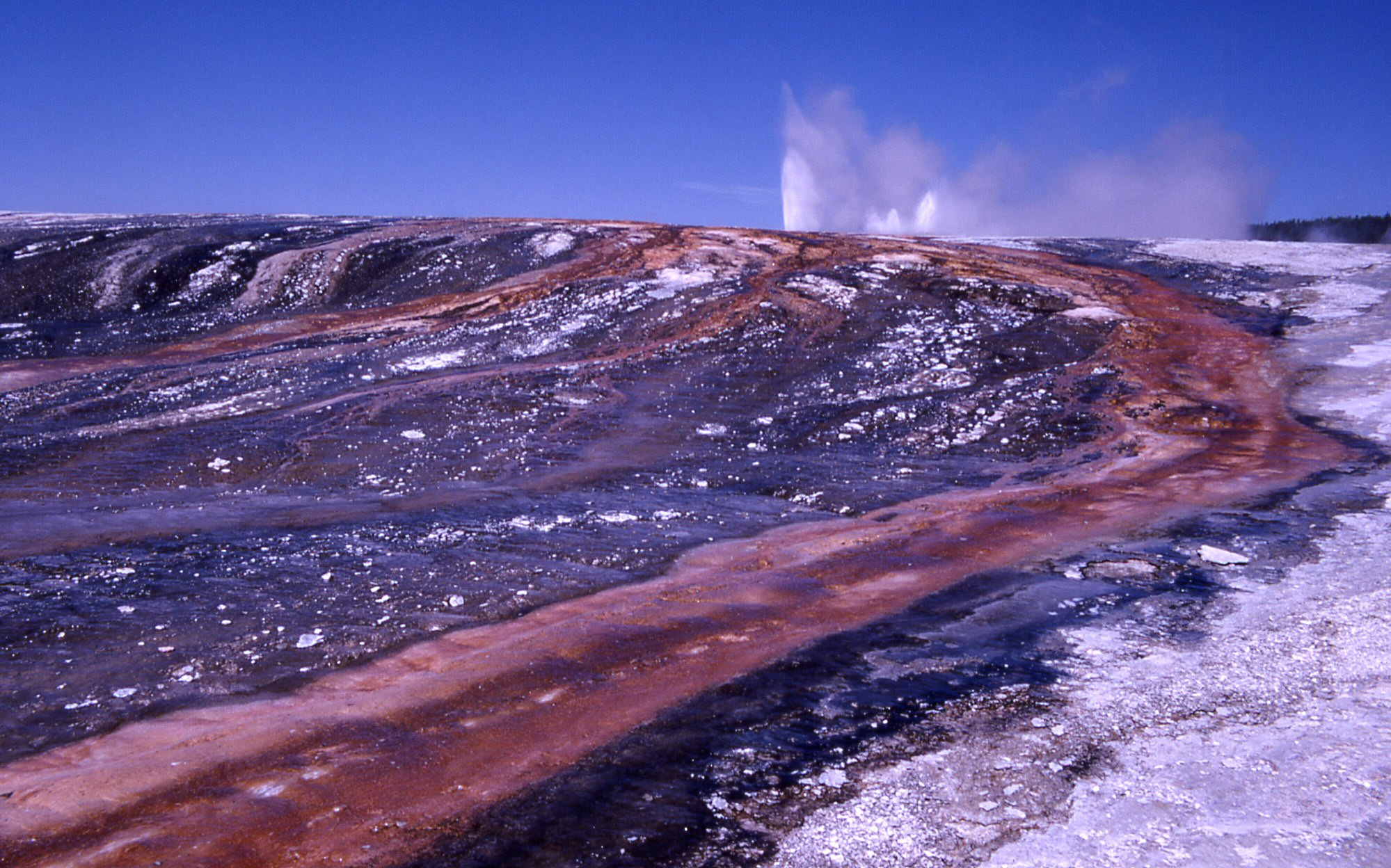
From a distance, 1965

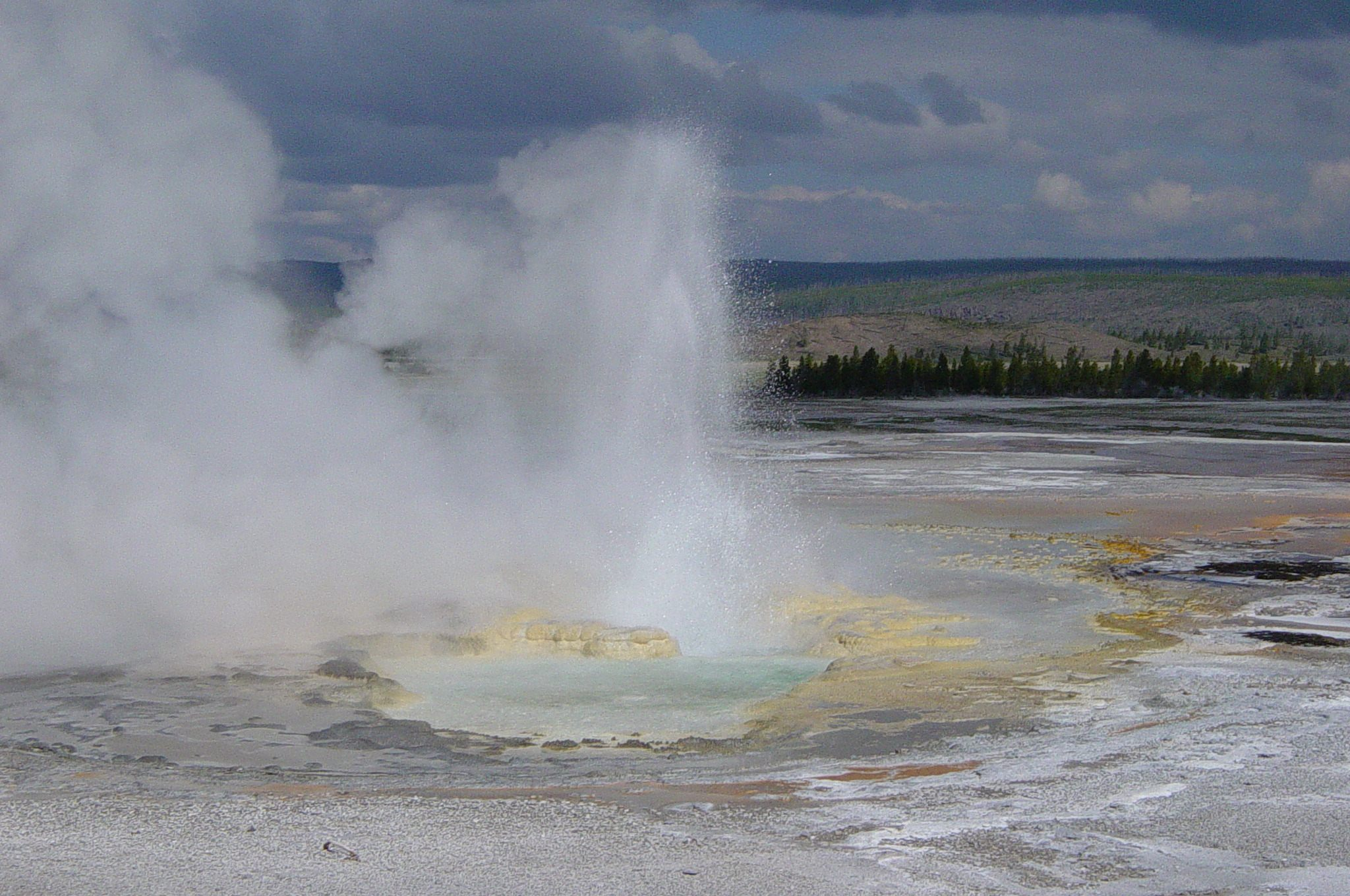
2003

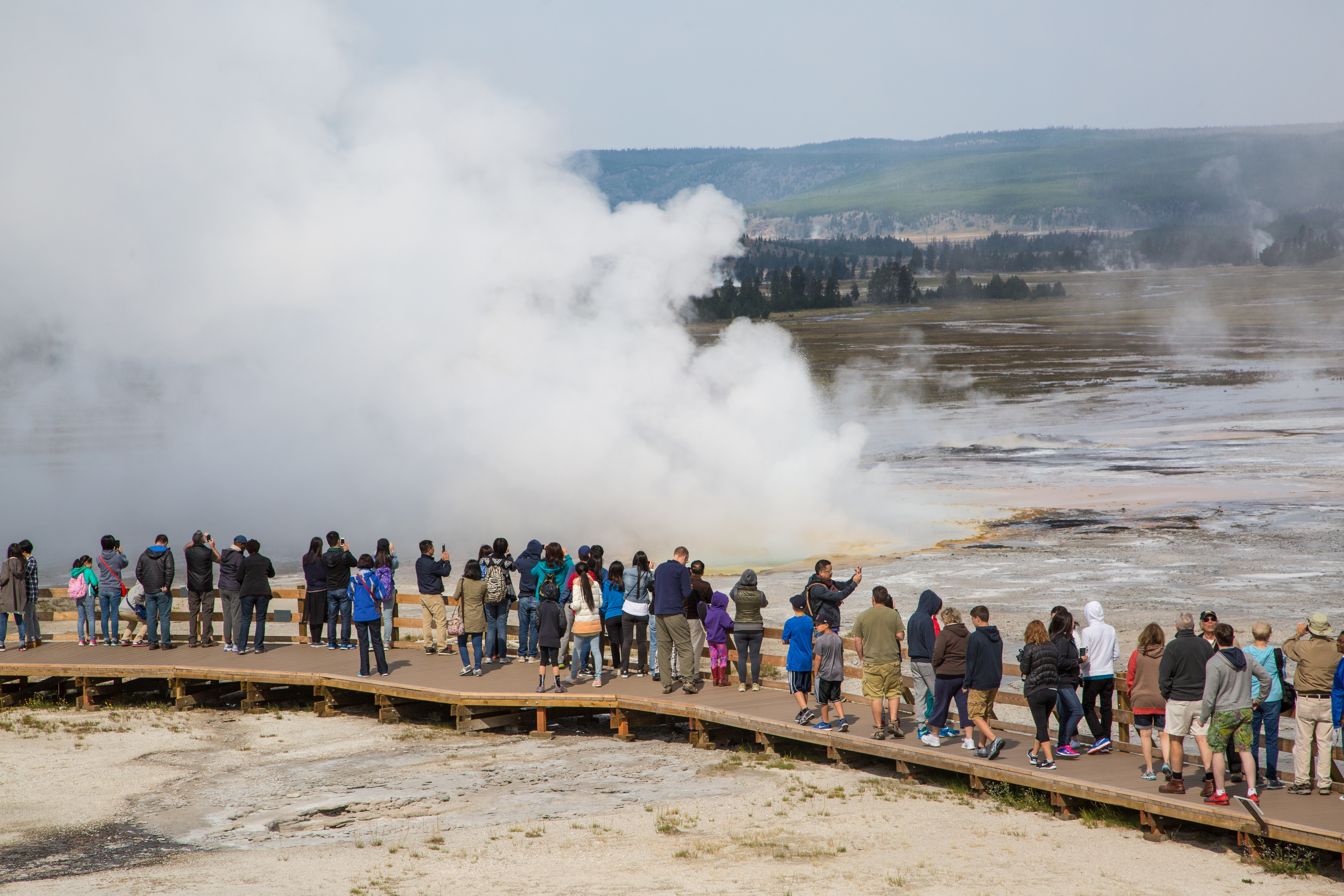
People watching Clepsydra Geyser erupt, 2015
