= Morning glory (disambiguation) =

Morning glory is a common name for many flowering plants.

Morning glory may also refer to:

== Music ==
- Morning Glory (band), an American punk band from New York
- Morning Glory, a jazz group, with an eponymous 1973 album, fronted by John Surman
- (What's the Story) Morning Glory?, a 1995 album by Oasis
  - "Morning Glory" (Oasis song), a 1995 single from the above album
  - Morning Glory (singles box), a five disc gold EP consisting of the four singles from the album
- Morning Glory (Tim Buckley album), a 1994 compilation album of Tim Buckley songs
- Morning Glory: The Tim Buckley Anthology, a 2001 two-disc compilation album of Tim Buckley songs
- "Morning Glory" (Tim Buckley song), a single by Tim Buckley from the Goodbye and Hello album
- "Morning Glory" (Bonnie Pink song), 2010
- ""Morning Glory" (Yuta Orisaka song), 2019
  - The Morning Glory EP, 2021, which includes the song
- Morning Glory, a section in the 1970 Pink Floyd song "Alan's Psychedelic Breakfast"
- Morning Glory, a 1972 album by Mary Travers
- "Morning Glory", a 2022 song by Anaïs Mitchell from Anaïs Mitchell
- "Morning Glory", a song by Gordon Lightfoot
- "Morning Glory", a 1976 single by James & Bobby Purify
- "Morning Glory", a 1976 song by The Wurzels
- "Morning Glory", a 1982 song by Tatsuro Yamashita from the album For You
- "Morning Glory", a 1988 B-side song by Enya released on A Box of Dreams
- "Mornin' Glory", a single by Bobbie Gentry from The Delta Sweete
- "Morning Glory", a 1998 song by Union Jack, as featured on Northern Exposure: Expeditions
- "Morning Glory", a 1994 song by Jamiroquai from The Return of the Space Cowboy
- "Mourning Glory", a 1992 song by Ween from Pure Guava
- "What's Your Story, Morning Glory?" by Mary Lou Williams

== Film and television ==
- Morning Glory (1933 film), a 1933 film starring Katharine Hepburn
- Morning Glory (1993 film), a 1993 film starring Christopher Reeve
- Morning Glory (2010 film), a 2010 film starring Rachel McAdams, Harrison Ford and Diane Keaton
- "Morning Glory" (Eureka Seven episode), an episode of Eureka Seven in 2005
- "Morning Glory", a 1999 episode of Bear in the Big Blue House
- Morning Glory (pony), character who debuted in 1986 film My Little Pony: The Movie
- Morning Glory (TV programme), a short-lived British Channel 4 breakfast television programme in 2006

== Places ==
- Morning Glory, Kentucky, U.S.
- Morning Glory, Texas, U.S.
- Morning Glory Pool, a hot spring in Yellowstone National Park
- Morning Glory Arch, Grandstaff Canyon, Utah, U.S.
- Morning Glory mine, a mine in Oregon
- Morning Glory Funeral Home, from the 1988 event Morning Glory Funeral Home scandal in Jacksonville, Florida, United States

== Science ==
- Morning Glory cloud, a rare meteorological phenomenon in Australia
- Morning glory disc anomaly, a rare defect of the optic nerve
- Morning glory (drug), the seeds of morning glories used as a psychedelic drug

== Other uses ==
- Morning Glory (company), a South Korean office supply company
- Morning glory, a slang term for nocturnal penile tumescence
- Morning Glory Zell-Ravenheart (1948–2014), neo-pagan poet
- Morning Glories, a comic book series by Nick Spencer
- MV Morning Glory, a 1993-built oil tanker
- Bell-mouth spillway

== See also ==
- Glory of the Morning (died 1830s), female chief of the Hocąk nation
