= Fan and Mortar Geysers =

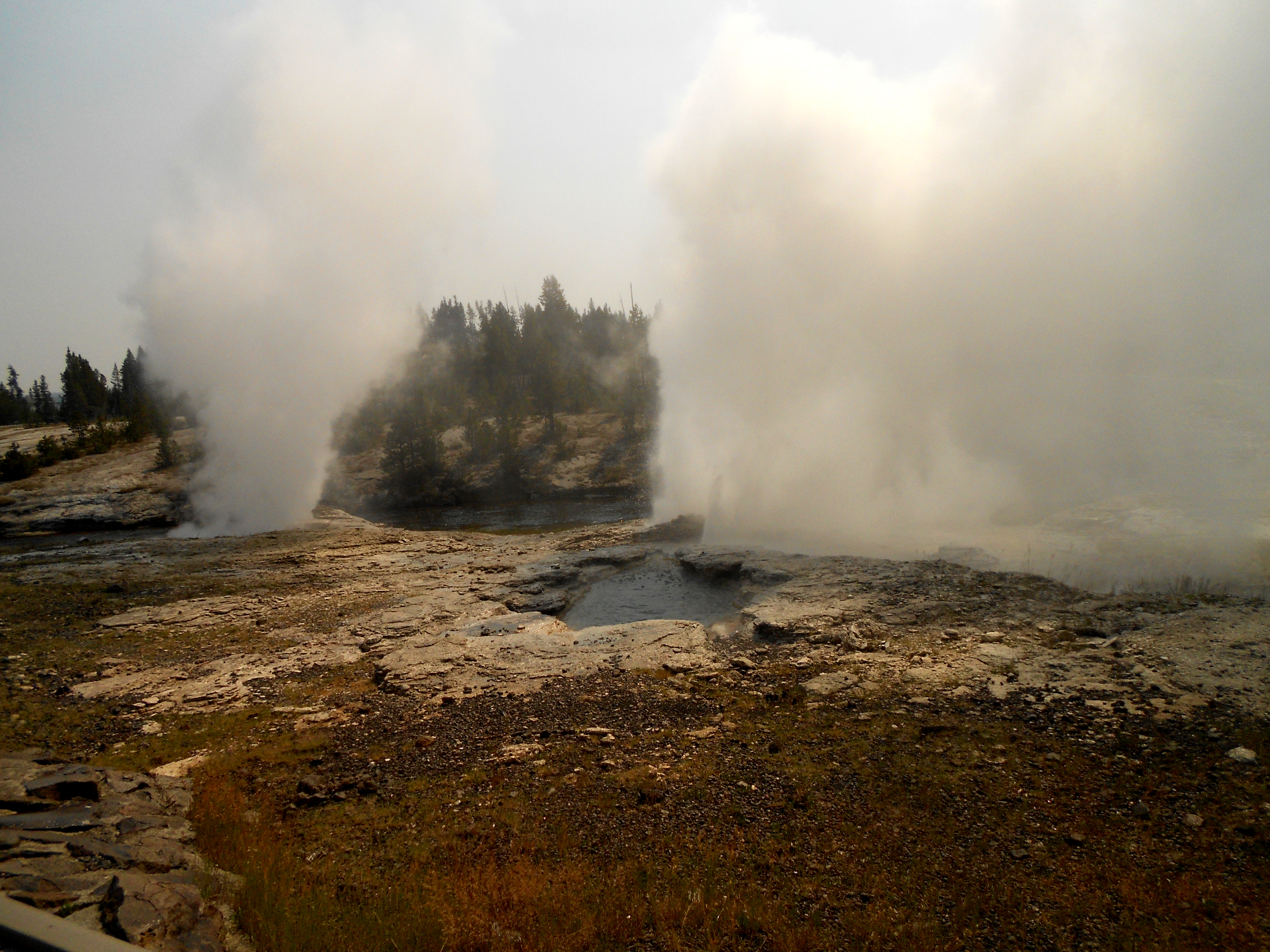
- Mortar on the left and Fan on the right
- Interactive map of Fan and Mortar Geysers
- Name origin: Fan - Washburn Party (1870); Mortar - Frank Jay Haynes (1883)
- Coordinates: 44°28′28″N 110°50′33″W
- Elevation: 7,300 feet (2,200 m)
- Type: Cone geyser
- Eruption height: Fan-125 feet, Mortar 80 feet
- Frequency: 3 days-weeks
- Duration: 30 min
- Temperature: 48.2 °C (118.8 °F)

Fan and Mortar Geysers are two geysers in the Upper Geyser Basin in Yellowstone National Park. For the past several decades, they have erupted in concert with one another and are generally talked about together. The records detailing these geysers' known eruptive history shows that they have been infrequent and irregular performers.

== History ==
Fan and Mortar's effect on the surrounding area, plus the size of their respective cones reveal that they were very active in the past. However, up until 1925, they were essentially two geysers that were very close to each other as their eruptive patterns were independent of each other and were nowhere near the power of the eruptions of today. Some time preceding 1925, the two must have eventually become connected at some depth and they have since performed as one very large geyser. Fan Geyser was named by the Washburn–Langford–Doane Expedition of 1870. Mortar Geyser was named by Frank Jay Haynes in 1883 because eruptions resembled mortar discharges.

== Location ==
The two geysers lie at the edge of the Firehole River. Fan and Mortar Geysers are easily viewed from both the bridge and the sidewalk directly leading north to Morning Glory Pool. This area is just a bit north of Riverside Geyser.

== Description ==
The two geysers lay on the edge of the Firehole River, just like Riverside Geyser. However, they are on the same side of the river as the viewing area, unlike Riverside. Mortar consists of the large mortar-looking cone on the left. It consists of the vent in the cone, known as Upper Mortar, the vent right below it, known as Lower Mortar, as well as an additional smaller vent to the left of Lower Mortar. Fan consists of at least seven vents aligned roughly perpendicular to the river. They are known as (starting closest to the river), River Vent(s), High Vent, Gold Vent, Gold 2, Angle Vent, Main Vent, and the East Vent. A numerous assortment of other vents are scattered through the area, as well as one other geyser, close to the boardwalk, known as Spiteful Geyser.

== Eruptive pattern ==
The geysers follow a series of cycles of minor activity prior to a major eruption. Normally (but not always) this cycle is:

1. All vents in the system are quiet,
2. River vent turns on. (If it turns off before Angle vent turns on it is called a "river pause")
3. High vent turns on.
4. Gold vent turns on. (If this vent and all the others turns off before Angle vent turns on it is called a "gold pause")
5. Angle vent turns on. (Cycle is complete once Angle comes on)

In an eruption cycle, the above cycle normally happens with splashing in Main vent seen and possibly having eruptions by Bottom vent. After all the above vents turn on, if High and Gold vents start erupting to 5+ ft steadily, a "lock" is called. Normally Fan and Mortar will erupt shortly after a lock is achieved but it is not an absolute certainty.

Generally the geysers are known to erupt during the completion of the above cycle, although there have been eruptions that begin with Lower Mortar, and even more rarely, Upper Mortar. Preceding an eruption, the water levels in the whole complex will generally rise. However, the geysers may erupt at any time. The geysers' eruption will become more powerful, and the water level in the complex will rise. Splashing in the river and main vents will increase, and there may be a massive surge from the east vent triggering the eruption. All the vents in Fan will constantly jet water, with the angle vent launching water up to the boardwalk, and sometimes beyond it. Fan will show why its name is so deserved, as it erupts out of all seven vents, creating a wide fan-shaped display that reaches heights of over 100 feet, and arcs water up over the boardwalk, landing 200 feet away from the vent. Mortar, while not as spectacular as Fan, sends jets out of its two main vents up to 50 feet high. Sometimes one vent will dominate the eruption sending a plume of water over 80 feet into the air. The eruption will generally last for around 15 minutes, until it stops, then restarts again, this time fading in power. It does this a few more times, until about 45 minutes have elapsed. It may then enter into a slight steam phase, during which the geysers send brief puffs of steam out of their vents.
