= Morning Glory (Yuta Orisaka song) =

Single by Yuta Orisaka

from the EP Morning Glory
- Language: Japanese
- Released: August 5, 2019
- Studio: List: Sound Dali (Setagaya, Tokyo); Mech (Meguro, Tokyo); Volta (Nakano, Tokyo); Shinkai (Yamate, Yokohama)
- Genre: J-pop
- Length: 5:36
- Label: Orisakayuta; Less+ Project
- Songwriter: Yuta Orisaka
- Producer: Yuta Orisaka

Yuta Orisaka singles chronology
| "Hoyo" / "Kai" (2019) | "Morning Glory" (2019) | "Torch" (2020) |

Music video
- "Morning Glory" on YouTube

"Morning Glory" (Japanese: 朝顔, Hepburn: Asagao) is a song by the Japanese singer-songwriter Yuta Orisaka. Written as the theme song for the medical drama series Asagao: Forensic Doctor, it was released as a single on August 5, 2019. Orisaka, who wrote and produced the song, worked closely with the drama team, and enlisted the help of violinist Atsuko Hatano for the arrangement of its strings and horns. A J-pop song piano ballad, "Morning Glory" was composed to fit within typical definitions of Japanese pop music. Orisaka performs folk-influenced vocals that call for the listener to love the morning. The outro features a sudden change to a matsuri-bayashi style with kakegoe backing vocals.

Several reviewers of "Morning Glory" complimented Orisaka's vocals and some highlighted the outro. A few critics considered it a more straightforward and pop-influenced work in comparison to Orisaka's past releases. Upon release, the song debuted at numbers 27 and 30 on the digital download sub-charts of Oricon and Billboard Japan, respectively, and helped expand Orisaka's audience through its inclusion in Asagao: Forensic Doctor. Orisaka has given performances of the song during several tours and programs, including the YouTube series The First Take.

"Morning Glory" was used in both seasons and specials of Asagao: Forensic Doctor. A second song by Orisaka,"Robin" (鶫, Tsugumi; lit. 'Dusky thrush'), debuted in the second season. An extended play (EP), also titled Morning Glory, includes the titular track, "Robin", and three additional songs. It was released on March 10, 2021, and peaked at numbers 31 and 40 on the Billboard Japan Hot Albums and Oricon Combined Albums Charts.

== Background ==
Yuta Orisaka is a Japanese singer-songwriter from Tottori Prefecture. In his early life, he lived in Russia and Iran before returning to Japan. Orisaka began his career in 2013 by live performing acoustic guitar songs, and self-released his debut mini-album Akebono (lit. 'Dawn') in 2014. He attained critical attention for Heisei (2018), his min'yō, jazz, and Latin-influenced second studio album, which won the Grand Prix at the CD Shop Awards.

On July 6, 2019, it was announced that Orisaka would perform the theme song "Morning Glory" (朝顔, Asagao) for Asagao: Forensic Doctor, a medical drama set to premiere on Fuji Television two days later. An adaptation of the manga series by Masahito Kagawa, the drama follows Maki Asagao (portrayed by Juri Ueno), a medical examiner who lost her mother to the 2011 Tōhoku earthquake and tsunami. It depicts the lives of Asagao and her surviving father, with death as the series' thematic backdrop. Drama producer Ayaka Kinjō had listened to the titular track off Heisei and said she was impressed by Orisaka's nostalgic yet unique singing voice. She thought he could help make Asagao: Forensic Doctor a "healthy" drama and decided to contact him about performing its theme song.

== Writing and production ==
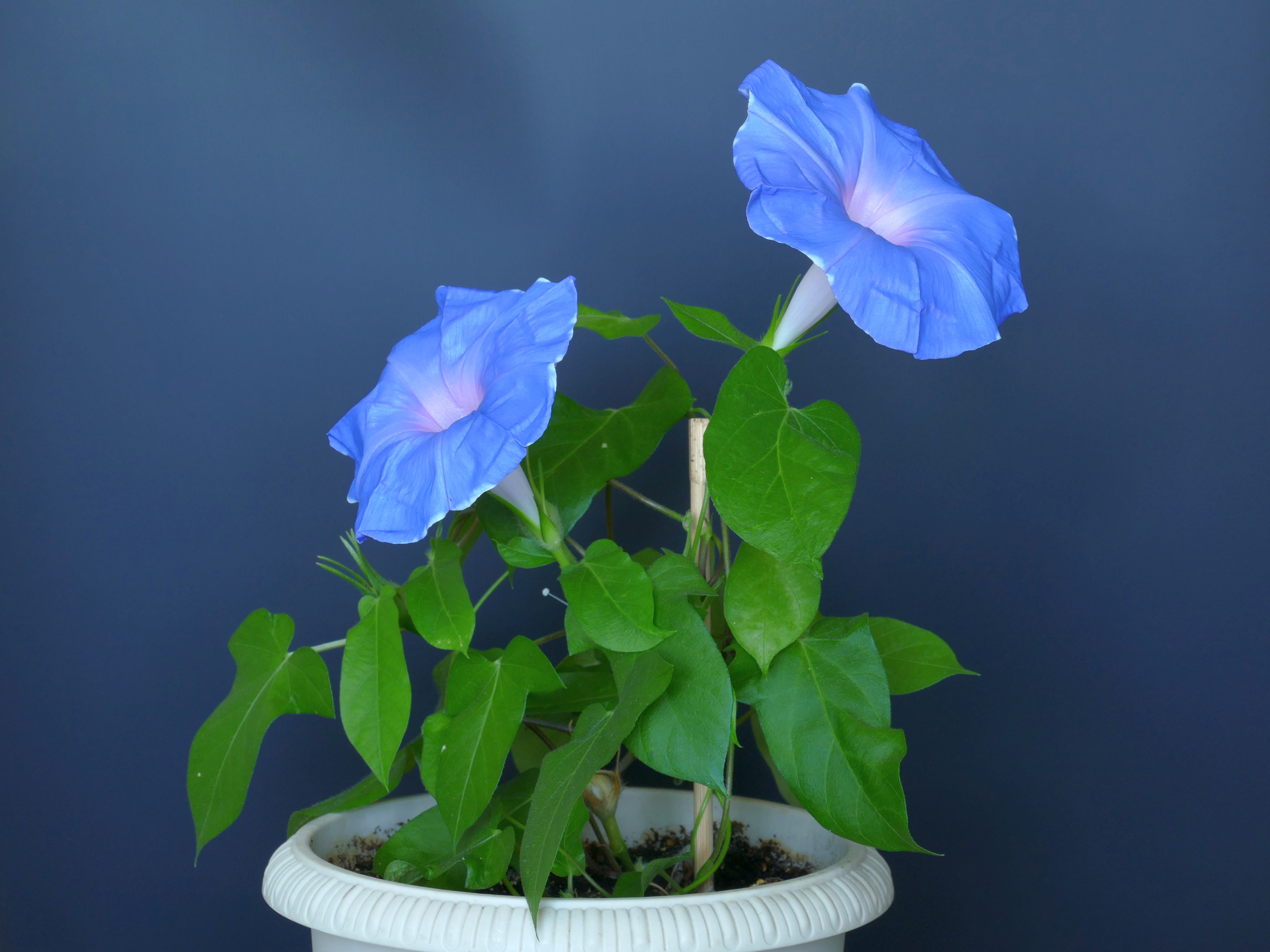
Ipomoea nil, more commonly known as the Japanese morning glory (asagao in Japanese). The imagery of such a flower blooming in the dark inspired the song's modulation from minor to major chords.

According to Orisaka, the production team did not initially provide any specific requests regarding the song's style or theme. Since he was contacted early in the show's production, he began to write the song without knowledge of its precise story structure, although he did read the manga in advance. He started with two rough versions – one more consistent with his preceding works and another in a brighter style – and performed both acoustically for the producer and director in-person. From there, in a process of trial and error, Orisaka continuously revised the song upon feedback from the production team. "Morning Glory" was his first song written for a drama, which he found challenging yet fulfilling since there were other people who could object to his creative decisions. (Note: In previous works, Orisaka had not worked with a record producer, which had given him freedom to approve his songs using his own judgement. This was not the case for "Morning Glory", where he went back-and-forth on ideas with the drama production team. In an interview with Rolling Stone Japan, he recalled that the team were peculiar even about smaller details: "They would say things like 'the imagery in this lyric is to strong' [...] But there's not much of that [in my work], so it was a very fulfilling process.")

Unlike his past music, Orisaka wrote "Morning Glory" to have a well-defined verse, pre-chorus, and chorus, so that the song would fit the typical form of J-pop music. He saw the production as an attempt to fit his personal style onto the rules of J-pop, rather than an attempt to create a style from scratch. Although there was direction from the drama team, Orisaka primarily based "Morning Glory" upon what he personally felt was portrayed in Asagao: Forensic Doctor. The song shares its title both with the show's protagonist and the Japanese morning glory flower. Orisaka had heard that while the flower is typically associated with the morning, it actually starts to bloom at night. This imagery – a flower slowly blooming in the dark – inspired the song's modulation between J-pop and kayōkyoku-inspired minor and major chords.

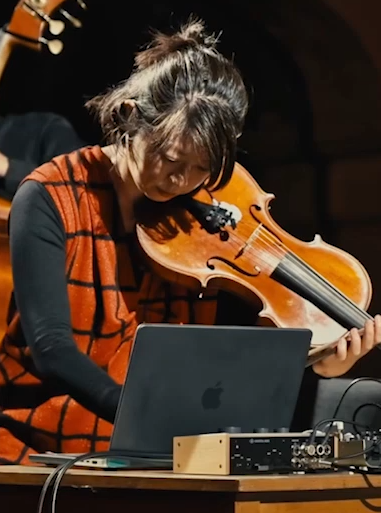
Atsuko Hatano (pictured 2025), a returning collaborator from Heisei, arranged the song's strings and horns.

While the first drafts were based upon guitar, "Morning Glory" was eventually changed to a piano and string-centered piece since both Orisaka and the drama team considered this to be more typical for J-pop music. For the string and horn sections, Orisaka enlisted the help of Atsuko Hatano, a violinist who previously arranged the strings on Heisei. Since he viewed such instrumentation as an integral part of modern J-pop and kayōkyoku, Orisaka considered the strings a "must". Other musicians returning from Heisei include members from the bands Yoji & His Ghost Band and Ni Kakusui, who also tour with Orisaka as part of his backup band. "Morning Glory" was recorded, mixed, and mastered by Kōsuke Nakamura at Studio Sound Dali, Studio Mech, and Volta Studio in Tokyo, and Shinkai Studio in Yokohama. Orisaka served as the record producer.

== Composition ==
"Morning Glory"
The chorus to "Morning Glory", a J-pop song and piano ballad with soft-spoken folk vocals and a string section.

"Morning Glory" is a 5 minute and 36 seconds-long J-pop piano ballad. According to sheet music notes published by Yamaha Music Entertainment Holdings, the original piano composition is set in the key of E major.

The instrumentation of "Morning Glory" opens with piano and develops to add Orisaka's soft-spoken vocals and Hatano's string section. According to music critic Shino Okamura for AERA Digital, "Morning Glory" is a straight-forward modern ballad centered around melody and Orisaka's vocals, unlike the more "advanced" compositions on Heisei. Orisaka's voice includes elements of folk music such as yodeling and min'yō singing. He uses only a handful of notes and performs a breath-filled vibrato, which Okamura described as characteristically different from most Japanese pop and rock singers.

Writing for Excite Japan, drama reviewer Fuyu Kimata compared the lyrics of "Morning Glory" to a requiem; Orisaka said that the song is themed around feelings towards the dead, and how the dead feel about those who they left behind. In the song's chorus, Orisaka repeats the word negau (願う; lit. 'to wish') as he sings: "Koko ni negau, negau, negau, kimi ga asa o aisuru yō ni" (lit. 'Here I wish, I wish, I wish, for you to love the morning'). (Note: On the radio program Sonar Music, Orisaka clarified the lyric: he wishes for the subject to be able to love the morning, since he considers this a sign of a fulfilling life.) The song seems to end after the line "Hora, ima ni saku, hana!" (lit. 'Now, look at the blooming, the flowers!'), but the beat suddenly alters to a matsuri-bayashi (traditional Japanese festival music) style. This section introduces kakegoe background vocals and ends the song.

== Release and usage ==
"Morning Glory" was released as a digital single on August 5, 2019. A music video, directed by filmmaker Pennacky, was released to YouTube on the same day, and features a "nostalgic" quality according to Natalie writers. A 7" single was released for national Vinyl Record Day on November 3, 2019, and includes an alternate "Drama Version" on its B-side. An assembly version of "Morning Glory", recorded by Orisaka's live band, was offered as a pre-order bonus CD with his third studio album, State of Mind (2021).

"Morning Glory" was used in both the first (2019) and second seasons (2020–21) of Asagao: Forensic Doctor, (Note: The second season sees Asagao travel to Tōhoku to search for the whereabouts or body of her mother. The series became Fuji Television's first getsuku (9 PM drama) to air for two seasons.) as well as the 2022 and 2025 specials. A different song by Orisaka—"Robin" (鶫, Tsugumi; lit. 'Dusky thrush'), named after Asagao's daughter of the same name—was first used in place of "Morning Glory" at the end of the 14th episode of season 2. Orisaka sings "Hora ne, yoru ga akeru" (lit. 'Look, dawn is breaking'), which is a dual metaphor for recovery from disasters and the passing of generations. Rieko Matsumoto, writing for Asahi's Telling, conceived that the lyrics may foreshadow how Asagao's father would forget Tsugumi's name due to his developing dementia in episode 18. In an interview with Tokion, Orisaka explained that the song was influenced by the COVID-19 pandemic, social distancing, and the news report of a suicide.

== Reception ==
In reviews of "Morning Glory", several critics analyzed and commented on Orisaka's vocal performance. Okamura for AERA Digital described Orisaka's voice as a blend of international folk and pop styles, and the result as elegant and powerful. Through his voice, Okamura wrote that Orisaka obtained a unique musical identity "able to communicate great cogency through words and voice alone", but continued that he lacked masterful folk singing techniques. Enon Kawatani, a full-time musician and occasional columnist for Nikkei Entertainment, noted Orisaka's confined vocal range on "Morning Glory", but felt this improved the song's straightforward flow. He wrote: "If you have a good voice, you don't need many notes." Similarly, writers for Mikiki thought "Morning Glory" highlighted Orisaka's "straightforward" voice, and celebrated his inclusion in a television drama.

Musically, Tomonori Shiba for Real Sound considered "Morning Glory" to be Orisaka's most memorable and hummable song up until that point. Motoko Shimizu, a writer for the same site, commented that the song "gently" accompanies the story of Asagao: Forensic Doctor, and Mikiki writers considered it an emotional number that accentuates Orisaka's pop influences. A few critics gave attention to the outro, which Shiba described as "dynamic". Kawatani wrote that the change in style during the outro is unexpected, which creates a balance between novelity and nostalgia, and makes listener want to replay the song. He concluded that Orisaka had a "rare talent": "I think it's a matter of time until he creates a super hit. [Orisaka] may be the one to surpass the barrier of [Kenshi] Yonezu and Gen [Hoshino]." In a three-way tie, journalists for The Television at the 102nd The Television Drama Academy Awards voted "Morning Glory" as the fourth best drama theme song from the third quarter of 2019.

Commercially, "Morning Glory" entered the Billboard Japan Top Download Songs chart at number 58 on the issue dated August 14, 2019, but did not reach its peak until October 2, when it charted at number 30. The song remained on the rankings for 9 weeks total. On the Oricon Digital Singles Chart, "Morning Glory" peaked at number 27 and charted a total of 20 weeks. Writers noted that the inclusion of "Morning Glory" in Asagao: Forensic Doctor helped Orisaka increase his name recognition. Shiba considered 2019 a "turning point" for Orisaka's career and called "Morning Glory" the largest factor.

== Live performances ==
External videos
- Yuta Orisaka — "Morning Glory" / The First Take on YouTube

After the song's release, Orisaka embarked on the acoustic tour Orisaka Yuta no Tsū to Ieba Kā 2019, where he performed "Morning Glory". In other media, he performed the song for J-Wave Tokyo Morning Radio on September 11, 2019, and for the inaugural episode of the SKY PerfecTV! program Shin-seiki Music together with the song "Shakuyaku" on December 5, 2019. On December 11, 2020, Orisaka appeared on The First Take—a YouTube video series where artists perform songs in one take—and performed "Morning Glory" using a loop pedal and Fender American Standard Telecaster electric guitar. Reporters for Barks wrote that Orisaka gave a "valuable vocal performance". (Note: Orisaka also recorded a performance of his follow-up single "Torch" for The First Take, which was released twelve days later on December 23.) In 2021, he performed the song for the program Music Fair on January 16, and for a special of Music Station on April 9.

Orisaka also continued to include the song on the setlists for his headlining concert tours, including Utsusu (2021), the State of Mind Tour (2021), Open Burn (2022), Ride (2023), and the Spell Tour (2024). Staging for the song has taken use of lighting. During an additional show of the State of Mind Tour, a shadow play of a flower illuminated the walls of the Shibuya Public Hall; and during the Spell Tour, the lighting was strengthened upon the song's last chorus, which a reporter for Natalie compared to the clearing of fog.

== Credits ==
Credits adapted from the "Morning Glory" music video description on YouTube

Locations

- Studio Sound Dali (Setagaya, Tokyo) — recording
- Studio Mech (Meguro, Tokyo) — recording
- Volta Studio (Nakano, Tokyo) — recording
- Shinkai Studio (Yamate, Yokohama) — recording

Production

- Yuta Orisaka – record producer
- Kōsuke Nakamura (of Kangaroo Paw) – recording, mixing, mastering
- Takeshi Hirokawa – artwork painting
- Satoshi Suzuki – artwork design
- Yu Nakazato – management, A&R

Musicians

- Yuta Orisaka – vocals, gut-string guitar
- Yoji Terada (of Yoji and His Ghost Band) – bass
- Keijirō Aono (of Yoji and His Ghost Band) – electric bass
- Haruka Ijima (of Ni Kakusui) – piano
- Kunihiko Tanaka (of Yoji and His Ghost Band) – drums
- Ryotaro Miyasaki (of Chōjō Genshō) – tambourine, kakegoe
- Atsuko Hatano – violin, arrangement of strings and horns
- Yūko Kajitani – violin
- Sena Ōjima – viola
- Kirin Uchida cello
- Santa Takahashi (of 1983) – flugelhorn
- Takumi Matsumura (of 1983) – flute

Music video

- Pennacky – director
- Kayoko Nagatomi – stylist
- Moe Takemoto – hair and make-up
- Takahiro Kawahara – producer
- Saki Irie – production assistant
- CEKAI – production company

== Track listing ==
All tracks are written by Yuta Orisaka.

"Morning Glory" single — digital download and streaming; 7" vinyl, side A
| No. | Title | Length |
|---|---|---|
| 1. | "Morning Glory" (朝顔, Asagao) | 5:36 |

"Morning Glory" single — 7" vinyl, side B
| No. | Title | Length |
|---|---|---|
| 2. | "Morning Glory" (Drama Version) | 5:36 |
| Total length: | | 11:14 |

== Charts ==
Weekly chart performance for "Morning Glory"
| Chart (2019) | Peak position |
|---|---|
| Japan Top Download Songs (Billboard Japan) | 30 |
| Japan Digital Singles (Oricon) | 27 |

== Release history ==
Release dates and formats for "Morning Glory"
| Region | Date | Format(s) | Label | Ref. |
|---|---|---|---|---|
| Various | August 5, 2019 | Digital download; streaming | Orisakayuta; Less+ Project | |
| Japan | November 3, 2019 | 7" single | Orisakayuta; Less+ Project | |

== Morning Glory EP ==
Morning Glory

EP by Yuta Orisaka
- Released: March 10, 2021
- Length: 19:20
- Language: Japanese (Note: "Asadoya Yunta", a cover of a Ryukyuan folk song, includes lyrics in the Yaeyama language.)
- Labels: Orisakayuta; Less+ Project

Yuta Orisaka chronology
| Heisei (2018) | Morning Glory (2021) | State of Mind (2021) |

Singles from Morning Glory
- 1. "Morning Glory" Released: August 5, 2019

On January 26, 2021, Orisaka announced a mini album/extended play (EP), also titled Morning Glory (朝顔, Asagao). The full track listing was unveiled on February 15, alongside the announcement of "Robin" for use in Asagao: Forensic Doctor. The Morning Glory EP includes "Morning Glory" and "Robin" as the opening and closing tracks, respectively, and three new songs: "The Needle's Eye", a cover of the Okinawan folk song "Asadoya Yunta", and the instrumental "Waltz of the Remnants". The EP was issued as both a physical and digital release on March 10, 2021. Limited physical editions included a DVD video of Orisaka's performance at Keep on Fuji Rockin' II (On the Road to Naeba 2021) on New Year's Eve 2020, an online festival held during COVID-19 restrictions on music venues. A demo CD of "Morning Glory", titled "asagao_demo_0530" and featuring different melody and lyrics, was offered with the album as a first-come first-served pre-order bonus.

External videos
- Mini Album Morning Glory Studio Live playlist on YouTube

Alongside the album's release, it was announced that studio performance videos of all five tracks—directed by visual artist Yohei Haga—would be premiered weekly to Orisaka's YouTube channel, starting February 24, 2021. The song order was not revealed beforehand and kept a mystery until each song's day of upload; upcoming videos were titled "???".

=== Development ===
Production on the Morning Glory EP sprung from plans to release the "Morning Glory" song on CD, which Orisaka said had been requested by drama viewers, his family, and friends from his hometown. Since he had also been contacted to write "Robin" as a second song for the show, Orisaka decided to release the songs together. "Robin" took approximately half a year to write; Orisaka noted that although he struggled on "Morning Glory", "Robin" was almost more difficult since he now also had a standard to follow. He felt that the different production processes on the songs created a gap between the rest of his discography, so conceived the Morning Glory EP as a "bridge" with additional songs to serve as a tsuiku (antithesis). At one point, Orisaka's third studio album, State of Mind (2021), was produced with "Morning Glory" at its center, until the COVID-19 pandemic prompted Orisaka to rework the album's track listing.

The Morning Glory EP was primarily produced by Orisaka together with an ensemble—consisting of Hatano on strings, Ni Kakusui's Haruka Ijima on piano, Keitaro Kanamine on bass, and Reizaburō Adachi on drums and saxophone—who also play in the studio performance videos, while Kōsuke Nakamura returned as audio engineer. In their attempts to incorporate Hatano's strings during the recording of "Robin", Orisaka and Nakamura took reference from the Beatles' Let It Be... Naked (2003)—a stripped down version of the band's Let It Be (1970)—and a live performance by John Lennon of "Imagine" (1971). Although Let It Be... Naked removes the strings found in the 1970 original, Orisaka thought the arrangement style could help shape the strings sound on "Robin".

Orisaka conceived the title for "The Needle's Eye" while he was struggling to write "Robin". The lyrics were influenced by living despite hardships, a feeling which Orisaka thought became more tangible during the COVID-19 pandemic. In contrast, the composition was made to be more positive. "Asadoya Yunta" had been a part of Orisaka's live repertoire and was often paired with "Morning Glory" since the latter's release, due to similar theming about departures. The arrangement used on the EP was influenced by Sam Amidon's "Hallelujah" (2020), but Orisaka said that he mainly played chords based upon gut feeling.

Originally, Morning Glory was supposed to only include four songs, and news outlets reported this four-track length upon the EP's announcement in January. However, Orisaka was unsatisfied with the album's shape since he felt an intermission was lacking between the "completely" different styles of "Asadoya Yunta" and "Robin". After returning home from a rehearsal the day before the album's recording, Orisaka recalled seeing his "dead-looking" face in the mirror, which inspired him to write "Waltz of the Remnants". He quickly taped a demo and went over the track with Hatano and Adachi the day thereafter. The instrumental song was conceived as background music for livelihood; Orisaka said he felt a connection to the drama, since it depicts the lives of those who Asagao's mother left behind.

=== Reception ===
CDJournal writers described the Morning Glory EP as a collection of songs that "affirm and celebrate the act of living". Okamura wrote for AERA Digital that the EP centers around vocals and melody, unlike the more "advanced" and experimental compositions found on albums such as Heisei, but noted that this allowed Morning Glory to function as a demonstration of Orisaka's vocal style. According to Okamura, the guitar, piano, sax, bass, and drums mainly serve to support Orisaka's singing; regardless, she praised the Hatano's springs, which she described as nostalgic, and the instrumental performance on "Waltz of the Remnants", which she thought created the feeling of song despite the lack of singing.

Commercially, the Morning Glory EP became Orisaka's highest debut on the Billboard Japan Hot Albums, where it entered at number 31 on the week dated March 17, 2021. It became his first entry onto the Oricon CD Albums and Combined Albums charts, where it peaked at numbers 27 and 40, respectively.

=== Credits ===
Credits – which apply to all songs except the titular "Morning Glory" – are adapted from a news post on Orisaka's official website, except where otherwise cited

- Yuta Orisaka – vocals, guitar
- Atsuko Hatano – strings
- Haruka Ijima (of Ni Kakusui) – piano
- Keitaro Kanamine – bass
- Reizaburō Adachi – tenor saxophone, drums
- Kōsuke Nakamura – engineering

=== Track listing ===
All tracks—except for two—are written solely by Yuta Orisaka. "Asadoya Yunta" is a cover of a traditional Ryukyuan folk composition with lyrics by Katsu Hoshi. "Torch" features music by Butaji and lyrics by Orisaka.

Morning Glory EP — regular edition (digital download, streaming, and CD)
| No. | Title | Length |
|---|---|---|
| 1. | "Morning Glory" | 5:37 |
| 2. | "The Needle's Eye" (針の穴, Hari no Ana) | 3:05 |
| 3. | "Asadoya Yunta" (安里屋ユンタ) | 3:18 |
| 4. | "Waltz of the Remnants" (のこされた者のワルツ, Nokosareta Mono no Warutsu) | 2:28 |
| 5. | "Robin" (鶫, Tsugumi, lit. 'Dusky thrush') | 4:52 |
| Total length: | | 19:20 |

Morning Glory EP — first press edition (DVD) — Keep on Fuji Rockin' II (On the Road to Naeba 2021)

1. "Mii Chang" (みーちゃん, Mī-chan)
2. "The Devil" (悪魔, Akuma)
3. "Sakamichi" (坂道; lit. 'Slope')
4. "Morning Glory"
5. "Spirit" (心, Kokoro)
6. "Torch" (トーチ, Tōchi)
7. "Fire" (炎, Honō)
8. "Spring Comes" (春, Haru; lit. 'Spring')
9. "Shakuyaku" (芍薬; lit. 'Chinese peony')

Total length: c. 50:00

Morning Glory EP — pre-order bonus CD

1. "asagao_demo_0530"

=== Charts ===
Weekly chart performance for Morning Glory (EP)
| Chart (2021) | Peak position |
|---|---|
| Japanese Hot Albums (Billboard Japan) | 31 |
| Japan (Oricon) | 27 |
| Japanese Combined Albums (Oricon) | 40 |

=== Release history ===
Release dates and formats for Morning Glory EP
| Region | Edition | Date | Format(s) | Label | Ref. |
|---|---|---|---|---|---|
| Various | Standard | March 10, 2021 | Digital download; streaming | Orisakayuta; Less+ Project | |
| Japan | Standard | March 10, 2021 | CD | Orisakayuta; Less+ Project | |
| Japan | First Limited | March 10, 2021 | CD+DVD | Orisakayuta; Less+ Project | |
| Japan | Pre-order bonus | March 10, 2021 | Demo CD ("asagao_demo_0530") | Orisakayuta; Less+ Project | |
| Japan | Standard | March 27, 2021 | Rental CD | Unknown | |

== See also ==
- Impact of the COVID-19 pandemic on the music industry
