= Asadoya Yunta =

Japanese folk song

Asadoya Yunta (Yaeyama: 安里屋ユンタ, Asadoya Yunta) is a Ryukyuan folk song originating from the Yaeyama Islands of Okinawa Prefecture, Japan.

== History ==
=== Origins ===
The lyrics to Asadoya Yunta originated from a story where a beautiful lady from Taketomi Island, known as Asato Kuyama (安里クヤマ) (1722-1799), received a wedding proposal from a Ryukyuan government official who came from another island. In one version of the story, the woman bravely rejects the proposal as she felt as if marrying a local man from her island would provide a better life than to become a mistress of this official. In another version, Kuyama ends up marrying him. The first version is popular in the Okinawa Islands whereas the latter version is popular in Taketomi.

There is an anti-government motive behind this song, as it took place when the Japanese owned the Ryukyu Kingdom as one of its vassal states, heavily taxing the local populace.

=== Popularity ===
While initially popular in the Ryukyu Islands, it soon spread to mainland Japan in 1934, when Nippon Columbia created a Japanese language version of it. The Japanese lyrics were more of a love song rather than a retelling of Asadoya nu Kuyama's story.

== Lyrics ==
These are the original lyrics in the Yaeyama language (Taketomi dialect):

Romaji	Kanji
Saa Asadoyanu Kuyama ni yo Saa yui yui Anchurasa unmaribashi yo Matahaarinu chindara kanushama yo Saa Mizashishu nu kuyudara yo Saa yui yui Ataroyanu nuzumuta yo Matahaarinu chindara kanushama yo Saa Mizashishu bananba yo Saa yui yui Ataroyaya kuriya oisu yo Matahaarinu chindara kanushama yo	サァ 安里屋ぬ クヤマによ サーユイユイ あん美（ちゅ）らさ うん生（ま）りばしよ マタハーリヌ チンダラ カヌシャマヨ サァ 目差主（みざししゅ）ぬ 請（く）ゆだらよ サァユイユイ あたろ親（や）ぬ 望（ぬず）むたよ マタハーリヌ チンダラ カヌシャマヨ サァ 目差主や 我（ば）なんばよ サァユイユイ あたろ親（や）や 此（く）りゃおいすよ マタハーリヌ チンダラ カヌシャマヨ

== In popular culture ==
Numerous artists have performed covers of Asadoya Yunta, such as:

- in 1961, The Tokyo Cuban Boys on the album More Echoes of Japan,
- in 1962, Chiemi Eri on the album チエミの民謡ハイライツ (Chiemi Sings Japanese Folk Songs Highlights),
- in 1978, Haruomi Hosono and the Yellow Magic Orchestra on the album Paraiso,
- in 1989, Ryuichi Sakamoto on the album Beauty,
- in 2001, Isato Nakagawa on the album Tree Circle,
- in 2002, Rimi Natsukawa on the album Tida: Tida Kaji nu Umui,
- in 2003, Blondie on the album The Curse of Blondie under the title Magic.
