= Artbox =

South Korean lifestyle company

- Native name: 아트박스
- Romanized name: Ateubakseu
- Industry: Lifestyle and stationery
- Founded: 1984; 41 years ago
- Headquarters: Seoul, South Korea

Artbox (Korean: 아트박스) is a South Korean lifestyle and stationery company. It was first established in 1984 as part of Samsung Publishing. It became an independent company in 1986.

The company reportedly has a target audience of people in their 10s and 20s. It reportedly targets opening stores in highly trafficked areas on the street level. It opened 32 new stores in 2023, and had 187 stores in operation. 174 of those stores were directly managed by the company.

It sells a variety of goods, including stationery, writing utensils, pajamas, soju glasses, and more. It has been compared not to other stationery companies, but to Daiso.

It opened a store in Vancouver, Canada in 2023. The store had various K-pop goods and beauty products as well.

== See also ==
- Morning Glory (company) – South Korean stationery company
