= Riverside Geyser =

Geyser in Yellowstone National Park, Wyoming

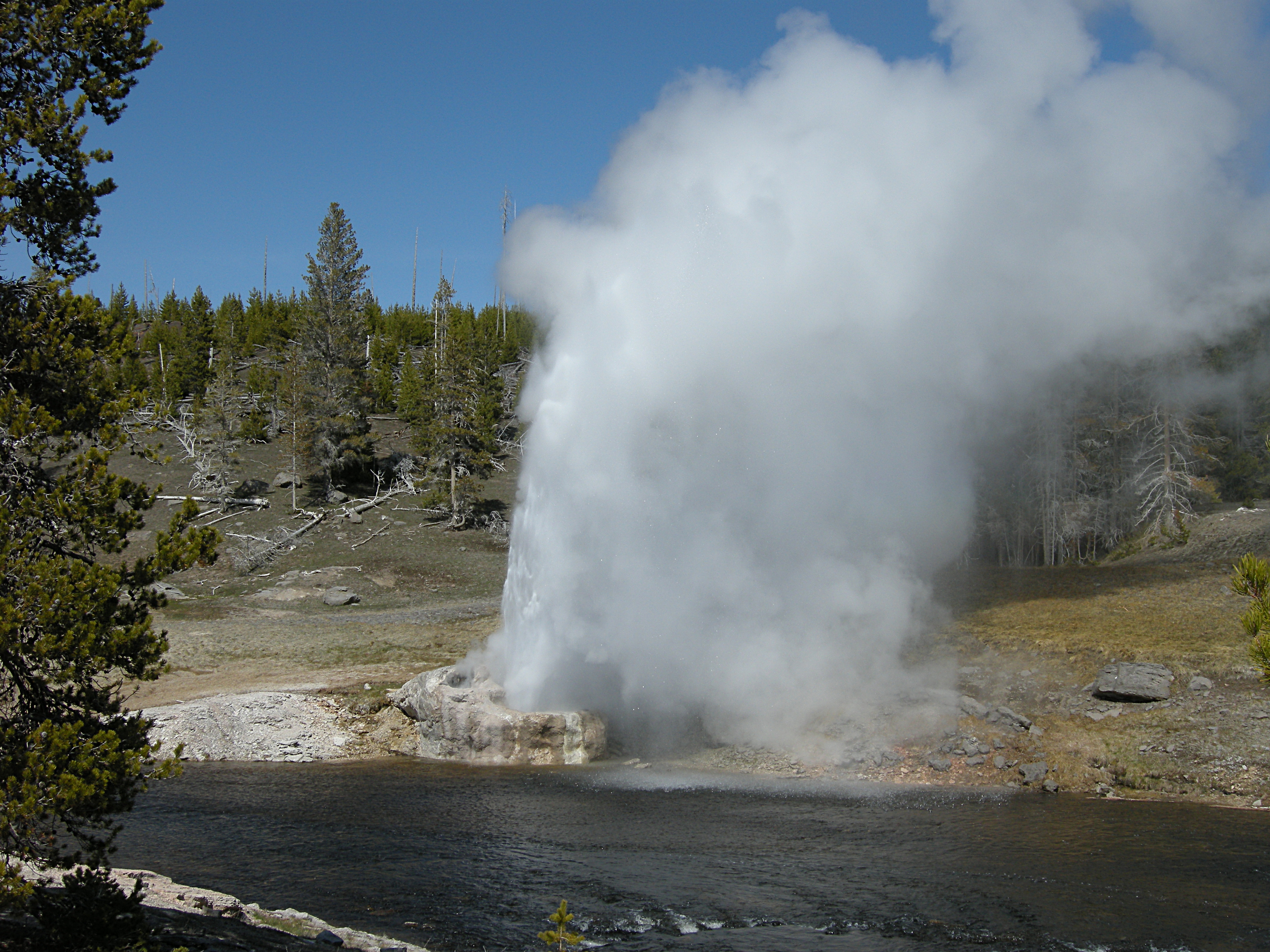
- Full Eruption 2009
- Interactive map of Riverside Geyser
- Location: Upper Geyser Basin, Yellowstone National Park, Teton County, Wyoming
- Coordinates: 44.4735439°N 110.8404890°W
- Type: Cone geyser
- Eruption height: 75 feet (23 m)
- Frequency: 5 - 7 hours
- Duration: 20 minutes
- Temperature: 82.1 °C (179.8 °F)

Riverside Geyser is a geyser in Yellowstone National Park in the U.S. state of Wyoming.

The geyser is located on the Firehole River within the Upper Geyser Basin. The geyser shoots steam and water to heights of 75 feet (23 m) in an arch over the river, sometimes causing rainbows. The eruptions occur every 5^{1}/_{2} to 7 hours. As is Old Faithful, Riverside is one of the most predictable geysers in the park, because it is not located near any other geysers that may disrupt the flow of underground water in the geyser's plumbing. Riverside is unique in its way that eruptions rarely happen at the average interval for any given time. Instead, Riverside is bimodal, meaning it usually erupts 20 minutes before or 25 minutes late for a duration of 20 minutes. For an hour or two before the eruption, water pours over the edge of the cone. The geyser was named by the Hayden Geological Survey of 1871.

The geyser is one of the most reliable geysers in Yellowstone, despite the moniker and reputation of the better-known Old Faithful.

Riverside geyser erupting into the firehole river

Images of Riverside Geyser
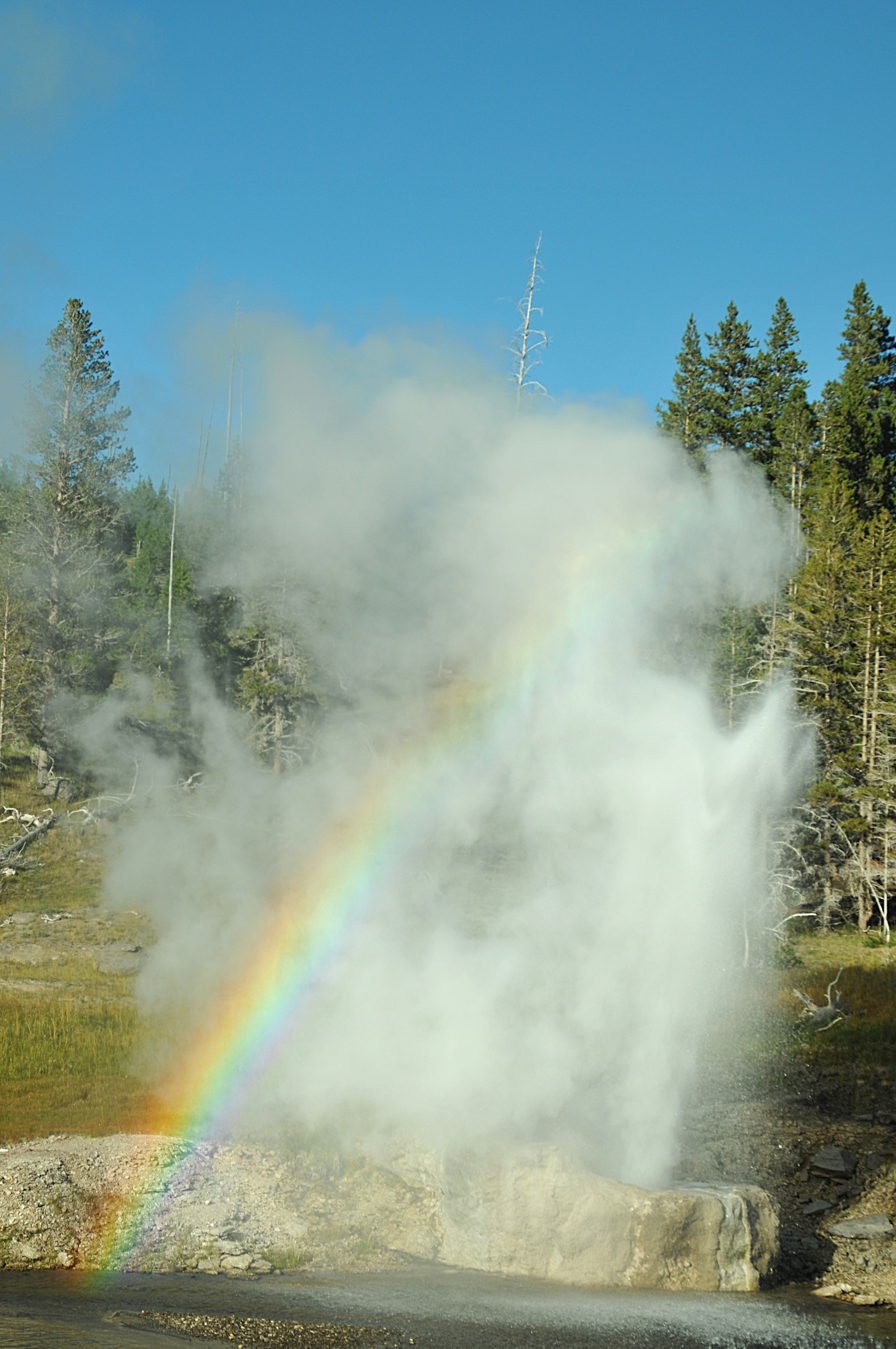
Eruption with rainbow, 2010

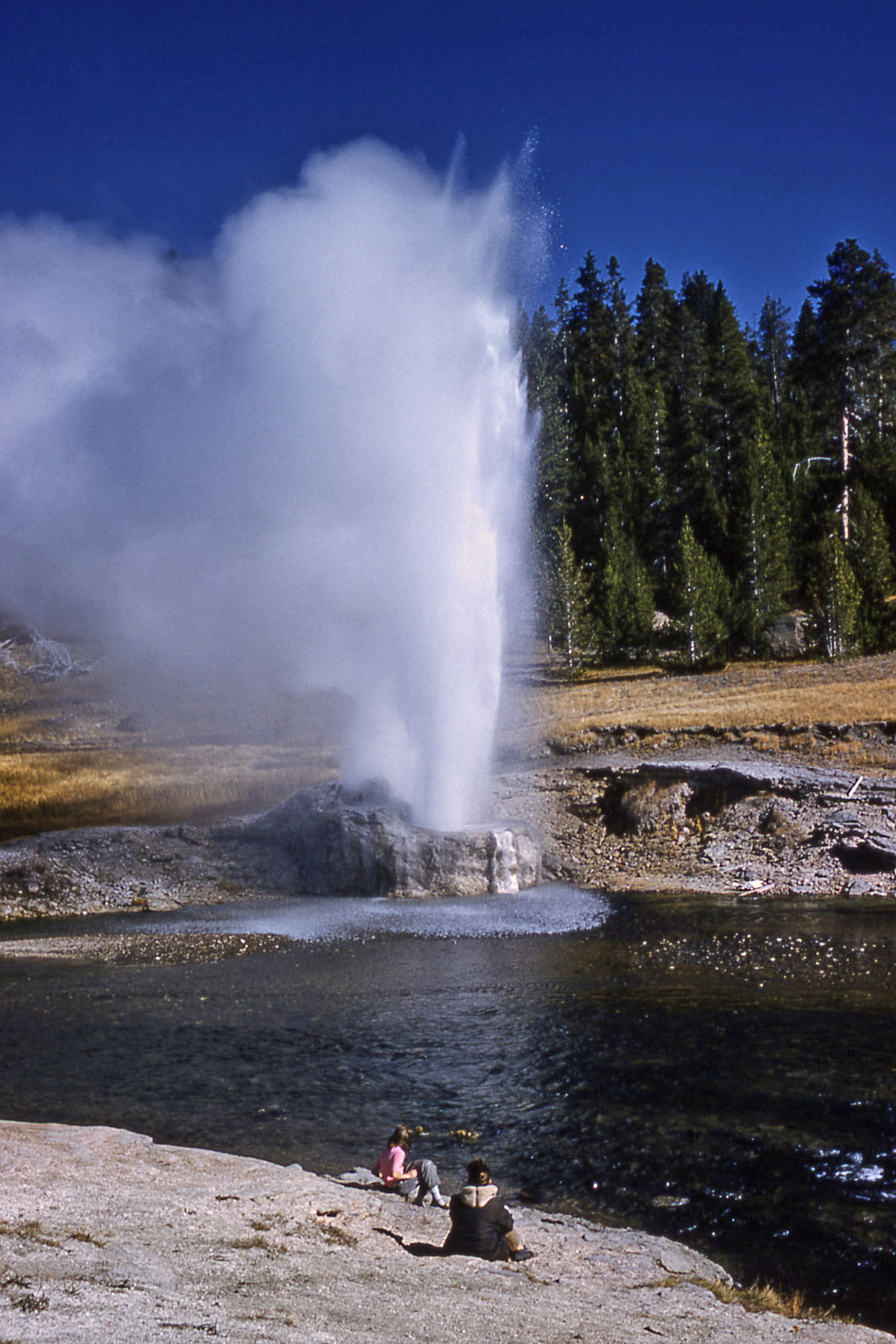
Eruption, 1959

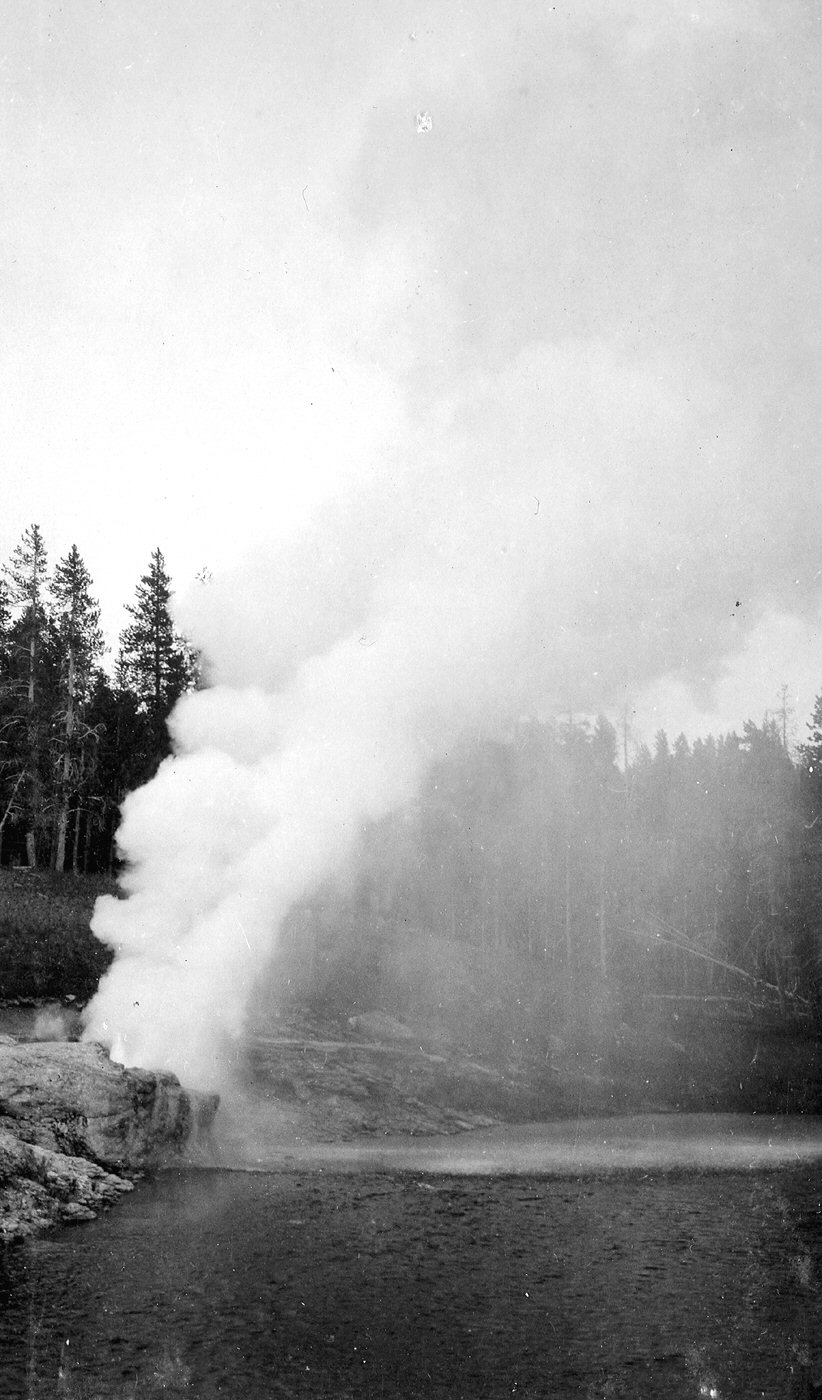
Erupting, 1922

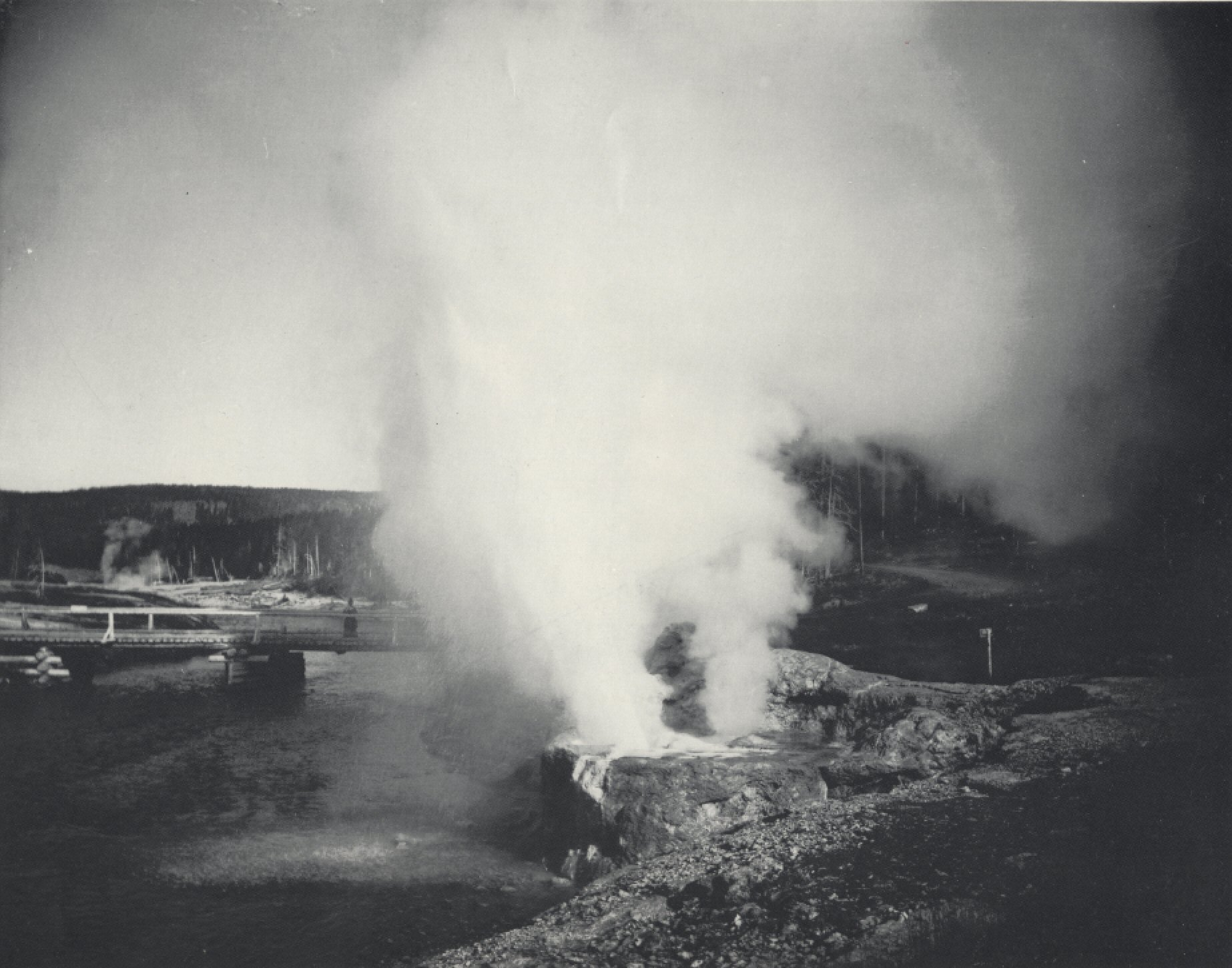
1896, photo by F. Jay Haynes
