= Yuta Orisaka =

Japanese singer-songwriter (born 1989)

Yuta Orisaka 折坂悠太
- Born: September 16, 1989 (age 36); Tottori, Japan
- Genres: J-pop
- Instruments: Guitar, vocals, piano
- Years active: 2013–present
- Website: orisakayuta.jp

Yuta Orisaka (折坂 悠太, Orisaka Yūta; born 16 September 1989) is a Japanese singer-songwriter in the J-pop, Kayōkyoku, and folk genres with influence from blues and jazz.

== Biography ==
Born in Tottori, Orisaka grew up in Russia and Iran, and then later settled in Chiba when he returned to Japan. When he went to a free school as a youth, he played drums in bands with friends of his doing covers of favorite songs of theirs. At sixteen, he eventually transitioned to playing the guitar so that he could write his own music and lyrics. With his bands he would play at local venues and festivals. He recorded his EP Akebono with friends of his at school and released it in 2014.

Orisaka started work on his first full-length album Tamuke in 2015. For the album, he tried to not write songs that came from himself but instead focused on writing songs that came from the scenery around him. Japanese-American singer Hikaru Utada said that she was shocked by his song "Asama" off of the album and listens to it often.

Orisaka's second full-length album Heisei was released in 2018. It is named after the Heisei Period in Japan which began in 1989, the same year that he was born in. The period was marked by political turmoil and an economic decline and Orisaka used themes of decline in the title track and across the album. In 2019, the album won the CD Shop Grand Prize from the CD Shop Awards in Japan.

His song "Orca" was ranked 82 on NPR's list of the best songs of 2021.

His song "Morning Glory" was used as the theme song for the Japanese television series "Medical Examiner Asagao". Another song of his, "Robin", was also used in the show.

== Discography ==
=== Albums ===
Title	Japanese title	Release date
Jumon	呪文	June 26, 2024
State of Mind	心理	October 6, 2021
Heisei	平成	October 3, 2018
Tamuke	たむけ	September 7, 2016

=== EPs ===
Title	Release date
Akebono	November 22, 2014
Zawameki	January 17, 2018
Morning Glory	March 10, 2021
