= Morning Glory, Kentucky =

Unincorporated community in Kentucky, United States

Morning Glory
- Unincorporated community
- Location within the state of Kentucky Morning Glory (the United States)
- Coordinates: 38°24′2″N 84°8′52″W
- Country: United States
- State: Kentucky
- County: Nicholas
- Elevation: 771 ft (235 m)
- Time zone: UTC-5 (Eastern (EST))
  - Summer (DST): UTC-4 (EDT)
- GNIS feature ID: 498603

Morning Glory is an unincorporated community located in Nicholas County, Kentucky, United States. Its post office closed in 1921.
