= Isato Nakagawa =

Japanese singer-songwriter and guitarist (1947–2022)

Isato Nakagawa (January 30, 1947 – April 7, 2022), was a Japanese guitarist, teacher, composer and arranger specializing in the fingerstyle technique. Nakagawa has released almost 25 albums since the beginning of his musical career. His latest album Naturally was released in 2013.

Several notable Japanese guitarists, including Kotaro Oshio and Masaaki Kishibe, are known to have been influenced by Nakagawa.

== Background ==
In 1967, Nakagawa met Nishioka Takashi. The duo formed the folk band Itsutu No Akai Fūsen (lit. Five Red Balloons). Between 1968 and 1969, they released 2 albums. However, Nakagawa subsequently left the band in 1969 due to differences in musical direction.

In 1972, Nakagawa and Ritsu Murakami got together and formed Ritsu to Murakami (lit. Ritsu and Murakami). They released one album together with predominantly American Old-time music.

For Nakagawa's omnibus album Daybreak 2, Nakagawa collaborated with young and budding guitarists in Japan. An example of how he reached out to them was narrated by GIN (who was one of the collaborators on the album) in an interview. GIN was a contestant in the Morris Fingerpicking Day competition and Nakagawa was the judge. Once the competition ended, Nakagawa reached out to GIN in the backyard inviting him to collaborate on the omnibus album.

He died on April 7, 2022, at a hospital in Tokyo due to chronic kidney disease.
