= Morning Glory (company) =

South Korean office supply company

Morning Glory (Korean: 모닝글로리) is a South Korean office supply and home goods manufacturing company. It was established in 1981 under a different name (신한교역문구센터).

It produces a variety of products, including notebooks, writing utensils, pencil cases, and home goods. It opened its first international store in Los Angeles in 1994. It had branches in New York and New Jersey by 2000 as well. The brand also exports products to other countries, including the United States and the United Kingdom. By 2014, it had locations in 20 countries in Asia, Europe, and North America. The company experienced a bankruptcy in 1998 and reorganized. In 2021, it relocated its Seoul office to the Morning Glory Building in Hongdae.

== See also ==
- Artbox – South Korean stationery and lifestyle company
