= Morning Glory Pool =

Hot spring in Teton County, Wyoming, USA

- Morning Glory Spring
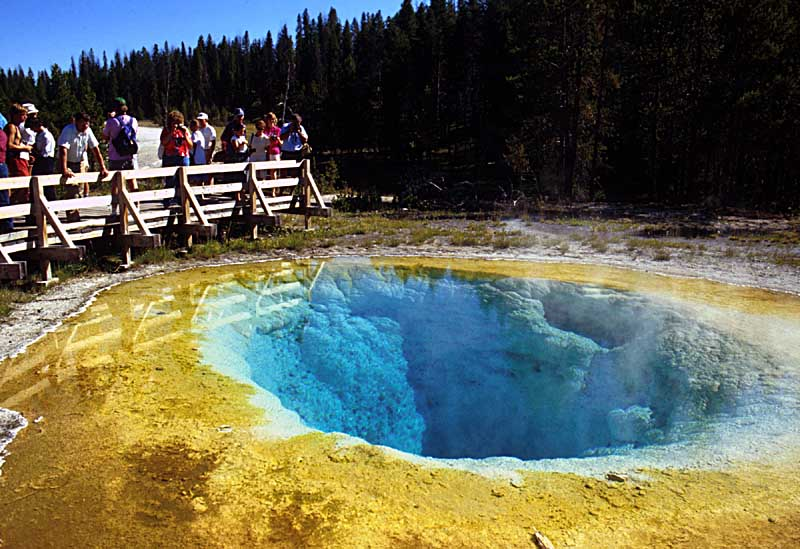

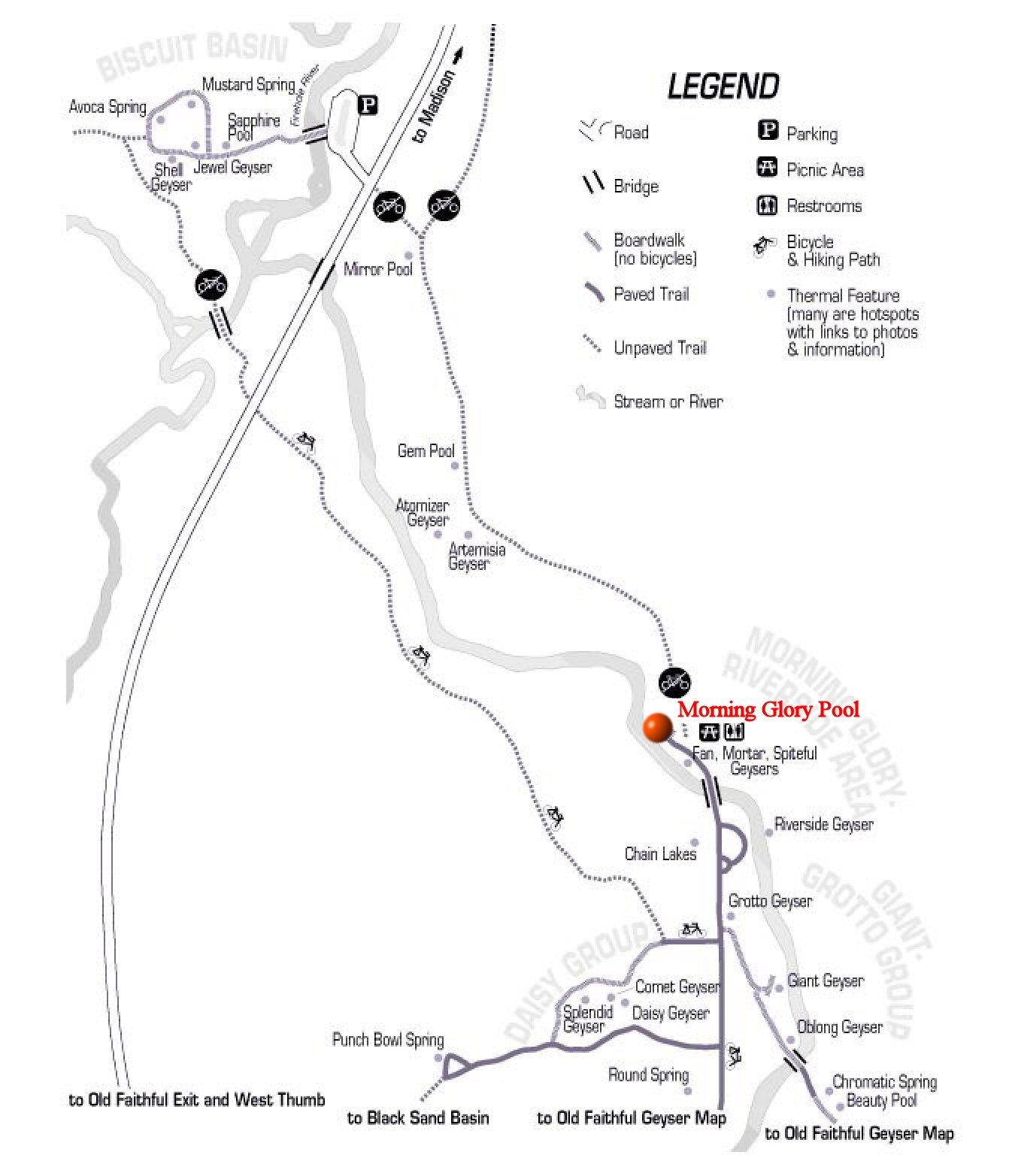
- Northern section of Upper Geyser Basin
- Name origin: Named by Mrs. E. N. McGowan, wife of Assistant Superintendent Charles McGowan, 1883
- Location: Yellowstone National Park, Teton County, Wyoming, USA
- Coordinates: 44.4750325°N 110.8435128°W
- Elevation: 7,300 feet (2,225 m)
- Type: Hot spring
- Temperature: 69.8 °C (157.6 °F)
- Depth: 23 feet (7 m)

Morning Glory Pool is a hot spring in the Yellowstone Upper Geyser Basin of the United States. The spring is also known by the name Morning Glory Spring.

== History ==
The pool was named by Mrs E. N. McGowan, wife of Assistant Park Superintendent, Charles McGowan in 1883. She called it "Convolutus", the Latin name for the morning glory flower, which the spring resembles. By 1889, the name Morning Glory Pool had become common usage in the park. The feature has also been known as Morning Glory Spring.

== Composition ==
The distinct color of the pool is due to bacteria which inhabit the water. On a few rare occasions the Morning Glory Pool has erupted as a geyser, usually following an earthquake or other nearby seismic activity.

Several entryways have been clogged due to objects being thrown in by tourists, reducing the hot water supply, and in turn altering the overall appearance of the pool. Several attempts by park officials to artificially induce eruptions to clear the pool of debris and clear blocked entryways have been met with mixed results. An interpretive sign, placed near the pool by the park service, discusses the damage caused by ignorance and vandalism and suggests that Morning Glory is becoming a "Faded Glory."

== Gallery ==
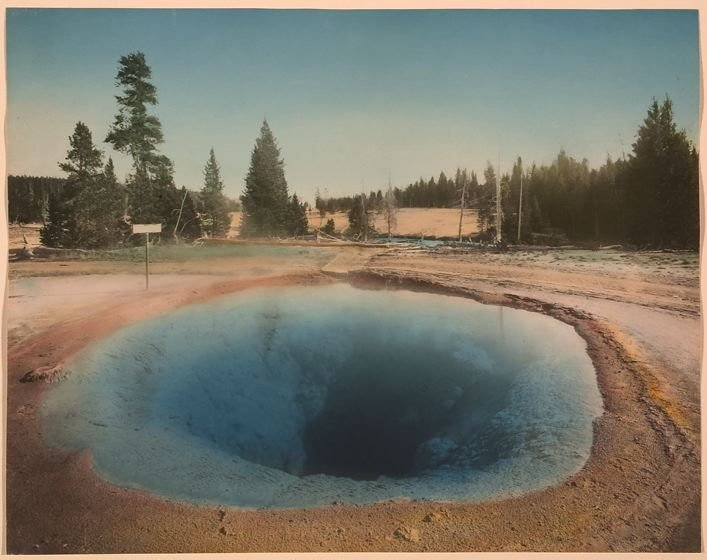
Frank Jay Haynes, c. 1890

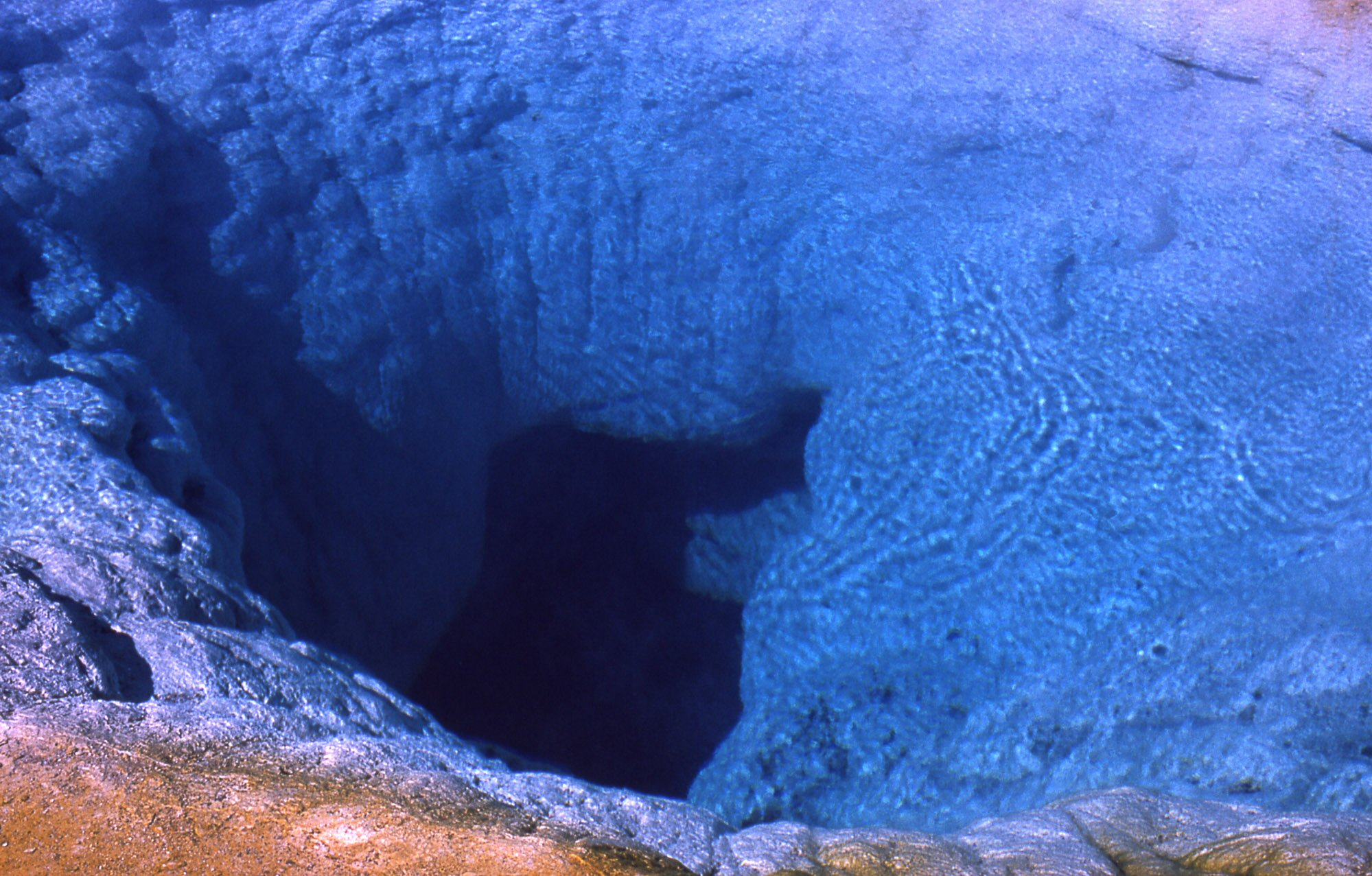
1966

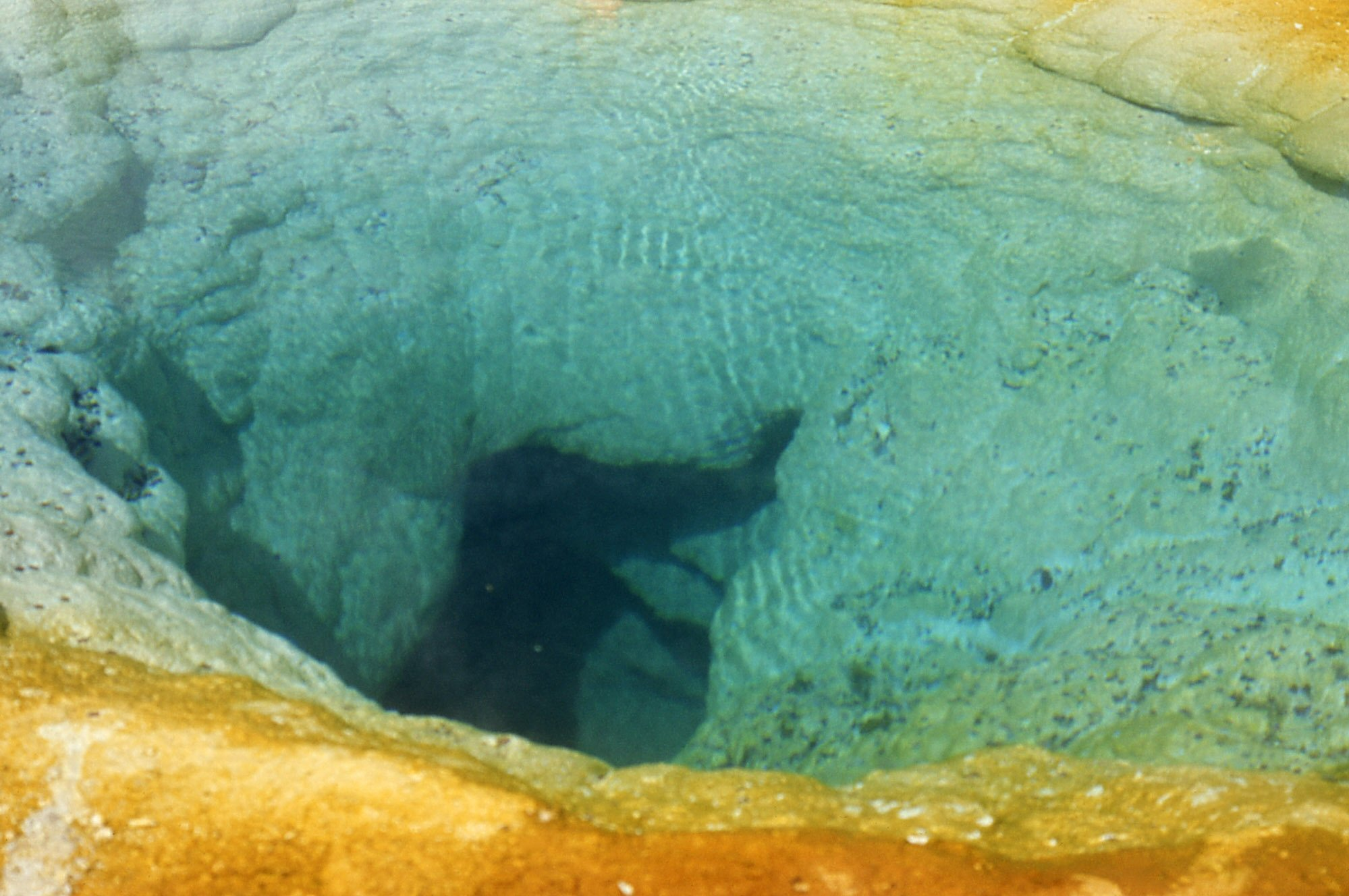
1970

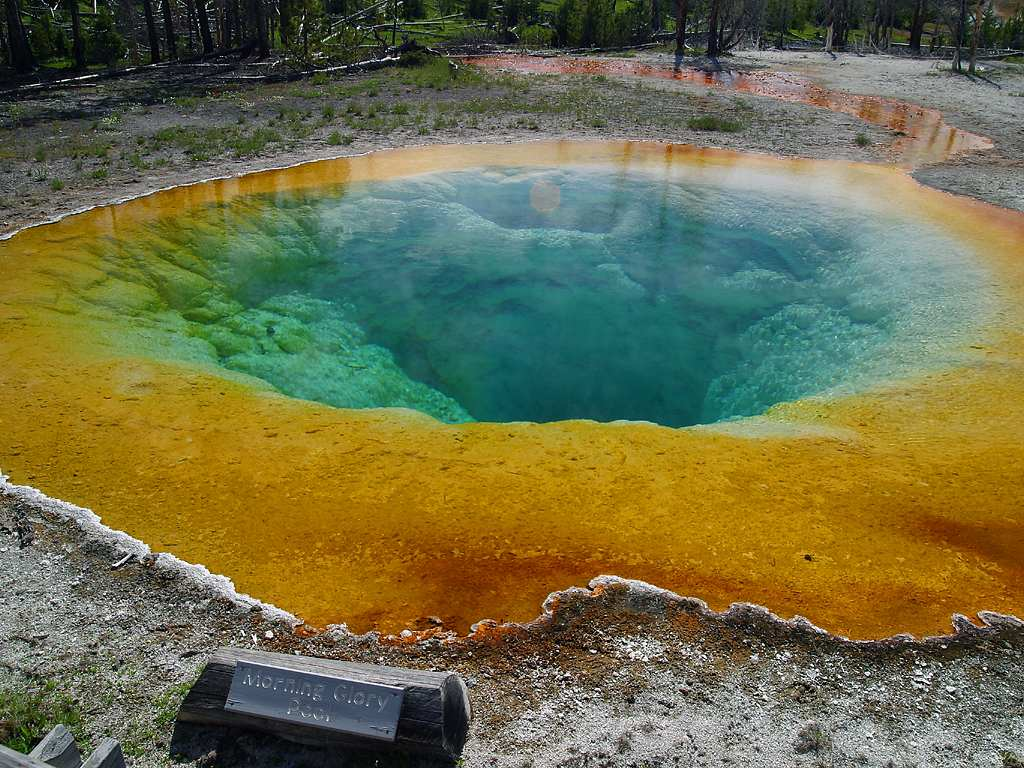
2005

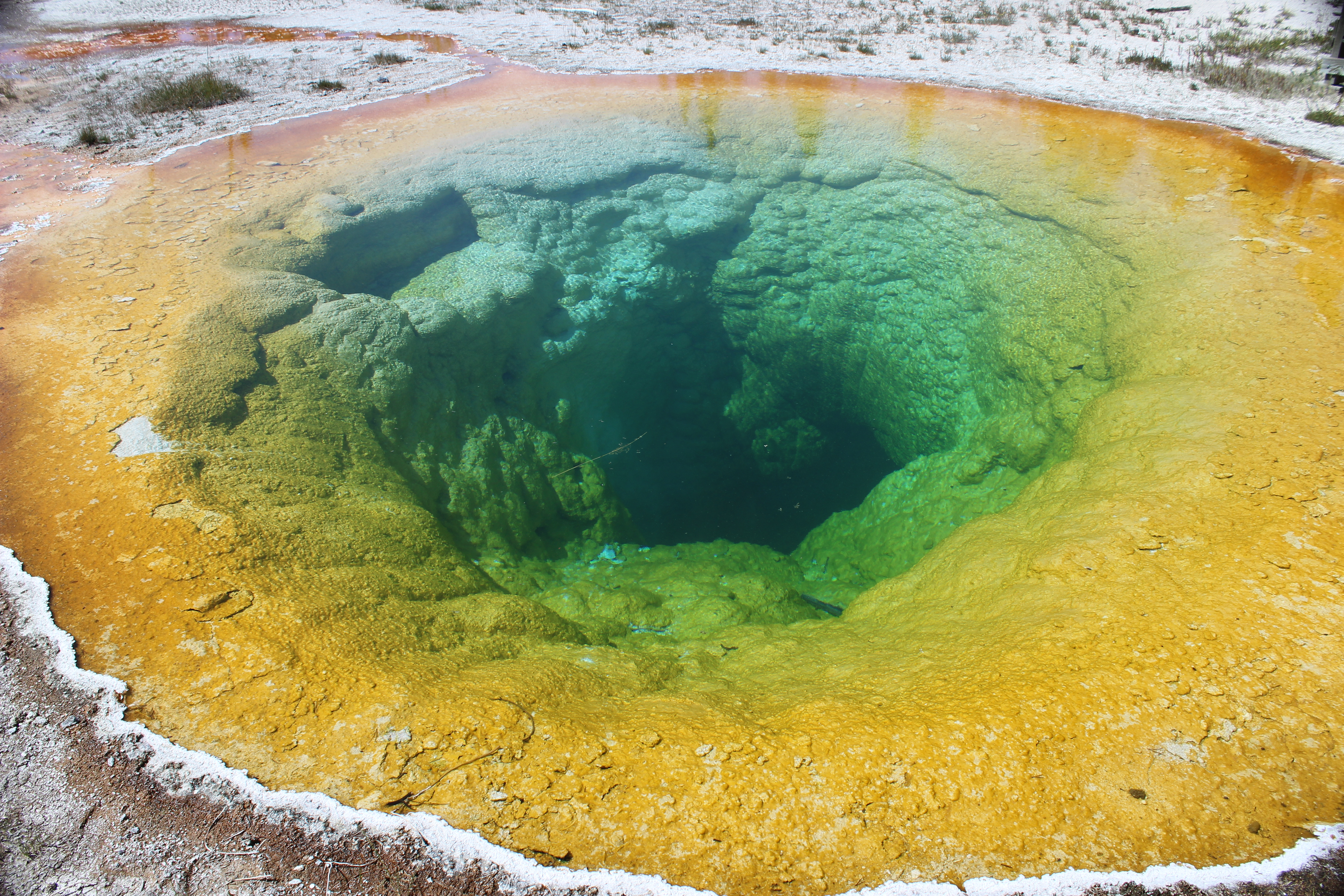
2014

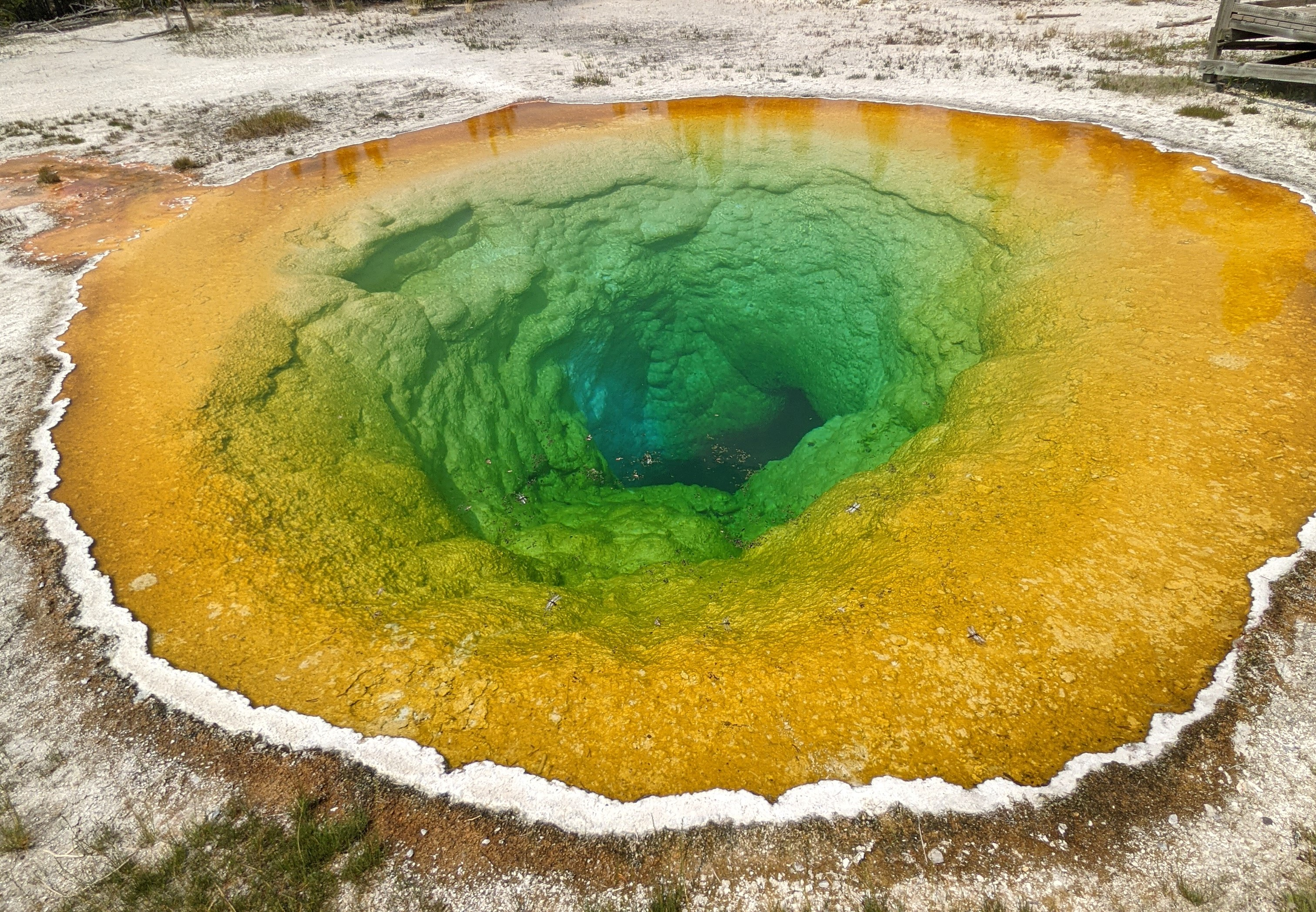
2021

== See also ==
List of hot springs in the United States
