= Colin Scott =

Colin Scott may refer to:

- Colin Scott (footballer) (born 1970), Scottish goalkeeper
- Colin Scott (rugby league) (born 1960), Australian rugby league footballer
- Colin Scott (cricketer) (1919–1992), English cricketer
- Colin Scott (bishop) (born 1933), Bishop of Hulme
- Colin Scott (died 2016), American man who died after falling into a thermal hot spring at Yellowstone

== See also ==
- Colin Scot (1941–1999), British singer-songwriter
