= List of deaths in Yellowstone National Park =

This is a list of deaths that have occurred within the boundaries of Yellowstone National Park since its establishment in 1872.

== Military deaths ==
The U.S. Army administered Yellowstone from 1886 to 1917 from the park headquarters at Fort Yellowstone. During the Army’s tenure, at least 14 soldiers died in the park.

Date	Victim	Circumstances
1891	Private James Pruitt	Died from a horse kick
1893	Private Andrew Preiber	Froze to death while on winter patrol
1893	Private Ellis Lingard	Horse wreck
1894	Lieutenant Lunsford Daniel	Runaway horse
1897	Private John W.H. Davis	Froze to death on winter patrol
1898	Private Harry P. Donaldson	Drowning
1904	Private Richard R. Hurley	Froze to death on winter patrol
1906	Private Harry B. Allen	Drowning
1908	Private Presley H. Vance	Froze to death on winter patrol
1910	Private Frank F. Monaghan	Drowning
1912	Private Frank Cunningham	Self-defense shooting
1916	Lieutenant Joseph McDonald	Avalanche
1918	Sergeant Arthur S. Brewer	Drowning
1918	Private Victor Manterfield	Drowning

== Bear attacks ==
Date	Victim	Circumstances
September 8, 1916	Frank Welch	Killed by a bear at a camp near Sylvan Pass. He was carrying hay and oats when attacked; other campers later killed the bear with a dynamite trap.
August 23, 1942	Martha Hansen	Mauled to death by a bear in the Old Faithful area. Hansen had left her cabin to go to an outdoor restroom at night, surprised a bear around a corner, and was attacked. Hansen succumbed to her injuries four days later in a hospital.
June 24-25, 1972	Harry Eugene Walker	Mauled and partially consumed by a grizzly bear after he camped illegally in the backcountry. Walker's death led to a high-profile wrongful death trial.
July 30, 1984	Brigitta Fredenhagen	Dragged from her tent during the night and killed at a backcountry campsite at the southern end of White Lake. Park investigations concluded the grizzly was likely food-conditioned.
October 5, 1986	William Tesinsky	Mauled to death and partly eaten by a grizzly bear in the Otter Creek area of Hayden Valley. Tesinsky had approached the bear too closely while trying to take photos. The bear was later shot and killed by park rangers.
July 6, 2011	Brian Matayoshi	Attacked and killed by a female grizzly with cubs on the Wapiti Lake Trail near Canyon Village.
August 24, 2011	John Wallace	Body was found along the Mary Mountain Trail after hiking alone. An autopsy confirmed he died from a bear attack.
August 7, 2015	Lance Crosby	Killed by a grizzly bear in an off-trail area near Elephant Back Loop Trail

== Bison incidents ==
Date	Victim	Circumstances
March 22, 1902	Dick Rock	Poacher gored near Henry's Lake 29 times by captive bison.
July 31, 1983	Alain Jean Jacques Dumont	Gored by a solitary bull while taking a photo about six feet away from the animal, died in the hospital September 2.

== Thermal pool accidents ==
Date	Victim	Circumstances
July 1890	James Joseph Stumbo	Fell into a hot spring during a family excursion and died.
September 1905	Fannie Weeks	Fell into a hot spring near Old Faithful and died a month later from her injuries.
July 8, 1919	Jame Baxter Hughes	4-year-old boy from Gueydan, Louisiana, fell into hot spring at West Thumb Geyser Basin.
August 15, 1927	Rollo Fallagher	Fell into a hot spring near Firehole Lake and sustained injuries, was recommended to seek medical care nearby but chose to drive to Salt Lake City, where he later died.
July 5, 1929	Georges Landoy	Visiting from Belgium when he fell into a hot spring near Grand Geyser.
June 28, 1970	Andrew Clark Hecht	Fell into Crested Pool spring and died. The Andrew Clark Hecht Memorial Public Safety Achievement Award was created in his memory, and is annually given to the individual or group who contributes the most in public safety. The recipient also receives $1,000.
July 20, 1981	David Allen Kirwan	Died after diving into Celestine Pool in an attempt to save a friend's dog, which had fallen into the waters, which have an average temperature of 183.4 °F (84.1 °C). Kirwin (age 24) was severely burned and blinded, but survived until the next day when he died at a Salt Lake City hospital. After being removed from the pool, he was reported to have said: "That was stupid. How bad am I? That was a stupid thing I did."
August 21, 2000	Sara Hulphers	Concessions employee who accidentally fell into a hot spring while walking in the park before dawn. Her friends who fell in with her survived with extensive burns.
June 7, 2016	Colin Scott	Died after slipping into a thermal pool while exploring a prohibited area of the park with his sister. Reports indicate that they intended to partake in "hot potting," the prohibited activity of bathing in Yellowstone's thermal pools.
July 31, 2022	Il Hun Ro	70-year-old man died after entering Abyss Pool (West Thumb Geyser Basin); part of his foot in a shoe was found floating in August 2022.

== Falls from heights ==
Date	Victim	Circumstances
June 17, 2006	Deborah Chamberlin	Stepped over a retaining wall to take a photograph and fell 500 ft to her death.
September 28, 2007	Charlotte Harrison	Slipped from the Calcite Springs overlook and fell 400–500 ft into the canyon while taking photos.
August 26, 2016	Estefania Liset Mosquera Alcivar	Park concessions employee fell ~400 ft from Grandview Point into the canyon while socializing with co-workers.
June 7-8, 2017	Jeff Murphy	Fell ~500 ft from Turkey Pen Peak (near Rescue Creek Trail) while hiking alone searching for the Forrest Fenn treasure.

== Hiking accidents ==
Date	Victim	Circumstances
July 16, 2013	Joseph Austin Parker	23-year-old from Valdosta, Georgia, was hiking alone on Electric Peak. Fell 300 ft. and was found dead at the bottom of a scree cliff.
On or after September 17, 2024	Austin King	22-year-old who disappeared after a 7-day solo camping expedition around Eagle Peak. He reached the summit and left a note in the registry book dated September 17, 2024, detailing severe weather and numbness in his fingers. He is believed to be dead after no evidence of his remains or whereabouts was found after extensive searches, but his ultimate fate is uncertain.
