= Castle Geyser =

Geyser in Yellowstone National Park, Wyoming

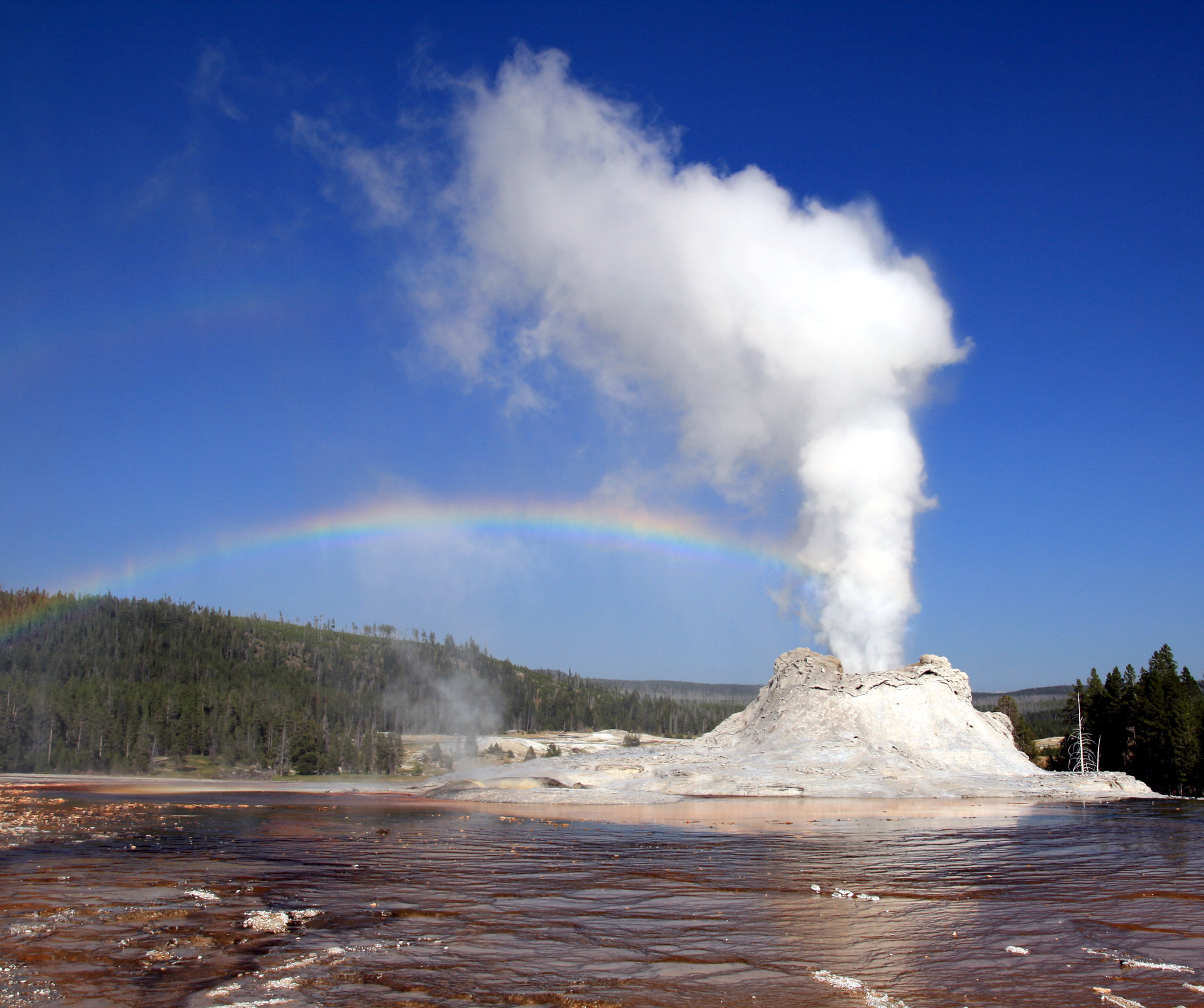
- Steam phase of Castle Geyser

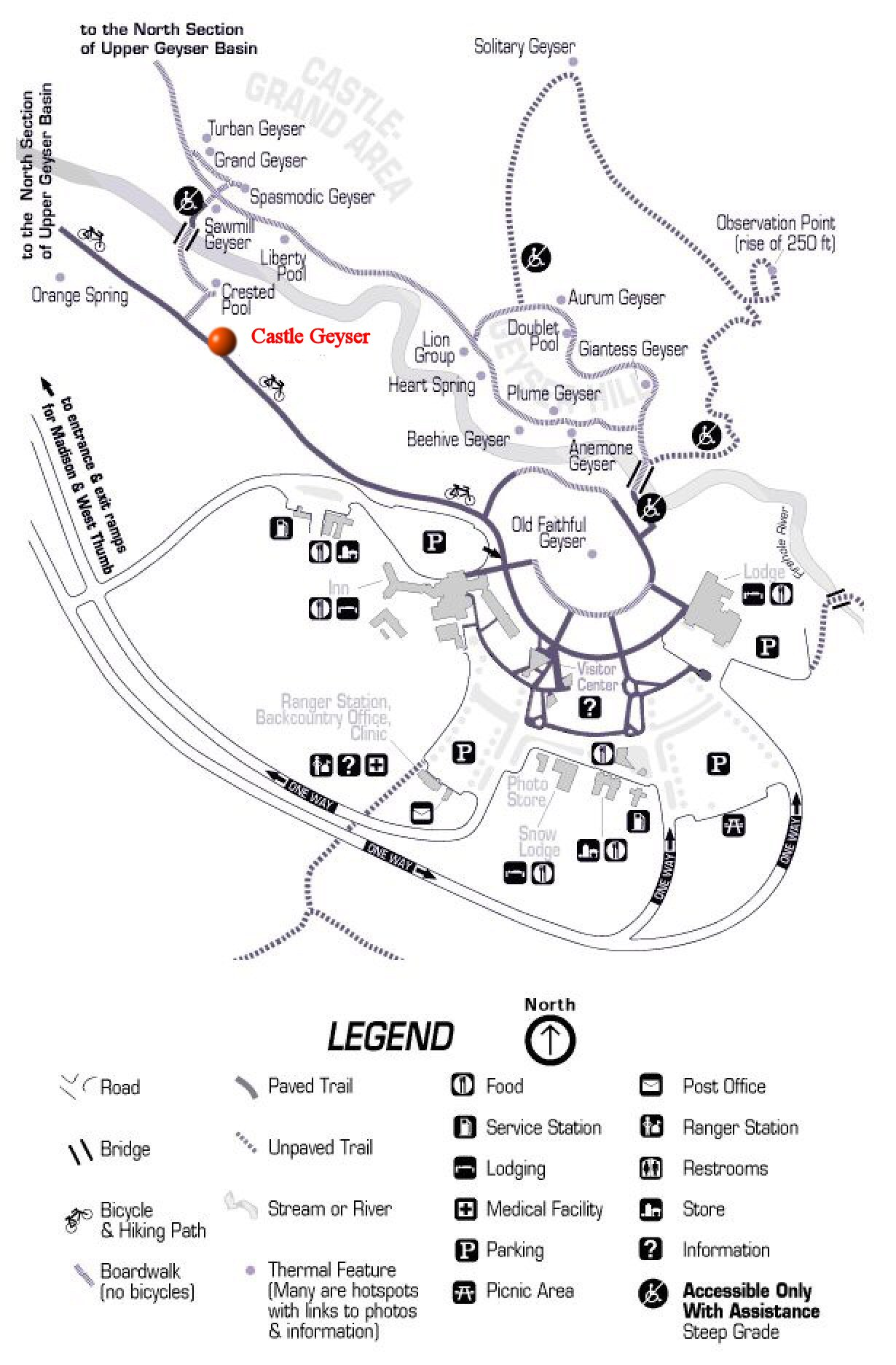
- Southern section of Upper Geyser Basin
- Name origin: Named on September 18, 1870 by members of the Washburn-Langford-Doane Expedition
- Location: Upper Geyser Basin, Yellowstone National Park, Teton County, Wyoming
- Coordinates: 44°27′48″N 110°50′12″W
- Elevation: 7,333 feet (2,235 m)
- Type: Cone geyser
- Eruption height: 90 feet (27 m)
- Frequency: 15 to 17 hours
- Duration: 20 minutes

Castle Geyser is a cone geyser in the Upper Geyser Basin of Yellowstone National Park. It is noted for the particularly large geyserite sinter deposits, which form its cone. These deposits have been likened in appearance to a castle.

When the geyser was given this name in 1870, the top edges of the structure resembled the typical profile associated with the modern concept of a castle, having the appearance of a large keep, multiple turrets, and especially because of the crenellation along the top edges of what resembled its towers. As the drawing below shows the cone had distinctive appearance at the time. Over time the cone's shape changes because of the layers of mineral deposited in successive eruptions.

== History ==
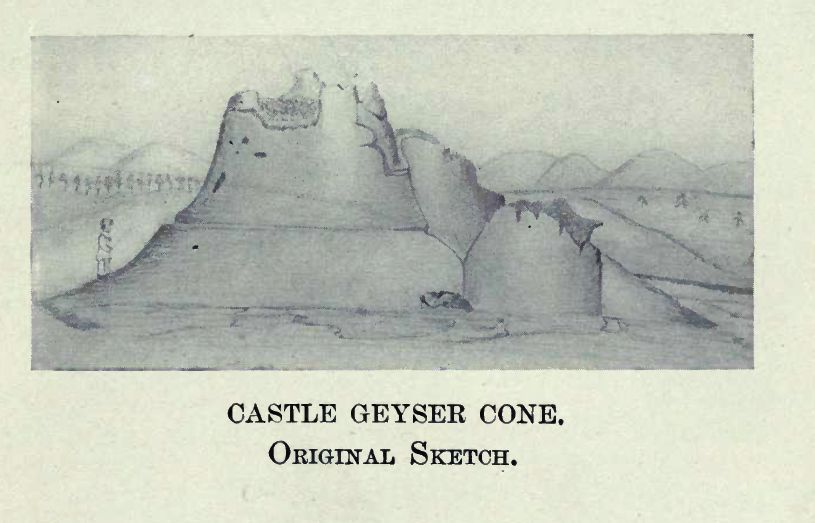
Sketch of Castle Geyser by the Washburn Expedition.

On September 18, 1870, the Washburn-Langford-Doane Expedition entered the Upper Geyser Basin. Eventually, members of the expedition named seven geysers they observed in the basin. The appearance of this geyser led Lieutenant Gustavus Cheyney Doane to name it Castle Geyser. Nathaniel P. Langford gave this account in his 1871 Scribner's article:

"The Castle," situated on the summit of an incrusted mound, has a turreted crater through which a large volume of water is expelled at intervals of two or three hours to the height of 50 feet (15 m), from a discharging orifice about three feet (0.91 m) in diameter. The architectural features of the silicious sinter surrounding it, which is very massive and compact, indicating that at some former period the flow of water must have been much greater than at present, suggested its name. A vent near it is constantly discharging a large stream of boiling water, and when the geyser is in action the water in this vent boils and bubbles with great fierceness.

== Eruption ==
The Castle Geyser has a 16- to 17-hour eruption cycle. The geyser erupts hot water for about 20 minutes in a vertical column that reaches a height of 90 ft (27 m) before changing to a noisy steam phase that issues for 30 to 40 minutes.

The sinter cone for Castle Geyser has been dated to around 1022 using carbon-14 dating. This date is much younger than the originally-presumed age of 5,000 to 15,000 years. A 3-D laser scan made of the cone reveals evidence that this geyser has evolved through four to five distinct stages to reach its current configuration.

In November 2002, the Denali earthquake in Denali National Park and Preserve, Alaska caused Castle Geyser, as well as other geysers in Yellowstone, to decrease in eruption frequency. The affected geysers have returned to their previous pattern since that time, however.

== Gallery ==
Castle Geyser erupting, 2019.

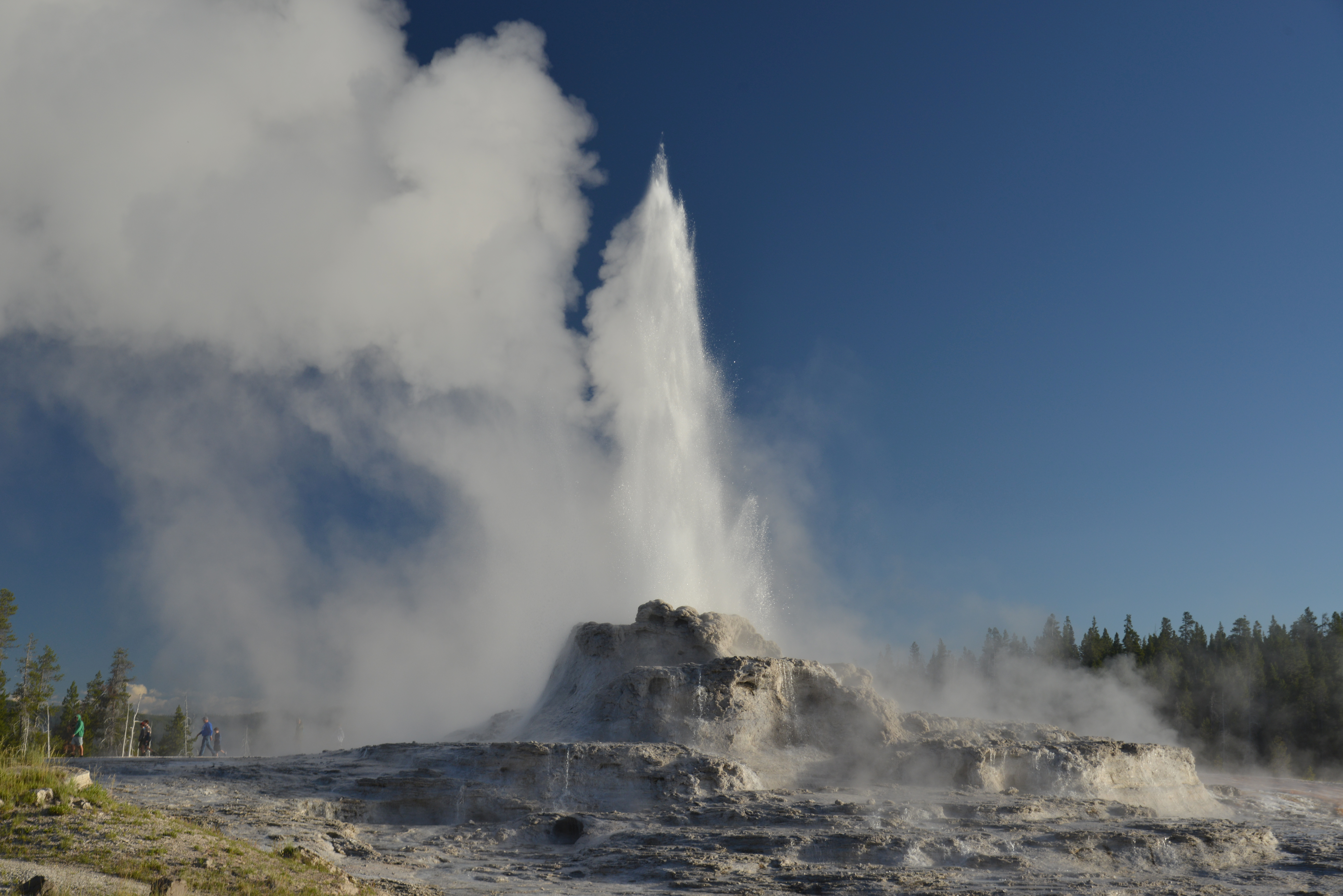
Castle Geyser erupting, 2019.

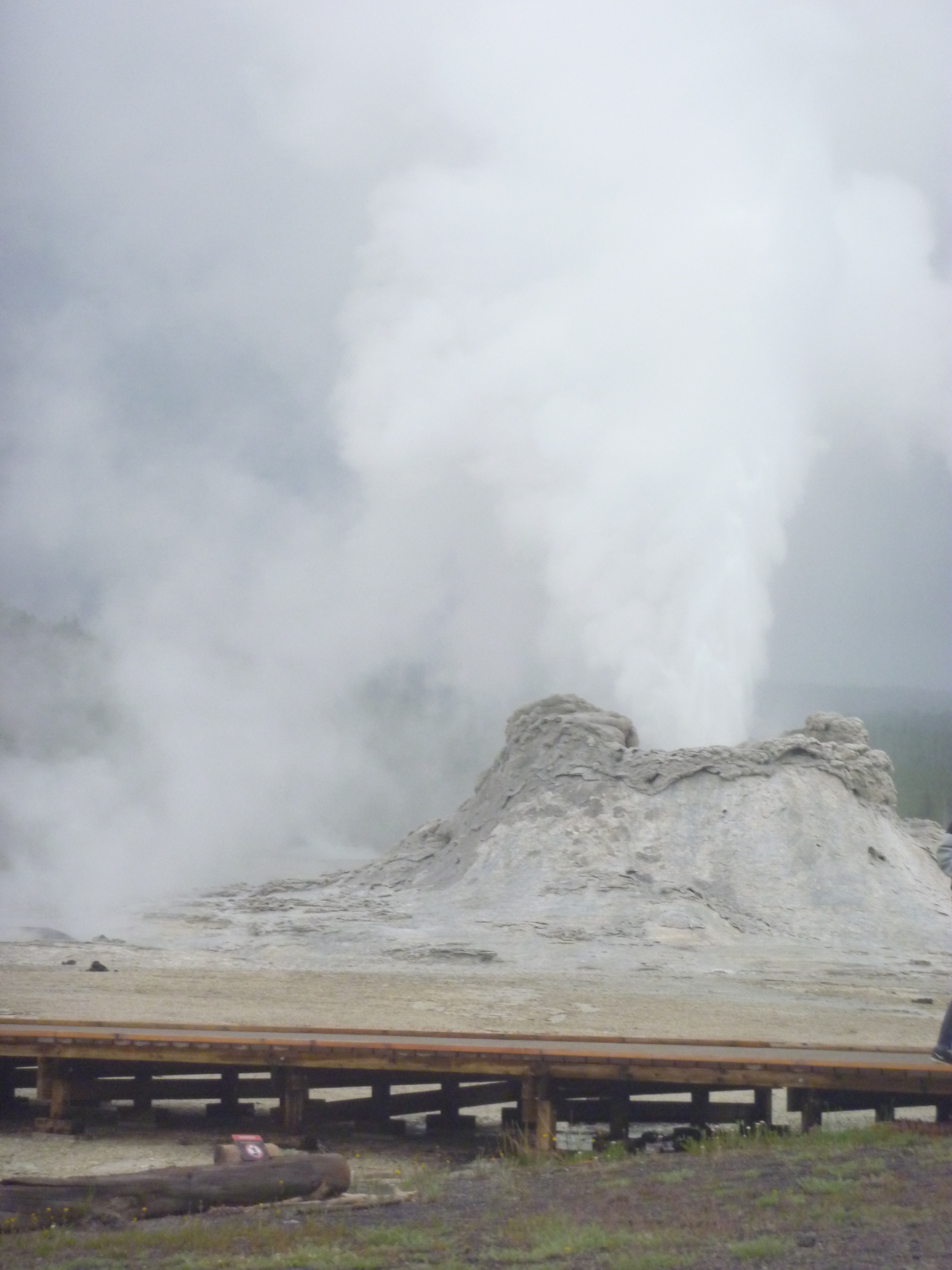
Castle Geyser erupting, 2017.

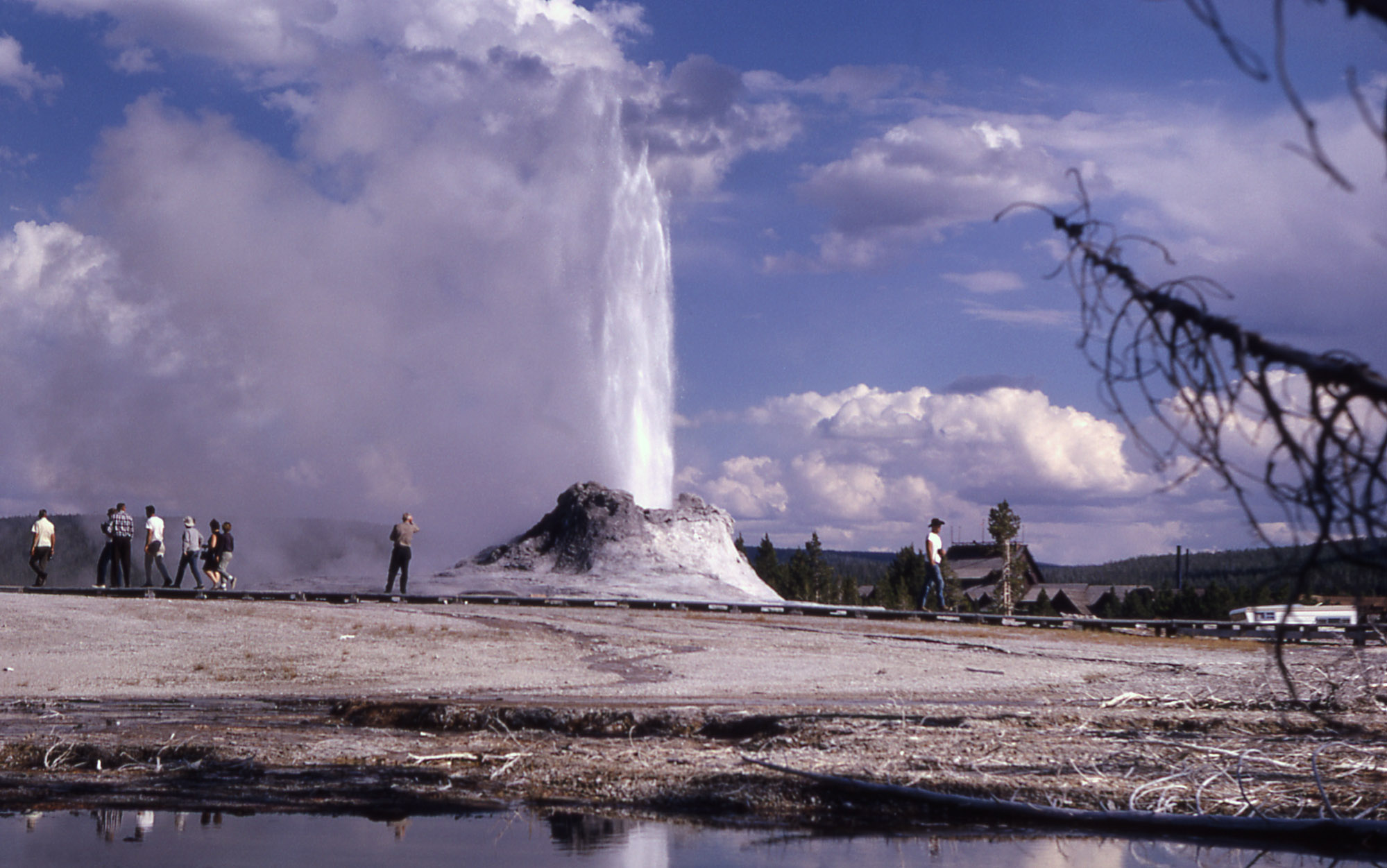
c. 1952

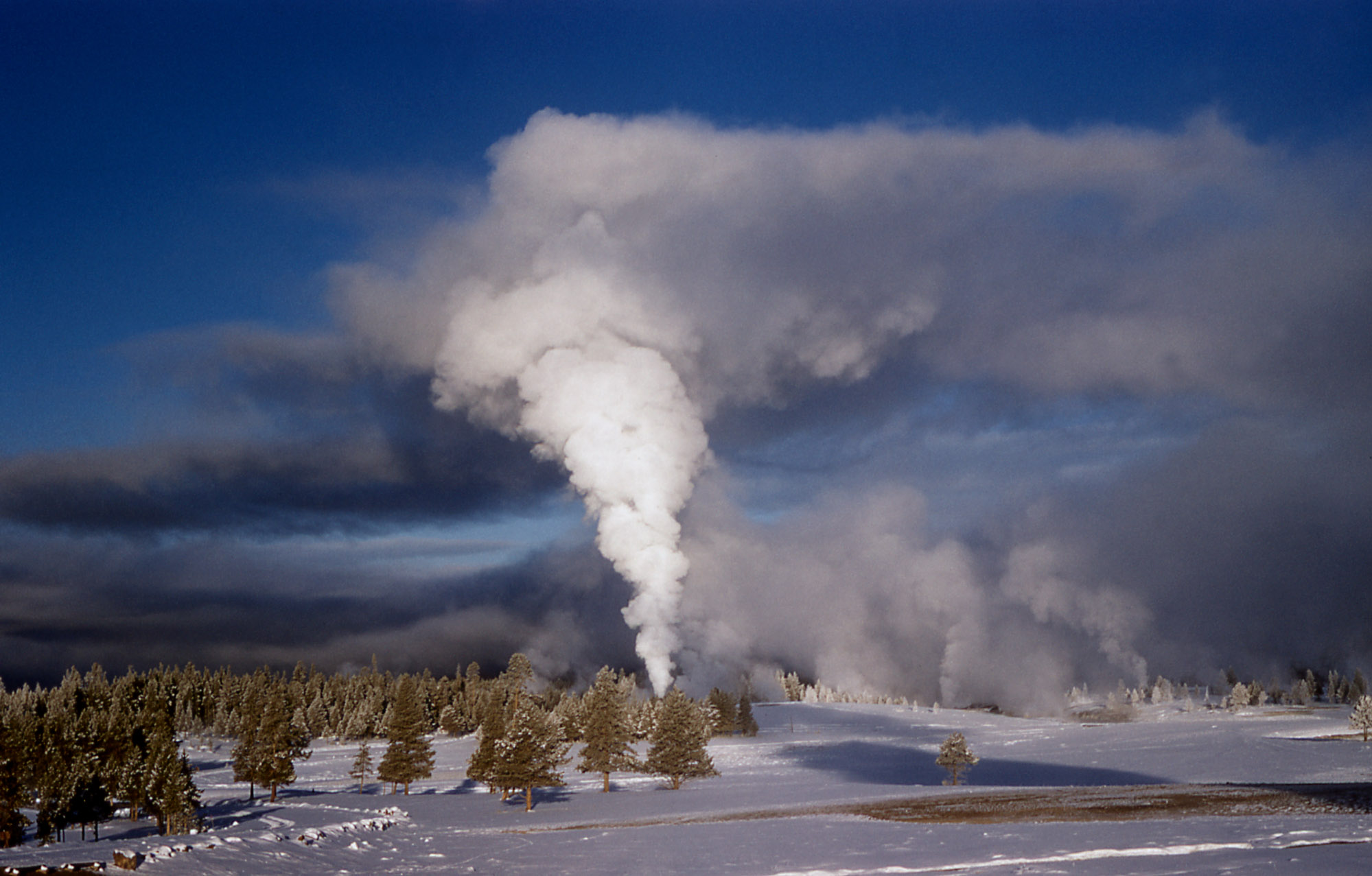
Steam phase in winter, 1961.

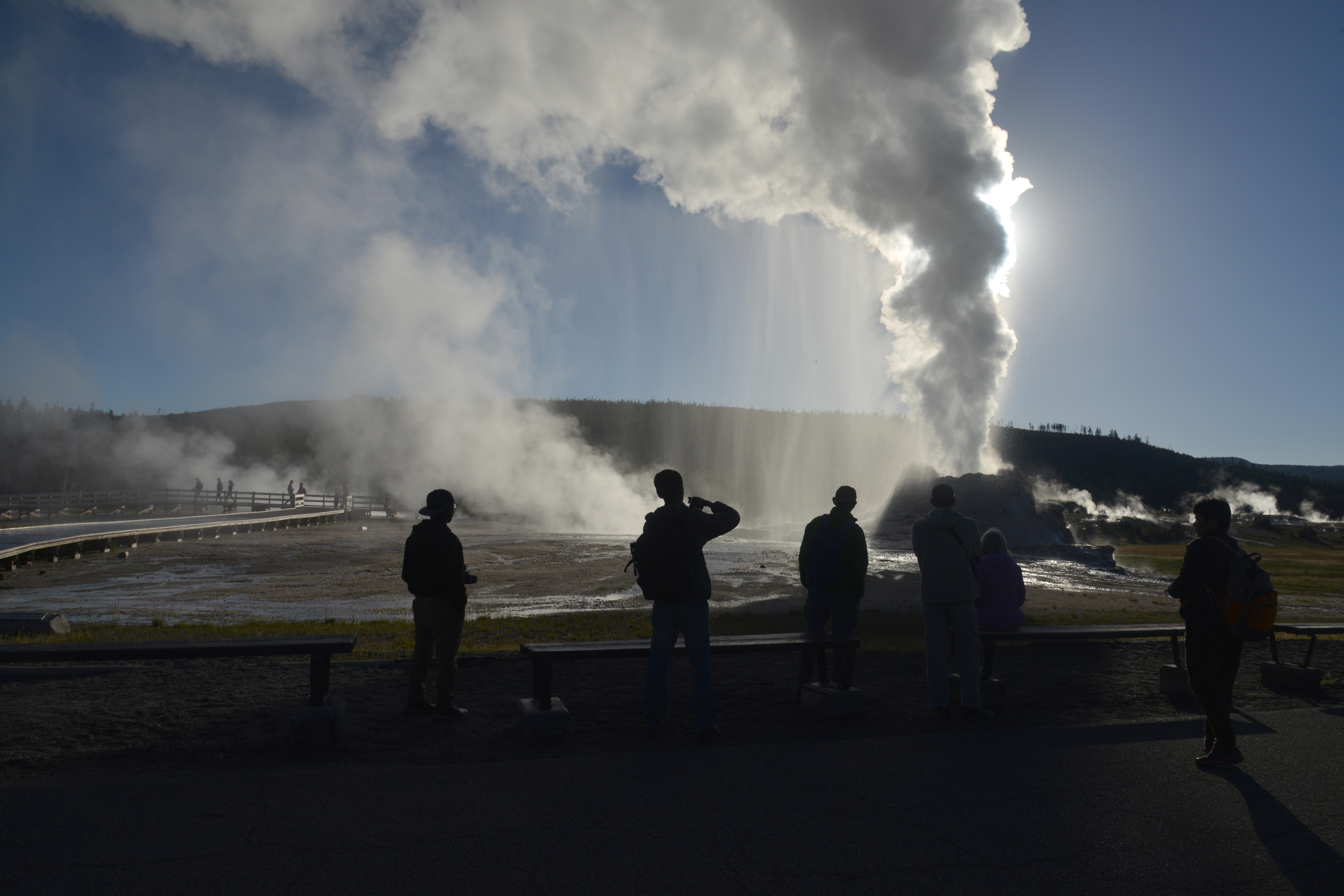
The sun behind Castle Geyser, 2019.

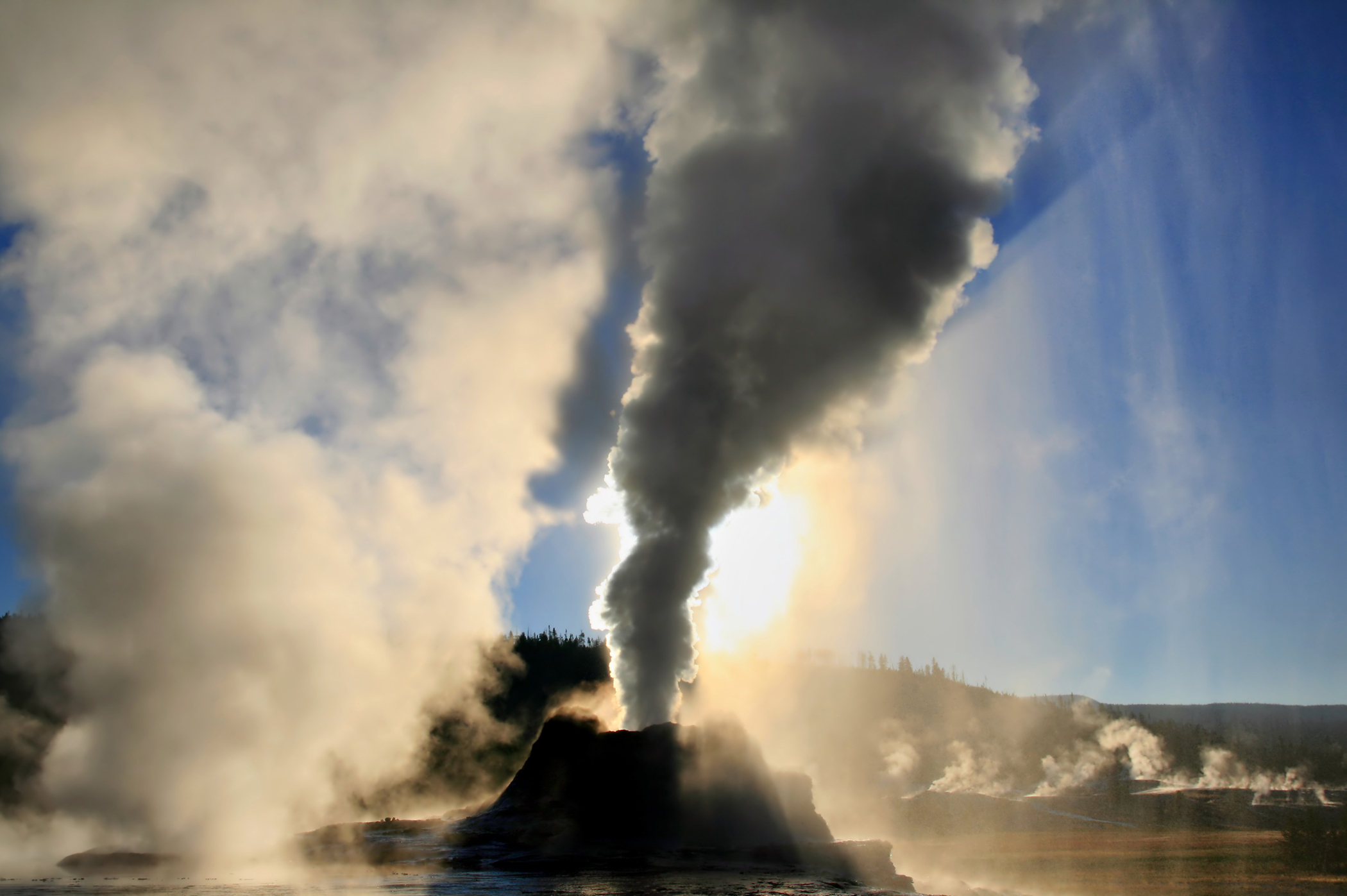
Steam phase eruption. Crepuscular rays are also seen, 2008.

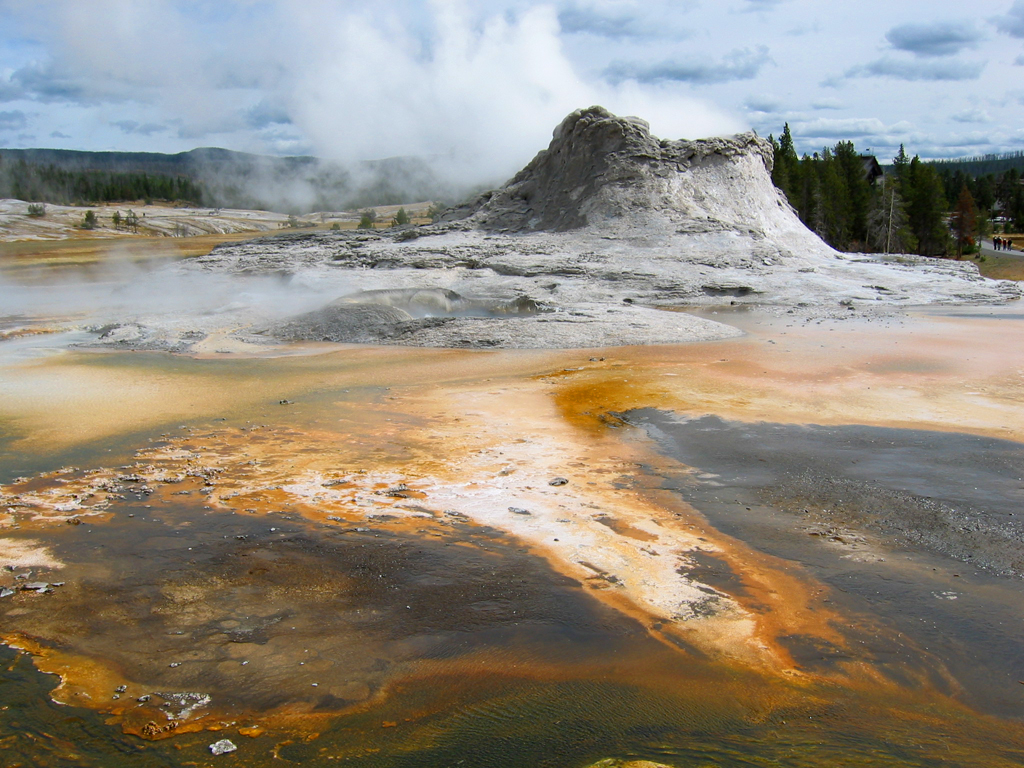
2005

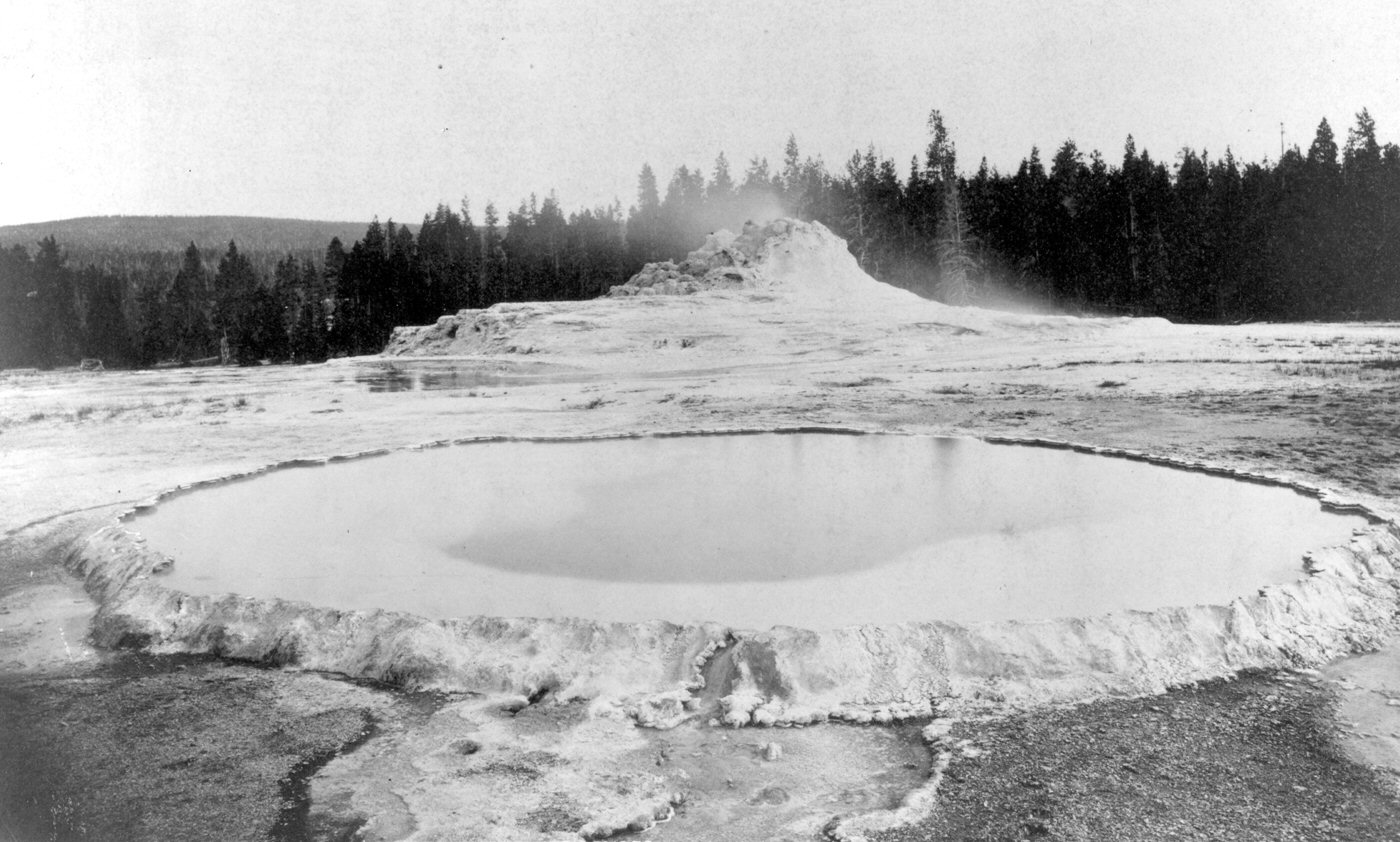
William Henry Jackson, 1872. Crested Pool is in the foreground.

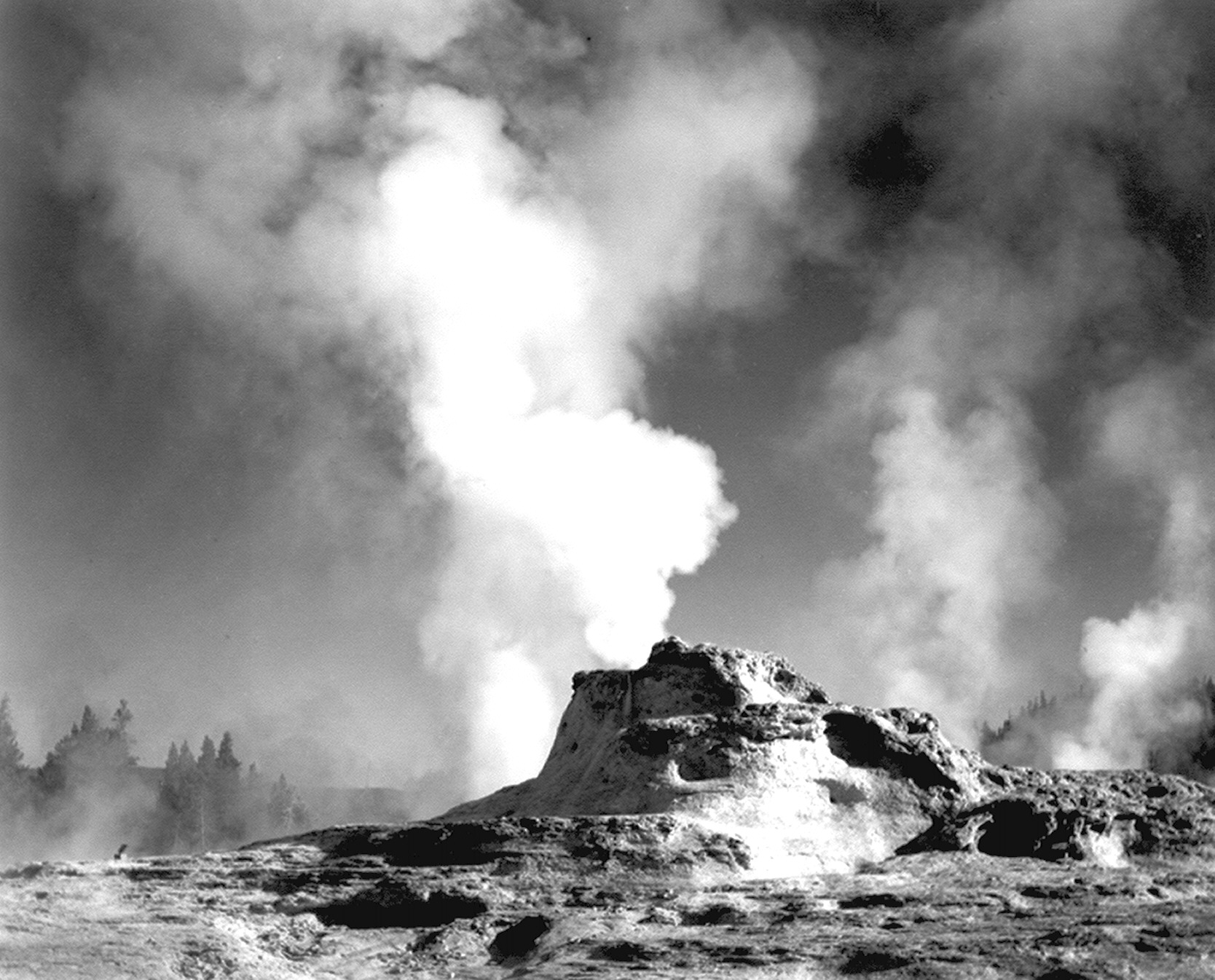
Ansel Adams, 1942.

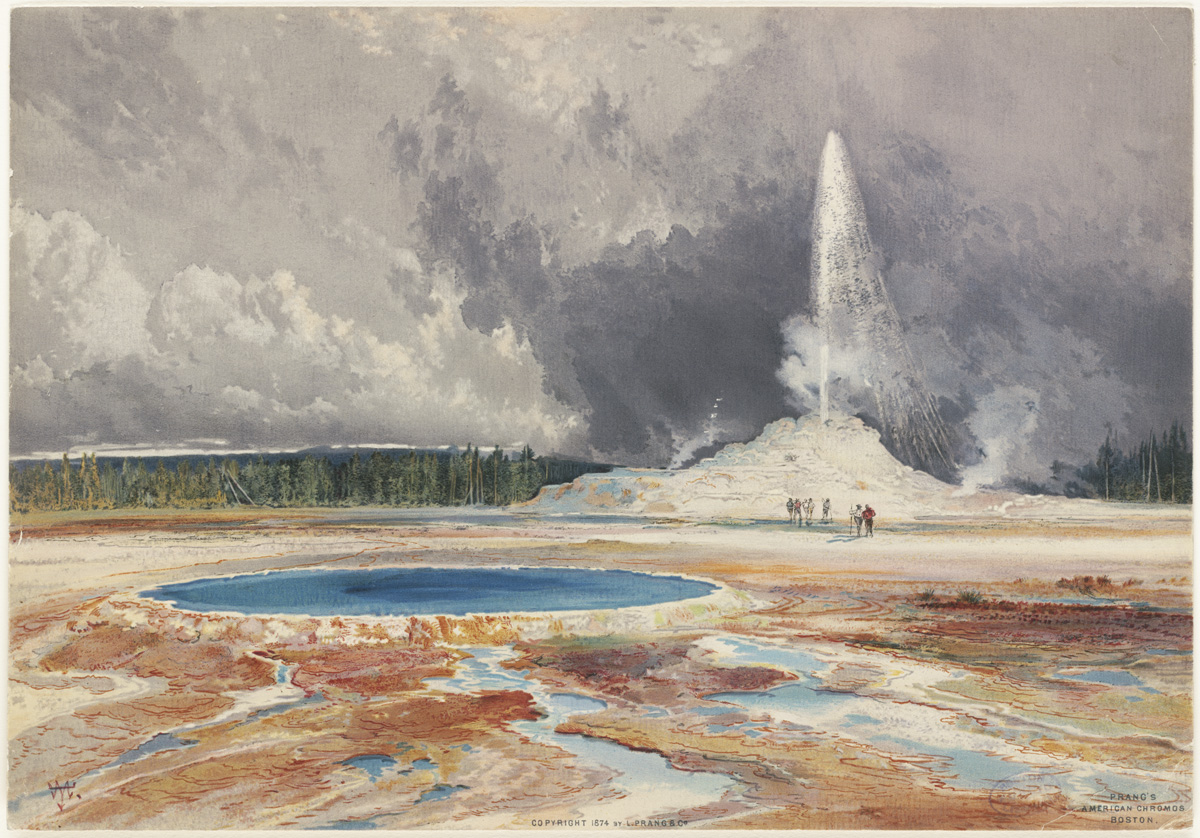
Color lithograph by Thomas Moran, 1874.

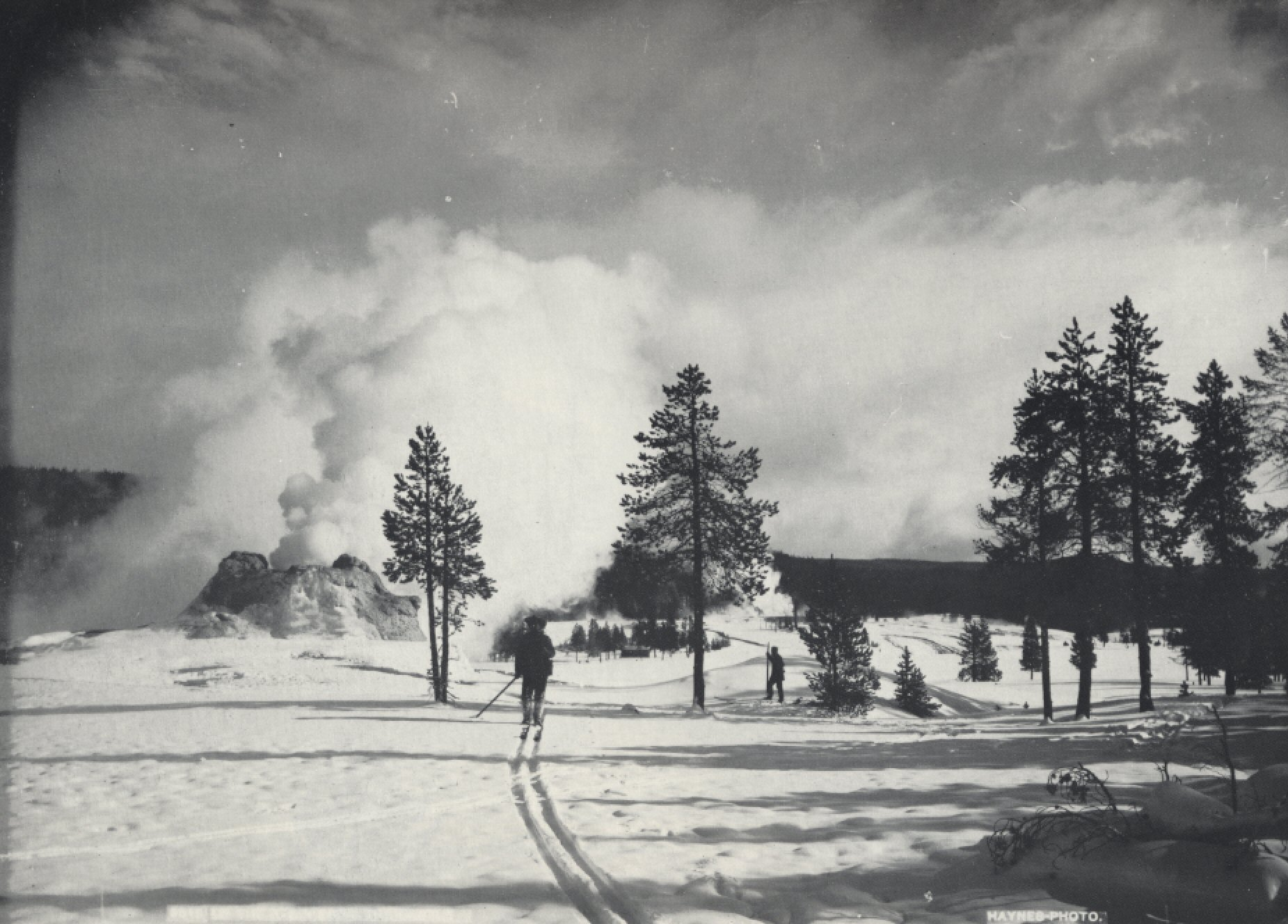
January 1887, F. Jay Haynes.
