= Death of Colin Scott =

2016 accident in Yellowstone National Park

On June 7, 2016, Colin Nathaniel Scott, a 23-year-old American man from Portland, Oregon, died after falling into a thermal hot spring in Yellowstone National Park. The accident occurred in the Norris Geyser Basin, an area known for its geothermal features, including acidic and high-temperature hot springs. Scott and his sister, Sable Scott, had deviated from the designated boardwalk area and entered a restricted section of the park. Reports indicate that they intended to partake in "hot potting," the prohibited activity of bathing in Yellowstone's thermal pools.

== Background ==
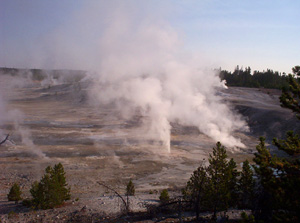
Norris Geyser Basin

Scott had recently graduated from Pacific University in Oregon and was traveling to Yellowstone National Park with his sister. He was a top student in his program. He had worked at Jackson Bottom Wetlands Preserve in Oregon. He had planned to enter a doctoral program at Portland State University.

After parking near the Norris Geyser Basin, the pair entered the prohibited area and walked 225 feet away from the prescribed boardwalk route. Yellowstone National Park regulations prohibit leaving designated paths in geothermal areas due to the extreme temperatures and acidity of the hot springs. Park officials stated that hot springs are a leading natural cause of injury or death in Yellowstone, with at least 22 recorded fatalities between 1890 and 2016.

== Accident ==
According to park reports, Sable Scott filmed their journey as they walked several hundred feet off the boardwalk. When they reached a thermal pool, Colin Scott knelt down to check the water temperature but slipped and fell in. The water in the Norris Geyser Basin can reach temperatures of over 93 °C (199 °F). His sister attempted to help but was unable to rescue him. Due to a lack of mobile phone service in the area, she had to travel to a nearby ranger station to seek assistance.

=== Recovery effort ===
When park officials arrived at the scene, they were able to spot Scott's remains, including his head, upper torso, and hands. However, the extreme heat of the spring, along with an incoming lightning storm, prevented immediate recovery. By the following day the high temperatures and extremely acidic water had dissolved his body, leaving only a few personal belongings, such as his wallet and flip-flops.

== Reaction and aftermath ==
The accident was widely covered in the media and reinforced warnings from park officials about the dangers of leaving designated pathways in geothermal areas. Dr. Robert Thorson, from the University of Connecticut, wrote that Scott's death highlights the consequences of disregarding safety measures but also raises questions about the origins of life on Earth, hyperthermophiles in the springs, and potential alternative postmortem practices.

== See also ==
- List of deaths in Yellowstone National Park
