= Crested Pool =

Hot spring located in the United States

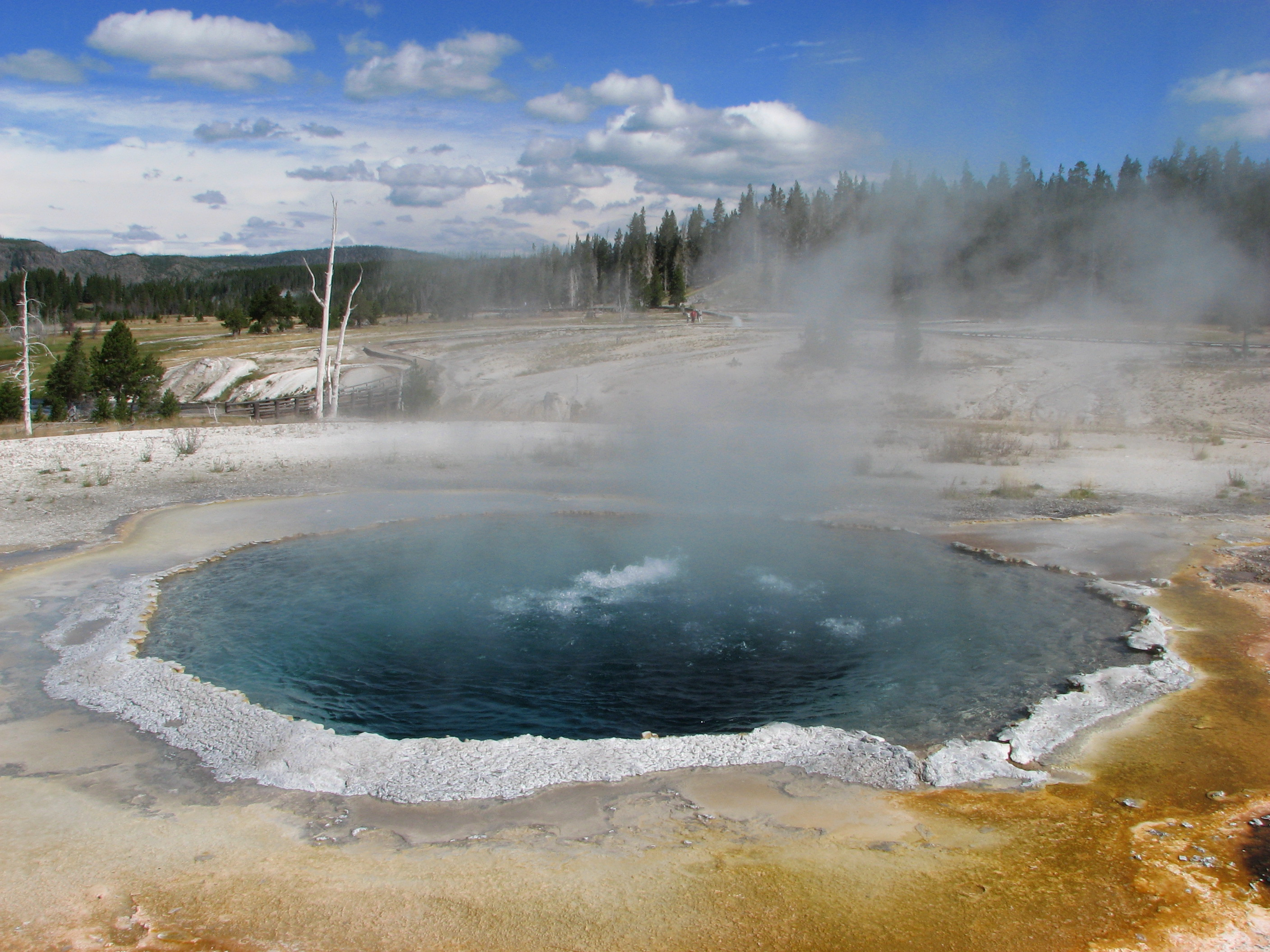
- Crested Pool

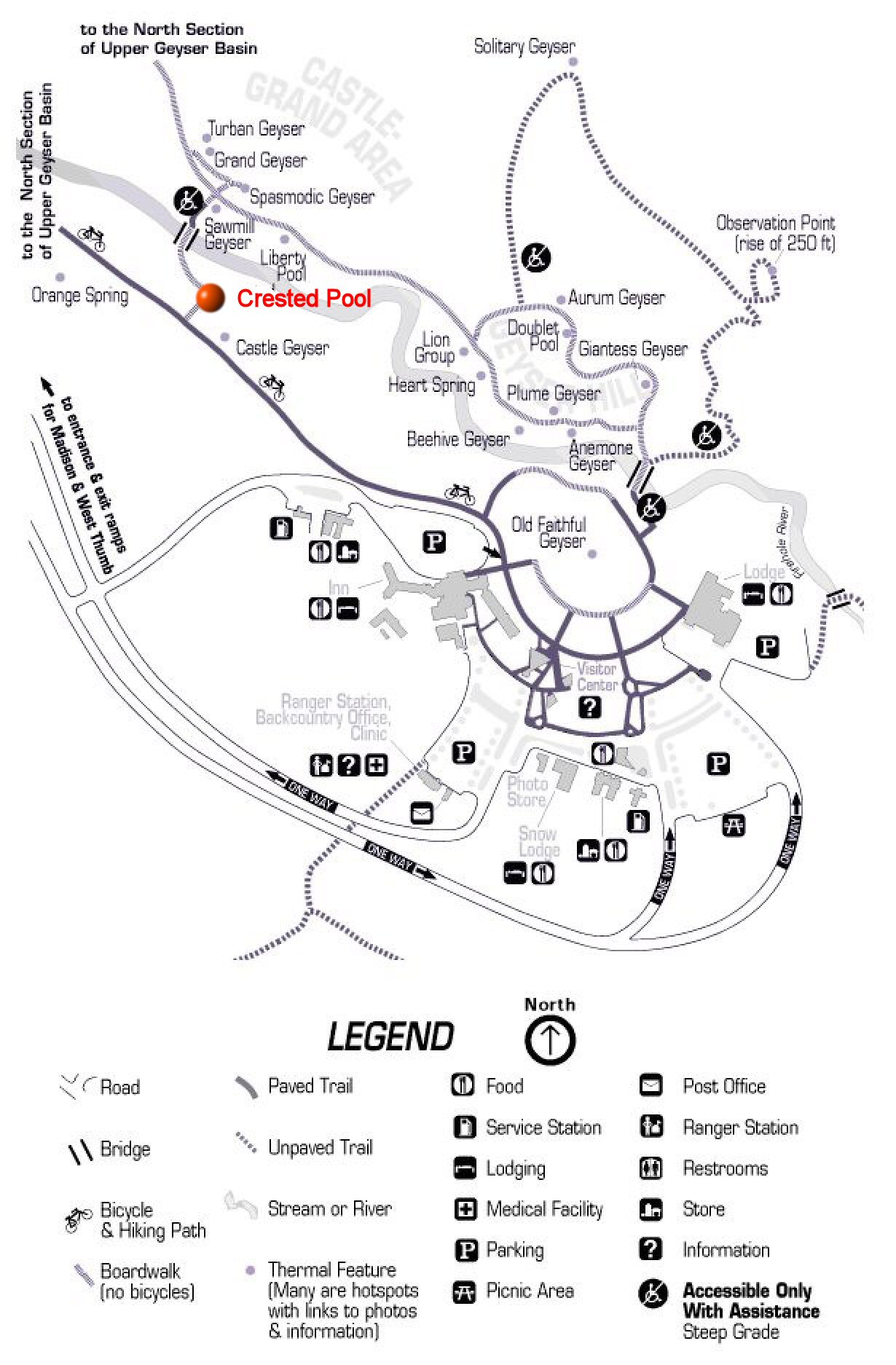
- Upper Geyser Basin
- Location: Upper Geyser Basin, Yellowstone National Park, Teton County, Wyoming
- Coordinates: 44°27′51″N 110°50′11″W
- Elevation: 7,329 feet (2,234 m)
- Temperature: 199 °F (93 °C)
- Depth: 42 feet (13 m)

Crested Pool is a hot spring in the Upper Geyser Basin in Yellowstone National Park. The spring is 42 feet (12.8 m) deep. It is named for the "crest" which surrounds the pool. Although it is considered a spring, Crested Pool sometimes erupts like a geyser.

== History ==
Crested Pool has had a variety of names since it was first described by the Hayden Geological Survey of 1871. In 1872, the Hayden survey of that year named the pool—Fire Basin. Also, in 1872, guidebook writer, Harry Norton, named the pool—Circe's Boudoir. Between 1872 and 1927, the pool was known by a variety of names—Diana's Spring, Devil's Well, Blue Crested Spring, Pool Beautiful, Castle Pool, and Diana's Bath. The name Crested Pool was accepted as official by the U.S. Board on Geographical Names committee in 1927, based on the name Crested Hot Spring on Gustavus Bechler's survey map of 1872.

In 1970, a nine-year-old boy, Andrew Clark Hecht, accidentally fell into the spring and died. The Andrew Clark Hecht Memorial Public Safety Achievement Award was created in his memory, and is annually given to the individual or group who contributes the most in public safety. The recipient also receives US$1,000.

Images of Crested Pool
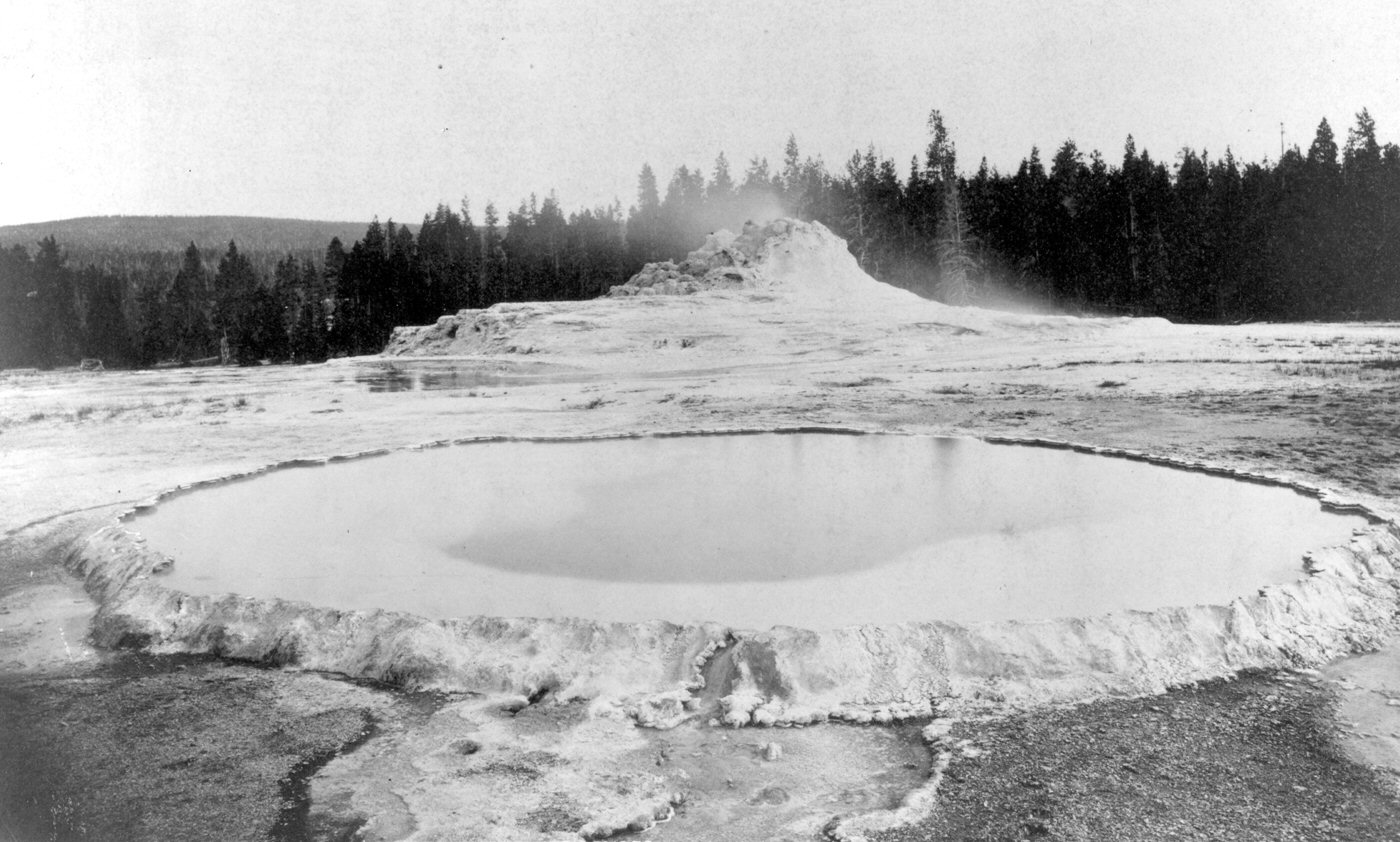
William Henry Jackson photo, 1872. Castle Geyser is in the background.

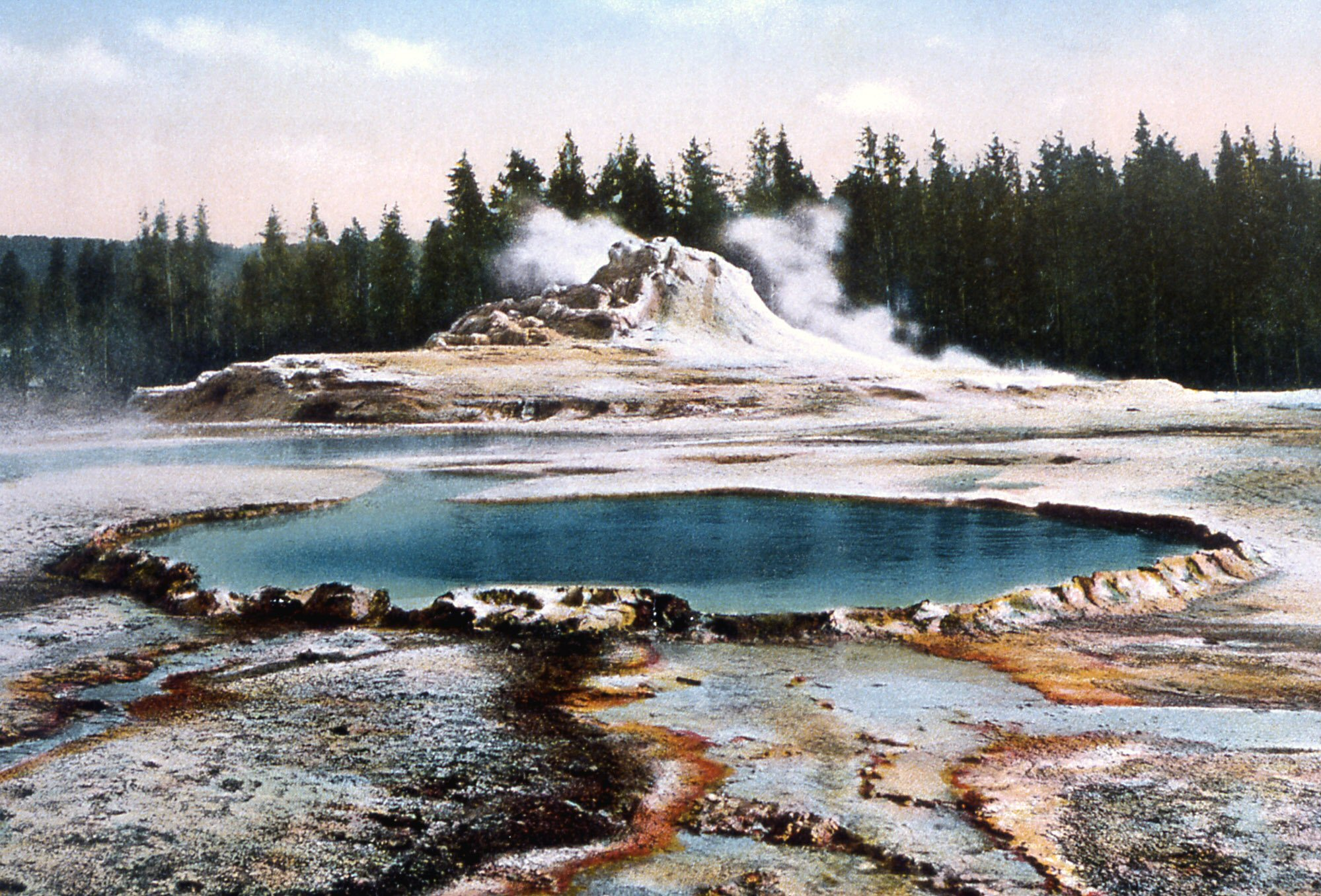
Early postcard of Crested Pool, Frank Jay Haynes

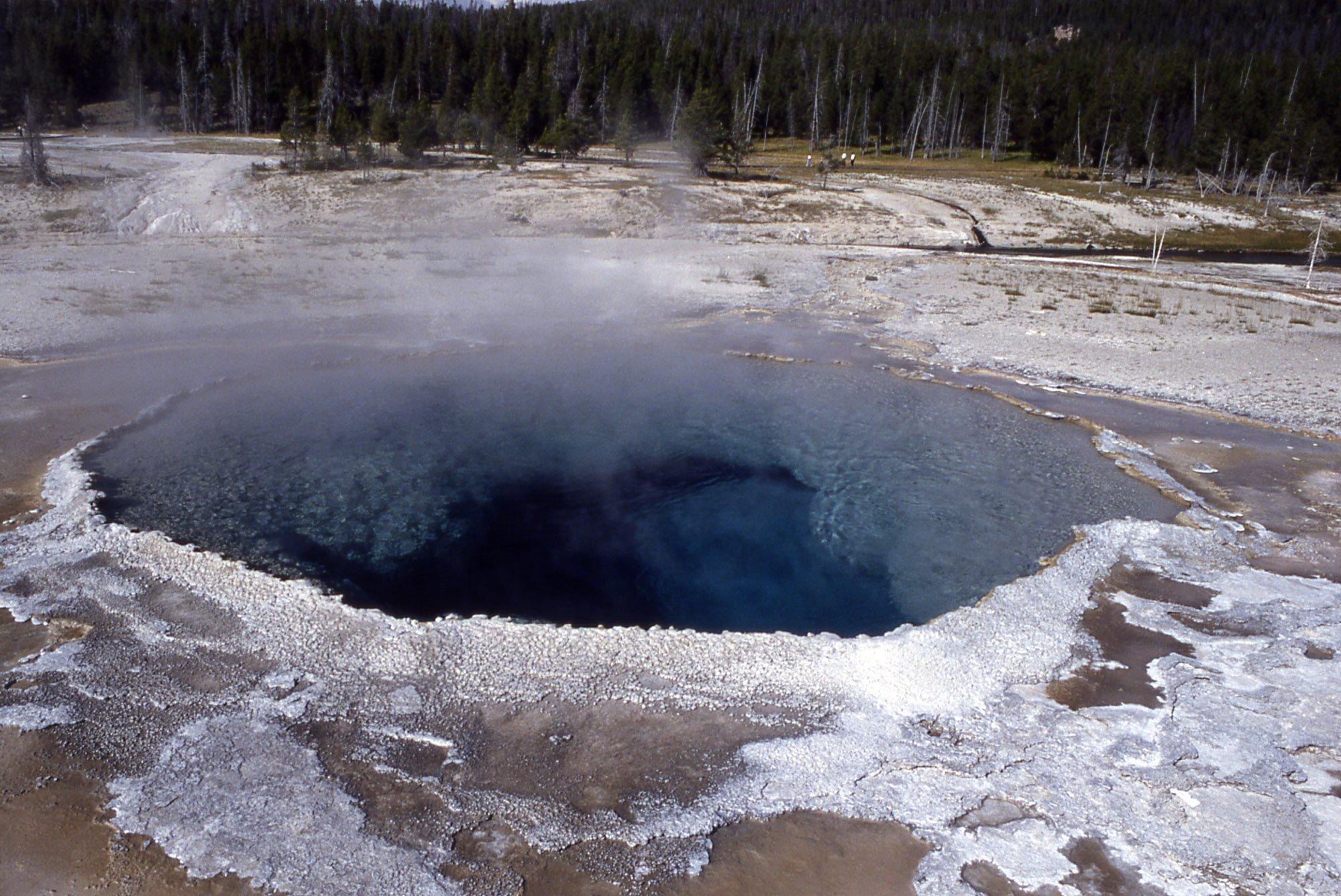
1987

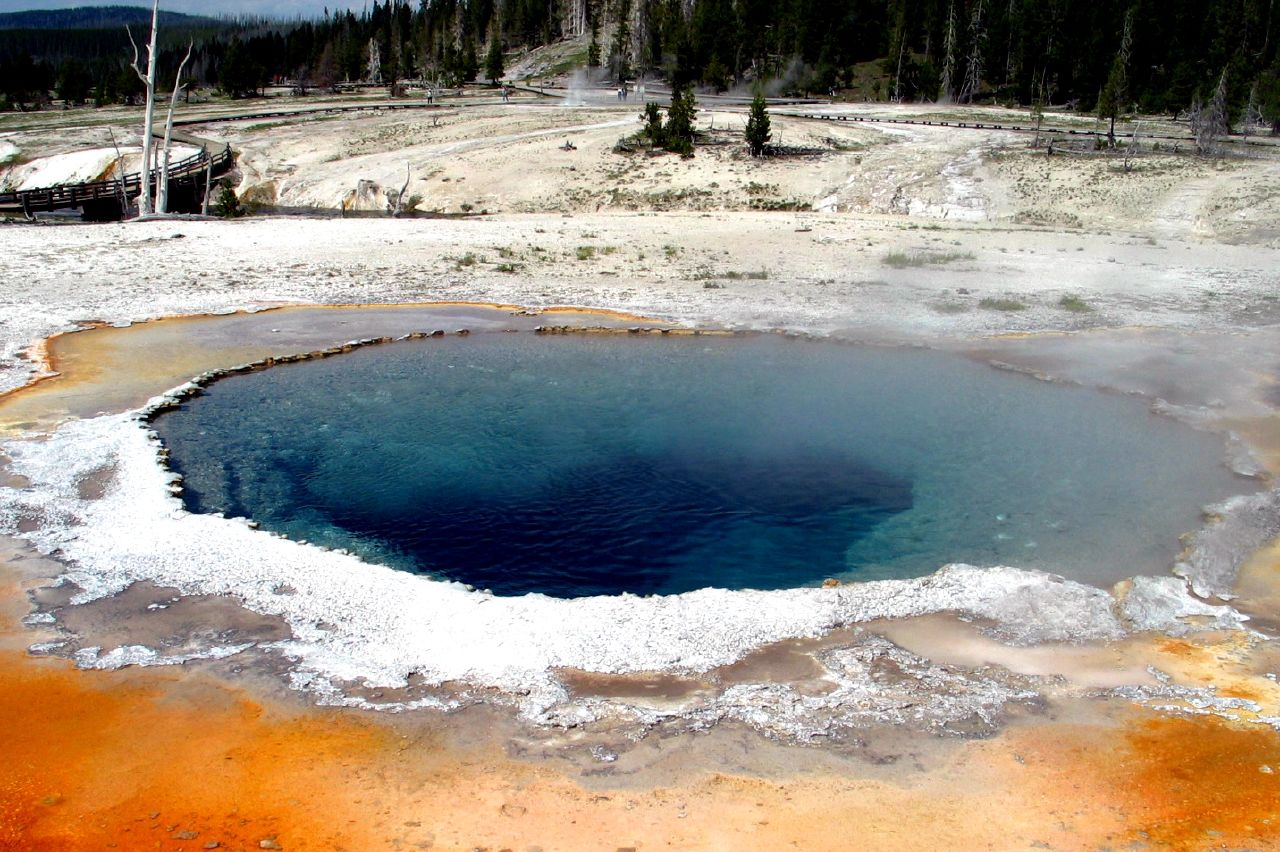
2003
